= Țepeș =

The name Țepeș may refer to:

== People ==
- Andrei Țepeș (born 1991), Romanian footballer
- Vlad III the Impaler (a.k.a. Vlad Țepeș; 1431–1476), Romanian nobleman
- Vlad Țepeș (disambiguation)

== Places ==
- Țepeș Vodă (disambiguation), several villages in Romania
- Vlad Ţepes, one of five villages comprising Comana, Giurgiu, Romania

== See also ==
- Tepe (disambiguation)
- Tepeš (surname)
