= Tir Tash =

Village in Mazandaran province, Iran

Tir Tash Persian: تيرتاش
- Village
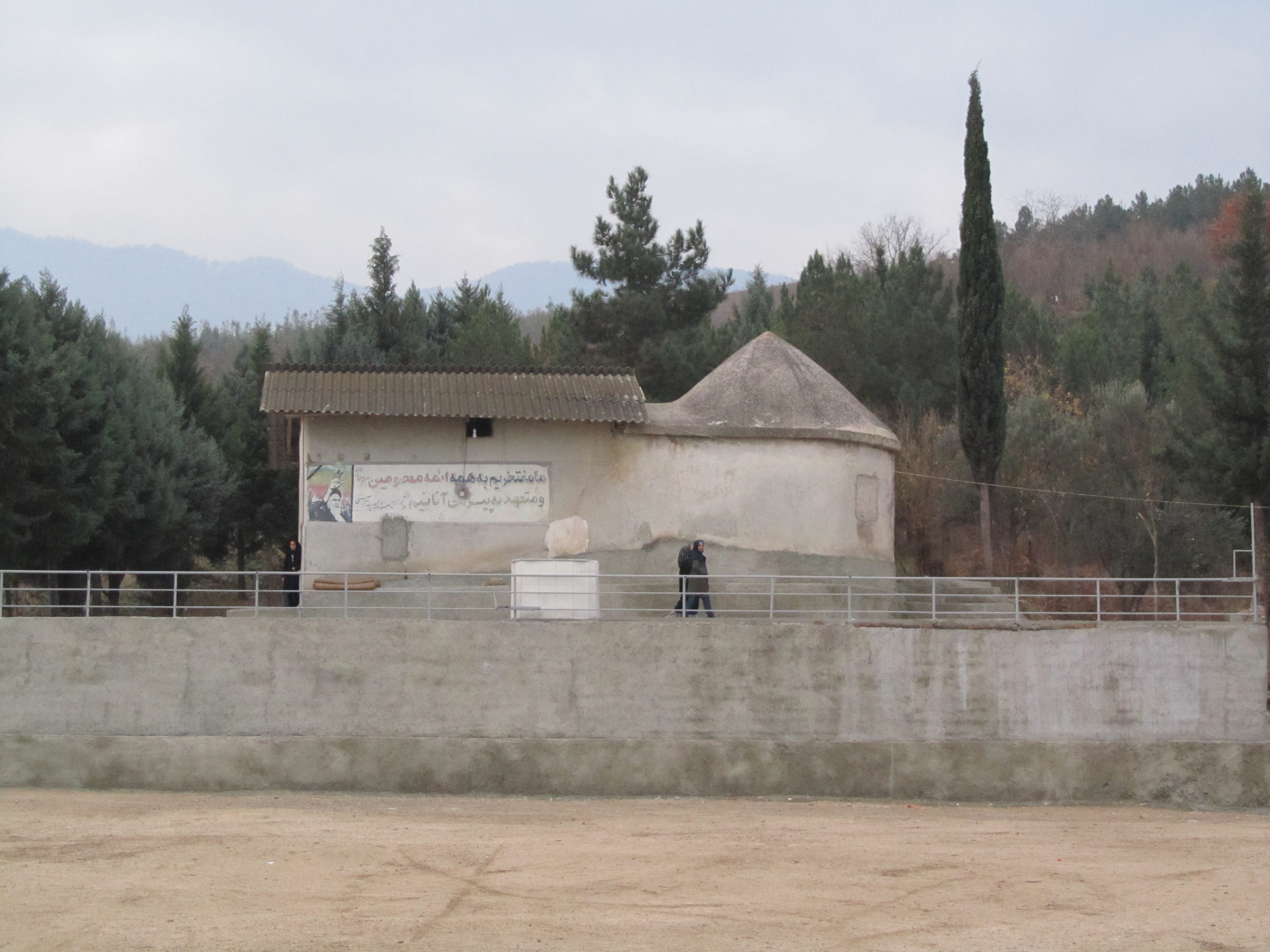
- Imamzadeh Hashem Mausoleum, Tir Tash

- Location within Iran
- Coordinates: 36°42′37″N 53°44′25″E
- Country: Iran
- Province: Mazandaran
- County: Galugah
- District: Kolbad
- Rural District: Kolbad-e Sharqi

Population (2016)
  - Total: 2,551
- Time zone: UTC+3:30 (IRST)

Tir Tash (Persian: تيرتاش) (Note: Also romanized as Tīr Tāsh and Tirtash) is a village in Kolbad-e Sharqi Rural District (Note: Formerly Kolbad Rural District) of Kolbad District in Galugah County, Mazandaran province, Iran. It's on the northern slopes of the eastern Alborz mountains, 19 km (12 mi) east of Behshahr and 9 km (5.6 mi) west of Galugah. Tir Tash has a Train station in the north of the village, which was constructed during Pahlavid era as part of Trans-Iranian Railway.

== Demographics ==
Tir Tash population history
Year	Pop.	±%
1950	1,245	—
1956	1,014	−18.6%
1966	1,417	+39.7%
1976	3,720 (Note: Also includes the population of Lemrask village)	+162.5%
1986	5,161	+38.7%
2006	2,586	−49.9%
2011	2,596	+0.4%
2016	2,551	−1.7%

People of Tir Tash are Shia Muslim, they speak Mazanderani and Persian languages. Its water source was natural springs. The village's agricultural products are rice, grain and Citrus fruit.

=== Population ===
At the 1966 census, Tir Tash had a population of 1,417 people in 225 households. The village had mosque and school, and also had power infrastructure. Cotton and Tobacco were the products besides Wheat, Rice, Walnut, Almond and Fig. At the 1976 census, Tir Tash had tap water, clinic, Veterinarian place and middle school.

At the time of the 2006 National Census, the village's population was 2,586 in 676 households. The following census in 2011 counted 2,596 people in 755 households. The 2016 census measured the population of the village as 2,551 people in 845 households. It was the most populous village in its rural district.

== Sights ==
Mausoleum of Imamzadeh Hashem is one of the historical sights in Tir Tash, which was registered as a national sight.
