= Arus Koti =

Village in Mazandaran province, Iran

Arus Koti Persian: عروس كتي
- Village
- Location within Iran
- Coordinates: 36°45′09″N 52°58′42″E
- Country: Iran
- Province: Mazandaran
- County: Juybar
- District: Larim
- Rural District: Larim-e Jonubi

Population (2016)
  - Total: 87
- Time zone: UTC+3:30 (IRST)

Arus Koti (Persian: عروس كتي) (Note: Also romanized as ‘Arūs Kotī) is a village in Larim-e Jonubi Rural District of Larim District in Juybar County, Mazandaran province, Iran.

== Demographics ==
=== Population ===
At the time of the 2006 National Census, the village's population was 81 in 21 households, when it was in Larim Rural District (Note: Renamed Larim-e Shomali Rural District) of Gil Khuran District. The following census in 2011 counted 84 people in 24 households. The 2016 census measured the population of the village as 87 people in 30 households.

In 2023, the rural district was separated from the district in the formation of Larim District and renamed Larim-e Shomali Rural District. Arus Koti was transferred to Larim-e Jonubi Rural District created in the new district.
