= Mehrabad-e Chaft Sar =

Village in Mazandaran province, Iran

Mehrabad-e Chaft Sar Persian: مهرابادچفت سر
- Village
- Location within Iran
- Coordinates: 36°41′28″N 52°57′20″E
- Country: Iran
- Province: Mazandaran
- County: Juybar
- District: Larim
- Rural District: Larim-e Jonubi

Population (2016)
  - Total: 48
- Time zone: UTC+3:30 (IRST)

Mehrabad-e Chaft Sar (Persian: مهرابادچفت سر) (Note: Also romanized as Mehrābād-e Chaft Sar; also known as Mehrābād) is a village in Larim-e Jonubi Rural District of Larim District in Juybar County, Mazandaran province, Iran.

== Demographics ==
=== Population ===
At the time of the 2006 National Census, the village's population was 60 in 20 households, when it was in Larim Rural District (Note: Renamed Larim-e Shomali Rural District) of Gil Khuran District. The following census in 2011 counted 66 people in 19 households. The 2016 census measured the population of the village as 48 people in 16 households.

In 2023, the rural district was separated from the district in the formation of Larim District and renamed Larim-e Shomali Rural District. Mehrabad-e Chaft Sar was transferred to Larim-e Jonubi Rural District created in the new district.
