= Abadeh, Mazandaran =

Village in Mazandaran province, Iran

Abadeh Persian: آباده
- Village
- Location within Iran
- Coordinates: 29°7′59″N 52°48′25″E
- Country: Iran
- Province: Mazandaran
- County: Juybar
- District: Larim
- Rural District: Larim-e Jonubi

Population (2016)
  - Total: 319
- Time zone: UTC+3:30 (IRST)

Abadeh (Persian: آباده) (Note: Also romanized as Ābādeh) is a village in Larim-e Jonubi Rural District of Larim District in Juybar County, Mazandaran province, Iran.

== Demographics ==
=== Population ===
At the time of the 2006 National Census, the village's population was 169 in 50 households, when it was in Larim Rural District (Note: Renamed Larim-e Shomali Rural District) of Gil Khuran District. The following census in 2011 counted 248 people in 73 households. The 2016 census measured the population of the village as 319 people in 102 households.

In 2023, the rural district was separated from the district in the formation of Larim District and renamed Larim-e Shomali Rural District. Abadeh was transferred to Larim-e Jonubi Rural District created in the new district.
