= Izad Kheyl =

Village in Mazandaran province, Iran

Izad Kheyl Persian: ايزدخيل
- Village
- Location within Iran
- Coordinates: 36°42′17″N 52°56′34″E
- Country: Iran
- Province: Mazandaran
- County: Juybar
- District: Larim
- Rural District: Larim-e Jonubi

Population (2016)
  - Total: 554
- Time zone: UTC+3:30 (IRST)

Izad Kheyl (Persian: ايزدخيل) (Note: Also known as Īzadi Kheyl and Īzadī Kheyl) is a village in, and the capital of, Larim-e Jonubi Rural District in Larim District of Juybar County, Mazandaran province, Iran.

== Demographics ==
=== Population ===
At the time of the 2006 National Census, the village's population was 564 in 158 households, when it was in Larim Rural District (Note: Renamed Larim-e Shomali Rural District) of Gil Khuran District. The following census in 2011 counted 557 people in 177 households. The 2016 census measured the population of the village as 554 people in 192 households.

In 2023, the rural district was separated from the district in the formation of Larim District and renamed Larim-e Shomali Rural District. Izad Kheyl was transferred to Larim-e Jonubi Rural District created in the new district.
