= Chubagh =

Village in Mazandaran province, Iran

Chubagh Persian: چوباغ
- Village
- Location within Iran
- Coordinates: 36°45′21″N 52°58′28″E
- Country: Iran
- Province: Mazandaran
- County: Juybar
- District: Larim
- Rural District: Larim-e Jonubi

Population (2016)
  - Total: 417
- Time zone: UTC+3:30 (IRST)

Chubagh (Persian: چوباغ) (Note: Also romanized as Chūbāgh) is a village in Larim-e Jonubi Rural District of Larim District in Juybar County, Mazandaran province, Iran.

== Demographics ==
=== Population ===
At the time of the 2006 National Census, the village's population was 344 in 96 households, when it was in Larim Rural District (Note: Renamed Larim-e Shomali Rural District) of Gil Khuran District. The following census in 2011 counted 381 people in 115 households. The 2016 census measured the population of the village as 417 people in 135 households.

In 2023, the rural district was separated from the district in the formation of Larim District and renamed Larim-e Shomali Rural District. Chubagh was transferred to Larim-e Jonubi Rural District created in the new district.
