= Kord Kheyl, Juybar =

Village in Mazandaran province, Iran

Kord Kheyl Persian: كردخيل
- Village
- Location within Iran
- Coordinates: 36°41′30″N 52°56′38″E
- Country: Iran
- Province: Mazandaran
- County: Juybar
- District: Larim
- Rural District: Larim-e Jonubi

Population (2016)
  - Total: 178
- Time zone: UTC+3:30 (IRST)

Kord Kheyl (Persian: كردخيل) (Note: Also known as Kord Feyl) is a village in Larim-e Jonubi Rural District of Larim District in Juybar County, Mazandaran province, Iran.

== Demographics ==
=== Population ===
At the time of the 2006 National Census, the village's population was 187 in 50 households, when it was in Larim Rural District (Note: Renamed Larim-e Shomali Rural District) of Gil Khuran District. The following census in 2011 counted 189 people in 61 households. The 2016 census measured the population of the village as 178 people in 70 households.

In 2023, the rural district was separated from the district in the formation of Larim District and renamed Larim-e Shomali Rural District. Kord Kheyl was transferred to Larim-e Jonubi Rural District created in the new district.
