= Aliabad, Juybar =

Village in Mazandaran province, Iran

Aliabad Persian: علي اباد
- Village
- Location within Iran
- Coordinates: 36°41′56″N 52°55′24″E
- Country: Iran
- Province: Mazandaran
- County: Juybar
- District: Larim
- Rural District: Larim-e Jonubi

Population (2016)
  - Total: 333
- Time zone: UTC+3:30 (IRST)

Aliabad (Persian: علي اباد) (Note: Also romanized as ‘Alīābād) is a village in Larim-e Jonubi Rural District of Larim District in Juybar County, Mazandaran province, Iran.

== Demographics ==
=== Population ===
At the time of the 2006 National Census, the village's population was 286 in 72 households, when it was in Larim Rural District (Note: Renamed Larim-e Shomali Rural District) of Gil Khuran District. The following census in 2011 counted 301 people in 85 households. The 2016 census measured the population of the village as 333 people in 108 households.

In 2023, the rural district was separated from the district in the formation of Larim District and renamed Larim-e Shomali Rural District. Aliabad was transferred to Larim-e Jonubi Rural District created in the new district.
