= Bala Zarrin Kola =

Village in Mazandaran province, Iran

Bala Zarrin Kola Persian: بالازرين كلا
- Village
- Location within Iran
- Coordinates: 36°42′36″N 52°58′21″E
- Country: Iran
- Province: Mazandaran
- County: Juybar
- District: Larim
- Rural District: Larim-e Jonubi

Population (2016)
  - Total: 707
- Time zone: UTC+3:30 (IRST)

Bala Zarrin Kola (Persian: بالازرين كلا) (Note: Also romanized as Bālā Zarrīn Kolā; also known as Zarrīn Kolā-ye Bālā) is a village in Larim-e Jonubi Rural District of Larim District in Juybar County, Mazandaran province, Iran.

== Demographics ==
=== Population ===
At the time of the 2006 National Census, the village's population was 655 in 173 households, when it was in Larim Rural District (Note: Renamed Larim-e Shomali Rural District) of Gil Khuran District. The following census in 2011 counted 678 people in 208 households. The 2016 census measured the population of the village as 707 people in 240 households.

In 2023, the rural district was separated from the district in the formation of Larim District and renamed Larim-e Shomali Rural District. Bala Zarrin Kola was transferred to Larim-e Jonubi Rural District created in the new district.
