= Rangriz Mahalleh =

Village in Mazandaran province, Iran

Rangriz Mahalleh Persian: رنگريزمحله
- Village
- Location within Iran
- Coordinates: 36°42′08″N 52°56′11″E
- Country: Iran
- Province: Mazandaran
- County: Juybar
- District: Larim
- Rural District: Larim-e Jonubi

Population (2016)
  - Total: 480
- Time zone: UTC+3:30 (IRST)

Rangriz Mahalleh (Persian: رنگريزمحله) (Note: Also romanized as Rangrīz Maḩalleh) is a village in Larim-e Jonubi Rural District of Larim District in Juybar County, Mazandaran province, Iran.

== Demographics ==
=== Population ===
At the time of the 2006 National Census, the village's population was 426 in 112 households, when it was in Larim Rural District (Note: Renamed Larim-e Shomali Rural District) of Gil Khuran District. The following census in 2011 counted 420 people in 129 households. The 2016 census measured the population of the village as 480 people in 147 households.

In 2023, the rural district was separated from the district in the formation of Larim District and renamed Larim-e Shomali Rural District. Rangriz Mahalleh was transferred to Larim-e Jonubi Rural District created in the new district.
