= Meshkabad-e Bala =

Village in Mazandaran province, Iran

Meshkabad-e Bala Persian: مشك ابادبالا
- Village
- Location within Iran
- Coordinates: 36°41′03″N 52°56′53″E
- Country: Iran
- Province: Mazandaran
- County: Juybar
- District: Larim
- Rural District: Larim-e Jonubi

Population (2016)
  - Total: 46
- Time zone: UTC+3:30 (IRST)

Meshkabad-e Bala (Persian: مشك ابادبالا) (Note: Also romanized as Meshkābād-e Bālā; also known as Bālā Meshk Maḩalleh) is a village in Larim-e Jonubi Rural District of Larim District in Juybar County, Mazandaran province, Iran.

== Demographics ==
=== Population ===
At the time of the 2006 National Census, the village's population was 84 in 26 households, when it was in Larim Rural District (Note: Renamed Larim-e Shomali Rural District) of Gil Khuran District. The following census in 2011 counted 58 people in 21 households. The 2016 census measured the population of the village as 46 people in 18 households.

In 2023, the rural district was separated from the district in the formation of Larim District and renamed Larim-e Shomali Rural District. Meshkabad-e Bala was transferred to Larim-e Jonubi Rural District created in the new district.
