= Qushchi Mahalleh =

Qushchi Mahalleh قوشچي محله
- Village
- Location within Iran
- Coordinates: 36°38′19″N 52°55′56″E
- Country: Iran
- Province: Mazandaran
- County: Juybar
- Bakhsh: Central
- Rural District: Siyahrud

Population (2006)
  - Total: 106
- Time zone: UTC+3:30 (IRST)
  - Summer (DST): UTC+4:30 (IRDT)

Qushchi Mahalleh (Persian: قوشچي محله, also Romanized as Qūshchī Maḩalleh; also known as Qūchī Maḩalleh) is a village in Siyahrud Rural District, in the Central District of Juybar County, Mazandaran Province, Iran. At the 2006 census, its population was 106, in 30 families.
