= Saraj Mahalleh =

Saraj Mahalleh or Seraj Mahalleh (Persian: سراج محله) may refer to:

- Saraj Mahalleh, Amol
- Saraj Mahalleh, Galugah
- Seraj Mahalleh, Juybar
