= Pain Zarrin Kola =

Village in Mazandaran province, Iran

Pain Zarrin Kola Persian: پايين زرين كلا
- Village
- Location within Iran
- Coordinates: 36°43′36″N 52°57′41″E
- Country: Iran
- Province: Mazandaran
- County: Juybar
- District: Larim
- Rural District: Larim-e Shomali

Population (2016)
  - Total: 1,174
- Time zone: UTC+3:30 (IRST)

Pain Zarrin Kola (Persian: پايين زرين كلا) (Note: Also romanized as Pā’īn Zarrīn Kolā; also known as Zarrīn Kolā and Zarrīn Kolā-ye Pā’īn) is a village in, and the capital of, Larim-e Shomali Rural District (Note: Formerly Larim Rural District) in Larim District of Juybar County, Mazandaran province, Iran. The previous capital of the rural district was the village of Larim.

== Demographics ==
=== Population ===
At the time of the 2006 National Census, the village's population was 1,093 in 304 households, when it was in Larim Rural District (Note: Renamed Larim-e Shomali Rural District) of Gil Khuran District. The following census in 2011 counted 1,176 people in 372 households. The 2016 census measured the population of the village as 1,174 people in 386 households.

In 2023, the rural district was separated from the district in the formation of Larim District and renamed Larim-e Shomali Rural District.
