= Chahar Taq Bon =

Chahar Taq Bon چهارطاقبن
- Village
- Location within Iran
- Coordinates: 36°37′37″N 52°58′05″E
- Country: Iran
- Province: Mazandaran
- County: Juybar
- Bakhsh: Central
- Rural District: Siyahrud

Population (2006)
  - Total: 452
- Time zone: UTC+3:30 (IRST)
  - Summer (DST): UTC+4:30 (IRDT)

Chahar Taq Bon (Persian: چهارطاقبن, also Romanized as Chahār Ţāq Bon) is a village in Siyahrud Rural District, in the Central District of Juybar County, Mazandaran Province, Iran. At the 2006 census, its population was 452, in 116 families.
