= Anbarsar, Mazandaran =

Village in Mazandaran province, Iran

Anbarsar Persian: انبارسر
- Village
- Location within Iran
- Coordinates: 36°43′50″N 52°51′04″E
- Country: Iran
- Province: Mazandaran
- County: Juybar
- District: Gil Khuran
- Rural District: Chapakrud-e Gharbi

Population (2016)
  - Total: 223
- Time zone: UTC+3:30 (IRST)

Anbarsar (Persian: انبارسر) (Note: Also romanized as Anbārsar; also known as Anbār Sarā) is a village in Chapakrud-e Gharbi Rural District of Gil Khuran District in Juybar County, Mazandaran province, Iran.

== Demographics ==
=== Population ===
At the time of the 2006 National Census, the village's population was 202 in 52 households, when it was in Chapakrud Rural District. (Note: Renamed Chapakrud-e Sharqi Rural District) The following census in 2011 counted 221 people in 66 households. The 2016 census measured the population of the village as 223 people in 75 households.

In 2023, Anbarsar was transferred to Chapakrud-e Gharbi Rural District created in the same district.
