= Darvish Mohammad Shah =

Darvish Mohammad Shah درويش محمدشاه
- Village
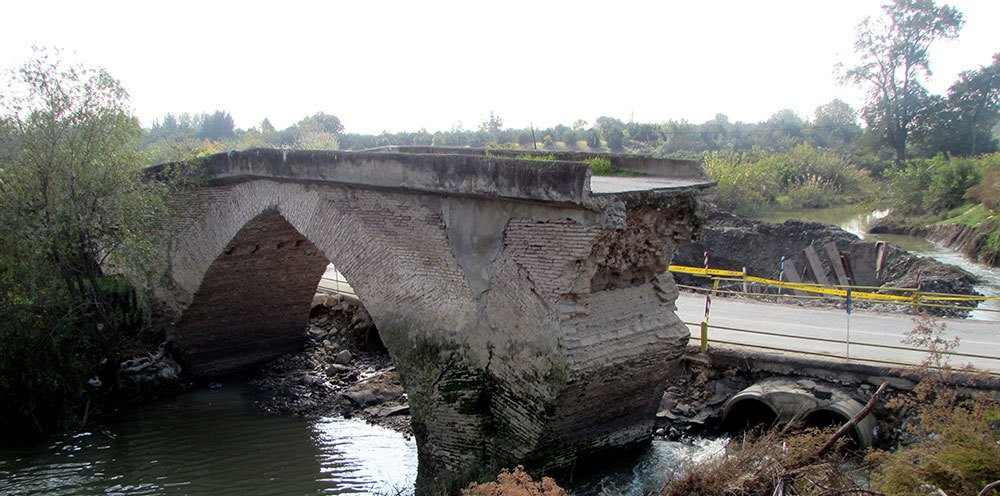

- Location within Iran
- Coordinates: 36°38′40″N 52°56′13″E
- Country: Iran
- Province: Mazandaran
- County: Juybar
- Bakhsh: Central
- Rural District: Siyahrud

Population (2016)
  - Total: 261
- Time zone: UTC+3:30 (IRST)

Darvish Mohammad Shah (Persian: درويش محمدشاه, also Romanized as Darvīsh Moḩammad Shāh) is a village in Siyahrud Rural District, in the Central District of Juybar County, Mazandaran Province, Iran.

At the time of the 2006 National Census, the village's population was 275 in 74 households. The following census in 2011 counted 262 people in 84 households. The 2016 census measured the population of the village as 261 people in 88 households.
