= Goldasht, Mazandaran =

Village in Mazandaran province, Iran

Goldasht Persian: گلدشت
- Village
- Location within Iran
- Coordinates: 36°44′23″N 52°51′33″E
- Country: Iran
- Province: Mazandaran
- County: Juybar
- District: Gil Khuran
- Rural District: Chapakrud-e Gharbi

Population (2016)
  - Total: 380
- Time zone: UTC+3:30 (IRST)

Goldasht (Persian: گلدشت) is a village in Chapakrud-e Gharbi Rural District of Gil Khuran District in Juybar County, Mazandaran province, Iran.

== Demographics ==
=== Population ===
At the time of the 2006 National Census, the village's population was 375 in 88 households, when it was in Chapakrud Rural District. (Note: Renamed Chapakrud-e Sharqi Rural District) The following census in 2011 counted 388 people in 110 households. The 2016 census measured the population of the village as 380 people in 134 households.

In 2023, Goldasht was transferred to Chapakrud-e Gharbi Rural District created in the same district.
