= Meshkabad =

Meshkabad (Persian: مشك اباد) may refer to:

- Meshkabad-e Qadim, East Azerbaijan Province
- Meshkabad-e Bala, Mazandaran Province
- Meshkabad-e Pain, Mazandaran Province
