= Seyyed Zeyn ol Abedin =

Seyyed Zeyn ol Abedin سيدزين العابدين
- Village
- Location within Iran
- Coordinates: 36°40′01″N 52°53′38″E
- Country: Iran
- Province: Mazandaran
- County: Juybar
- Bakhsh: Central
- Rural District: Siyahrud

Population (2006)
  - Total: 312
- Time zone: UTC+3:30 (IRST)
  - Summer (DST): UTC+4:30 (IRDT)

Seyyed Zeyn ol Abedin (Persian: سيدزين العابدين, also Romanized as Seyyed Zeyn ol ‘Ābedīn) is a village in Siyahrud Rural District, in the Central District of Juybar County, Mazandaran Province, Iran. At the 2006 census, its population was 312, in 77 families.
