= Lapu Sahra =

Village in Mazandaran province, Iran

Lapu Sahra Persian: لپوصحرا
- Village
- Location within Iran
- Coordinates: 36°43′01″N 52°50′07″E
- Country: Iran
- Province: Mazandaran
- County: Juybar
- District: Gil Khuran
- Rural District: Chapakrud-e Gharbi

Population (2016)
  - Total: 204
- Time zone: UTC+3:30 (IRST)

Lapu Sahra (Persian: لپوصحرا) (Note: Also romanized as Lapū Şaḩrā; also known as Labū Şaḩrā) is a village in Chapakrud-e Gharbi Rural District of Gil Khuran District in Juybar County, Mazandaran province, Iran.

== Demographics ==
=== Population ===
At the time of the 2006 National Census, the village's population was 170 in 40 households, when it was in Chapakrud Rural District. (Note: Renamed Chapakrud-e Sharqi Rural District) The following census in 2011 counted 223 people in 57 households. The 2016 census measured the population of the village as 204 people in 59 households.

In 2023, Lapu Sahra was transferred to Chapakrud-e Gharbi Rural District created in the same district.
