= Safar Kheyl =

Safar Kheyl صفرخيل
- Village
- Location within Iran
- Coordinates: 36°35′58″N 52°56′11″E
- Country: Iran
- Province: Mazandaran
- County: Juybar
- Bakhsh: Central
- Rural District: Siyahrud

Population (2006)
  - Total: 253
- Time zone: UTC+3:30 (IRST)
  - Summer (DST): UTC+4:30 (IRDT)

Safar Kheyl (Persian: صفرخيل, also Romanized as Şafar Kheyl; also known as Aşafar Kheyl) is a village in Siyahrud Rural District, in the Central District of Juybar County, Mazandaran Province, Iran. At the 2006 census, its population was 253, in 67 families.
