= Ashireh Sar =

Ashireh Sar عشيره سر
- Village
- Country: Iran
- Province: Mazandaran
- County: Juybar
- Bakhsh: Central
- Rural District: Siyahrud

Population (2006)
  - Total: 95
- Time zone: UTC+3:30 (IRST)
  - Summer (DST): UTC+4:30 (IRDT)

Ashireh Sar (Persian: عشيره سر, also Romanized as ʿAshīreh Sar) is a village in Siyahrud Rural District, in the Central District of Juybar County, Mazandaran Province, Iran. At the 2006 census, its population was 95, in 26 families.
