= Meshkabad-e Pain =

Village in Mazandaran province, Iran

Meshkabad-e Pain Persian: مشك ابادپائين
- Village
- Country: Iran
- Province: Mazandaran
- County: Juybar
- District: Larim
- Rural District: Larim-e Jonubi

Population (2016)
  - Total: 452
- Time zone: UTC+3:30 (IRST)

Meshkabad-e Pain (Persian: مشك ابادپائين) (Note: Also romanized as Meshkābād-e Pā’īn) is a village in Larim-e Jonubi Rural District of Larim District in Juybar County, Mazandaran province, Iran.

== Demographics ==
=== Population ===
At the time of the 2006 National Census, the village's population was 472 in 131 households, when it was in Larim Rural District (Note: Renamed Larim-e Shomali Rural District) of Gil Khuran District. The following census in 2011 counted 484 people in 148 households. The 2016 census measured the population of the village as 452 people in 148 households.

In 2023, the rural district was separated from the district in the formation of Larim District and renamed Larim-e Shomali Rural District. Meshkabad-e Pain was transferred to Larim-e Jonubi Rural District created in the new district.
