= Khor Deh Larim =

Village in Mazandaran province, Iran

Khor Deh Larim Persian: خرده لاريم
- Village
- Location within Iran
- Coordinates: 36°42′48″N 52°55′59″E
- Country: Iran
- Province: Mazandaran
- County: Juybar
- District: Larim
- Rural District: Larim-e Shomali

Population (2016)
  - Total: 223
- Time zone: UTC+3:30 (IRST)

Khor Deh Larim (Persian: خرده لاريم) (Note: Also romanized as Khor Deh Lārīm and Khvor Deh Lārīm) is a village in Larim-e Shomali Rural District (Note: Formerly Larim Rural District) of Larim District in Juybar County, Mazandaran province, Iran.

== Demographics ==
=== Population ===
At the time of the 2006 National Census, the village's population was 130 in 35 households, when it was in Larim Rural District (Note: Renamed Larim-e Shomali Rural District) of Gil Khuran District. The following census in 2011 counted 263 people in 80 households. The 2016 census measured the population of the village as 223 people in 75 households.

In 2023, the rural district was separated from the district in the formation of Larim District and renamed Larim-e Shomali Rural District.
