= Pain Zoghal Manzel =

Village in Mazandaran province, Iran

Pain Zoghal Manzel Persian: پائين ذغال منزل
- Village
- Location within Iran
- Coordinates: 36°40′23″N 52°51′49″E
- Country: Iran
- Province: Mazandaran
- County: Juybar
- District: Gil Khuran
- Rural District: Chapakrud-e Gharbi

Population (2016)
  - Total: 340
- Time zone: UTC+3:30 (IRST)

Pain Zoghal Manzel (Persian: پائين ذغال منزل) (Note: Also romanized as Pā’īn Zoghāl Manzel; also known as Zoghāl Manzel) is a village in Chapakrud-e Gharbi Rural District of Gil Khuran District in Juybar County, Mazandaran province, Iran.

== Demographics ==
=== Population ===
At the time of the 2006 National Census, the village's population was 373 in 90 households, when it was in Chapakrud Rural District. (Note: Renamed Chapakrud-e Sharqi Rural District) The following census in 2011 counted 342 people in 101 households. The 2016 census measured the population of the village as 340 people in 108 households.

In 2023, Pain Zoghal Manzel was transferred to Chapakrud-e Gharbi Rural District created in the same district.
