= Dunchal =

Village in Mazandaran province, Iran

Dunchal Persian: دونچال
- Village
- Location within Iran
- Coordinates: 36°41′03″N 52°51′46″E
- Country: Iran
- Province: Mazandaran
- County: Juybar
- District: Gil Khuran
- Rural District: Chapakrud-e Gharbi

Population (2016)
  - Total: 1,393
- Time zone: UTC+3:30 (IRST)

Dunchal (Persian: دونچال) (Note: Also romanized as Dūnchāl) is a village in Chapakrud-e Gharbi Rural District of Gil Khuran District in Juybar County, Mazandaran province, Iran.

== Demographics ==
=== Population ===
At the time of the 2006 National Census, the village's population was 1,304 in 348 households, when it was in Chapakrud Rural District. (Note: Renamed Chapakrud-e Sharqi Rural District) The following census in 2011 counted 1,316 people in 401 households. The 2016 census measured the population of the village as 1,393 people in 479 households.

In 2023, Dunchal was transferred to Chapakrud-e Gharbi Rural District created in the same district.
