= Mistan, Mazandaran =

Village in Mazandaran province, Iran

Mistan Persian: ميستان
- Village
- Location within Iran
- Coordinates: 36°40′33″N 52°49′51″E
- Country: Iran
- Province: Mazandaran
- County: Juybar
- District: Gil Khuran
- Rural District: Chapakrud-e Gharbi

Population (2016)
  - Total: 798
- Time zone: UTC+3:30 (IRST)

Mistan (Persian: ميستان) (Note: Also romanized as Mīstān) is a village in Chapakrud-e Gharbi Rural District of Gil Khuran District in Juybar County, Mazandaran province, Iran.

== Demographics ==
=== Population ===
At the time of the 2006 National Census, the village's population was 715 in 188 households, when it was in Chapakrud Rural District. (Note: Renamed Chapakrud-e Sharqi Rural District) The following census in 2011 counted 700 people in 210 households. The 2016 census measured the population of the village as 798 people in 264 households.

In 2023, Mistan was transferred to Chapakrud-e Gharbi Rural District created in the same district.
