= Tork Mahalleh =

Tork Mahalleh or Tark Mahalleh or Turk Mahalleh (Persian: ترك محله) may refer to:

- Tork Mahalleh, Talesh, Gilan Province
- Tork Mahalleh, Kargan Rud, Talesh County, Gilan Province
- Tork Mahalleh-ye Alalan, Gilan Province
- Tork Mahalleh, Babol, Mazandaran Province
- Tork Mahalleh, Juybar, Mazandaran Province
