= Hoseyn Beygi (disambiguation) =

Hoseyn Beygi is a village in Khuzestan Province, Iran.

Hoseyn Beygi (Persian: حُسِين بِيگی) may also refer to:

- Hoseynabad-e Khayyat
- Shah Reza, Lorestan
