= Naft Chal, Juybar =

Village in Mazandaran province, Iran

Naft Chal Persian: نفت چال
- Village
- Location within Iran
- Country: Iran
- Province: Mazandaran
- County: Juybar
- District: Gil Khuran
- Rural District: Chapakrud-e Gharbi

Population (2016)
  - Total: 149
- Time zone: UTC+3:30 (IRST)

Naft Chal (Persian: نفت چال) (Note: Also romanized as Naft Chāl) is a village in Chapakrud-e Gharbi Rural District of Gil Khuran District in Juybar County, Mazandaran province, Iran.

== Demographics ==
=== Population ===
At the time of the 2006 National Census, the village's population was 150 in 38 households, when it was in Chapakrud Rural District. (Note: Renamed Chapakrud-e Sharqi Rural District) The following census in 2011 counted 108 people in 30 households. The 2016 census measured the population of the village as 149 people in 45 households.

In 2023, Naft Chal was transferred to Chapakrud-e Gharbi Rural District created in the same district.
