= Anar Marz =

Village in Mazandaran province, Iran

Anar Marz Persian: انارمرز
- Village
- Location within Iran
- Coordinates: 36°42′22″N 52°51′00″E
- Country: Iran
- Province: Mazandaran
- County: Juybar
- District: Gil Khuran
- Rural District: Chapakrud-e Gharbi

Population (2016)
  - Total: 1,428
- Time zone: UTC+3:30 (IRST)

Anar Marz (Persian: انارمرز) (Note: Also romanized as Anār Marz; also known as Marz) is a village in, and the capital of, Chapakrud-e Gharbi Rural District in Gil Khuran District of Juybar County, Mazandaran province, Iran.

== Demographics ==
=== Population ===
At the time of the 2006 National Census, the village's population was 1,381 in 324 households, when it was in Chapakrud Rural District. (Note: Renamed Chapakrud-e Sharqi Rural District) The following census in 2011 counted 1,439 people in 401 households. The 2016 census measured the population of the village as 1,428 people in 441 households.

In 2023, Anar Marz was transferred to Chapakrud-e Gharbi Rural District created in the same district.
