= Kolbad =

Kolbad (Persian: کلباد) may refer to:

- Kolbad District
- Kolbad-e Gharbi Rural District
- Kolbad-e Sharqi Rural District
