= Tepes =

Tepes may refer to:

== People ==
- Sofija Tepes (born 1973), Chilean table tennis player
- Tepeš (surname), Slovene surname
- Țepeș (surname), Romanian surname

== In fiction ==
- Krul Tepes, character in the Owari no Seraph anime & manga
- Mina Tepes, main character in the Dance in the Vampire Bund manga
- PNS Tepes, starship in the Honorverse series of books by David Weber

== Places ==
- Țepeș Vodă (disambiguation), several villages in Romania
- Vlad Ţepes, one of five villages comprising Comana, Giurgiu, Romania

== Other ==
- Tepes, a dialect of the Soo language
