= Shib Ab Bandan =

Village in Mazandaran province, Iran

Shib Ab Bandan Persian: شيب آبندان
- Village
- Location within Iran
- Coordinates: 36°35′38″N 52°55′10″E
- Country: Iran
- Province: Mazandaran
- County: Juybar
- District: Central
- Rural District: Hasan Reza

Population (2016)
  - Total: 643
- Time zone: UTC+3:30 (IRST)

Shib Ab Bandan (Persian: شيب اببندان) (Note: Also romanized as Shīb Āb Bandān) is a village in, and the capital of, Hasan Reza Rural District in the Central District of Juybar County, Mazandaran province, Iran.

== Demographics ==
=== Population ===
At the time of the 2006 National Census, the village's population was 696 in 164 households. The following census in 2011 counted 668 people in 196 households. The 2016 census measured the population of the village as 643 people in 210 households.
