= Talesh Mahalleh, Juybar =

Village in Mazandaran province, Iran

Talesh Mahalleh Persian: طالش محله
- Village
- Location within Iran
- Coordinates: 36°39′30″N 52°57′28″E
- Country: Iran
- Province: Mazandaran
- County: Juybar
- District: Central
- Rural District: Siyahrud

Population (2016)
  - Total: 1,313
- Time zone: UTC+3:30 (IRST)

Talesh Mahalleh (Persian: طالش محله) (Note: Also romanized as Ţālesh Maḩalleh) is a village in Siyahrud Rural District of the Central District in Juybar County, Mazandaran province, Iran.

== Demographics ==
=== Population ===
At the time of the 2006 National Census, the village's population was 1,086 in 288 households. The following census in 2011 counted 1,307 people in 384 households. The 2016 census measured the population of the village as 1,313 people in 410 households.
