= Azan, Mazandaran =

Azan ازان
- Village
- Location within Iran
- Coordinates: 36°34′12″N 52°55′01″E
- Country: Iran
- Province: Mazandaran
- County: Juybar
- Bakhsh: Central
- Rural District: Hasan Reza

Population (2016)
  - Total: 101
- Time zone: UTC+3:30 (IRST)

Azan (Persian: ازان, also Romanized as Āzān) is a village in Hasan Reza Rural District, in the Central District of Juybar County, Mazandaran Province, Iran.

At the time of the 2006 National Census, the village's population was 70 in 20 households. The following census in 2011 counted 92 people in 25 households. The 2016 census measured the population of the village as 101 people in 35 households.
