= Esmail Kola =

Esmail Kola (Persian: اسماعيل كلا) may refer to:

- Esmail Kola-ye Bozorg
- Esmail Kola-ye Kuchek
