= Astaneh Sar =

Village in Mazandaran province, Iran

Astaneh Sar Persian: استانه سر
- Village
- Location within Iran
- Coordinates: 36°39′37″N 52°53′53″E
- Country: Iran
- Province: Mazandaran
- County: Juybar
- District: Central
- Rural District: Siyahrud

Population (2016)
  - Total: 1,418
- Time zone: UTC+3:30 (IRST)

Astaneh Sar (Persian: استانه سر) (Note: Also romanized as Āstāneh Sar) is a village in Siyahrud Rural District of the Central District in Juybar County, Mazandaran province, Iran.

== Demographics ==
=== Population ===
At the time of the 2006 National Census, the village's population was 1,278 in 299 households. The following census in 2011 counted 1,353 people in 382 households. The 2016 census measured the population of the village as 1,418 people in 442 households.
