= Lak Dasht, Juybar =

Village in Mazandaran province, Iran

Lak Dasht Persian: لاك دشت
- Village
- Location within Iran
- Coordinates: 36°41′52″N 52°52′02″E
- Country: Iran
- Province: Mazandaran
- County: Juybar
- District: Gil Khuran
- Rural District: Chapakrud-e Gharbi

Population (2016)
  - Total: 215
- Time zone: UTC+3:30 (IRST)

Lak Dasht (Persian: لاك دشت) (Note: Also romanized as Lāk Dasht; also known as Lāk Dasht-e Bozorg) is a village in Chapakrud-e Gharbi Rural District of Gil Khuran District in Juybar County, Mazandaran province, Iran.

== Demographics ==
=== Population ===
At the time of the 2006 National Census, the village's population was 232 in 51 households, when it was in Chapakrud Rural District. (Note: Renamed Chapakrud-e Sharqi Rural District) The following census in 2011 counted 224 people in 64 households. The 2016 census measured the population of the village as 215 people in 70 households.

In 2023, Lak Dasht was transferred to Chapakrud-e Gharbi Rural District created in the same district.
