= Larim-e Jonubi Rural District =

Rural district in Mazandaran province, Iran

Larim-e Jonubi Rural District Persian: دهستان لاریم جنوبی
- Rural District
- Location within Iran
- Coordinates: 36°43′N 52°58′E
- Country: Iran
- Province: Mazandaran
- County: Juybar
- District: Larim
- Established: 2023
- Capital: Izad Kheyl
- Time zone: UTC+3:30 (IRST)

Larim-e Jonubi Rural District (Persian: دهستان لاریم جنوبی) is in Larim District of Juybar County, Mazandaran province, Iran. Its capital is the village of Izad Kheyl, whose population at the time of the 2016 National Census was 554 in 192 households.

== History ==
In 2023, Larim Rural District (Note: Renamed Larim-e Shomali Rural District) was separated from Gil Khuran District in the formation of Larim District, and Larim-e Jonubi Rural District was created in the new district.

== Other villages in the rural district ==
- Abadeh
- Aliabad
- Arus Koti
- Bala Zarrin Kola
- Chubagh
- Kord Kheyl
- Mehrabad-e Chaft Sar
- Meshkabad-e Bala
- Meshkabad-e Pain
- Rangriz Mahalleh
