= Gelyard, Juybar =

Village in Mazandaran province, Iran

Gelyard Persian: گليرد
- Village
- Location within Iran
- Coordinates: 36°36′42″N 52°56′38″E
- Country: Iran
- Province: Mazandaran
- County: Juybar
- District: Central
- Rural District: Siyahrud

Population (2016)
  - Total: 1,604
- Time zone: UTC+3:30 (IRST)

Gelyard (Persian: گليرد) (Note: Also romanized as Gelīyerd; also known as Gelerd) is a village in, and the capital of, Siyahrud Rural District in the Central District of Juybar County, Mazandaran province, Iran.

== Demographics ==
=== Population ===
At the time of the 2006 National Census, the village's population was 1,453 in 419 households. The following census in 2011 counted 1,569 people in 497 households. The 2016 census measured the population of the village as 1,604 people in 539 households.
