= Viva, Iran =

Viva ويوا
- Village
- Location within Iran
- Coordinates: 36°38′08″N 53°57′11″E
- Country: Iran
- Province: Mazandaran
- County: Galugah
- Bakhsh: Central
- Rural District: Tuskacheshmeh

Population (2006)
  - Total: 81
- Time zone: UTC+3:30 (IRST)

Viva (Persian: ويوا, also Romanized as Vīvā and Veyvā; also known as Vevā) is a village in Tuskacheshmeh Rural District, in the Central District of Galugah County, Mazandaran Province, Iran. At the 2016 census, its population was 32, in 13 families. Decreased from 81 people in 2006.
