= Shah Reza Mahalleh =

Shah Reza Mahalleh شاهرضامحله
- Village
- Location within Iran
- Coordinates: 36°40′53″N 52°58′53″E
- Country: Iran
- Province: Mazandaran
- County: Juybar
- Bakhsh: Central
- Rural District: Siyahrud

Population (2006)
  - Total: 142
- Time zone: UTC+3:30 (IRST)
  - Summer (DST): UTC+4:30 (IRDT)

Shah Reza Mahalleh (Persian: شاهرضامحله, also Romanized as Shāh Reẕā Maḩalleh; also known as Shāh Rez̧ā and Shāh Reẕā) is a village in Siyahrud Rural District, in the Central District of Juybar County, Mazandaran Province, Iran. At the 2006 census, its population was 142, in 42 families.
