= Aghuz Darreh =

Village in Mazandaran province, Iran

Aghuz Darreh Persian: آغوزدره
- Village
- Location within Iran
- Coordinates: 36°37′45″N 53°54′50″E
- Country: Iran
- Province: Mazandaran
- County: Galugah
- District: Central
- Rural District: Tuskacheshmeh

Population (2016)
  - Total: 263
- Time zone: UTC+3:30 (IRST)

Aghuz Darreh (Persian: آغوزدره) (Note: Also romanized as Āghūz Darreh and Āghūzdarreh; also known as Āghūz Dar and Āghūzdar) is a village in Tuskacheshmeh Rural District of the Central District in Galugah County, Mazandaran province, Iran.

== Demographics ==
=== Population ===
At the time of the 2006 National Census, the village's population was 397 in 96 households. The following census in 2011 counted 309 people in 95 households. The 2016 census measured the population of the village as 263 people in 102 households.
