= Emamzadeh Mahmud, Mazandaran =

Village in Mazandaran province, Iran

Emamzadeh Mahmud Persian: امامزاده محمود
- Village
- Location within Iran
- Coordinates: 36°45′05″N 52°55′59″E
- Country: Iran
- Province: Mazandaran
- County: Juybar
- District: Larim
- Rural District: Larim-e Shomali

Population (2016)
  - Total: 171
- Time zone: UTC+3:30 (IRST)

Emamzadeh Mahmud (Persian: امامزاده محمود) (Note: Also romanized as Emāmzādeh Maḩmūd) is a village in Larim-e Shomali Rural District (Note: Formerly Larim Rural District) of Larim District in Juybar County, Mazandaran province, Iran.

== Demographics ==
=== Population ===
At the time of the 2006 National Census, the village's population was 146 in 36 households, when it was in Larim Rural District (Note: Renamed Larim-e Shomali Rural District) of Gil Khuran District. The following census in 2011 counted 116 people in 33 households. The 2016 census measured the population of the village as 171 people in 55 households.

In 2023, the rural district was separated from the district in the formation of Larim District and renamed Larim-e Shomali Rural District.
