= Pahnab Mahalleh =

Village in Mazandaran province, Iran

Pahnab Mahalleh Persian: پهناب محله
- Village
- Location within Iran
- Coordinates: 36°39′53″N 52°58′07″E
- Country: Iran
- Province: Mazandaran
- County: Juybar
- District: Central
- Rural District: Siyahrud

Population (2016)
  - Total: 664
- Time zone: UTC+3:30 (IRST)

Pahnab Mahalleh (Persian: پهناب محله) (Note: Also romanized as Pahnāb Maḩalleh; also known as Pahnāb) is a village in Siyahrud Rural District of the Central District in Juybar County, Mazandaran province, Iran.

== Demographics ==
=== Population ===
At the time of the 2006 National Census, the village's population was 610 in 177 households. The following census in 2011 counted 646 people in 200 households. The 2016 census measured the population of the village as 664 people in 217 households.
