= Futom =

Futom or Futam (Persian: فوتم) may refer to:

- Futom-e Olya
- Futom-e Sofla
