= Ham Chan =

Ham Chan هم چان
- Village
- Location within Iran
- Coordinates: 36°37′02″N 53°51′40″E
- Country: Iran
- Province: Mazandaran
- County: Galugah
- Bakhsh: Central
- Rural District: Tuskacheshmeh

Population (2006)
  - Total: 68
- Time zone: UTC+3:30 (IRST)

Ham Chan (Persian: هم چان, also Romanized as Ham Chān and Hamechān; also known as Hameh Chān) is a village in Tuskacheshmeh Rural District, in the Central District of Galugah County, Mazandaran Province, Iran. At the 2016 census, its population was 53, in 21 families. Down from 68 in 2006.
