= Lat Kumeh =

Lat Kumeh لت كومه
- Village
- Location within Iran
- Coordinates: 36°37′49″N 54°00′53″E
- Country: Iran
- Province: Mazandaran
- County: Galugah
- Bakhsh: Central
- Rural District: Tuskacheshmeh

Population (2006)
  - Total: 189
- Time zone: UTC+3:30 (IRST)

Lat Kumeh (Persian: لت كومه, also Romanized as Lat Kūmeh; also known as Lat Kohneh) is a village in Tuskacheshmeh Rural District, in the Central District of Galugah County, Mazandaran Province, Iran. At the 2006 census, its population was 189, in 37 families. Decreased to 60 people and 20 households in 2016.
