= Chin Parch =

Chin Parch چين پارچ
- Village
- Location within Iran
- Coordinates: 36°37′53″N 53°56′21″E
- Country: Iran
- Province: Mazandaran
- County: Galugah
- Bakhsh: Central
- Rural District: Tuskacheshmeh

Population (2006)
  - Total: 27
- Time zone: UTC+3:30 (IRST)

Chin Parch (Persian: چين پارچ, also Romanized as Chīn Pārch; also known as Chīnī Pārch) is a village in Tuskacheshmeh Rural District, in the Central District of Galugah County, Mazandaran Province, Iran. At the 2016 census, its population was 20, in 6 families. Down from 27 in 2006.
