= Farajabad, Juybar =

Farajabad فرج آباد
- Village
- Location within Iran
- Coordinates: 36°35′20″N 52°53′21″E
- Country: Iran
- Province: Mazandaran
- County: Juybar
- Bakhsh: Central
- Rural District: Hasan Reza

Population (2016)
  - Total: 24
- Time zone: UTC+3:30 (IRST)

Farajabad (Persian: فرج آباد, also Romanized as Farajābād) is a village in Hasan Reza Rural District, in the Central District of Juybar County, Mazandaran Province, Iran.

At the time of the 2006 National Census, the village's population was 31 in 10 households. The following census in 2011 recorded the same population. The 2016 census measured the population of the village as 24 people in 10 households.
