= Div Kola-ye Alimun =

Village in Mazandaran province, Iran

Div Kola-ye Alimun Persian: ديوكلااليمون
- Village
- Location within Iran
- Coordinates: 36°34′54″N 52°54′09″E
- Country: Iran
- Province: Mazandaran
- County: Juybar
- District: Central
- Rural District: Hasan Reza

Population (2016)
  - Total: 682
- Time zone: UTC+3:30 (IRST)

Div Kola-ye Alimun (Persian: ديوكلااليمون) (Note: Also romanized as Dīv Kolā-ye Alīmūn; also known as Alīmūn) is a village in Hasan Reza Rural District of the Central District in Juybar County, Mazandaran province, Iran.

== Demographics ==
=== Population ===
At the time of the 2006 National Census, the village's population was 877 in 246 households. The following census in 2011 counted 747 people in 238 households. The 2016 census measured the population of the village as 682 people in 239 households.
