= Shah Reza (disambiguation) =

Shah Reza may refer to:

- Rezā Shāh, King of Imperial State of Iran
- Shah Reza, Lorestan, a village in Lorestan Province, Iran
- Shah Reza, Mazandaran, a village in Mazandaran Province, Iran
- Shah Reza, a rapper from Bern, Switzerland

== See also ==
- Shahreza
