= Seyyed Kola, Juybar =

Seyyed Kola سيد كلا
- Village
- Location within Iran
- Coordinates: 36°35′00″N 52°55′14″E
- Country: Iran
- Province: Mazandaran
- County: Juybar
- Bakhsh: Central
- Rural District: Hasan Reza

Population (2016)
  - Total: 227
- Time zone: UTC+3:30 (IRST)

Seyyed Kola (Persian: سيد كلا, also Romanized as Seyyed Kolā; also known as Şeyd Kolā) is a village in Hasan Reza Rural District, in the Central District of Juybar County, Mazandaran Province, Iran.

At the time of the 2006 National Census, the village's population was 311 in 83 households. The following census in 2011 counted 228 people in 67 households. The 2016 census measured the population of the village as 227 people in 77 households.
