= Ramadan, Iran =

Village in Mazandaran province, Iran

Ramadan Persian: رمدان
- Village
- Location within Iran
- Coordinates: 36°36′51″N 53°48′25″E
- Country: Iran
- Province: Mazandaran
- County: Galugah
- District: Central
- Rural District: Tuskacheshmeh

Population (2016)
  - Total: 212
- Time zone: UTC+3:30 (IRST)

Ramadan (Persian: رمدان) (Note: Also romanized as Ramadān) is a village in Tuskacheshmeh Rural District of the Central District in Galugah County, Mazandaran province, Iran.

== Demographics ==
=== Population ===
At the time of the 2006 National Census, the village's population was 273 in 78 households. The following census in 2011 counted 142 people in 48 households. The 2016 census measured the population of the village as 212 people in 78 households.
