= Qadi Mahalleh, Juybar =

Qadi Mahalleh قادي محله
- Village
- Location within Iran
- Coordinates: 36°38′01″N 52°56′07″E
- Country: Iran
- Province: Mazandaran
- County: Juybar
- Bakhsh: Central
- Rural District: Siyahrud

Population (2006)
  - Total: 311
- Time zone: UTC+3:30 (IRST)
  - Summer (DST): UTC+4:30 (IRDT)

Qadi Mahalleh (Persian: قادي محله, also Romanized as Qādī Maḩalleh) is a village in Siyahrud Rural District, in the Central District of Juybar County, Mazandaran Province, Iran. At the 2006 census, its population was 311, in 87 families.
