= Bizaki =

Village in Mazandaran province, Iran

Bizaki Persian: بيزكي
- Village
- Location within Iran
- Coordinates: 36°37′17″N 52°51′22″E
- Country: Iran
- Province: Mazandaran
- County: Juybar
- District: Central
- Rural District: Hasan Reza

Population (2016)
  - Total: 1,768
- Time zone: UTC+3:30 (IRST)

Bizaki (Persian: بيزكي) (Note: Also romanized as Bīzakī and Bīzekī) is a village in Hasan Reza Rural District of the Central District in Juybar County, Mazandaran province, Iran.

== Demographics ==
=== Population ===
At the time of the 2006 National Census, the village's population was 1,589 in 415 households. The following census in 2011 counted 1,525 people in 460 households. The 2016 census measured the population of the village as 1,768 people in 596 households. It was the most populous village in its rural district.
