= Sangyab Sar =

Village in Mazandaran province, Iran

Sangyab Sar Persian: سنگ يابسر
- Village
- Location within Iran
- Coordinates: 36°43′07″N 53°39′51″E
- Country: Iran
- Province: Mazandaran
- County: Galugah
- District: Kolbad
- Rural District: Kolbad-e Gharbi

Population (2016)
  - Total: 297
- Time zone: UTC+3:30 (IRST)

Sangyab Sar (Persian: سنگ يابسر) (Note: Also romanized as Sangyāb Sar; also known as Sang Kīāb Sar) is a village in Kolbad-e Gharbi Rural District of Kolbad District in Galugah County, Mazandaran province, Iran.

== Demographics ==
=== Population ===
At the time of the 2006 National Census, the village's population was 345 in 81 households. The following census in 2011 counted 292 people in 83 households. The 2016 census measured the population of the village as 297 people in 94 households.
