= Mian Malek =

Village in Mazandaran province, Iran

Mian Malek Persian: ميان ملك
- Village
- Location within Iran
- Coordinates: 36°43′58″N 52°52′12″E
- Country: Iran
- Province: Mazandaran
- County: Juybar
- District: Gil Khuran
- Rural District: Chapakrud-e Sharqi

Population (2016)
  - Total: 400
- Time zone: UTC+3:30 (IRST)

Mian Malek (Persian: ميان ملك) (Note: Also romanized as Meyān Molk, Mian Melk, Mīān Melk, and Mīān Molk; also known as Chapak Rūd) is a village in Chapakrud-e Sharqi Rural District (Note: Formerly Gil Khuran Rural District and Chapakrud Rural District) of Gil Khuran District in Juybar County, Mazandaran province, Iran.

== Demographics ==
=== Population ===
At the time of the 2006 National Census, the village's population was 334 in 81 households, when it was in Chapakrud Rural District. (Note: Renamed Chapakrud-e Sharqi Rural District) The following census in 2011 counted 356 people in 96 households. The 2016 census measured the population of the village as 400 people in 126 households.

The rural district was renamed Chapakrud-e Sharqi Rural District in 2023.
