= Shurka =

Village in Mazandaran province, Iran

Shurka Persian: شوركا
- Village
- Location within Iran
- Coordinates: 36°40′21″N 52°56′04″E
- Country: Iran
- Province: Mazandaran
- County: Juybar
- District: Central
- Rural District: Siyahrud

Population (2016)
  - Total: 2,330
- Time zone: UTC+3:30 (IRST)

Shurka (Persian: شوركا) (Note: Also romanized as Shūrkā) is a village in Siyahrud Rural District of the Central District in Juybar County, Mazandaran province, Iran.

== Demographics ==
=== Population ===
At the time of the 2006 National Census, the village's population was 2,140 in 568 households. The following census in 2011 counted 2,342 people in 723 households. The 2016 census measured the population of the village as 2,330 people in 772 households, the most populous in its rural district.
