= Bikar Ayesh =

Village in Mazandaran province, Iran

Bikar Ayesh Persian: بيكارايش
- Village
- Location within Iran
- Coordinates: 36°41′33″N 52°52′33″E
- Country: Iran
- Province: Mazandaran
- County: Juybar
- District: Gil Khuran
- Rural District: Chapakrud-e Sharqi

Population (2016)
  - Total: 132
- Time zone: UTC+3:30 (IRST)

Bikar Ayesh (Persian: بيكارايش) (Note: Also romanized as Bīkār Āyesh; also known as Bīkārāpas) is a village in Chapakrud-e Sharqi Rural District (Note: Formerly Gil Khuran Rural District and Chapakrud Rural District) of Gil Khuran District in Juybar County, Mazandaran province, Iran.

== Demographics ==
=== Population ===
At the time of the 2006 National Census, the village's population was 127 in 32 households, when it was in Chapakrud Rural District. (Note: Renamed Chapakrud-e Sharqi Rural District) The following census in 2011 counted 123 people in 36 households. The 2016 census measured the population of the village as 132 people in 51 households.

The rural district was renamed Chapakrud-e Sharqi Rural District in 2023.
