= Sarv Kola =

Village in Mazandaran province, Iran

Sarv Kola Persian: سروكلا
- Village
- Location within Iran
- Coordinates: 36°35′27″N 52°54′29″E
- Country: Iran
- Province: Mazandaran
- County: Juybar
- District: Central
- Rural District: Hasan Reza

Population (2016)
  - Total: 1,215
- Time zone: UTC+3:30 (IRST)

Sarv Kola (Persian: سروكلا) (Note: Also romanized as Sarv Kalā and Sarv Kolā) is a village in Hasan Reza Rural District of the Central District in Juybar County, Mazandaran province, Iran.

== Demographics ==
=== Population ===
At the time of the 2006 National Census, the village's population was 1,328 in 357 households. The following census in 2011 counted 1,275 people in 393 households. The 2016 census measured the population of the village as 1,215 people in 431 households.
