= Valamazu =

Village in Mazandaran province, Iran

Valamazu Persian: ولمازو
- Village
- Location within Iran
- Coordinates: 36°42′28″N 53°42′17″E
- Country: Iran
- Province: Mazandaran
- County: Galugah
- District: Kolbad
- Rural District: Kolbad-e Gharbi

Population (2016)
  - Total: 1,028
- Time zone: UTC+3:30 (IRST)

Valamazu (Persian: ولمازو) (Note: Also romanized as Valamāzū; also known as Valeh Mūzū) is a village in Kolbad-e Gharbi Rural District of Kolbad District in Galugah County, Mazandaran province, Iran.

== Demographics ==
=== Population ===
At the time of the 2006 National Census, the village's population was 1,199 in 317 households. The following census in 2011 counted 1,135 people in 332 households. The 2016 census measured the population of the village as 1,028 people in 333 households.
