= Saraj Mahalleh, Galugah =

Village in Mazandaran province, Iran

Saraj Mahalleh Persian: سراج محله
- Village
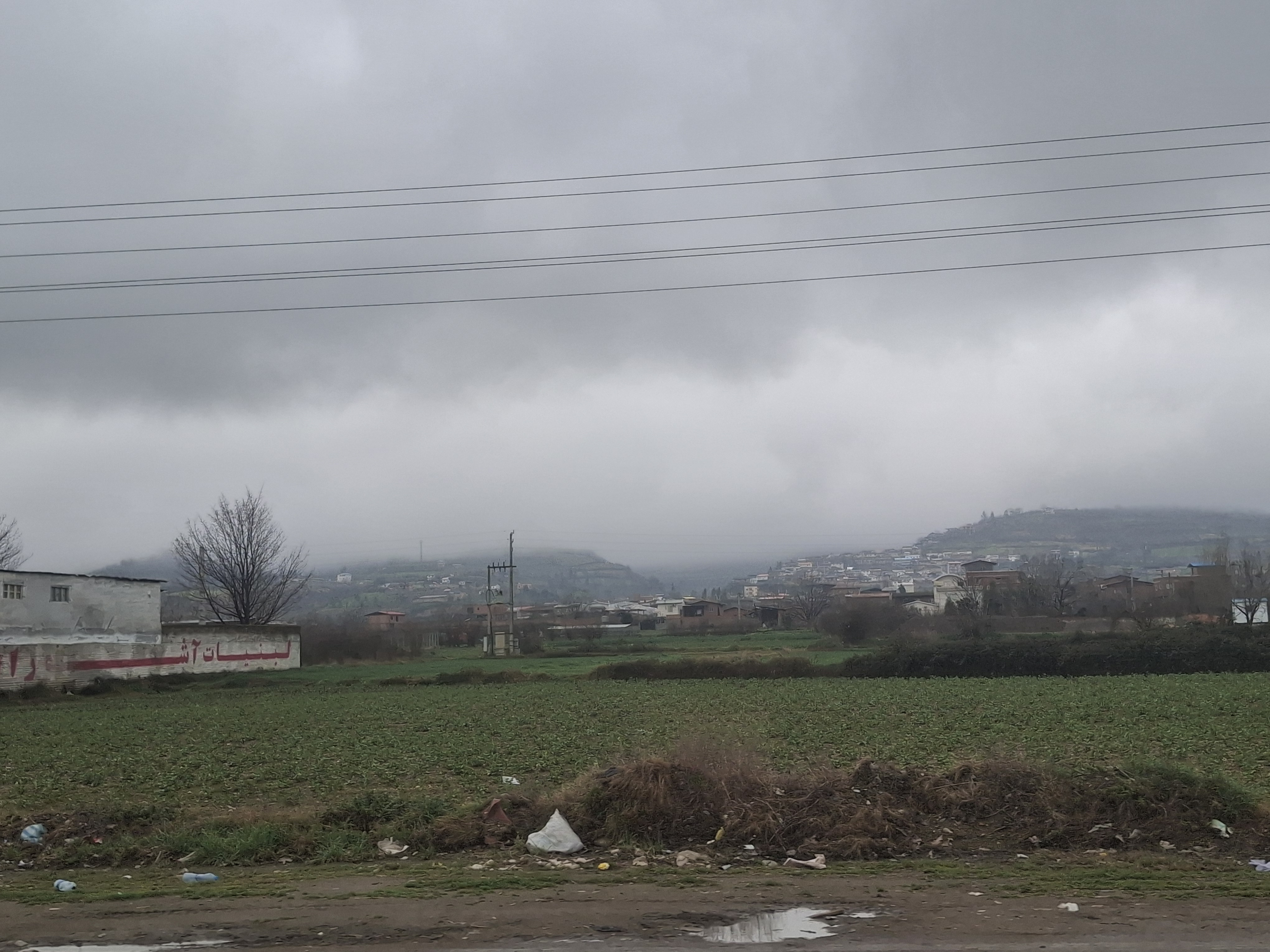
- Seraj Mahalleh in an overcast day

- Location within Iran
- Coordinates: 36°42′40″N 53°45′01″E
- Country: Iran
- Province: Mazandaran
- County: Galugah
- District: Kolbad
- Rural District: Kolbad-e Sharqi

Population (2016)
  - Total: 1,617
- Time zone: UTC+3:30 (IRST)

Saraj Mahalleh (Persian: سراج محله) (Note: Also romanized as Sarāj Maḩalleh and Serāj Maḩalleh) is a village in Kolbad-e Sharqi Rural District (Note: Formerly Kolbad Rural District) of Kolbad District in Galugah County, Mazandaran province, Iran. It is on a short distance south of Road 22, 9 km (5.6 mi) west of Galugah and 21 km (13 mi) east of Behshahr.

== Demographics ==
Seraj Mahalleh population history
Year	Pop.	±%
1950	595	—
1956	547	−8.1%
1966	749	+36.9%
1976	989	+32.0%
1986	1,471	+48.7%
2006	1,613	+9.7%
2011	1,708	+5.9%
2016	1,617	−5.3%

People of Seraj Mahalleh are Shia Muslim, they speak Mazanderani and Persian languages. Its water source was natural springs. The village's agricultural products are rice, grain and Citrus fruit. Other products that have been grown in the village include Walnut, Pomegranate, Grape and Cotton.

=== Population ===
At the time of the 2006 National Census, the village's population was 1,613 in 418 households. The following census in 2011 counted 1,708 people in 500 households. The 2016 census measured the population of the village as 1,617 people in 544 households.
