= Tappeh =

Tappeh (Persian: تپه) may refer to various places in Iran:

- Tappeh, Germi, Ardabil Province
- Tappeh, Namin, Ardabil Province
- Tappeh Now, Bushehr Province
- Tappeh, Gilan
- Tappeh, Bijar, Kurdistan Province
- Tappeh, Kamyaran, Kurdistan Province
- Tappeh, Markazi
- Tappeh, Mazandaran
- Tappeh, alternate name of Nezam Mahalleh, Mazandaran Province
- Tappeh, Behshahr, Mazandaran Province
- Tappeh-Ye-Now, Mazandaran Province
- Tappeh, North Khorasan
- Tappeh, West Azerbaijan

== See also ==
- Tappa, Indian folk music from Punjab
- Tappa, Punjab, a city in Punjab, India
