= Chalmian =

Chalmian چلميان
- Village
- Location within Iran
- Coordinates: 36°37′18″N 52°52′18″E
- Country: Iran
- Province: Mazandaran
- County: Juybar
- Bakhsh: Central
- Rural District: Hasan Reza

Population (2016)
  - Total: 245
- Time zone: UTC+3:30 (IRST)

Chalmian (Persian: چلميان, also Romanized as Chalmīān) is a village in Hasan Reza Rural District, in the Central District of Juybar County, Mazandaran Province, Iran.

At the time of the 2006 National Census, the village's population was 219 in 56 households. The following census in 2011 counted 246 people in 75 households. The 2016 census measured the population of the village as 245 people in 88 households. \
