= Azad Bon =

Village in Mazandaran province, Iran

Azad Bon Persian: ازادبن
- Village
- Location within Iran
- Coordinates: 36°39′42″N 52°57′45″E
- Country: Iran
- Province: Mazandaran
- County: Juybar
- District: Central
- Rural District: Siyahrud

Population (2016)
  - Total: 602
- Time zone: UTC+3:30 (IRST)

Azad Bon (Persian: ازادبن) (Note: Also romanized as Āzād Bon; also known as Āzād Bon Maḩalleh) is a village in Siyahrud Rural District of the Central District in Juybar County, Mazandaran province, Iran.

== Demographics ==
=== Population ===
At the time of the 2006 National Census, the village's population was 622 in 164 households. The following census in 2011 counted 632 people in 184 households. The 2016 census measured the population of the village as 602 people in 200 households.
