= Charkh Kati =

Village in Mazandaran province, Iran

Charkh Kati Persian: چرخ كتي
- Village
- Location within Iran
- Coordinates: 36°42′20″N 52°55′00″E
- Country: Iran
- Province: Mazandaran
- County: Juybar
- District: Gil Khuran
- Rural District: Chapakrud-e Sharqi

Population (2016)
  - Total: 129
- Time zone: UTC+3:30 (IRST)

Charkh Kati (Persian: چرخ كتي) (Note: Also romanized as Charkh Katī) is a village in Chapakrud-e Sharqi Rural District (Note: Formerly Gil Khuran Rural District and Chapakrud Rural District) of Gil Khuran District in Juybar County, Mazandaran province, Iran.

== Demographics ==
=== Population ===
At the time of the 2006 National Census, the village's population was 142 in 30 households, when it was in Chapakrud Rural District. (Note: Renamed Chapakrud-e Sharqi Rural District) The following census in 2011 counted 123 people in 32 households. The 2016 census measured the population of the village as 129 people in 37 households.

The rural district was renamed Chapakrud-e Sharqi Rural District in 2023.
