= Hajji Kola, Juybar =

Hajji Kola حاجي كلا
- Village
- Location within Iran
- Coordinates: 36°34′44″N 52°55′50″E
- Country: Iran
- Province: Mazandaran
- County: Juybar
- Bakhsh: Central
- Rural District: Hasan Reza

Population (2016)
  - Total: 134
- Time zone: UTC+3:30 (IRST)

Hajji Kola (Persian: حاجي كلا, also Romanized as Ḩājjī Kolā) is a village in Hasan Reza Rural District, in the Central District of Juybar County, Mazandaran Province, Iran.

At the time of the 2006 National Census, the village's population was 157 in 44 households. The following census in 2011 counted 144 people in 45 households. The 2016 census measured the population of the village as 135 people in 43 households.
