= Kord Kola =

Village in Mazandaran province, Iran

Kord Kola Persian: كردكلا
- Village
- Location within Iran
- Coordinates: 36°41′53″N 52°54′30″E
- Country: Iran
- Province: Mazandaran
- County: Juybar
- District: Gil Khuran
- Rural District: Chapakrud-e Sharqi

Population (2016)
  - Total: 1,792
- Time zone: UTC+3:30 (IRST)

Kord Kola (Persian: كردكلا) (Note: Also romanized as Kord Kolā) is a village in, and the capital of, Chapakrud-e Sharqi Rural District (Note: Formerly Gil Khuran Rural District and Chapakrud Rural District) in Gil Khuran District of Juybar County, Mazandaran province, Iran. The previous capital of the rural district was the village of Kuhi Kheyl.

== Demographics ==
=== Population ===
At the time of the 2006 National Census, the village's population was 1,631 in 397 households, when it was in Chapakrud Rural District. (Note: Renamed Chapakrud-e Sharqi Rural District) The following census in 2011 counted 1,723 people in 484 households. The 2016 census measured the population of the village as 1,792 people in 555 households. It was the most populous village in its rural district.

The rural district was renamed Chapakrud-e Sharqi Rural District in 2023.
