= Tileh Now =

Village in Mazandaran province, Iran

Tileh Now Persian: تيله نو
- Village
- Location within Iran
- Coordinates: 36°43′02″N 53°45′42″E
- Country: Iran
- Province: Mazandaran
- County: Galugah
- District: Central
- Rural District: Tuskacheshmeh

Population (2016)
  - Total: 1,641
- Time zone: UTC+3:30 (IRST)

Tileh Now (Persian: تيله نو) (Note: Also known as Tilehno, also romanized as Tīlehno) is a village in Tuskacheshmeh Rural District of the Central District in Galugah County, Mazandaran province, Iran.

== Demographics ==
=== Population ===
At the time of the 2006 National Census, the village's population was 1,561 in 405 households. The following census in 2011 counted 1,383 people in 421 households. The 2016 census measured the population of the village as 1,641 people in 516 households, the most populous in its rural district.
