= Vezvar =

Village in Mazandaran province, Iran

Vezvar Persian: وزوار
- Village
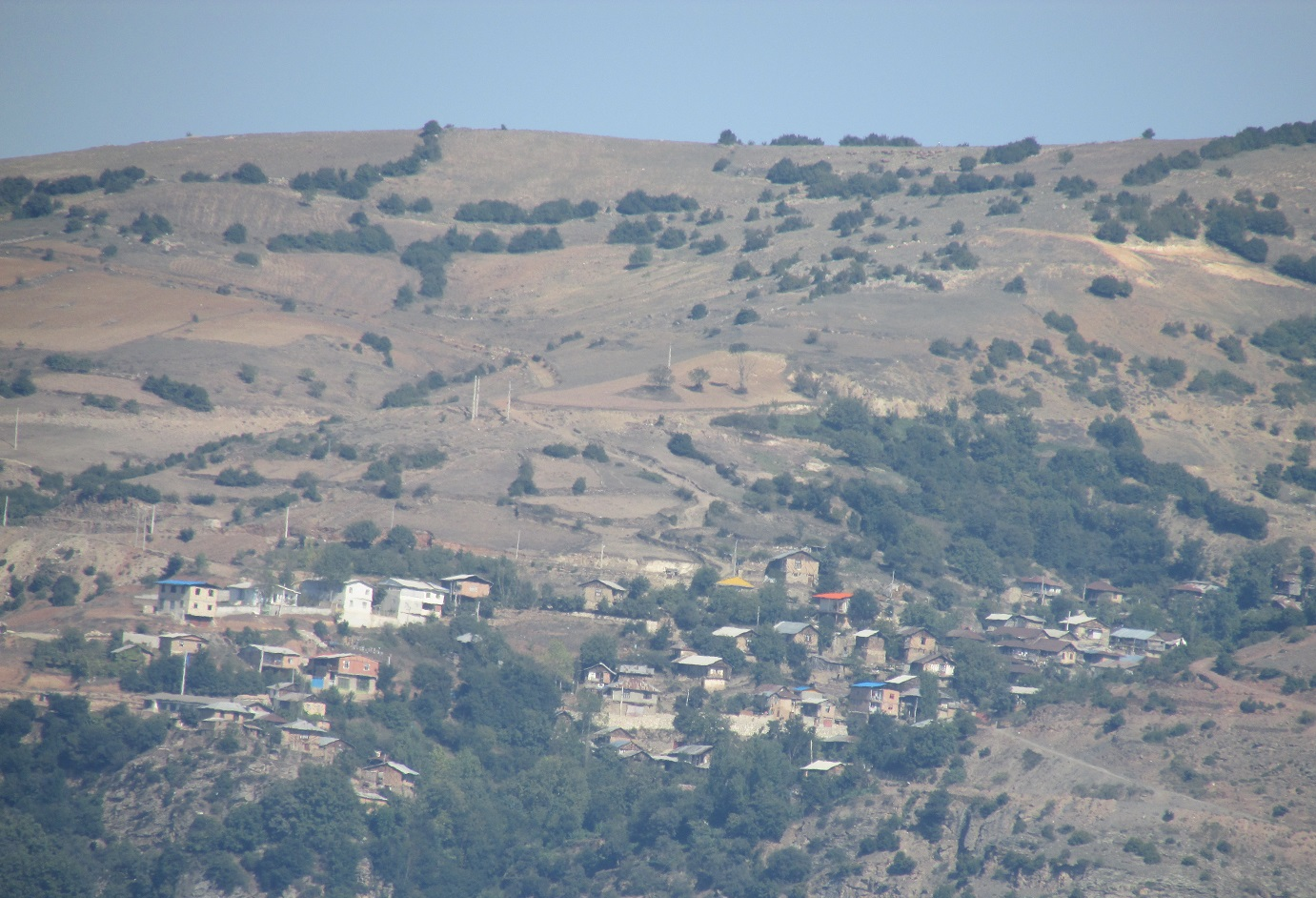
- The village of Vezvar in 2013

- Location within Iran
- Coordinates: 36°37′32″N 53°52′48″E
- Country: Iran
- Province: Mazandaran
- County: Galugah
- District: Central
- Rural District: Tuskacheshmeh

Population (2016)
  - Total: 326
- Time zone: UTC+3:30 (IRST)

Vezvar (Persian: وزوار) (Note: Also romanized as Vezvār) is a village in Tuskacheshmeh Rural District of the Central District in Galugah County, Mazandaran province, Iran.

== Demographics ==
=== Population ===
At the time of the 2006 National Census, the village's population was 331 in 104 households. The following census in 2011 counted 290 people in 116 households. The 2016 census measured the population of the village as 326 people in 122 households.
