= Evard =

Village in Mazandaran province, Iran

Evard Persian: اوارد
- Village
- Location within Iran
- Coordinates: 36°37′08″N 53°46′45″E
- Country: Iran
- Province: Mazandaran
- County: Galugah
- District: Central
- Rural District: Tuskacheshmeh

Population (2016)
  - Total: 670
- Time zone: UTC+3:30 (IRST)

Evard (Persian: اوارد) (Note: Also romanized as Avārd and Evārd) is a village in Tuskacheshmeh Rural District of the Central District in Galugah County, Mazandaran province, Iran.

== Demographics ==
=== Population ===
At the time of the 2006 National Census, the village's population was 988 in 247 households. The following census in 2011 counted 722 people in 234 households. The 2016 census measured the population of the village as 670 people in 234 households.
