= Vasu Kola =

Village in Mazandaran province, Iran

Vasu Kola Persian: واسوكلا
- Village
- Location within Iran
- Coordinates: 36°36′39″N 52°55′34″E
- Country: Iran
- Province: Mazandaran
- County: Juybar
- District: Central
- Rural District: Siyahrud

Population (2016)
  - Total: 1,176
- Time zone: UTC+3:30 (IRST)

Vasu Kola (Persian: واسوكلا) (Note: Also romanized as Vāsū Kolā; also known as Asū Kolā) is a village in Siyahrud Rural District of the Central District in Juybar County, Mazandaran province, Iran.

== Demographics ==
=== Population ===
At the time of the 2006 National Census, the village's population was 1,119 in 275 households. The following census in 2011 counted 1,248 people in 357 households. The 2016 census measured the population of the village as 1,176 people in 392 households.
