= Kukandeh =

Village in Mazandaran province, Iran

Kukandeh Persian: كوكنده
- Village
- Location within Iran
- Coordinates: 36°37′30″N 52°50′38″E
- Country: Iran
- Province: Mazandaran
- County: Juybar
- District: Central
- Rural District: Hasan Reza

Population (2016)
  - Total: 605
- Time zone: UTC+3:30 (IRST)

Kukandeh (Persian: كوكنده) (Note: Also romanized as Kūkandeh) is a village in Hasan Reza Rural District of the Central District in Juybar County, Mazandaran province, Iran.

== Demographics ==
=== Population ===
At the time of the 2006 National Census, the village's population was 611 in 151 households. The following census in 2011 counted 589 people in 174 households. The 2016 census measured the population of the village as 605 people in 206 households.
