= Gol Mahalleh, Juybar =

Village in Mazandaran province, Iran

Gol Mahalleh Persian: گل محله
- Village
- Location within Iran
- Coordinates: 36°41′59″N 52°53′55″E
- Country: Iran
- Province: Mazandaran
- County: Juybar
- District: Gil Khuran
- Rural District: Chapakrud-e Sharqi

Population (2016)
  - Total: 1,161
- Time zone: UTC+3:30 (IRST)

Gol Mahalleh (Persian: گل محله) (Note: Also romanized as Gel Mahalleh and Gel Maḩalleh) is a village in Chapakrud-e Sharqi Rural District (Note: Formerly Gil Khuran Rural District and Chapakrud Rural District) of Gil Khuran District in Juybar County, Mazandaran province, Iran.

== Demographics ==
=== Population ===
At the time of the 2006 National Census, the village's population was 1,135 in 276 households, when it was in Chapakrud Rural District. (Note: Renamed Chapakrud-e Sharqi Rural District) The following census in 2011 counted 1,138 people in 313 households. The 2016 census measured the population of the village as 1,161 people in 364 households.

The rural district was renamed Chapakrud-e Sharqi Rural District in 2023.
