= Barkala =

Village in Mazandaran province, Iran

Barkala Persian: باركلا
- Village
- Location within Iran
- Coordinates: 36°38′20″N 54°02′41″E
- Country: Iran
- Province: Mazandaran
- County: Galugah
- District: Central
- Rural District: Tuskacheshmeh

Population (2016)
  - Total: 129
- Time zone: UTC+3:30 (IRST)

Barkala (Persian: باركلا) (Note: Also romanized as Bārkalā) is a village in Tuskacheshmeh Rural District of the Central District in Galugah County, Mazandaran province, Iran.

== Demographics ==
=== Population ===
At the time of the 2006 National Census, the village's population was 103 in 29 households. The following census in 2011 counted 70 people in 26 households. The 2016 census measured the population of the village as 129 people in 40 households.
