= Qaleh-ye Payan =

Village in Mazandaran province, Iran

Qaleh-ye Payan Persian: قلعه پايان
- Village
- Location within Iran
- Coordinates: 36°42′52″N 53°40′07″E
- Country: Iran
- Province: Mazandaran
- County: Galugah
- District: Kolbad
- Rural District: Kolbad-e Gharbi

Population (2016)
  - Total: 1,168
- Time zone: UTC+3:30 (IRST)

Qaleh-ye Payan (Persian: قلعه پايان) (Note: Also romanized as Qal‘eh-ye Pāyān) is a village in, and the capital of, Kolbad-e Gharbi Rural District in Kolbad District of Galugah County, Mazandaran province, Iran.

== Demographics ==
=== Population ===
At the time of the 2006 National Census, the village's population was 1,243 in 321 households. The following census in 2011 counted 1,275 people in 386 households. The 2016 census measured the population of the village as 1,168 people in 387 households.
