= Darka Sar =

Village in Mazandaran province, Iran

Darka Sar Persian: دركاسر
- Village
- Location within Iran
- Coordinates: 36°38′35″N 52°56′56″E
- Country: Iran
- Province: Mazandaran
- County: Juybar
- District: Central
- Rural District: Siyahrud

Population (2016)
  - Total: 507
- Time zone: UTC+3:30 (IRST)

Darka Sar (Persian: دركاسر) (Note: Also romanized as Darkā Sar; also known as Darkeh Sar) is a village in Siyahrud Rural District of the Central District in Juybar County, Mazandaran province, Iran.

== Demographics ==
=== Population ===
At the time of the 2006 National Census, the village's population was 422 in 106 households. The following census in 2011 counted 468 people in 139 households. The 2016 census measured the population of the village as 507 people in 169 households.
