= Mehdi Rajeh =

Village in Mazandaran province, Iran

Mehdi Rajeh Persian: مهديرجه
- Village
- Location within Iran
- Coordinates: 36°41′41″N 53°39′38″E
- Country: Iran
- Province: Mazandaran
- County: Galugah
- District: Kolbad
- Rural District: Kolbad-e Gharbi

Population (2016)
  - Total: 1,954
- Time zone: UTC+3:30 (IRST)

Mehdi Rajeh (Persian: مهديرجه) (Note: Also romanized as Mehdī Rajeh) is a village in Kolbad-e Gharbi Rural District of Kolbad District in Galugah County, Mazandaran province, Iran.

== Demographics ==
=== Population ===
At the time of the 2006 National Census, the village's population was 2,008 in 481 households. The following census in 2011 counted 2,025 people in 535 households. The 2016 census measured the population of the village as 1,954 people in 587 households. It was the most populous village in its rural district.

== Tourism ==
In recent years, the presence of the Mehdi Rajeh Paragliding Site, considered one of the most prominent paragliding launch sites in northern Iran, has significantly contributed to attracting tourists to the area. Its favorable geographic location, unspoiled nature, and suitable weather conditions have turned Mehdi Rajeh into a popular destination for both paragliding enthusiasts and nature-loving travelers.
