= Nosratabad, Galugah =

Village in Mazandaran province, Iran

Nosratabad Persian: نصرت آباد
- Village
- Location within Iran
- Coordinates: 36°42′11″N 53°45′48″E
- Country: Iran
- Province: Mazandaran
- County: Galugah
- District: Central
- Rural District: Tuskacheshmeh

Population (2016)
  - Total: 215
- Time zone: UTC+3:30 (IRST)

Nosratabad (Persian: نصرت آباد) (Note: Also romanized as Noşratābād) is a village in Tuskacheshmeh Rural District of the Central District in Galugah County, Mazandaran province, Iran.

== Demographics ==
=== Population ===
At the time of the 2006 National Census, the village's population was 250 in 70 households. The following census in 2011 counted 245 people in 78 households. The 2016 census measured the population of the village as 215 people in 72 households.
