= Khvorshid Kola =

Village in Mazandaran province, Iran

Khvorshid Kola Persian: خورشيدكلا
- Village
- Location within Iran
- Coordinates: 36°43′34″N 53°46′48″E
- Country: Iran
- Province: Mazandaran
- County: Galugah
- District: Central
- Rural District: Azadegan

Population (2016)
  - Total: 1,647
- Time zone: UTC+3:30 (IRST)

Khvorshid Kola (Persian: خورشيدكلا) (Note: Also romanized as Khowrshīd Kolā and Khvorshīd Kolā; also known as Khūzshīd Kolā) is a village in, and the capital of, Azadegan Rural District in the Central District of Galugah County, Mazandaran province, Iran.

== Demographics ==
=== Population ===
At the time of the 2006 National Census, the village's population was 2,071 in 554 households. The following census in 2011 counted 1,850 people in 597 households. The 2016 census measured the population of the village as 1,647 people in 565 households, the most populous in its rural district.
