= Larim =

Village in Mazandaran province, Iran

Larim Persian: لاريم
- Village
- Location within Iran
- Coordinates: 36°43′20″N 52°56′11″E
- Country: Iran
- Province: Mazandaran
- County: Juybar
- District: Larim
- Rural District: Larim-e Shomali

Population (2016)
  - Total: 5,300
- Time zone: UTC+3:30 (IRST)

Larim (Persian: لاريم) (Note: Also romanized as Lārīm) is a village in, and the former capital of, Larim-e Shomali Rural District (Note: Formerly Larim Rural District) of Larim District, Juybar County, Mazandaran province, Iran, serving as capital of the district. The capital of the rural district has been transferred to the village of Pain Zarrin Kola.

== Demographics ==
=== Population ===
At the time of the 2006 National Census, the village's population was 4,768 in 1,243 households, when it was in Larim Rural District (Note: Renamed Larim-e Shomali Rural District) of Gil Khuran District. The following census in 2011 counted 4,842 people in 1,464 households. The 2016 census measured the population of the village as 5,300 people in 1,797 households, the most populous in its rural district.

In 2023, the rural district was separated from the district in the formation of Larim District and renamed Larim-e Shomali Rural District.
