= Petrud =

Village in Mazandaran province, Iran

Petrud Persian: پطرود
- Village
- Location within Iran
- Coordinates: 36°42′28″N 52°52′15″E
- Country: Iran
- Province: Mazandaran
- County: Juybar
- District: Gil Khuran
- Rural District: Chapakrud-e Sharqi

Population (2016)
  - Total: 996
- Time zone: UTC+3:30 (IRST)

Petrud (Persian: پطرود) (Note: Also romanized as Peţrūd) is a village in Chapakrud-e Sharqi Rural District (Note: Formerly Gil Khuran Rural District and Chapakrud Rural District) of Gil Khuran District in Juybar County, Mazandaran province, Iran.

== Demographics ==
=== Population ===
At the time of the 2006 National Census, the village's population was 950 in 233 households, when it was in Chapakrud Rural District. (Note: Renamed Chapakrud-e Sharqi Rural District) The following census in 2011 counted 1,025 people in 299 households. The 2016 census measured the population of the village as 996 people in 313 households.

The rural district was renamed Chapakrud-e Sharqi Rural District in 2023.
