= Kia Mahalleh, Mazandaran =

Kia Mahalleh كيامحله
- Village
- Location within Iran
- Coordinates: 36°40′58″N 52°57′37″E
- Country: Iran
- Province: Mazandaran
- County: Juybar
- Bakhsh: Central
- Rural District: Siyahrud

Population (2006)
  - Total: 445
- Time zone: UTC+3:30 (IRST)
  - Summer (DST): UTC+4:30 (IRDT)

Kia Mahalleh (Persian: كيامحله, also Romanized as Kīā Maḩalleh) is a village in Siyahrud Rural District, in the Central District of Juybar County, Mazandaran Province, Iran. At the 2006 census, its population was 445, in 125 families.
