= Kalleh Bon =

Village in Mazandaran province, Iran

Kalleh Bon Persian: كله بن
- Village
- Location within Iran
- Coordinates: 36°35′07″N 52°52′12″E
- Country: Iran
- Province: Mazandaran
- County: Juybar
- District: Central
- Rural District: Hasan Reza

Population (2016)
  - Total: 445
- Time zone: UTC+3:30 (IRST)

Kalleh Bon (Persian: كله بن) (Note: Also romanized as Kaleh Bon) is a village in Hasan Reza Rural District of the Central District in Juybar County, Mazandaran province, Iran.

== Demographics ==
=== Population ===
At the time of the 2006 National Census, the village's population was 500 in 144 households. The following census in 2011 counted 492 people in 157 households. The 2016 census measured the population of the village as 445 people in 164 households.
