= Reyhanabad, Mazandaran =

Village in Mazandaran province, Iran

Reyhanabad Persian: ريحان آباد
- Village
- Location within Iran
- Coordinates: 36°43′07″N 53°41′58″E
- Country: Iran
- Province: Mazandaran
- County: Galugah
- District: Kolbad
- Rural District: Kolbad-e Sharqi

Population (2016)
  - Total: 956
- Time zone: UTC+3:30 (IRST)

Reyhanabad (Persian: ريحان آباد) (Note: Also romanized as Reyḩānābād) is a village in Kolbad-e Sharqi Rural District (Note: Formerly Kolbad Rural District) of Kolbad District in Galugah County, Mazandaran province, Iran.

== Demographics ==
=== Population ===
At the time of the 2006 National Census, the village's population was 970 in 265 households. The following census in 2011 counted 1,011 people in 306 households. The 2016 census measured the population of the village as 956 people in 320 households.
