= Miandeh, Juybar =

Village in Mazandaran province, Iran

Miandeh Persian: ميانده
- Village
- Location within Iran
- Coordinates: 36°39′12″N 52°50′02″E
- Country: Iran
- Province: Mazandaran
- County: Juybar
- District: Central
- Rural District: Hasan Reza

Population (2016)
  - Total: 468
- Time zone: UTC+3:30 (IRST)

Miandeh (Persian: ميانده) (Note: Also romanized as Meyān Deh, Mīān Deh, and Mīāndeh) is a village in Hasan Reza Rural District of the Central District in Juybar County, Mazandaran province, Iran.

== Demographics ==
=== Population ===
At the time of the 2006 National Census, the village's population was 425 in 110 households. The following census in 2011 counted 434 people in 124 households. The 2016 census measured the population of the village as 468 people in 159 households.
