= Talnar =

Village in Mazandaran province, Iran

Talnar Persian: تلنار
- Village
- Location within Iran
- Coordinates: 36°44′31″N 52°54′06″E
- Country: Iran
- Province: Mazandaran
- County: Juybar
- District: Gil Khuran
- Rural District: Chapakrud-e Sharqi

Population (2016)
  - Total: 130
- Time zone: UTC+3:30 (IRST)

Talnar (Persian: تلنار) (Note: Also romanized as Talnār; also known as Taknār and Tal Nāz) is a village in Chapakrud-e Sharqi Rural District (Note: Formerly Gil Khuran Rural District and Chapakrud Rural District) of Gil Khuran District in Juybar County, Mazandaran province, Iran.

== Demographics ==
=== Population ===
At the time of the 2006 National Census, the village's population was 140 in 38 households, when it was in Chapakrud Rural District. (Note: Renamed Chapakrud-e Sharqi Rural District) The following census in 2011 counted 140 people in 36 households. The 2016 census measured the population of the village as 130 people in 40 households.

The rural district was renamed Chapakrud-e Sharqi Rural District in 2023.
