= Hiala =

Hiala may refer to:

- Hiala, Nawanshahr, a village in Punjab, India
- Niala, Iran, also known as Hiala, a village in Mazandaran Province, Iran

== See also ==
- Hyala, a genus of snails
- Chiala mountain salamander
