= Emamzadeh Mahmud =

Emamzadeh Mahmud (Persian: امامزاده محمود) may refer to:

- Emamzadeh Mahmud, Kohgiluyeh and Boyer-Ahmad
- Emamzadeh Mahmud, Mazandaran
