= Shahneh Kola =

Shahneh Kola (Persian: شهنه كلا) may refer to:

- Shahneh Kola, Amol
- Shahneh Kola, Juybar
