= Qadi Mahalleh =

Qadi Mahalleh (Persian: قادي محله) may refer to:

- Qadi Mahalleh, Amol
- Qadi Mahalleh, Babolsar
- Qadi Mahalleh, Juybar
