= Ali Kola, Juybar =

Village in Mazandaran province, Iran

Ali Kola Persian: علی کلا
- Village
- Location within Iran
- Coordinates: 36°45′N 52°54′E
- Country: Iran
- Province: Mazandaran
- County: Juybar
- District: Gil Khuran
- Rural District: Chapakrud-e Sharqi

Population (2016)
  - Total: 98
- Time zone: UTC+3:30 (IRST)

Ali Kola (Persian: علی كلا) (Note: Also romanized as ‘Alī Kolā) is a village in Chapakrud-e Sharqi Rural District (Note: Formerly Gil Khuran Rural District and Chapakrud Rural District) of Gil Khuran District in Juybar County, Mazandaran province, Iran.

== Demographics ==
=== Population ===
At the time of the 2006 National Census, the village's population was 94 in 26 households, when it was in Chapakrud Rural District. (Note: Renamed Chapakrud-e Sharqi Rural District) The following census in 2011 counted 103 people in 32 households. The 2016 census measured the population of the village as 98 people in 30 households.

The rural district was renamed Chapakrud-e Sharqi Rural District in 2023.
