= Kolkat =

Kolkat may refer to:

- Kolkata, India, also known as Calcutta
- Geghadir, Shirak, Armenia
- Kolkat, Iran, a village in Mazandaran Province
