= Dehi, Mazandaran =

Dehi دهی
- Village
- Location within Iran
- Coordinates: 36°38′05″N 53°59′46″E
- Country: Iran
- Province: Mazandaran
- County: Galugah
- Bakhsh: Central
- Rural District: Tuskacheshmeh

Population (2006)
  - Total: 140
- Time zone: UTC+3:30 (IRST)

Dehi (Persian: دهی, also Romanized as Dehī) is a village in Tuskacheshmeh Rural District, in the Central District of Galugah County, Mazandaran Province, Iran. At the 2016 census, its population was 75, in 24 families. Decreased from 140 people in 2006.
