= Masaf =

Masaf or MASAF may refer to:

- the MASAF assault rifle made in Iran, see List of assault rifles
- the Mediterranean Allied Strategic Air Force, a combat command of the Mediterranean Allied Air Forces
- the Ministry of Agriculture, Food Sovereignty and Forests (Italy)
- Mosayyeb Mahalleh, a village in Mazandaran Province, Iran
