= Țepeș (surname) =

Țepeș is a Romanian surname. Notable people with the surname include:

- Andrei Țepeș (born 1991), Romanian footballer
- Vlad III the Impaler (a.k.a. Vlad Țepeș; 1431–1476), Romanian nobleman
- Vlad Țepeș (disambiguation), multiple people
