= Tappeh, Mazandaran =

Village in Mazandaran province, Iran

Tappeh Persian: تپه
- Village
- Location within Iran
- Coordinates: 36°42′55″N 53°47′30″E
- Country: Iran
- Province: Mazandaran
- County: Galugah
- District: Central
- Rural District: Azadegan

Population (2016)
  - Total: 83
- Time zone: UTC+3:30 (IRST)

Tappeh (Persian: تپه) is a village in Azadegan Rural District of the Central District in Galugah County, Mazandaran province, Iran.

== Demographics ==
=== Population ===
At the time of the 2006 National Census, the village's population was 78 in 23 households. The following census in 2011 counted 91 people in 30 households. The 2016 census measured the population of the village as 83 people in 29 households.
