= Futom-e Sofla =

Futom-e Sofla فوتم سفلی
- Village
- Location within Iran
- Coordinates: 36°36′06″N 52°51′56″E
- Country: Iran
- Province: Mazandaran
- County: Juybar
- Bakhsh: Central
- Rural District: Hasan Reza

Population (2016)
  - Total: 64
- Time zone: UTC+3:30 (IRST)

Futom-e Sofla (Persian: فوتم سفلی, also Romanized as Fūtom-e Soflá; also known as Fūtam-e Pā’īn, Pā’īn Fūtam, and Pā’īn Fūtom) is a village in Hasan Reza Rural District, in the Central District of Juybar County, Mazandaran Province, Iran.

At the time of the 2006 National Census, the village's population was 110 in 29 households. The following census in 2011 counted 85 people in 25 households. The 2016 census measured the population of the village as 64 people in 23 households.
