= Saraj Mahalleh, Juybar =

Village in Mazandaran province, Iran

Saraj Mahalleh Persian: سراج محله
- Village
- Location within Iran
- Coordinates: 36°37′32″N 52°55′43″E
- Country: Iran
- Province: Mazandaran
- County: Juybar
- District: Central
- Rural District: Siyahrud

Population (2016)
  - Total: 544
- Time zone: UTC+3:30 (IRST)

Saraj Mahalleh (Persian: سراج محله) (Note: Also romanized as Sarāj Maḩalleh, Seraj Mahalleh, and Serāj Maḩalleh) is a village in Siyahrud Rural District of the Central District in Juybar County, Mazandaran province, Iran.

== Demographics ==
=== Population ===
At the time of the 2006 National Census, the village's population was 551 in 154 households. The following census in 2011 counted 544 people in 172 households. The 2016 census measured the population of the village as 544 people in 185 households.
