= Dehi =

Dehi may refer to:

- Dehi, Mazandaran, Iran
- Dehi, Iraq
