= Mosayyeb Mahalleh =

Mosayyeb Mahalleh مصيب محله
- Village
- Location within Iran
- Coordinates: 36°37′15″N 53°50′49″E
- Country: Iran
- Province: Mazandaran
- County: Galugah
- Bakhsh: Central
- Rural District: Tuskacheshmeh

Population (2016)
  - Total: 95
- Time zone: UTC+3:30 (IRST)

Mosayyeb Mahalleh (Persian: مصيب محله, also Romanized as Moşayyeb Maḩalleh; also known as Masaf and Moşaf) is a village in Tuskacheshmeh Rural District, in the Central District of Galugah County, Mazandaran Province, Iran. At the 2016 census, its population was 95, in 33 families. Up from 91 in 2006.
