= Esmail Kola-ye Kuchek =

Village in Mazandaran province, Iran

Esmail Kola-ye Kuchek Persian: اسماعيل كلاكوچك
- Village
- Location within Iran
- Coordinates: 36°35′37″N 52°52′55″E
- Country: Iran
- Province: Mazandaran
- County: Juybar
- District: Central
- Rural District: Hasan Reza

Population (2016)
  - Total: 408
- Time zone: UTC+3:30 (IRST)

Esmail Kola-ye Kuchek (Persian: اسماعيل كلاكوچك) (Note: Also romanized as Esmā‘īl Kolā-ye Kūchek) is a village in Hasan Reza Rural District of the Central District in Juybar County, Mazandaran province, Iran.

== Demographics ==
=== Population ===
At the time of the 2006 National Census, the village's population was 489 in 122 households. The following census in 2011 counted 438 people in 136 households. The 2016 census measured the population of the village as 408 people in 146 households.
