= Kolkat, Iran =

Kolkat كلكت
- Village
- Location within Iran
- Coordinates: 36°37′54″N 53°58′32″E
- Country: Iran
- Province: Mazandaran
- County: Galugah
- Bakhsh: Central
- Rural District: Tuskacheshmeh

Population (2016)
  - Total: 67
- Time zone: UTC+3:30 (IRST)

Kolkat (Persian: كلكت) is a village in Tuskacheshmeh Rural District, in the Central District of Galugah County, Mazandaran Province, Iran. At the 2016 census, its population was 67, in 28 families. Up from 49 people in 2006.
