= Kia Mahalleh =

Kia Mahalleh (Persian: كيامحله) may refer to:

- Kia Mahalleh, Alborz
- Kia Mahalleh, Mazandaran
