= Esmail Kola-ye Bozorg =

Village in Mazandaran province, Iran

Esmail Kola-ye Bozorg Persian: اسماعيل كلابزرگ
- Village
- Location within Iran
- Coordinates: 36°38′38″N 52°49′34″E
- Country: Iran
- Province: Mazandaran
- County: Juybar
- District: Central
- Rural District: Hasan Reza

Population (2016)
  - Total: 444
- Time zone: UTC+3:30 (IRST)

Esmail Kola-ye Bozorg (Persian: اسماعيل كلابزرگ) (Note: Also romanized as Esmā‘īl Kolā-ye Bozorg; also known as A‘eyl Kolā-ye Bozorg) is a village in Hasan Reza Rural District of the Central District in Juybar County, Mazandaran province, Iran.

== Demographics ==
=== Population ===
At the time of the 2006 National Census, the village's population was 406 in 105 households. The following census in 2011 counted 441 people in 126 households. The 2016 census measured the population of the village as 444 people in 152 households.
