= Futom-e Olya =

Futom-e Olya فوتم عليا
- Village
- Location within Iran
- Coordinates: 36°35′16″N 52°51′42″E
- Country: Iran
- Province: Mazandaran
- County: Juybar
- Bakhsh: Central
- Rural District: Hasan Reza

Population (2016)
  - Total: 314
- Time zone: UTC+3:30 (IRST)

Futom-e Olya (Persian: فوتم عليا, also Romanized as Fūtom-e ‘Olyā; also known as Fūtom and Fūtom-e Bālā) is a village in Hasan Reza Rural District, in the Central District of Juybar County, Mazandaran Province, Iran.

At the time of the 2006 National Census, the village's population was 301 in 72 households. The following census in 2011 counted 284 people in 79 households. The 2016 census measured the population of the village as 314 people in 106 households.
