= Lak Dasht =

Lak Dasht (Persian: لاك دشت) may refer to:

- Lak Dasht, Juybar
- Lak Dasht, Sari
