= Ali Kola =

Ali Kola or Ali Kala or Alikola (Persian: عالي كلا or علي كلا) may refer to:

- Ali Kola, Amol
- Ali Kola, Juybar
- Ali Kola, Sari
