= Nezam Mahalleh =

Village in Mazandaran province, Iran

Nezam Mahalleh Persian: نظام محله
- Village
- Location within Iran
- Coordinates: 36°43′06″N 53°47′27″E
- Country: Iran
- Province: Mazandaran
- County: Galugah
- District: Central
- Rural District: Azadegan

Population (2016)
  - Total: 839
- Time zone: UTC+3:30 (IRST)

Nezam Mahalleh (Persian: نظام محله) (Note: Also romanized as Nez̧ām Maḩalleh; also known as Tappeh and Tappeh Sar) is a village in Azadegan Rural District of the Central District in Galugah County, Mazandaran province, Iran.

== Demographics ==
=== Population ===
At the time of the 2006 National Census, the village's population was 895 in 237 households. The following census in 2011 counted 928 people in 276 households. The 2016 census measured the population of the village as 839 people in 296 households.
