= Shahneh Kola, Juybar =

Shahneh Kola شهنه كلا
- Village
- Location within Iran
- Coordinates: 36°39′40″N 52°48′58″E
- Country: Iran
- Province: Mazandaran
- County: Juybar
- Bakhsh: Central
- Rural District: Hasan Reza

Population (2016)
  - Total: 171
- Time zone: UTC+3:30 (IRST)

Shahneh Kola (Persian: شهنه كلا, also Romanized as Shahneh Kolā) is a village in Hasan Reza Rural District, in the Central District of Juybar County, Mazandaran Province, Iran.

At the time of the 2006 National Census, the village's population was 172 in 39 households. The following census in 2011 counted 163 people in 46 households. The 2016 census measured the population of the village as 171 people in 57 households.
