= Tepi =

Tepi may refer to:

- Tepi, Ethiopia, a town in Ethiopia
- Tepi, Georgia, a village in Georgia
- Tepi Länsivuori (born 1945), Finnish motorcycle road racer
- Tepi Moilanen (born 1973), Finnish football player

== See also ==
- Tepe (disambiguation)
- Tipi (disambiguation)
