= Niala, Iran =

Village in Mazandaran province, Iran

Niala Persian: نيالا
- Village
- Location within Iran
- Coordinates: 36°37′08″N 53°49′12″E
- Country: Iran
- Province: Mazandaran
- County: Galugah
- District: Central
- Rural District: Tuskacheshmeh

Population (2016)
  - Total: 443
- Time zone: UTC+3:30 (IRST)

Niala (Persian: نيالا) (Note: Also romanized as Neyālā and Nīālā; also known as Hīāla and Netālā) is a village in, and the capital of, Tuskacheshmeh Rural District in the Central District of Galugah County, Mazandaran province, Iran.

== Demographics ==
=== Population ===
At the time of the 2006 National Census, the village's population was 381 in 107 households. The following census in 2011 counted 239 people in 79 households. The 2016 census measured the population of the village as 443 people in 155 households.
