= Lemrask =

Village in Mazandaran province, Iran

Lemrask Persian: لمراسک
- Village
- Location within Iran
- Coordinates: 36°42′50″N 53°44′07″E
- Country: Iran
- Province: Mazandaran
- County: Galugah
- District: Kolbad
- Rural District: Kolbad-e Sharqi

Population (2016)
  - Total: 2,285
- Time zone: UTC+3:30 (IRST)

Lemrask (Persian: لمراسک) (Note: Also romanized as Lemrāsk) is a village in Kolbad-e Sharqi Rural District (Note: Formerly Kolbad Rural District) of Kolbad District in Galugah County, Mazandaran province, Iran, serving as capital of both the district and rural district.

== Demographics ==
=== Population ===
At the time of the 2006 National Census, the village's population was 2,782 in 776 households. The following census in 2011 counted 2,524 people in 783 households. The 2016 census measured the population of the village as 2,285 people in 785 households.
