= Kuhi Kheyl =

City in Mazandaran province, Iran

Kuhi Kheyl Persian: كوهي خيل
- City
- Location within Iran
- Coordinates: 36°41′19″N 52°54′40″E
- Country: Iran
- Province: Mazandaran
- County: Juybar
- District: Gil Khuran
- Established as a city: 2004
- Elevation: 5–50 m (16–164 ft)

Population (2016)
  - Total: 2,242
- Time zone: UTC+3:30 (IRST)
- Area code: 0124

Kuhi Kheyl (Persian: كوهي خيل) (Note: Also romanized as Kūhī Kheyl and Kūhīkheyl) is a city in, and the capital of, Gil Khuran District in Juybar County, Mazandaran province, Iran. It was the capital of Gil Khuran Rural District (Note: Renamed Chapakrud Rural District and Chapakrud-e Sharqi Rural District) until its capital was transferred to the village of Kord Kola. The village of Kuhi Kheyl was converted to a city in 2004.

== Demographics ==
=== Population ===
At the time of the 2006 National Census, the city's population was 1,939 in 499 households. The following census in 2011 counted 2,061 people in 608 households. The 2016 census measured the population of the city as 2,242 people in 736 households.
