= Tepe =

Tepe may refer to:

== Places ==
- Tépe, a village and municipality in Hungary
- Tepe, Iran, a village in Markazi Province
- Tepe, Slovenia, a settlement in the Municipality of Litija
- Tepe, Bismil, Turkey, a neighborhood of Bismil
- Tepe, Dicle, Turkey, a neighborhood of Dicle
- Göbekli Tepe, Turkey, Neolithic archaeological site
- Tepe, Gülnar, Turkey, a neighborhood of Gülnar
- Tepe, Lice, Turkey, a neighborhood of Lice
- Tepe, Nallıhan, Turkey, a neighborhood of Nallıhan
- Tepe or Tepeköy, Seben, Turkey, a village

== People ==
- Gökhan Tepe (born 1978), Turkish singer
- Lou Tepe (born 1930), American former National Football League player
- Marie Tepe (1834–1901), French-Turkish woman who aided the Union Army during the American Civil War as a vivandière
- Muhammet Taha Tepe (born 2001), Turkish football goalkeeper

== Other uses ==
- Battle of Tepe, a 1914 World War I skirmish between German and British forces in Kamerun, Africa
- the Turkish and Persian word for tell (archaeology), a type of earthen mound
- a brand of interdental brush

== See also ==
- Tappeh (disambiguation), places in Iran
