= Tuskacheshmeh Rural District =

Rural district in Mazandaran province, Iran

Tuskacheshmeh Rural District Persian: دهستان توسكاچشمه
- Rural District
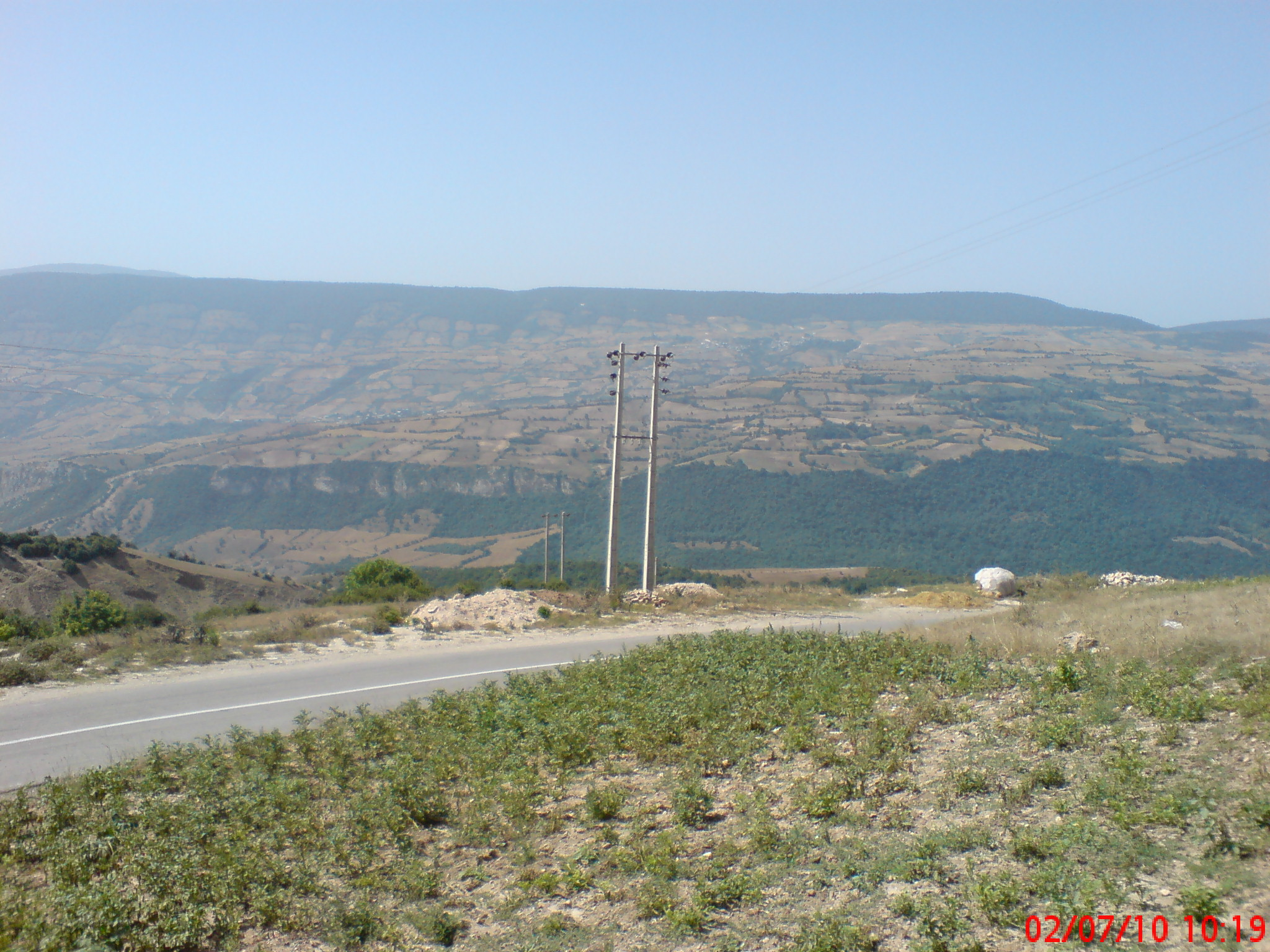
- View from Niala

- Location within Iran
- Coordinates: 36°39′N 53°54′E
- Country: Iran
- Province: Mazandaran
- County: Galugah
- District: Central
- Established: 2005
- Capital: Niala

Population (2016)
  - Total: 4,301
- Time zone: UTC+3:30 (IRST)

Tuskacheshmeh Rural District (Persian: دهستان توسكاچشمه) is in the Central District of Galugah County, Mazandaran province, Iran. Its capital is the village of Niala.

== Demographics ==
=== Population ===
At the time of the 2006 National Census, the rural district's population was 4,930 in 1,285 households. There were 3,787 inhabitants in 1,234 households at the 2011 census. The 2016 census measured the population of the rural district as 4,301 in 1,464 households. The most populous of its 16 villages was Tileh Now, with 1,641 people.

=== Other villages in the rural district ===
- Aghuz Darreh
- Barkala
- Chin Parch
- Dehi
- Evard
- Ham Chan
- Kolkat
- Lat Kumeh
- Mosayyeb Mahalleh
- Nosratabad
- Ramadan
- Vezvar
- Viva
