= Hasan Reza Rural District =

Rural district in Mazandaran province, Iran

Hasan Reza Rural District Persian: دهستان حسن رضا
- Rural District
- Location within Iran
- Coordinates: 36°37′N 52°53′E
- Country: Iran
- Province: Mazandaran
- County: Juybar
- District: Central
- Established: 1997
- Capital: Shib Ab Bandan

Population (2016)
  - Total: 8,181
- Time zone: UTC+3:30 (IRST)

Hasan Reza Rural District (Persian: دهستان حسن رضا) is in the Central District of Juybar County, Mazandaran province, Iran. Its capital is the village of Shib Ab Bandan.

== Demographics ==
=== Population ===
At the time of the 2006 National Census, the rural district's population was 8,292 in 2,167 households. There were 8,024 inhabitants in 2,419 households at the following census of 2011. The 2016 census measured the population of the rural district as 8,181 in 2,823 households. The most populous of its 19 villages was Bizaki, with 1,768 people.

=== Other villages in the rural district ===
- Alimun
- Azan
- Chalmian
- Div Kola-ye Alimun
- Esmail Kola-ye Bozorg
- Esmail Kola-ye Kuchek
- Farajabad
- Futom-e Olya
- Futom-e Sofla
- Hajji Kola
- Kalleh Bon
- Kukandeh
- Miandeh
- Sarv Kola
- Seyyed Kola
- Shahneh Kola
