= Azadegan Rural District (Galugah County) =

Rural district in Mazandaran province, Iran

Azadegan Rural District Persian: دهستان آزادگان
- Rural District
- Location within Iran
- Coordinates: 36°44′N 53°49′E
- Country: Iran
- Province: Mazandaran
- County: Galugah
- District: Central
- Established: 2005
- Capital: Khvorshid Kola

Population (2016)
  - Total: 2,569
- Time zone: UTC+3:30 (IRST)

Azadegan Rural District (Persian: دهستان آزادگان) is in the Central District of Galugah County, Mazandaran province, Iran. Its capital is the village of Khvorshid Kola.

== Demographics ==
=== Population ===
At the time of the 2006 National Census, the rural district's population was 3,044 in 814 households. There were 2,869 inhabitants in 903 households at the following census of 2011. The 2016 census measured the population of the rural district as 2,569 in 890 households. The most populous of its 12 villages was Khvorshid Kola, with 1,647 people. The rural district had three populated villages, a fishing ground, a cooperative fishing company, three livestock sites, and an environmental base.

=== Other villages in the rural district ===
- Nezam Mahalleh
- Tappeh
