= Chapakrud-e Gharbi Rural District =

Rural district in Mazandaran province, Iran

Chapakrud-e Gharbi Rural District Persian: دهستان چپکرود غربی
- Rural District
- Location within Iran
- Coordinates: 36°42′N 52°52′E
- Country: Iran
- Province: Mazandaran
- County: Juybar
- District: Gil Khuran
- Established: 2023
- Capital: Anar Marz
- Time zone: UTC+3:30 (IRST)

Chapakrud-e Gharbi Rural District (Persian: دهستان چپکرود غربی) is in Gil Khuran District of Juybar County, Mazandaran province, Iran. Its capital is the village of Anar Marz, whose population at the time of the 2016 National Census was 1,428 in 441 households.

== History ==
Chapakrud-e Gharbi Rural District was created in Gil Khuran District in 2023.

== Other villages in the rural district ==
- Anbarsar
- Dunchal
- Goldasht
- Lak Dasht
- Lapu Sahra
- Mistan
- Naft Chal
- Pain Zoghal Manzel
