= Hiala, Nawanshahr =

Hiala
- Village
- Location in Punjab, India Hiala (India)
- Coordinates: 31.0940744°N 76.1083245°E
- Country: India
- State: Punjab
- District: Shaheed Bhagat Singh Nagar

Government
  - Type: Panchayat raj
  - Body: Gram panchayat
- Elevation: 355 m (1,165 ft)

Population (2011)
  - Total: 1,477
- Sex ratio 776/701 ♂/♀

Languages
  - Official: Punjabi
- Time zone: UTC+5:30 (IST)
- PIN: 144517
- Telephone code: 01823
- ISO 3166 code: IN-PB
- Post office: Rahon
- Website: nawanshahr.nic.in

Hiala or Hayala is a village in Shaheed Bhagat Singh Nagar district of Punjab State, India. It is located 6 kilometres (3.7 mi) away from postal head office Rahon, 24 kilometres (15 mi) from Balachaur, 8.6 kilometres (5.3 mi) from district headquarter Shaheed Bhagat Singh Nagar and 94 kilometres (58 mi) from state capital Chandigarh. The village is administrated by Sarpanch an elected representative of the village.

== Demography ==
As of 2011, Hiala has a total number of 326 houses and population of 1477 of which 776 include are males while 701 are females according to the report published by Census India in 2011. The literacy rate of Hiala is 77.34%, higher than the state average of 75.84%. The population of children under the age of 6 years is 109 which is 7.38% of total population of Hiala, and child sex ratio is approximately 817 as compared to Punjab state average of 846.

Most of the people are from Schedule Caste which constitutes 27.62% of total population in Hiala. The town does not have any Schedule Tribe population so far.

As per the report published by Census India in 2011, 510 people were engaged in work activities out of the total population of Hiala which includes 484 males and 26 females. According to census survey report 2011, 83.92% workers describe their work as main work and 16.08% workers are involved in Marginal activity providing livelihood for less than 6 months.

== See also ==
- List of villages in India
