= Kolbad-e Sharqi Rural District =

Rural district in Mazandaran province, Iran

Kolbad-e Sharqi Rural District Persian: دهستان كلباد شرقي
- Rural District
- Location within Iran
- Coordinates: 36°43′N 53°44′E
- Country: Iran
- Province: Mazandaran
- County: Galugah
- District: Kolbad
- Established: 1987
- Capital: Lemrask

Population (2016)
  - Total: 7,409
- Time zone: UTC+3:30 (IRST)

Kolbad-e Sharqi Rural District (Persian: دهستان كلباد شرقي) (Note: Formerly Kolbad Rural District (دهستان كلباد)) is in Kolbad District of Galugah County, Mazandaran province, Iran. Its capital is the village of Lemrask.

== Demographics ==
=== Population ===
At the time of the 2006 National Census, the rural district's population was 7,951 in 2,135 households. There were 7,839 inhabitants in 2,344 households at the following census of 2011. The 2016 census measured the population of the rural district as 7,409 in 2,494 households. The most populous of its five villages was Tir Tash, with 2,551 people.

The rural district consisted of four populated villages and a cooperative fishing company.

=== Other villages in the rural district ===
- Reyhanabad
- Saraj Mahalleh
