= Tork Mahalleh-ye Alalan =

Tork Mahalleh-ye Alalan ترك محله الالان
- Village
- Location within Iran
- Coordinates: 37°43′15″N 48°59′46″E
- Country: Iran
- Province: Gilan
- County: Talesh
- Bakhsh: Asalem
- Rural District: Asalem

Population (2006)
  - Total: 194
- Time zone: UTC+3:30 (IRST)
  - Summer (DST): UTC+4:30 (IRDT)

Tork Mahalleh-ye Alalan (Persian: ترك محله الالان, also Romanized as Tork Maḩalleh-ye Ālālān; also known as Tork Maḩalleh) is a village in Asalem Rural District, Asalem District, Talesh County, Gilan Province, Iran. At the 2006 census, its population was 194, in 44 families.
