= Meshkabad-e Qadim =

Meshkabad-e Qadim مشگ ابادقديم
- Village
- Location within Iran
- Coordinates: 37°17′41″N 46°43′07″E
- Country: Iran
- Province: East Azerbaijan
- County: Hashtrud
- Bakhsh: Nazarkahrizi
- Rural District: Nazarkahrizi

Population (2006)
  - Total: 58
- Time zone: UTC+3:30 (IRST)
  - Summer (DST): UTC+4:30 (IRDT)

Meshkabad-e Qadim (Persian: مشگ ابادقديم, also Romanized as Meshkābād-e Qadīm) is a village in Nazarkahrizi Rural District, Nazarkahrizi District, Hashtrud County, East Azerbaijan Province, Iran. At the 2006 census, its population was 58, in 9 families.
