= Hoseyn Beygi =

Hoseyn Beygi حسين بگي
- Village
- Location within Iran
- Coordinates: 30°42′00″N 48°44′44″E
- Country: Iran
- Province: Khuzestan
- County: Shadegan
- Bakhsh: Central
- Rural District: Buzi

Population (2006)
  - Total: 85
- Time zone: UTC+3:30 (IRST)
  - Summer (DST): UTC+4:30 (IRDT)

Hoseyn Beygi (Persian: حسين بگي, also Romanized as Ḩoseyn Beygī; also known as Ḩoseyn Yagī) is a village in Buzi Rural District, in the Central District of Shadegan County, Khuzestan Province, Iran. At the 2006 census, its population was 85, in 16 families.
