= Kolbad-e Gharbi Rural District =

Rural district in Mazandaran province, Iran

Kolbad-e Gharbi Rural District Persian: دهستان كلباد غربي
- Rural District
- Location within Iran
- Coordinates: 36°44′N 53°41′E
- Country: Iran
- Province: Mazandaran
- County: Galugah
- District: Kolbad
- Established: 2005
- Capital: Qaleh-ye Payan

Population (2016)
  - Total: 4,447
- Time zone: UTC+3:30 (IRST)

Kolbad-e Gharbi Rural District (Persian: دهستان كلباد غربي) is in Kolbad District of Galugah County, Mazandaran province, Iran. Its capital is the village of Qaleh-ye Payan.

== Demographics ==
=== Population ===
At the time of the 2006 National Census, the rural district's population was 4,805 in 1,204 households. There were 4,727 inhabitants in 1,336 households at the following census of 2011. The 2016 census measured the population of the rural district as 4,447 in 1,401 households. The most populous of its 12 villages was Mehdi Rajeh, with 1,954 people.

The rural district consisted of four populated villages, four livestock estates, a farming and livestock company, and a cooperative fishing company.

=== Other villages in the rural district ===
- Sangyab Sar
- Valamazu
