= Tork Mahalleh, Kargan Rud =

Tork Mahalleh ترك محله
- Village
- Location within Iran
- Coordinates: 38°02′17″N 48°54′24″E
- Country: Iran
- Province: Gilan
- County: Talesh
- Bakhsh: Kargan Rud
- Rural District: Khotbeh Sara

Population (2006)
  - Total: 380
- Time zone: UTC+3:30 (IRST)
  - Summer (DST): UTC+4:30 (IRDT)

Tork Mahalleh (Persian: ترك محله, also Romanized as Tork Maḩalleh) is a village in Khotbeh Sara Rural District, Kargan Rud District, Talesh County, Gilan Province, Iran. At the 2006 census, its population was 380, in 96 families.
