= Tepeš (surname) =

Tepeš is a Slovenian surname. It may refer to:

- Anja Tepeš (born 1991), Slovenian ski jumper; daughter of Miran Tepeš
- Jurij Tepeš (born 1989), Slovenian ski jumper; son of Miran Tepeš
- Miran Tepeš (born 1961), Slovenian ski jumper and Olympic medalist; father of Anja and Jurij Tepeš

== See also ==
- Țepeș (disambiguation)
