= Hoseynabad-e Khayyat =

Hoseynabad-e Khayyat حسين ابادخياط
- Village
- Location within Iran
- Coordinates: 33°47′22″N 48°16′45″E
- Country: Iran
- Province: Lorestan
- County: Selseleh
- Bakhsh: Firuzabad
- Rural District: Firuzabad

Population (2006)
  - Total: 42
- Time zone: UTC+3:30 (IRST)
  - Summer (DST): UTC+4:30 (IRDT)

Hoseynabad-e Khayyat (Persian: حسين ابادخياط, also Romanized as Ḩoseynābād-e Khayyāṭ; also known as Ḩoseynābād, Ḩoseyn Begī, and Ḩoseyn Beygī) is a village in Firuzabad Rural District, Firuzabad District, Selseleh County, Lorestan Province, Iran. At the 2006 census, its population was 42, in 12 families.
