= Saraj Mahalleh, Amol =

Saraj Mahalleh سراج محله
- Village
- Location within Iran
- Coordinates: 36°32′58″N 52°29′38″E
- Country: Iran
- Province: Mazandaran
- County: Amol
- Bakhsh: Dabudasht
- Rural District: Dabuy-ye Jonubi

Population (2006)
  - Total: 246
- Time zone: UTC+3:30 (IRST)
  - Summer (DST): UTC+4:30 (IRDT)

Saraj Mahalleh (Persian: سراج محله, also Romanized as Sarāj Maḩalleh) is a village in Dabuy-ye Jonubi Rural District, Dabudasht District, Amol County, Mazandaran Province, Iran. At the 2006 census, its population was 246, in 60 families.
