= Emamzadeh Mahmud, Kohgiluyeh and Boyer-Ahmad =

Emamzadeh Mahmud امامزاده محمود
- Village
- Location within Iran
- Coordinates: 30°51′40″N 50°44′04″E
- Country: Iran
- Province: Kohgiluyeh and Boyer-Ahmad
- County: Charam
- Bakhsh: Sarfaryab
- Rural District: Poshteh-ye Zilayi

Population (2006)
  - Total: 37
- Time zone: UTC+3:30 (IRST)
  - Summer (DST): UTC+4:30 (IRDT)

Emamzadeh Mahmud (Persian: امامزاده محمود, also Romanized as Emāmzādeh Maḥmūd) is a village in Poshteh-ye Zilayi Rural District, Sarfaryab District, Charam County, Kohgiluyeh and Boyer-Ahmad Province, Iran. At the 2006 census, its population was 37, in 8 families.
