= Shah Reza, Lorestan =

Shah Reza شاه رضا
- Village
- Location within Iran
- Coordinates: 33°36′25″N 48°36′53″E
- Country: Iran
- Province: Lorestan
- County: Khorramabad
- Bakhsh: Bayravand
- Rural District: Beyranvand-e Jonubi

Population (2006)
  - Total: 11
- Time zone: UTC+03:30 (IRST)
  - Summer (DST): UTC+04:30 (IRDT)

Shah Reza (Persian: شاه رضا, also Romanized as Shāh Rez̤ā; also known as Ḩoseyn Beygī) is a village in Beyranvand-e Jonubi Rural District, Bayravand District, Khorramabad County, Lorestan Province, Iran. At the 2006 census, its population was 11, in 4 families.
