= Andrei Țepeș =

Romanian footballer

Personal information
- Full name: Andrei Florin Țepeș-Bobu
- Date of birth: 23 February 1991 (age 35)
- Place of birth: Gheorgheni, Romania
- Height: 1.74 m (5 ft 9 in)
- Position: Defender

Team information
- Current team: Odorheiu Secuiesc

Youth career
- 2000–2008: Viitorul Gheorgheni
- 2008–2010: Ceahlăul Piatra Neamț

Senior career*
Years	Team	Apps	(Gls)
2010–2015	Ceahlăul Piatra Neamț	40	(0)
2013	→ Botoșani (loan)	10	(0)
2015–2017	Sepsi OSK	14	(0)
2017	FK Csíkszereda	4	(0)
2017–2019	CS Gheorgheni	35	(28)
2020–	Odorheiu Secuiesc	15	(0)

Managerial career
- 2017–2019: CS Gheorgheni
- * Club domestic league appearances and goals as of 30 April 2021

Andrei Florin Țepeș-Bobu (born 23 February 1991) is a Romanian footballer who plays as a defender for AFC Odorheiu Secuiesc.

== Honours ==
CS Gheorgheni

- Liga IV – Harghita County: Winner (1) 2018–19
