= Țepeș Vodă =

Țepeș Vodă may refer to several villages in Romania:

- Țepeș Vodă, a village in Movila Miresii Commune, Brăila County
- Țepeș Vodă, a village in Siliștea Commune, Constanța County
