= Vlad Țepeș (disambiguation) =

Vlad Țepeș or Vlad the Impaler (1428/31 – 1476/77) was voivode (or prince) of Wallachia three times between 1448 and his death.

Vlad Țepeș may also refer to:

- Vlad Tepes (band), a French black metal band
- Vlad Țepeș (film), a 1979 Romanian film
- Vlad Țepeș, Călărași, a commune
- Vlad Țepeș, Giurgiu, a village
- Vlad Țepeș League, a political party in interwar Romania
- 528th Reconnaissance Battalion "Vlad Țepeș", an element of the 2nd Infantry Division of the Romanian Land Forces

== See also ==
- Dracula vlad-tepes, a species of Dracula orchid
