= Tappeh, Markazi =

Village in Markazi, Iran

Tappeh تپه
- Village
- Location within Iran
- Coordinates: 33°46′39″N 49°06′03″E
- Country: Iran
- Province: Markazi
- County: Shazand
- Bakhsh: Sarband
- Rural District: Malmir

Population (2006)
  - Total: 18
- Time zone: UTC+3:30 (IRST)
  - Summer (DST): UTC+4:30 (IRDT)

Tappeh (Persian: تپه; also known as Qareh Tappeh, Qūch‘alī Tappeh, Tappeh-ye Khalaj, and Tepe) is a village in Malmir Rural District, Sarband District, Shazand County, Markazi Province, Iran. At the 2006 census, its population was 18, in 6 families.
