= Galugah =

City in Mazandaran province, Iran

Galugah Persian: گلوگاه
- City
- Location within Iran
- Coordinates: 36°43′37″N 53°48′32″E
- Country: Iran
- Province: Mazandaran
- County: Galugah
- District: Central

Population (2016)
  - Total: 21,352
- Time zone: UTC+3:30 (IRST)

Galugah (Persian: گلوگاه) (Note: Also romanized as Galūgāh) is a city in the Central District of Galugah County, Mazandaran province, Iran, serving as capital of both the county and the district. Galugah is on the northern slopes of the Alborz mountain chain, and because it is close to the Caspian Sea from the other side, its atmosphere is mainly humid and damp.

== Demographics ==
=== Language ===
The people of Galugah speak Mazandarani and Azerbaijani languages.

=== Population ===
At the time of the 2006 National Census, the city's population was 18,720 in 4,927 households. The following census in 2011 counted 19,625 people in 5,719 households. The 2016 census measured the population of the city as 21,352 people in 6,898 households.
