= Kolbad District =

District in Mazandaran province, Iran

Kolbad District Persian: بخش کلباد
- District
- Location within Iran
- Coordinates: 36°43′N 53°42′E
- Country: Iran
- Province: Mazandaran
- County: Galugah
- Established: 2005
- Capital: Lemrask

Population (2016)
  - Total: 11,856
- Time zone: UTC+3:30 (IRST)

Kolbad District (Persian: بخش کلباد) is in Galugah County, Mazandaran province, Iran. Its capital is the village of Lemrask.

== Demographics ==
=== Population ===
At the time of the 2006 National Census, the district's population was 12,756 in 3,339 households. The following census in 2011 counted 12,566 people in 3,680 households. The 2016 census measured the population of the district as 11,856 inhabitants in 3,895 households.

=== Administrative divisions ===
Kolbad District Population
Administrative Divisions	2006	2011	2016
Kolbad-e Gharbi RD	4,805	4,727	4,447
Kolbad-e Sharqi RD (Note: Formerly Kolbad Rural District)	7,951	7,839	7,409
Total	12,756	12,566	11,856
RD = Rural District
