= Chapakrud-e Sharqi Rural District =

Rural district in Mazandaran province, Iran

Chapakrud-e Sharqi Rural District Persian: دهستان چپکرود شرقی
- Rural District
- Location within Iran
- Coordinates: 36°43′N 52°53′E
- Country: Iran
- Province: Mazandaran
- County: Juybar
- District: Gil Khuran
- Capital: Kord Kola
- Time zone: UTC+3:30 (IRST)

Chapakrud-e Sharqi Rural District (Persian: دهستان چپکرود شرقی) (Note: Formerly Gil Khuran Rural District (دهستان گیل‌خوران) and Chapakrud Rural District (دهستان چپکرود)) is in Gil Khuran District of Juybar County, Mazandaran province, Iran. Its capital is the village of Kord Kola. The previous capital of the rural district was the village of Kuhi Kheyl.

== Demographics ==
=== Population ===
At the time of the 2006 National Census, the rural district's population (as Chapakrud Rural District) was 9,465 in 2,334 households. There were 9,697 inhabitants in 2,769 households at the following census of 2011. The 2016 census measured the population of the rural district as 9,968 in 3,191 households. The most populous of its 18 villages was Kord Kola, with 1,792 people.

The rural district was renamed Chapakrud-e Sharqi Rural District in 2023.

=== Other villages in the rural district ===
- Ali Kola
- Bikar Ayesh
- Charkh Kati
- Gol Mahalleh
- Mian Malek
- Petrud
- Talnar
