= Siyahrud Rural District (Juybar County) =

Rural district in Mazandaran province, Iran

Siyahrud Rural District Persian: دهستان سياهرود
- Rural District
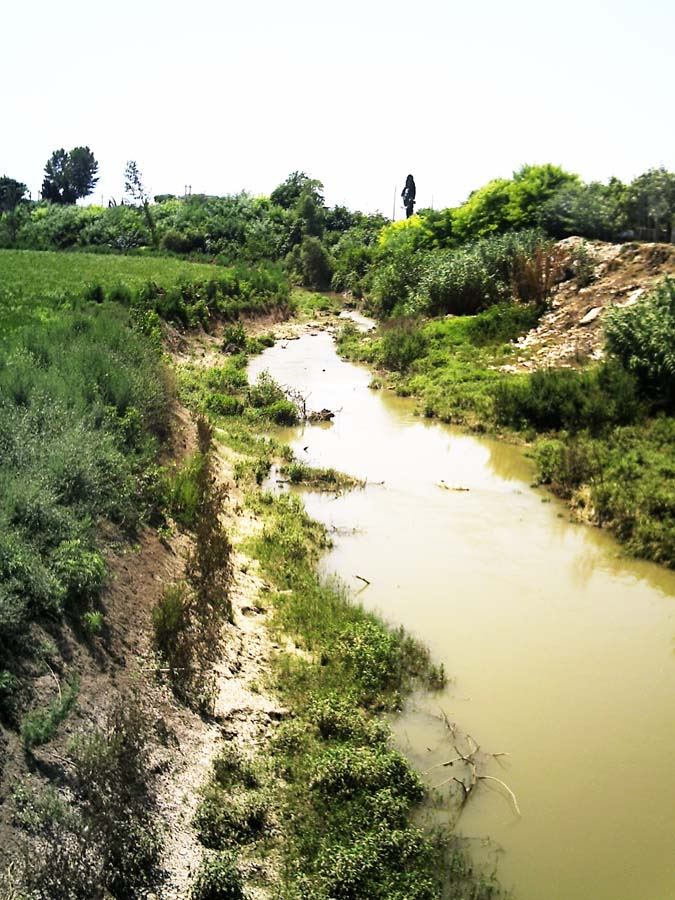
- Siyahrud River

- Location within Iran
- Coordinates: 36°39′N 52°57′E
- Country: Iran
- Province: Mazandaran
- County: Juybar
- District: Central
- Established: 1987
- Capital: Gelyard

Population (2016)
  - Total: 13,714
- Time zone: UTC+3:30 (IRST)

Siyahrud Rural District (Persian: دهستان سياهرود) is in the Central District of Juybar County, Mazandaran province, Iran. Its capital is the village of Gelyard.

== Demographics ==
=== Population ===
At the time of the 2006 National Census, the rural district's population was 13,920 in 3,695 households. There were 14,719 inhabitants in 4,428 households at the following census of 2011. The 2016 census measured the population of the rural district as 13,714 in 4,501 households. The most populous of its 22 villages was Shurka, with 2,330 people.

=== Other villages in the rural district ===
- Astaneh Sar
- Azad Bon
- Darka Sar
- Pahnab Mahalleh
- Saraj Mahalleh
- Talesh Mahalleh
- Vasu Kola
