= Larim-e Shomali Rural District =

Rural district in Mazandaran province, Iran

Larim-e Shomali Rural District Persian: دهستان لاریم شمالی
- Rural District
- Location within Iran
- Coordinates: 36°44′N 52°57′E
- Country: Iran
- Province: Mazandaran
- County: Juybar
- District: Larim
- Established: 1997
- Capital: Pain Zarrin Kola

Population (2016)
  - Total: 105,447
- Time zone: UTC+3:30 (IRST)

Larim-e Shomali Rural District (Persian: دهستان لاریم شمالی) (Note: Formerly Larim Rural District (دهستان لاریم)) is in Larim District of Juybar County, Mazandaran province, Iran. Its capital is the village of Pain Zarrin Kola. The previous capital of the rural district was the village of Larim.

== Demographics ==
=== Population ===
At the time of the 2006 National Census, the rural district's population (as Larim Rural District of Gil Khuran District) was 9,471 in 2,529 households. There were 9,931 inhabitants in 3,036 households at the following census of 2011. The 2016 census measured the population of the rural district as 10,547 in 3,547 households. The most populous of its 17 villages was Larim, with 5,300 people.

In 2023, the rural district was separated from the district in the formation of Larim District and renamed Larim-e Shomali Rural District.

=== Other villages in the rural district ===
- Emamzadeh Mahmud
- Khor Deh Larim
