= Larim District =

District in Mazandaran province, Iran

Larim District Persian: بخش لاریم
- District
- Location within Iran
- Coordinates: 36°44′N 52°58′E
- Country: Iran
- Province: Mazandaran
- County: Juybar
- Established: 2023
- Capital: Larim
- Time zone: UTC+3:30 (IRST)

Larim District (Persian: بخش لاریم) is in Juybar County, Mazandaran province, Iran. Its capital is the village of Larim, whose population at the time of the 2016 National Census was 5,300 people in 1,797 households.

== History ==
In 2023, Larim Rural District (Note: Renamed Larim-e Shomali Rural District) was separated from Gil Khuran District in the formation of Larim District.

== Demographics ==
=== Administrative divisions ===
Larim District
Administrative Divisions
Larim-e Jonubi RD
Larim-e Shomali RD (Note: Formerly Larim Rural District)
RD = Rural District
