= Central District (Galugah County) =

District in Mazandaran province, Iran

Central District (Galugah County) Persian: بخش مرکزی شهرستان گلوگاه
- District
- Location within Iran
- Coordinates: 36°39′N 53°54′E
- Country: Iran
- Province: Mazandaran
- County: Galugah
- Established: 2005
- Capital: Galugah

Population (2016)
  - Total: 28,222
- Time zone: UTC+3:30 (IRST)

The Central District of Galugah County (Persian: بخش مرکزی شهرستان گلوگاه) is in Mazandaran province, Iran. Its capital is the city of Galugah.

== Demographics ==
=== Population ===
At the time of the 2006 National Census, the district's population was 26,694 in 7,026 households. The following census in 2011 counted 26,281 people in 7,856 households. The 2016 census measured the population of the district as 28,222 inhabitants in 9,252 households.

=== Administrative divisions ===
Central District (Galugah County) Population
| Administrative Divisions | 2006 | 2011 | 2016 |
|---|---|---|---|
| Azadegan RD | 3,044 | 2,869 | 2,569 |
| Tuskacheshmeh RD | 4,930 | 3,787 | 4,301 |
| Galugah (city) | 18,720 | 19,625 | 21,352 |
| Total | 26,694 | 26,281 | 28,222 |
RD = Rural District
