= Galugah County =

County in Mazandaran province, Iran

Galugah County Persian: شهرستان گلوگاه
- County
- Location of Galugah County in Mazandaran province (right, purple)

- Location of Mazandaran province in Iran
- Coordinates: 36°45′N 53°50′E
- Country: Iran
- Province: Mazandaran
- Established: 2005
- Capital: Galugah
- Districts: Central, Kolbad

Population (2016)
  - Total: 40,078
- Time zone: UTC+3:30 (IRST)

Galugah County (Persian: شهرستان گلوگاه) is in Mazandaran province, Iran. Its capital is the city of Galugah.

== Demographics ==
=== Population ===
At the time of the 2006 National Census, the county's population was 39,450 in 10,365 households. The following census in 2011 counted 38,847 people in 11,529 households. The 2016 census measured the population of the county as 40,078 in 13,147 households.

=== Administrative divisions ===
Galugah County's population history and administrative structure over three consecutive censuses are shown in the following table.

Galugah County Population
Administrative Divisions	2006	2011	2016
Central District	26,694	26,281	28,222
Azadegan RD	3,044	2,869	2,569
Tuskacheshmeh RD	4,930	3,787	4,301
Galugah (city)	18,720	19,625	21,352
Kolbad District	12,756	12,566	11,856
Kolbad-e Gharbi RD	4,805	4,727	4,447
Kolbad-e Sharqi RD (Note: Formerly Kolbad Rural District)	7,951	7,839	7,409
Total	39,450	38,847	40,078
RD = Rural District

== See also ==
Media related to Galugah County at Wikimedia Commons
