= Gil Khuran District =

District in Mazandaran province, Iran

Gil Khuran District Persian: بخش گیل‌خوران
- District
- Location within Iran
- Coordinates: 36°42′N 52°53′E
- Country: Iran
- Province: Mazandaran
- County: Juybar
- Established: 1997
- Capital: Kuhi Kheyl

Population (2016)
  - Total: 22,757
- Time zone: UTC+3:30 (IRST)

Gil Khuran District (Persian: بخش گیل‌خوران) is in Juybar County, Mazandaran province, Iran. Its capital is the city of Kuhi Kheyl.

== History ==
In 2023, Chapakrud-e Gharbi Rural District was created in the district, and Larim Rural District (Note: Renamed Larim-e Shomali Rural District) was separated from it in the formation of Larim District.

== Demographics ==
=== Population ===
At the time of the 2006 National Census, the district's population was 20,875 in 5,362 households. The following census in 2011 counted 21,689 people in 6,413 households. The 2016 census measured the population of the district as 22,757 inhabitants in 7,474 households.

=== Administrative divisions ===
Gil Khuran District Population
Administrative Divisions	2006	2011	2016
Chapakrud-e Gharbi RD (Note: Established after the 2016 census)			
Chapakrud-e Sharqi Rural District (Note: Formerly Gil Khuran Rural District and Chapakrud Rural District)	9,465	9,697	9,968
Larim RD (Note: Transferred to Larim District after the 2016 census and renamed Larim-e Shomali Rural District)	9,471	9,931	10,547
Kuhi Kheyl (city)	1,939	2,061	2,242
Total	20,875	21,689	22,757
RD = Rural District
