= Central District (Juybar County) =

District in Mazandaran province, Iran

Central District (Juybar County) Persian: بخش مرکزی شهرستان جویبار
- District
- Location within Iran
- Coordinates: 36°38′N 52°55′E
- Country: Iran
- Province: Mazandaran
- County: Juybar
- Established: 1997
- Capital: Juybar

Population (2016)
  - Total: 54,819
- Time zone: UTC+3:30 (IRST)

The Central District of Juybar County (Persian: بخش مرکزی شهرستان جویبار) is in Mazandaran province, Iran. Its capital is the city of Juybar.

== Demographics ==
=== Population ===
At the time of the 2006 National Census, the district's population was 49,329 in 12,914 households. The following census in 2011 counted 51,865 people in 15,290 households. The 2016 census measured the population of the district as 54,819 inhabitants in 17,804 households.

=== Administrative divisions ===
Central District (Juybar County) Population
| Administrative Divisions | 2006 | 2011 | 2016 |
|---|---|---|---|
| Hasan Reza RD | 8,292 | 8,024 | 8,181 |
| Siyahrud RD | 13,920 | 14,719 | 13,714 |
| Juybar (city) | 27,117 | 29,122 | 32,924 |
| Total | 49,329 | 51,865 | 54,819 |
RD = Rural District
