= Juybar County =

County in Mazandaran province, Iran

Juybar County Persian: شهرستان جویبار
- County
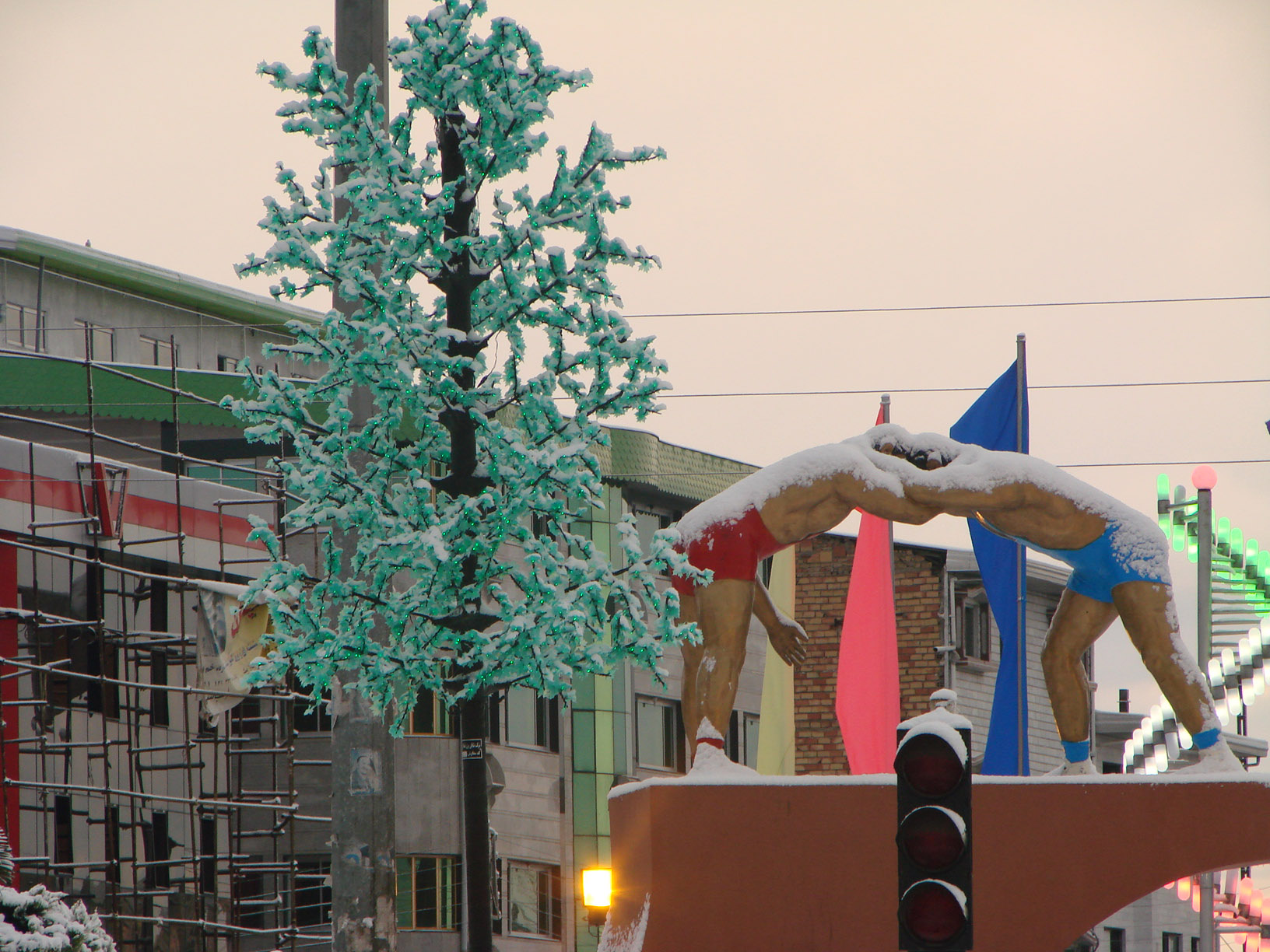
- Wrestling Square in the city of Juybar

- Location of Juybar County in Mazandaran province (top right center, yellow)

- Location of Mazandaran province in Iran
- Coordinates: 36°40′N 52°53′E
- Country: Iran
- Province: Mazandaran
- Established: 1997
- Capital: Juybar
- Districts: Central, Gil Khuran, Larim

Area
  - Total: 285.50 km^{2} (110.23 sq mi)

Population (2016)
  - Total: 77,576
  - Density: 271.72/km^{2} (703.75/sq mi)
- Time zone: UTC+3:30 (IRST)

Juybar County (Persian: شهرستان جویبار) is in Mazandaran province, Iran. Its capital is the city of Juybar.

== History ==
In 1997, Juybar District was separated from Qaem Shahr County in the establishment of Juybar County. In 2023, Chapakrud-e Gharbi Rural District was created in Gil Khuran District. Larim Rural District (Note: Renamed Larim-e Shomali Rural District) was separated from the district in the formation of Larim District, which was divided into two rural districts, including the new Larim-e Jonubi Rural District.

== Demographics ==
=== Population ===
At the time of the 2006 National Census, the county's population was 70,204 in 18,276 households. The following census in 2011 counted 73,554 people in 21,697 households. The 2016 census measured the population of the county as 77,576 in 25,278 households.

=== Administrative divisions ===
Juybar County's population history and administrative structure over three consecutive censuses are shown in the following table.

Juybar County Population
| Administrative Divisions | 2006 | 2011 | 2016 |
|---|---|---|---|
| Central District | 49,329 | 51,865 | 54,819 |
| Hasan Reza RD | 8,292 | 8,024 | 8,181 |
| Siyahrud RD | 13,920 | 14,719 | 13,714 |
| Juybar (city) | 27,117 | 29,122 | 32,924 |
| Gil Khuran District | 20,875 | 21,689 | 22,757 |
| Chapakrud-e Gharbi RD (Note: Established after the 2016 census) | | | |
| Chapakrud-e Sharqi Rural District (Note: Formerly Gil Khuran Rural District and Chapakrud Rural District) | 9,465 | 9,697 | 9,968 |
| Larim RD (Note: Transferred to Larim District after the 2016 census and renamed Larim-e Shomali Rural District) | 9,471 | 9,931 | 10,547 |
| Kuhi Kheyl (city) | 1,939 | 2,061 | 2,242 |
| Larim District | | | |
| Larim-e Jonubi RD | | | |
| Larim-e Shomali RD (Note: Formerly Larim Rural District) | | | |
| Total | 70,204 | 73,554 | 77,576 |
RD = Rural District

== Sport ==
Despite its small population, Juybar County is the most prolific in national champions in wrestling, the national sport of Iran.

== See also ==
Media related to Juybar County at Wikimedia Commons
