= Tervijan =

Tervijan ترويجان
- Village
- Location within Iran
- Coordinates: 36°34′19″N 52°26′24″E
- Country: Iran
- Province: Mazandaran
- County: Amol
- Bakhsh: Dabudasht
- Rural District: Dabuy-ye Jonubi

Population (2006)
  - Total: 473
- Time zone: UTC+3:30 (IRST)
  - Summer (DST): UTC+4:30 (IRDT)

Tervijan (Persian: ترويجان, also Romanized as Tervījān; also known as Tīrbījān) is a village in Dabuy-ye Jonubi Rural District, Dabudasht District, Amol County, Mazandaran Province, Iran. At the 2006 census, its population was 473, in 125 families.
