= Abu Mahalleh =

Abu Mahalleh ابومحله
- Village
- Location within Iran
- Coordinates: 36°35′30″N 52°30′13″E
- Country: Iran
- Province: Mazandaran
- County: Amol
- Bakhsh: Dabudasht
- Rural District: Dabuy-ye Jonubi

Population (2006)
  - Total: 230
- Time zone: UTC+3:30 (IRST)
  - Summer (DST): UTC+4:30 (IRDT)

Abu Mahalleh (Persian: ابومحله, also Romanized as Abū Maḩalleh) is a village in Dabuy-ye Jonubi Rural District, Dabudasht District, Amol County, Mazandaran Province, Iran. At the 2006 census, its population was 230, in 59 families.
