= Jali Kola =

Jali Kola جاليكلا
- Village
- Location within Iran
- Coordinates: 36°34′00″N 52°31′26″E
- Country: Iran
- Province: Mazandaran
- County: Amol
- Bakhsh: Dabudasht
- Rural District: Dabuy-ye Jonubi

Population (2006)
  - Total: 311
- Time zone: UTC+3:30 (IRST)
  - Summer (DST): UTC+4:30 (IRDT)

Jali Kola (Persian: جاليكلا, also Romanized as Jālī Kolā; also known as Jārī Kolā) is a village in Dabuy-ye Jonubi Rural District, Dabudasht District, Amol County, Mazandaran Province, Iran. At the 2006 census, its population was 311, in 81 families.
