= Muzi Koti-ye Olya =

Muzi Koti-ye Olya موزي كتي عليا
- Village
- Location within Iran
- Coordinates: 36°32′46″N 52°30′43″E
- Country: Iran
- Province: Mazandaran
- County: Amol
- Bakhsh: Dabudasht
- Rural District: Dabuy-ye Jonubi

Population (2006)
  - Total: 149
- Time zone: UTC+3:30 (IRST)
  - Summer (DST): UTC+4:30 (IRDT)

Muzi Koti-ye Olya (Persian: موزي كتي عليا, also Romanized as Mūzī Kotī-ye ‘Olyā; also known as Mūzī Gotī-ye Bālā and Mūzīkūtī-ye Bālā) is a village in Dabuy-ye Jonubi Rural District, Dabudasht District, Amol County, Mazandaran Province, Iran. At the 2006 census, its population was 149, in 37 families.
