= Muzi Koti-ye Sofla =

Muzi Koti-ye Sofla موزي كتي سفلي
- Village
- Location within Iran
- Coordinates: 36°33′04″N 52°30′53″E
- Country: Iran
- Province: Mazandaran
- County: Amol
- Bakhsh: Dabudasht
- Rural District: Dabuy-ye Jonubi

Population (2006)
  - Total: 238
- Time zone: UTC+3:30 (IRST)
  - Summer (DST): UTC+4:30 (IRDT)

Muzi Koti-ye Sofla (Persian: موزي كتي سفلي, also Romanized as Mūzī Kotī-ye Soflá; also known as Mūzī Gotī-ye Pā’īn and Mūzīkūtī-ye Pā’īn) is a village in Dabuy-ye Jonubi Rural District, Dabudasht District, Amol County, Mazandaran Province, Iran. At the 2006 census, its population was 238, in 64 families.
