= Barik Mahalleh =

Barik Mahalleh باريك محله
- Village
- Location within Iran
- Coordinates: 36°34′16″N 52°26′58″E
- Country: Iran
- Province: Mazandaran
- County: Amol
- Bakhsh: Dabudasht
- Rural District: Dabuy-ye Jonubi

Population (2006)
  - Total: 357
- Time zone: UTC+3:30 (IRST)
  - Summer (DST): UTC+4:30 (IRDT)

Barik Mahalleh (Persian: باريك محله, also Romanized as Bārīk Maḩalleh) is a village in Dabuy-ye Jonubi Rural District, Dabudasht District, Amol County, Mazandaran Province, Iran. At the 2006 census, its population was 357, in 97 families.
