= Korsi Kola =

Korsi Kola كرسي كلا
- Village
- Location within Iran
- Coordinates: 36°32′59″N 52°28′42″E
- Country: Iran
- Province: Mazandaran
- County: Amol
- Bakhsh: Dabudasht
- Rural District: Dabuy-ye Jonubi

Population (2006)
  - Total: 590
- Time zone: UTC+3:30 (IRST)
  - Summer (DST): UTC+4:30 (IRDT)

Korsi Kola (Persian: كرسي كلا, also Romanized as Korsī Kolā; also known as Korsī Kolā-ye Bālā) is a village in Dabuy-ye Jonubi Rural District, Dabudasht District, Amol County, Mazandaran Province, Iran. At the 2006 census, its population was 590, in 143 families.
