= Yusefabad, Amol =

Yusefabad يوسف آباد
- Village
- Location within Iran
- Coordinates: 36°32′26″N 52°26′12″E
- Country: Iran
- Province: Mazandaran
- County: Amol
- Bakhsh: Dabudasht
- Rural District: Dabuy-ye Jonubi

Population (2016)
  - Total: 201
- Time zone: UTC+3:30 (IRST)

Yusefabad (Persian: يوسف اباد, also Romanized as Yūsefābād) is a village in Dabuy-ye Jonubi Rural District, Dabudasht District, Amol County, Mazandaran Province, Iran.

At the time of the 2006 National Census, the village's population was 201 in 56 households. The following census in 2011 counted 187 people in 56 households. The 2016 census measured the population of the village as 201 people in 68 households.
