= Bur Mahalleh =

Bur Mahalleh بورمحله
- Village
- Location within Iran
- Coordinates: 36°30′13″N 52°24′21″E
- Country: Iran
- Province: Mazandaran
- County: Amol
- Bakhsh: Dabudasht
- Rural District: Dabuy-ye Jonubi

Population (2016)
  - Total: 255
- Time zone: UTC+3:30 (IRST)

Bur Mahalleh (Persian: بورمحله, also Romanized as Būr Maḩalleh) is a village in Dabuy-ye Jonubi Rural District, Dabudasht District, Amol County, Mazandaran Province, Iran.

At the time of the 2006 National Census, the village's population was 186 in 48 households. The following census in 2011 counted 202 people in 55households. The 2016 census measured the population of the village as 255 people in 81 households.
