= Espiyari =

Espiyari اسپياری
- Village
- Location within Iran
- Coordinates: 36°32′35″N 52°27′35″E
- Country: Iran
- Province: Mazandaran
- County: Amol
- Bakhsh: Dabudasht
- Rural District: Dabuy-ye Jonubi

Population (2016)
  - Total: 308
- Time zone: UTC+3:30 (IRST)

Espiyari (Persian: اسپياری, also Romanized as Espīyārī) is a village in Dabuy-ye Jonubi Rural District, Dabudasht District, Amol County, Mazandaran Province, Iran.

At the time of the 2006 National Census, the village's population was 329 in 79 households. The following census in 2011 counted 281 people in 80 households. The 2016 census measured the population of the village as 308 people in 110 households.
