= Dangepia =

Dangepia دنگپيا
- Village
- Location within Iran
- Coordinates: 36°30′51″N 52°28′45″E
- Country: Iran
- Province: Mazandaran
- County: Amol
- Bakhsh: Dabudasht
- Rural District: Dabuy-ye Jonubi

Population (2016)
  - Total: 455
- Time zone: UTC+3:30 (IRST)

Dangepia (Persian: دنگپيا, also Romanized as Dangepīā) is a village in Dabuy-ye Jonubi Rural District, Dabudasht District, Amol County, Mazandaran Province, Iran.

At the time of the 2006 National Census, the village's population was 617 in 157 households. The following census in 2011 counted 563 people in 175 households. The 2016 census measured the population of the village as 455 people in 159 households.
