= Mahut Kola =

Mahut Kola ماهوت كلا
- Village
- Location within Iran
- Coordinates: 36°32′07″N 52°26′38″E
- Country: Iran
- Province: Mazandaran
- County: Amol
- Bakhsh: Dabudasht
- Rural District: Dabuy-ye Jonubi

Population (2016)
  - Total: 183
- Time zone: UTC+3:30 (IRST)

Mahut Kola (Persian: ماهوت كلا, also Romanized as Māhūt Kolā; also known as Māhūk Kolā) is a village in Dabuy-ye Jonubi Rural District, Dabudasht District, Amol County, Mazandaran Province, Iran.

At the time of the 2006 National Census, the village's population was 211. The following census in 2011 counted 204 people in 62 households. The 2016 census measured the population of the village as 183 people in 60 households.
