= Qala Keti =

Qala Keti قلاكتی
- Village
- Location within Iran
- Coordinates: 36°31′17″N 52°28′21″E
- Country: Iran
- Province: Mazandaran
- County: Amol
- Bakhsh: Dabudasht
- Rural District: Dabuy-ye Jonubi

Population (2016)
  - Total: 71
- Time zone: UTC+3:30 (IRST)

Qala Keti (Persian: قلاكتی, also Romanized as Qalā Keti) is a village in Dabuy-ye Jonubi Rural District, Dabudasht District, Amol County, Mazandaran Province, Iran.

At the time of the 2006 National Census, the village's population was 78 in 16 households. The following census in 2011 counted 63 people in 19 households. The 2016 census measured the population of the village as 71 people in 24 households.
