= Hajjiabad, Amol =

Hajjiabad حاجی آباد
- Village
- Location within Iran
- Coordinates: 36°30′17″N 52°27′31″E
- Country: Iran
- Province: Mazandaran
- County: Amol
- Bakhsh: Dabudasht
- Rural District: Dabuy-ye Jonubi

Population (2016)
  - Total: 282
- Time zone: UTC+3:30 (IRST)

Hajjiabad (Persian: حاجی آباد, also Romanized as Ḩājjīābād) is a village in Dabuy-ye Jonubi Rural District, Dabudasht District, Amol County, Mazandaran Province, Iran.

At the time of the 2006 National Census, the village's population was 327 in 78 households. The following census in 2011 counted 297 people in 80 households. The 2016 census measured the population of the village as 282 people in 97 households.
