= Galesh Kola, Amol =

Village in Mazandaran province, Iran

Galesh Kola Persian: گالش كلا
- Village
- Location within Iran
- Coordinates: 36°29′32″N 52°23′34″E
- Country: Iran
- Province: Mazandaran
- County: Amol
- District: Dabudasht
- Rural District: Dabuy-ye Jonubi

Population (2016)
  - Total: 528
- Time zone: UTC+3:30 (IRST)

Galesh Kola (Persian: گالش كلا) (Note: Also romanized as Gālesh Kolā) is a village in Dabuy-ye Jonubi Rural District of Dabudasht District in Amol County, Mazandaran province, Iran.

== Demographics ==
=== Population ===
At the time of the 2006 National Census, the village's population was 447 in 118 households. The following census in 2011 counted 438 people in 140 households. The 2016 census measured the population of the village as 528 people in 176 households.
