= Bamer Kola =

Bamer Kola بامركلا
- Village
- Location within Iran
- Coordinates: 36°31′58″N 52°29′20″E
- Country: Iran
- Province: Mazandaran
- County: Amol
- Bakhsh: Dabudasht
- Rural District: Dabuy-ye Jonubi

Population (2016)
  - Total: 348
- Time zone: UTC+3:30 (IRST)

Bamer Kola (Persian: بامركلا, also Romanized as Bāmer Kolā) is a village in Dabuy-ye Jonubi Rural District, Dabudasht District, Amol County, Mazandaran Province, Iran.

At the time of the 2006 National Census, the village's population was 366 in 91 households. The following census in 2011 counted 360 people in 106 households. The 2016 census measured the population of the village as 348 people in 112 households.
