= Shanehband =

Shanehband شانه بند
- Village
- Location within Iran
- Coordinates: 36°32′04″N 52°28′10″E
- Country: Iran
- Province: Mazandaran
- County: Amol
- Bakhsh: Dabudasht
- Rural District: Dabuy-ye Jonubi

Population (2016)
  - Total: 383
- Time zone: UTC+3:30 (IRST)

Shanehband (Persian: شانه بند, also Romanized as Shānehband) is a village in Dabuy-ye Jonubi Rural District, Dabudasht District, Amol County, Mazandaran Province, Iran.

At the time of the 2006 National Census, the village's population was 370 in 93 households. The following census in 2011 counted 352 people in 107 households. The 2016 census measured the population of the village as 383 people in 139 households.
