= Banesar Kola =

Village in Mazandaran province, Iran

Banesar Kola Persian: بانصركلا
- Village
- Location within Iran
- Coordinates: 36°32′01″N 52°31′10″E
- Country: Iran
- Province: Mazandaran
- County: Amol
- District: Dabudasht
- Rural District: Dabuy-ye Jonubi

Population (2016)
  - Total: 864
- Time zone: UTC+3:30 (IRST)

Banesar Kola (Persian: بانصركلا) (Note: Also romanized as Bāneşar Kolā) is a village in Dabuy-ye Jonubi Rural District of Dabudasht District in Amol County, Mazandaran province, Iran.

== Demographics ==
=== Population ===
At the time of the 2006 National Census, the village's population was 924 in 228 households. The following census in 2011 counted 926 people in 263 households. The 2016 census measured the population of the village as 864 people in 314 households.
