= Surak, Amol =

Surak سورک
- Village
- Location within Iran
- Coordinates: 36°31′08″N 52°25′23″E
- Country: Iran
- Province: Mazandaran
- County: Amol
- Bakhsh: Dabudasht
- Rural District: Dabuy-ye Jonubi

Population (2016)
  - Total: 289
- Time zone: UTC+3:30 (IRST)

Surak (Persian: سورک, also Romanized as Sūrak) is a village in Dabuy-ye Jonubi Rural District, Dabudasht District, Amol County, Mazandaran Province, Iran.

At the time of the 2006 National Census, the village's population was 318 in 84 households. The following census in 2011 counted 308 people in 91 households. The 2016 census measured the population of the village as 289 people in 104 households.
