= Mian Rud, Dabudasht =

Mian Rud ميانرود
- Village
- Location within Iran
- Coordinates: 36°30′48″N 52°28′17″E
- Country: Iran
- Province: Mazandaran
- County: Amol
- Bakhsh: Dabudasht
- Rural District: Dabuy-ye Jonubi

Population (2016)
  - Total: 171
- Time zone: UTC+3:30 (IRST)

Mian Rud (Persian: ميانرود, also Romanized as Mīān Rūd) is a village in Dabuy-ye Jonubi Rural District, Dabudasht District, Amol County, Mazandaran Province, Iran.

At the time of the 2006 National Census, the village's population was 161 in 36 households. The following census in 2011 counted 174 people in 52 households. The 2016 census measured the population of the village as 171 people in 57 households.
