= Soltanabad, Mazandaran =

Soltanabad سلطان آباد
- Village
- Location within Iran
- Coordinates: 36°31′33″N 52°30′00″E
- Country: Iran
- Province: Mazandaran
- County: Amol
- Bakhsh: Dabudasht
- Rural District: Dabuy-ye Jonubi

Population (2016)
  - Total: 66
- Time zone: UTC+3:30 (IRST)

Soltanabad (Persian: سلطان آباد, also Romanized as Solţānābād) is a village in Dabuy-ye Jonubi Rural District, Dabudasht District, Amol County, Mazandaran Province, Iran.

At the time of the 2006 National Census, the village's population was 73 in 17 households. The following census in 2011 counted 67 people in 20 households. The 2016 census measured the population of the village as 66 people in 25 households.
