= Hashtal =

Hashtal (Persian: هشتل) may refer to:

- Bala Hashtal
- Pain Hashtal
