= Shariatabad, Amol =

Shariatabad شريعت آباد
- Village
- Location within Iran
- Coordinates: 36°30′00″N 52°28′00″E
- Country: Iran
- Province: Mazandaran
- County: Amol
- Bakhsh: Dabudasht
- Rural District: Dabuy-ye Jonubi

Population (2016)
  - Total: 84
- Time zone: UTC+3:30 (IRST)

Shariatabad (Persian: شريعت آباد, also romanized as Sharī‘atābād) is a village in Dabuy-ye Jonubi Rural District, Dabudasht District, Amol County, Mazandaran Province, Iran.

At the time of the 2006 National Census, the village's population was 95 in 19 households. The following census in 2011 counted 97 people in 26 households. The 2016 census measured the population of the village as 84 people in 25 households.
