= Shahr-e Keti =

Shahr-e Keti شهركتی
- Village
- Location within Iran
- Coordinates: 36°31′09″N 52°29′27″E
- Country: Iran
- Province: Mazandaran
- County: Amol
- Bakhsh: Dabudasht
- Rural District: Dabuy-ye Jonubi

Population (2016)
  - Total: 72
- Time zone: UTC+3:30 (IRST)

Shahr-e Keti (Persian: شهركتی, also Romanized as Shahr-e Ketī) is a village in Dabuy-ye Jonubi Rural District, Dabudasht District, Amol County, Mazandaran Province, Iran.

At the time of the 2006 National Census, the village's population was 93 in 24 households. The following census in 2011 counted 79 people in 22 households. The 2016 census measured the population of the village as 72 people in 24 households.
