= Chareh, Amol =

Chareh چاره
- Village
- Location within Iran
- Coordinates: 36°28′49″N 52°26′08″E
- Country: Iran
- Province: Mazandaran
- County: Amol
- Bakhsh: Dabudasht
- Rural District: Dabuy-ye Jonubi

Population (2016)
  - Total: 460
- Time zone: UTC+3:30 (IRST)

Chareh (Persian: چاره, also Romanized as Chāreh) is a village in Dabuy-ye Jonubi Rural District, Dabudasht District, Amol County, Mazandaran Province, Iran.

At the time of the 2006 National Census, the village's population was 448 in 110 households. The following census in 2011 counted 473 people in 130 households. The 2016 census measured the population of the village as 460 people in 148 households.
