= Tanha Kola, Amol =

Tanha Kola تنهاكلا
- Village
- Location within Iran
- Coordinates: 36°31′16″N 52°30′26″E
- Country: Iran
- Province: Mazandaran
- County: Amol
- Bakhsh: Dabudasht
- Rural District: Dabuy-ye Jonubi

Population (2016)
  - Total: 412
- Time zone: UTC+3:30 (IRST)

Tanha Kola (Persian: تنهاكلا, also Romanized as Tanhā Kalā; also known as Tanā Kalā) is a village in Dabuy-ye Jonubi Rural District, Dabudasht District, Amol County, Mazandaran Province, Iran.

At the time of the 2006 National Census, the village's population was 447 in 108 households. The following census in 2011 counted 416 people in 117 households. The 2016 census measured the population of the village as 412 people in 132 households.
