= Alu, Mazandaran =

Alu الو
- Village
- Location within Iran
- Coordinates: 36°30′30″N 52°24′19″E
- Country: Iran
- Province: Mazandaran
- County: Amol
- Bakhsh: Dabudasht
- Rural District: Dabuy-ye Jonubi

Population (2016)
  - Total: 467
- Time zone: UTC+3:30 (IRST)

Alu (Persian: الو, also Romanized as Alū, Allū, and ‘Alū) is a village in Dabuy-ye Jonubi Rural District, Dabudasht District, Amol County, Mazandaran Province, Iran.

At the time of the 2006 National Census, the village's population was 420 in 99 households. The following census in 2011 counted 447 people in 117 households. The 2016 census measured the population of the village as 467 people in 154 households.
