= Aspahi Kola =

Aspahi Kola اسپاهيكلا
- Village
- Location within Iran
- Coordinates: 36°32′31″N 52°28′19″E
- Country: Iran
- Province: Mazandaran
- County: Amol
- Bakhsh: Dabudasht
- Rural District: Dabuy-ye Jonubi

Population (2016)
  - Total: 301
- Time zone: UTC+3:30 (IRST)

Aspahi Kola (Persian: اسپاهيكلا, also Romanized as Aspāhī Kalā; also known as Esbāykalā) is a village in Dabuy-ye Jonubi Rural District, Dabudasht District, Amol County, Mazandaran Province, Iran.

At the time of the 2006 National Census, the village's population was 269 in 71 households. The following census in 2011 counted 299 people in 92 households. The 2016 census measured the population of the village as 301 people in 99 households.
