= Pasha Kola, Dabuy-ye Jonubi =

Village in Mazandaran province, Iran

Pasha Kola Persian: پاشاكلا
- Village
- Location within Iran
- Coordinates: 36°30′58″N 52°27′05″E
- Country: Iran
- Province: Mazandaran
- County: Amol
- District: Dabudasht
- Rural District: Dabuy-ye Jonubi

Population (2016)
  - Total: 607
- Time zone: UTC+3:30 (IRST)

Pasha Kola (Persian: پاشاكلا) (Note: Also romanized as Pāshā Kolā) is a village in Dabuy-ye Jonubi Rural District of Dabudasht District in Amol County, Mazandaran province, Iran.

== Demographics ==
=== Population ===
At the time of the 2006 National Census, the village's population was 600 in 153 households. The following census in 2011 counted 604 people in 174 households. The 2016 census measured the population of the village as 607 people in 193 households.
