= Ashrafabad, Mazandaran =

Ashrafabad اشرف آباد
- Village
- Location within Iran
- Coordinates: 36°30′48″N 52°27′18″E
- Country: Iran
- Province: Mazandaran
- County: Amol
- Bakhsh: Dabudasht
- Rural District: Dabuy-ye Jonubi

Population (2016)
  - Total: 178
- Time zone: UTC+3:30 (IRST)

Ashrafabad (Persian: اشرف آباد, also Romanized as Ashrafābād) is a village in Dabuy-ye Jonubi Rural District, Dabudasht District, Amol County, Mazandaran Province, Iran.

At the time of the 2006 National Census, the village's population was 134 in 36 households. The following census in 2011 counted 150 people in 42 households. The 2016 census measured the population of the village as 178 people in 65 households.
