= Shah Kola =

Shah Kola شاه كلا
- Village
- Location within Iran
- Coordinates: 36°31′34″N 52°26′21″E
- Country: Iran
- Province: Mazandaran
- County: Amol
- Bakhsh: Dabudasht
- Rural District: Dabuy-ye Jonubi

Population (2016)
  - Total: 382
- Time zone: UTC+3:30 (IRST)

Shah Kola (Persian: شاه كلا, also Romanized as Shāh Kalā; also known as Shāh Kolā-ye Sūrak) is a village in Dabuy-ye Jonubi Rural District, Dabudasht District, Amol County, Mazandaran Province, Iran.

At the time of the 2006 National Census, the village's population was 401 in 104 households. The following census in 2011 counted 352 people in 105 households. The 2016 census measured the population of the village as 382 people in 127 households.
