= Mamraz Keti =

Mamraz Keti ممرزکتی
- Village
- Location within Iran
- Coordinates: 36°30′05″N 52°28′18″E
- Country: Iran
- Province: Mazandaran
- County: Amol
- Bakhsh: Dabudasht
- Rural District: Dabuy-ye Jonubi

Population (2016)
  - Total: 240
- Time zone: UTC+3:30 (IRST)

Mamraz Keti (Persian: ممرزکتی, also Romanized as Mamraz Keti) is a village in Dabuy-ye Jonubi Rural District, Dabudasht District, Amol County, Mazandaran Province, Iran.

At the time of the 2006 National Census, the village's population was 265 in 69 households. The following census in 2011 counted 247 people in 71 households. The 2016 census measured the population of the village as 240 people in 85 households.
