= Naserabad, Amol =

Naserabad ناصرآباد
- Village
- Interactive map of Naserabad
- Coordinates: 36.485°N 52.436°E
- Country: Iran
- Province: Mazandaran
- County: Amol
- Bakhsh: Dabudasht
- Rural District: Dabuy-ye Jonubi

Population (2016)
  - Total: 114
- Time zone: UTC+3:30 (IRST)

Naserabad (Persian: ناصرآباد, also Romanized as Nāṣerābād) is a village in Dabuy-ye Jonubi Rural District, Dabudasht District, Amol County, Mazandaran Province, Iran.

At the time of the 2006 National Census, the village's population was 116 in 23 households. The following census in 2011 counted 105 people in 27 households. The 2016 census measured the population of the village as 114 people in 33 households.
