= Espiarbon =

Village in Mazandaran province, Iran

Espiarbon Persian: اسپياربن
- Village
- Location within Iran
- Coordinates: 36°28′39″N 52°25′22″E
- Country: Iran
- Province: Mazandaran
- County: Amol
- District: Dabudasht
- Rural District: Dabuy-ye Jonubi

Population (2016)
  - Total: 758
- Time zone: UTC+3:30 (IRST)

Espiarbon (Persian: اسپياربن) (Note: Also romanized as Espīārbon; also known as Sefīdārbon) is a village in Dabuy-ye Jonubi Rural District of Dabudasht District in Amol County, Mazandaran province, Iran.

== Demographics ==
=== Population ===
At the time of the 2006 National Census, the village's population was 722 in 169 households. The following census in 2011 counted 748 people in 199 households. The 2016 census measured the population of the village as 758 people in 224 households.
