= Rashkola =

Village in Mazandaran province, Iran

Rashkola Persian: رشكلا
- Village
- Location within Iran
- Coordinates: 36°28′33″N 52°24′31″E
- Country: Iran
- Province: Mazandaran
- County: Amol
- District: Dabudasht
- Rural District: Dabuy-ye Jonubi

Population (2016)
  - Total: 2,669
- Time zone: UTC+3:30 (IRST)

Rashkola (Persian: رشكلا) (Note: Also romanized as Rashkolā and Rashkalā) is a village in Dabuy-ye Jonubi Rural District of Dabudasht District in Amol County, Mazandaran province, Iran.

== Demographics ==
=== Population ===
At the time of the 2006 National Census, the village's population was 2,505 in 655 households. The following census in 2011 counted 2,696 people in 802 households. The 2016 census measured the population of the village as 2,669 people in 902 households. It was the most populous village in its rural district.
