= Motahhar =

Motahhar (Persian: مطهر), also known as Motahharabad, may refer to:

- Motahhar-e Olya
- Motahhar-e Sofla
