= Palham Koti =

Palham Keti پلهم كتی
- Village
- Location within Iran
- Coordinates: 36°30′28″N 52°29′33″E
- Country: Iran
- Province: Mazandaran
- County: Amol
- Bakhsh: Dabudasht
- Rural District: Dabuy-ye Jonubi

Population (2016)
  - Total: 172
- Time zone: UTC+3:30 (IRST)

Palham Keti (Persian: پلهم كتی, also Romanized as Palham Keti and Palham Kotī) is a village in Dabuy-ye Jonubi Rural District, Dabudasht District, Amol County, Mazandaran Province, Iran.

At the time of the 2006 National Census, the village's population was 167 in 43 households. The following census in 2011 counted 159 people in 48 households. The 2016 census measured the population of the village as 172 people in 60 households.
