= Dau Kola =

Dau Kola دعو كلا
- Village
- Location within Iran
- Coordinates: 36°30′20″N 52°26′54″E
- Country: Iran
- Province: Mazandaran
- County: Amol
- Bakhsh: Dabudasht
- Rural District: Dabuy-ye Jonubi

Population (2016)
  - Total: 275
- Time zone: UTC+3:30 (IRST)

Dau Kola (Persian: دعو كلا, also Romanized as Dā’ū Kolā; also known as Dāvūd Kolā) is a village in Dabuy-ye Jonubi Rural District, Dabudasht District, Amol County, Mazandaran Province, Iran.

At the time of the 2006 National Census, the village's population was 278 in 74 households. The following census in 2011 counted 312 people in 90 households. The 2016 census measured the population of the village as 275 people in 92 households.
