= Deyeh =

Deyeh ديه
- Village
- Location within Iran
- Coordinates: 36°30′12″N 52°29′02″E
- Country: Iran
- Province: Mazandaran
- County: Amol
- Bakhsh: Dabudasht
- Rural District: Dabuy-ye Jonubi

Population (2016)
  - Total: 170
- Time zone: UTC+3:30 (IRST)

Deyeh (Persian: ديه) is a village in Dabuy-ye Jonubi Rural District, Dabudasht District, Amol County, Mazandaran Province, Iran.

At the time of the 2006 National Census, the village's population was 237 in 68 households. The following census in 2011 counted 183 people in 58 households. The 2016 census measured the population of the village as 170 people in 63 households.
