= Raisabad, Mazandaran =

Village in Mazandaran province, Iran

Raisabad Persian: رييس آباد
- Village
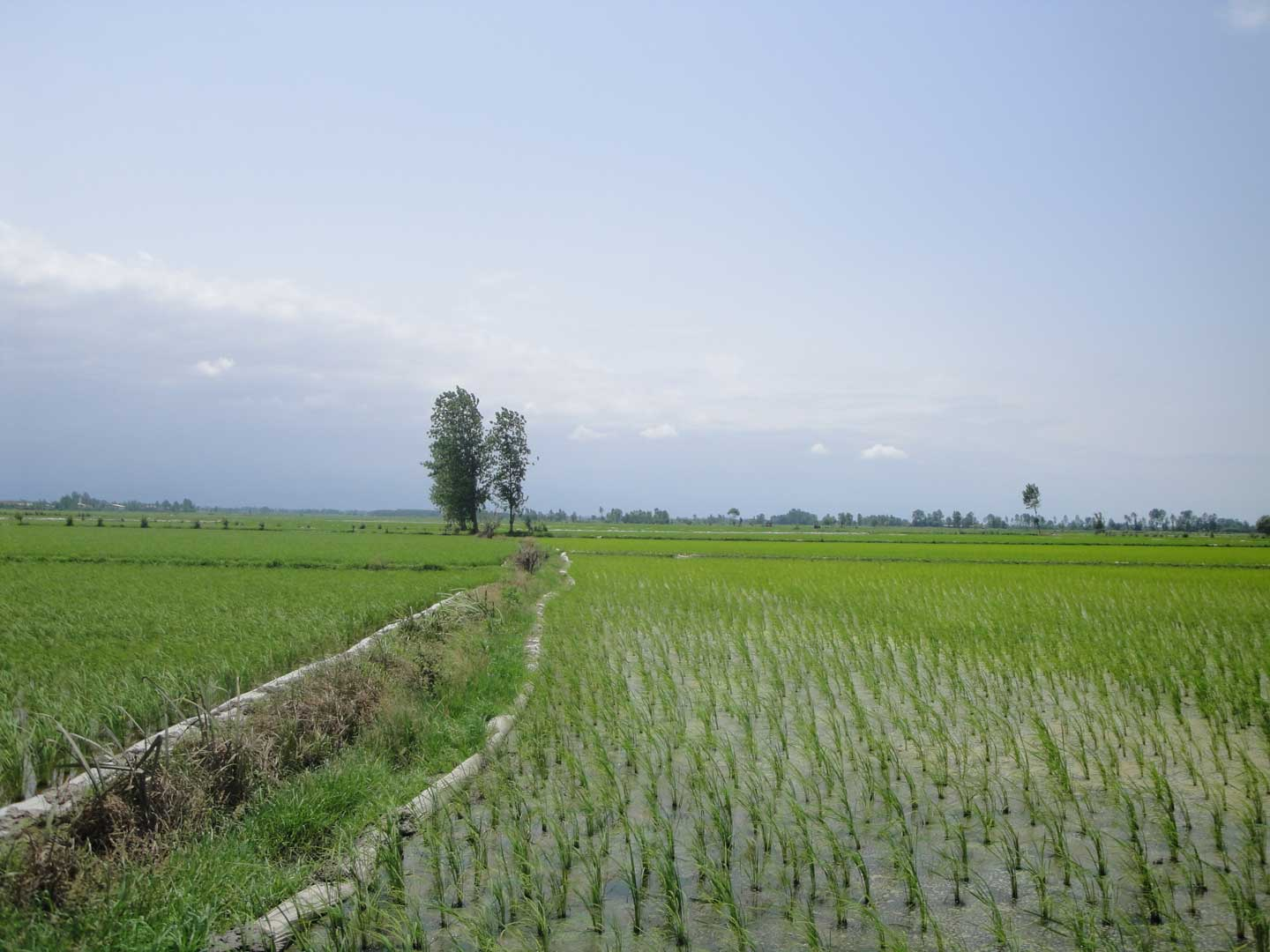
- Rice paddy in Raisabad, Amol

- Location within Iran
- Coordinates: 36°31′40″N 52°28′01″E
- Country: Iran
- Province: Mazandaran
- County: Amol
- District: Dabudasht
- Rural District: Dabuy-ye Jonubi

Population (2016)
  - Total: 374
- Time zone: UTC+3:30 (IRST)

Raisabad (Persian: رييس آباد) (Note: Also romanized as Ra’īsābād) is a village in, and the capital of, Dabuy-ye Jonubi Rural District in Dabudasht District of Amol County, Mazandaran province, Iran.

== Demographics ==
=== Population ===
At the time of the 2006 National Census, the village's population was 326 in 89 households. The following census in 2011 counted 354 people in 106 households. The 2016 census measured the population of the village as 374 people in 129 households.
