= Hasanabad, Amol =

Hasanabad حسن آباد
- Village
- Location within Iran
- Coordinates: 36°29′34″N 52°29′46″E
- Country: Iran
- Province: Mazandaran
- County: Amol
- Bakhsh: Dabudasht
- Rural District: Dabuy-ye Jonubi

Population (2016)
  - Total: 158
- Time zone: UTC+3:30 (IRST)

Hasanabad (Persian: حسن آباد, also Romanized as Ḩasanābād) is a village in Dabuy-ye Jonubi Rural District, Dabudasht District, Amol County, Mazandaran Province, Iran.

It is east of Dabudasht city.

At the time of the 2006 National Census, the village's population was 133 in 45 households. The following census in 2011 counted 122 people in 39 households. The 2016 census measured the population of the village as 158 people in 57 households.
