= Darzi Kola, Amol =

Village in Mazandaran province, Iran

Darzi Kola Persian: درزيكلا
- Village
- Location within Iran
- Coordinates: 36°30′10″N 52°24′40″E
- Country: Iran
- Province: Mazandaran
- County: Amol
- District: Dabudasht
- Rural District: Dabuy-ye Jonubi

Population (2016)
  - Total: 828
- Time zone: UTC+3:30 (IRST)

Darzi Kola (Persian: درزيكلا) (Note: Also romanized as Darzī Kolā) is a village in Dabuy-ye Jonubi Rural District of Dabudasht District in Amol County, Mazandaran province, Iran.

== Demographics ==
=== Population ===
At the time of the 2006 National Census, the village's population was 784 in 183 households. The following census in 2011 counted 829 people in 232 households. The 2016 census measured the population of the village as 828 people in 256 households.
