= Kashi Mahalleh =

Kashi Mahalleh كاشی محله
- Village
- Location within Iran
- Coordinates: 36°29′27″N 52°28′30″E
- Country: Iran
- Province: Mazandaran
- County: Amol
- Bakhsh: Dabudasht
- Rural District: Dabuy-ye Jonubi

Population (2016)
  - Total: 213
- Time zone: UTC+3:30 (IRST)

Kashi Mahalleh (Persian: كاشی محله, also Romanized as Kāshī Maḩalleh) is a village in Dabuy-ye Jonubi Rural District, Dabudasht District, Amol County, Mazandaran Province, Iran.

At the time of the 2006 National Census, the village's population was 216 in 55 households. The following census in 2011 counted 216 people in 67 households. The 2016 census measured the population of the village as 213 people in 73 households.
