= Kalik Sar =

Village in Mazandaran province, Iran

Kalik Sar Persian: کلیک سر
- Village
- Location within Iran
- Coordinates: 36°29′33″N 52°27′07″E
- Country: Iran
- Province: Mazandaran
- County: Amol
- District: Dabudasht
- Rural District: Dabuy-ye Jonubi

Population (2016)
  - Total: 571
- Time zone: UTC+3:30 (IRST)

Kalik Sar (Persian: کلیک سر) (Note: Also romanized as Kalīk Sar) is a village in Dabuy-ye Jonubi Rural District of Dabudasht District in Amol County, Mazandaran province, Iran.

== Demographics ==
=== Population ===
At the time of the 2006 National Census, the village's population was 637 in 161 households. The following census in 2011 counted 618 people in 173 households. The 2016 census measured the population of the village as 571 people in 188 households.
