= Musa Mahalleh =

Musa Mahalleh موسی محله
- Village
- Location within Iran
- Coordinates: 36°29′20″N 52°28′57″E
- Country: Iran
- Province: Mazandaran
- County: Amol
- Bakhsh: Dabudasht
- Rural District: Dabuy-ye Jonubi

Population (2016)
  - Total: 214
- Time zone: UTC+3:30 (IRST)

Musa Mahalleh (Persian: موسی محله, also Romanized as Mūsá Maḩalleh) is a village in Dabuy-ye Jonubi Rural District, Dabudasht District, Amol County, Mazandaran Province, Iran.

At the time of the 2006 National Census, the village's population was 225 in 57 households. The following census in 2011 counted 242 people in 61 households. The 2016 census measured the population of the village as 214 people in 72 households.
