= Tazehabad, Dabudasht =

Tazehabad تازه‌آباد
- Village
- Location within Iran
- Coordinates: 36°31′54″N 52°28′35″E
- Country: Iran
- Province: Mazandaran
- County: Amol
- Bakhsh: Dabudasht
- Rural District: Dabuy-ye Jonubi

Population (2016)
  - Total: 244
- Time zone: UTC+3:30 (IRST)

Tazehabad (Persian: تازه‌آباد, also Romanized as Tāzehābād) is a village in Dabuy-ye Jonubi Rural District, Dabudasht District, Amol County, Mazandaran Province, Iran.

At the time of the 2006 National Census, the village's population was 272 in 75 households. The following census in 2011 counted 268 people in 89 households. The 2016 census measured the population of the village as 244 people in 92 households.
