= Hoseynabad, Dabudasht =

Hoseynabad حسين آباد
- Village
- Location within Iran
- Coordinates: 36°31′12″N 52°28′11″E
- Country: Iran
- Province: Mazandaran
- County: Amol
- Bakhsh: Dabudasht
- Rural District: Dabuy-ye Jonubi

Population (2016)
  - Total: 214
- Time zone: UTC+3:30 (IRST)

Hoseynabad (Persian: حسین آباد, also Romanized as Ḩoseynābād) is a village in Dabuy-ye Jonubi Rural District, Dabudasht District, Amol County, Mazandaran Province, Iran.

At the time of the 2006 National Census, the village's population was 185 in 48 households. The following census in 2011 counted 207 people in 62 households. The 2016 census measured the population of the village as 214 people in 69 households.
