= Naijabad =

Naijabad نائيج آباد
- Village
- Location within Iran
- Coordinates: 36°31′53″N 52°27′05″E
- Country: Iran
- Province: Mazandaran
- County: Amol
- Bakhsh: Dabudasht
- Rural District: Dabuy-ye Jonubi

Population (2016)
  - Total: 219
- Time zone: UTC+3:30 (IRST)

Naijabad (Persian: نائيج آباد, also Romanized as Nā’ījābād) is a village in Dabuy-ye Jonubi Rural District, Dabudasht District, Amol County, Mazandaran Province, Iran.

At the time of the 2006 National Census, the village's population was 262 in 65 households. The following census in 2011 counted 237 people in 67 households. The 2016 census measured the population of the village as 219 people in 87 households.
