= Tuleh Kola =

Village in Mazandaran province, Iran

Tuleh Kola Persian: طوله كلا
- Village
- Location within Iran
- Coordinates: 36°29′21″N 52°24′07″E
- Country: Iran
- Province: Mazandaran
- County: Amol
- District: Dabudasht
- Rural District: Dabuy-ye Jonubi

Population (2016)
  - Total: 990
- Time zone: UTC+3:30 (IRST)

Tuleh Kola (Persian: طوله كلا) (Note: Also romanized as Ţūleh Kolā) is a village in Dabuy-ye Jonubi Rural District of Dabudasht District in Amol County, Mazandaran province, Iran.

== Demographics ==
=== Population ===
At the time of the 2006 National Census, the village's population was 961 in 253 households. The following census in 2011 counted 865 people in 272 households. The 2016 census measured the population of the village as 990 people in 322 households.
