= Narges Marz =

Narges Marz نرگس مرز
- Village
- Location within Iran
- Coordinates: 36°32′02″N 52°30′05″E
- Country: Iran
- Province: Mazandaran
- County: Amol
- Bakhsh: Dabudasht
- Rural District: Dabuy-ye Jonubi

Population (2016)
  - Total: 252
- Time zone: UTC+3:30 (IRST)

Narges Marz (Persian: نرگس مرز; also known as Narges Marzeh and Narges Marzeh-ye Bālā) is a village in Dabuy-ye Jonubi Rural District, Dabudasht District, Amol County, Mazandaran Province, Iran.

At the time of the 2006 National Census, the village's population was 290 in 77 households. The following census in 2011 counted 272 people in 79 households. The 2016 census measured the population of the village as 252 people in 87 households.
