= Motahhar-e Sofla =

Motahhar-e Sofla مطهر سفلی
- Village
- Location within Iran
- Coordinates: 36°30′20″N 52°30′02″E
- Country: Iran
- Province: Mazandaran
- County: Amol
- Bakhsh: Dabudasht
- Rural District: Dabuy-ye Jonubi

Population (2016)
  - Total: 273
- Time zone: UTC+3:30 (IRST)

Motahhar-e Sofla (Persian: مطهر سفلی, also Romanized as Moţahhar-e Soflá; also known as Moţahharābād-e Pā‘īn) is a village in Dabuy-ye Jonubi Rural District, Dabudasht District, Amol County, Mazandaran Province, Iran.

At the time of the 2006 National Census, the village's population was 324 in 91 households. The following census in 2011 counted 283 people in 90 households. The 2016 census measured the population of the village as 273 people in 94 households.
