= Motahhar-e Olya =

Village in Mazandaran province, Iran

Motahhar-e Olya Persian: مطهرعليا
- Village
- Location within Iran
- Coordinates: 36°30′09″N 52°29′58″E
- Country: Iran
- Province: Mazandaran
- County: Amol
- District: Dabudasht
- Rural District: Dabuy-ye Jonubi

Population (2016)
  - Total: 616
- Time zone: UTC+3:30 (IRST)

Motahhar-e Olya (Persian: مطهرعليا) (Note: Also romanized as Moţahhar-e ‘Olyā; also known as Moţahhar-e Bālā) is a village in Dabuy-ye Jonubi Rural District of Dabudasht District in Amol County, Mazandaran province, Iran.

== Demographics ==
=== Population ===
At the time of the 2006 National Census, the village's population was 531 in 150 households. The following census in 2011 counted 634 people in 210 households. The 2016 census measured the population of the village as 616 people in 229 households.
