= Pain Hashtal =

Village in Mazandaran province, Iran

Pain Hashtal Persian: پايين هشتل
- Village
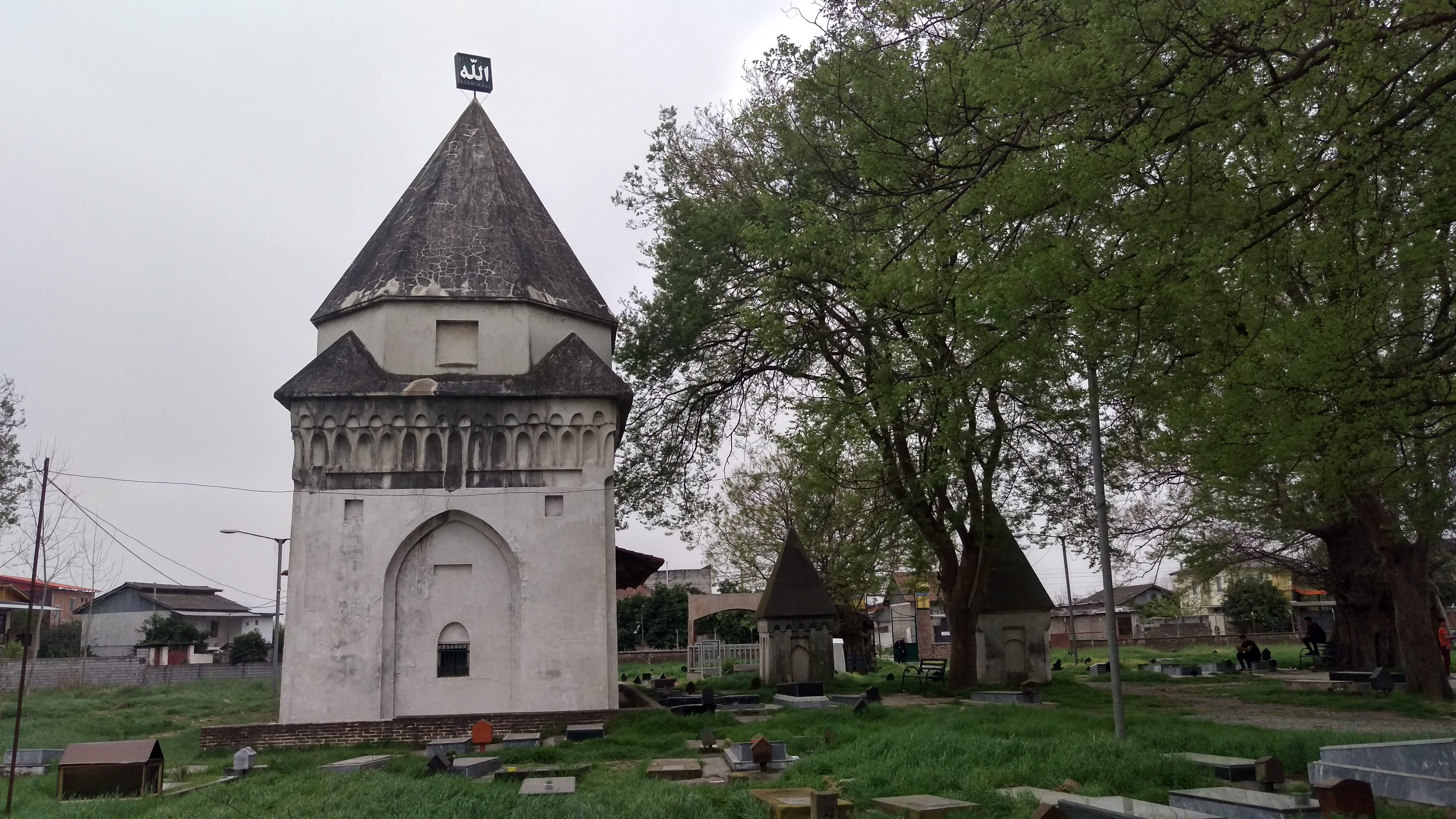
- Emamzadeh Qasem mausoleum in the village of Pain Hashtal

- Location within Iran
- Coordinates: 36°29′51″N 52°25′33″E
- Country: Iran
- Province: Mazandaran
- County: Amol
- District: Dabudasht
- Rural District: Dabuy-ye Jonubi

Population (2016)
  - Total: 870
- Time zone: UTC+3:30 (IRST)

Pain Hashtal (Persian: پايين هشتل) (Note: Also romanized as Pā’īn Hashtal; also known as Hashtal and Hashtal-e Pā’īn) is a village in Dabuy-ye Jonubi Rural District of Dabudasht District in Amol County, Mazandaran province, Iran.

== Demographics ==
=== Population ===
At the time of the 2006 National Census, the village's population was 829 in 209 households. The following census in 2011 counted 1,238 people in 364 households. The 2016 census measured the population of the village as 870 people in 273 households.
