= Bala Hashtal =

Village in Mazandaran province, Iran

Bala Hashtal Persian: بالاهشتل
- Village
- Location within Iran
- Coordinates: 36°29′13″N 52°25′43″E
- Country: Iran
- Province: Mazandaran
- County: Amol
- District: Dabudasht
- Rural District: Dabuy-ye Jonubi

Population (2016)
  - Total: 529
- Time zone: UTC+3:30 (IRST)

Bala Hashtal (Persian: بالاهشتل) (Note: Also romanized as Bālā Hashtal; also known as Hashtal) is a village in Dabuy-ye Jonubi Rural District of Dabudasht District in Amol County, Mazandaran province, Iran.

== Demographics ==
=== Population ===
At the time of the 2006 National Census, the village's population was 472 in 116 households. The following census in 2011 counted 527 people in 146 households. The 2016 census measured the population of the village as 529 people in 179 households.
