= Abdangesar =

Abdangesar or Ab Dang Sar or Abdangsar (Persian: ابدنگسر) may refer to:

- Abdangsar, Gilan
- Abdangesar, Amol, Mazandaran Province
- Ab Dang Sar, Savadkuh, Mazandaran Province
