= Kord Kheyl, Amol =

Kord Kheyl كردخيل
- Village
- Location within Iran
- Coordinates: 36°29′45″N 52°25′48″E
- Country: Iran
- Province: Mazandaran
- County: Amol
- Bakhsh: Dabudasht
- Rural District: Dabuy-ye Jonubi

Population (2016)
  - Total: 391
- Time zone: UTC+3:30 (IRST)

Kord Kheyl (Persian: كردخيل; also known as Kordī Kheyl) is a village in Dabuy-ye Jonubi Rural District, Dabudasht District, Amol County, Mazandaran Province, Iran.

At the time of the 2006 National Census, the village's population was 373 in 95 households. The following census in 2011 counted 423 people in 106 households. The 2016 census measured the population of the village as 391 people in 133 households.
