= Abdangesar, Amol =

Abdangesar آبدنگسر (Persian) اودنگسر (Mazandarani)
- Village
- Location within Iran
- Coordinates: 36°33′00″N 52°28′00″E
- Country: Iran
- Province: Mazandaran
- County: Amol
- Bakhsh: Dabudasht
- Rural District: Dabuy-ye Jonubi

Population (2016)
  - Total: 283
- Time zone: UTC+3:30 (IRST)

Abdangesar (Persian: آبدنگسر, also Romanized as Ābdāngesar), known as Udangesar (Persian: اودنگسر) in Mazanderani language. (Note: Also known as Udangsar, Odangesar, Udangisar) is a village in Dabuy-ye Jonubi Rural District, Dabudasht District, Amol County, Mazandaran Province, Iran.

At the 2016 census, its population was 283, in 104 families. Down from 304 in 2006.
