= Kord Kheyl =

Kord Kheyl or Kord Khil (Persian: كردخيل) may refer to:

- Kord Khil-e Valam, Gilan Province
- Kord Kheyl, Amol, Mazandaran Province
- Kord Kheyl, Juybar, Mazandaran Province
- Kord Kheyl, Ramsar, Mazandaran Province
- Kord Kheyl, Esfivard-e Shurab, Sari County, Mazandaran Province
- Kord Kheyl, Rudpey-ye Shomali, Sari County, Mazandaran Province
