= Moalagh Bridge =

Bridge in Amol, Iran

Moalagh Bridge: پل معلق
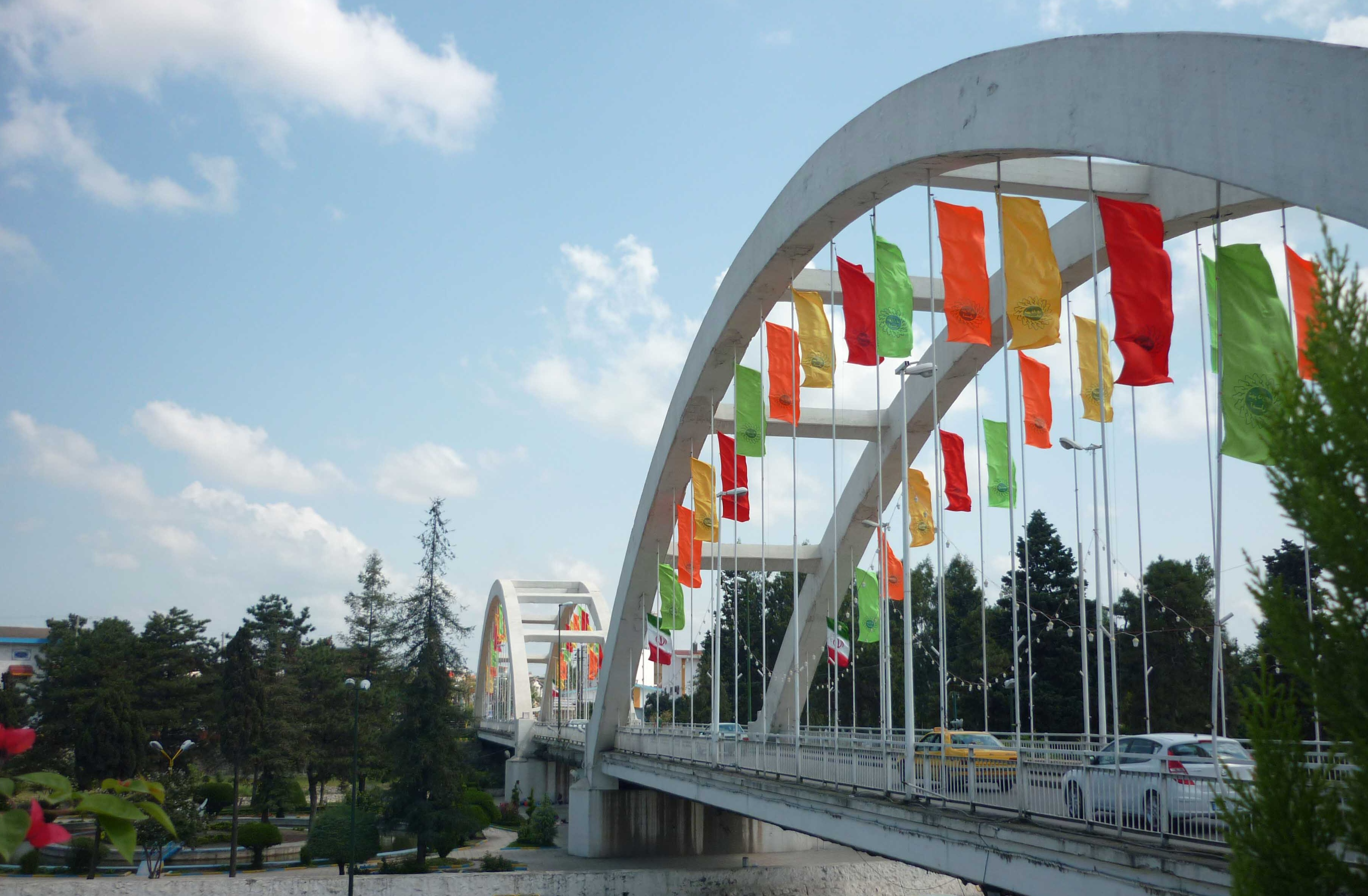
- Coordinates: 36.47046°N 52.35649°E
- Carries: Pedestrian and Automotive traffic
- Crosses: Haraz River
- Locale: Amol
- Official name: Pol-e Moalagh (Moalagh Bridge)
- Other name(s): Amol Suspension Bridge; Noo Bridge; Felezi Bridge

Characteristics
- Material: Concrete

History
- Construction start: July 12, 1958
- Inaugurated: September 7, 1959

Location
- Interactive map of Moalagh Bridge

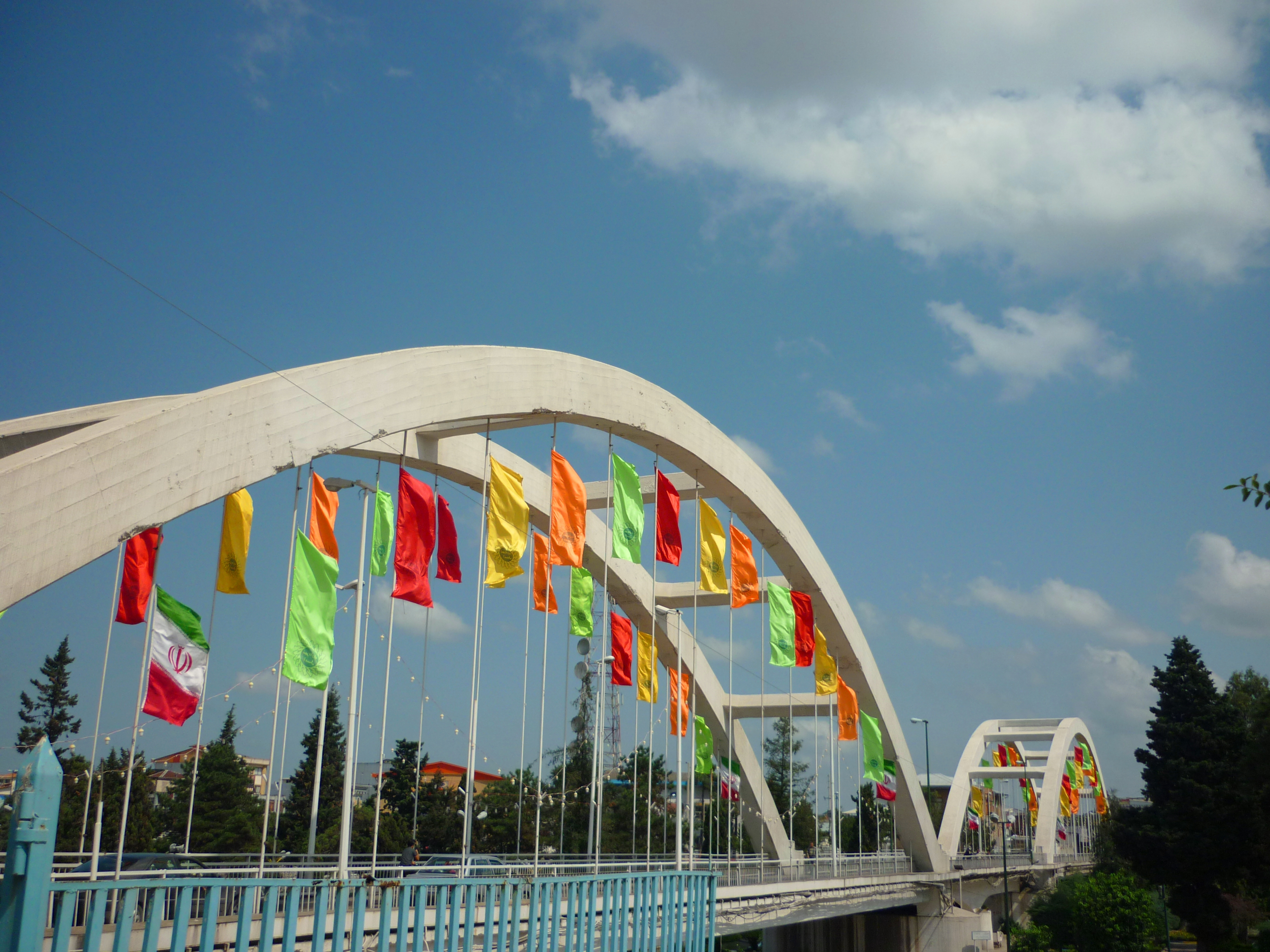
View of the bridge

Moalagh Bridge or Amol Suspension Bridge and Noo Bridge and Felezi Bridge is a bridge in Amol, Iran. The bridge was built during the Pahlavi era in 1959 on Haraz River and by German engineers. The Moalagh Bridge is a valuable monument of Mazandaran province, connecting East and West Amol city.

== Sources ==
- General Specifications of Mazandaran Province - Ministry of Industry
- Persia and the Persian Question - Page 381
- Structural Identification of Bridges (Case Study: Mazandaran, Iran) by J. Civil
- Iran. Ediz. Inglese Book
- Architecture of Iran bridges
