= Dabuy-ye Jonubi Rural District =

Rural district in Mazandaran province, Iran

Dabuy-ye Jonubi Rural District Persian: دهستان دابوئ جنوبي
- Rural District
- Location within Iran
- Coordinates: 36°30′N 52°27′E
- Country: Iran
- Province: Mazandaran
- County: Amol
- District: Dabudasht
- Established: 1987
- Capital: Raisabad

Population (2016)
  - Total: 19,077
- Time zone: UTC+3:30 (IRST)

Dabuy-ye Jonubi Rural District (Persian: دهستان دابوئ جنوبي) is in Dabudasht District of Amol County, Mazandaran province, Iran. Its capital is the village of Raisabad.

== Demographics ==
=== Population ===
At the time of the 2006 National Census, the rural district's population was 37,796 in 9,793 households. There were 38,352 inhabitants in 11,404 households at the following census of 2011. The 2016 census measured the population of the rural district as 19,077 in 6,411 households. The most populous of its 51 villages was Rashkola, with 2,669 people.

=== Other villages in the rural district ===
- Abdangesar
- Abolhassan Abad
- Alu
- Aminabad
- Ashrafabad
- Aski Mahalleh
- Aspahi Kola
- Bala Hashtal
- Bamer Kola
- Banesar Kola
- Bur Mahalleh
- Chareh
- Dangepia
- Darzi Kola
- Dau Kola
- Deyeh
- Espiarbon
- Espiyari
- Galesh Kola
- Hajjiabad
- Hasanabad
- Hoseynabad
- Kalik Sar
- Kamangar Kola
- Kashi Mahalleh
- Kord Kheyl
- Mahut Kola
- Mamraz Koti
- Mian Rud
- Motahhar-e Olya
- Motahhar-e Sofla
- Musa Mahalleh
- Naijabad
- Narges Marz
- Naserabad
- Pain Hashtal
- Palham Koti
- Pasha Kola
- Qala Koti
- Shah Kola
- Shahr-e Koti
- Shanehband
- Shariatabad
- Soltanabad
- Surak
- Taherabad
- Tanha Kola
- Tazehabad
- Tuleh Kola
- Yusefabad
