= Amol County =

County in Mazandaran province, Iran

Amol County Persian: شهرستان آمل
- County
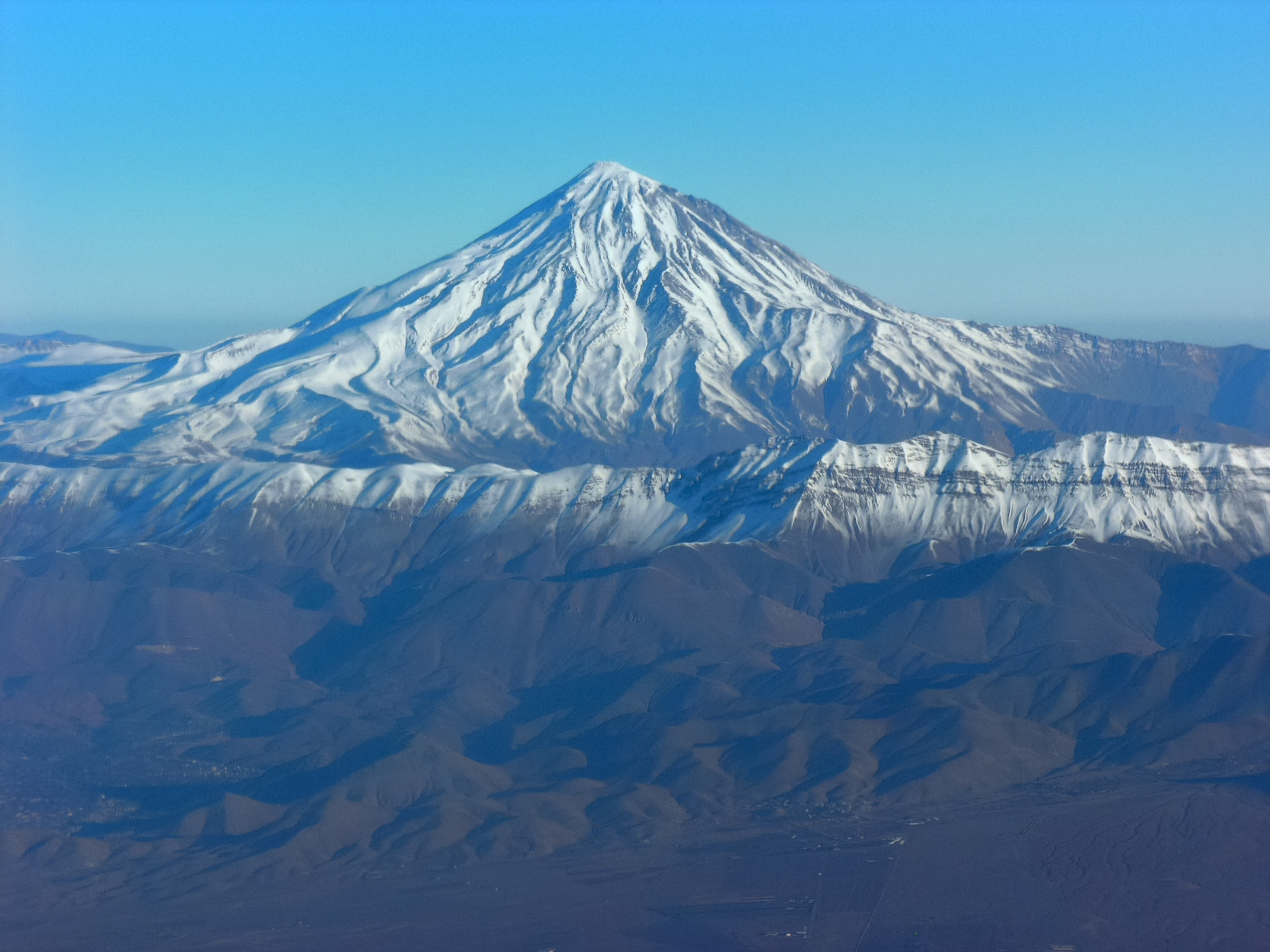
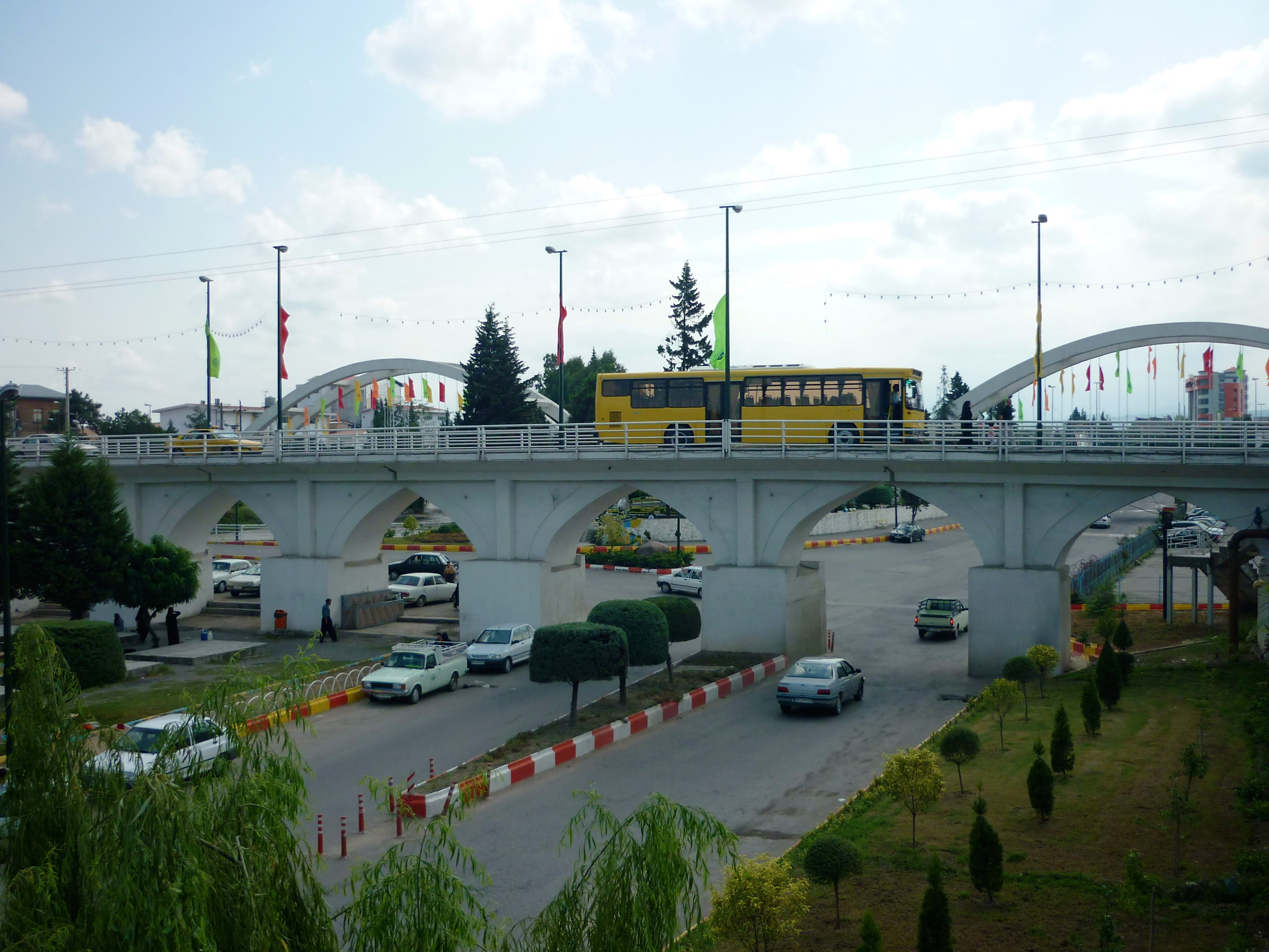
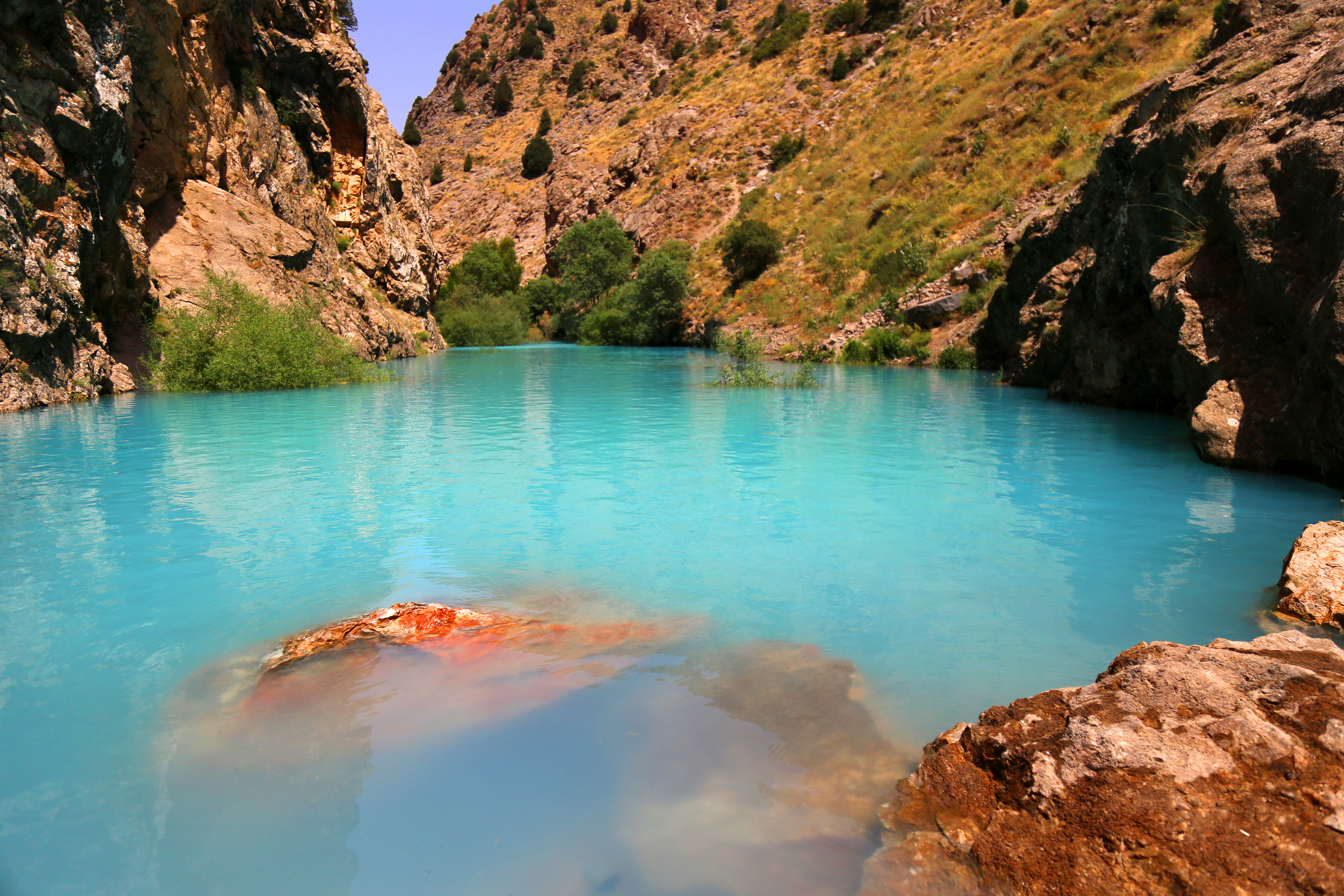
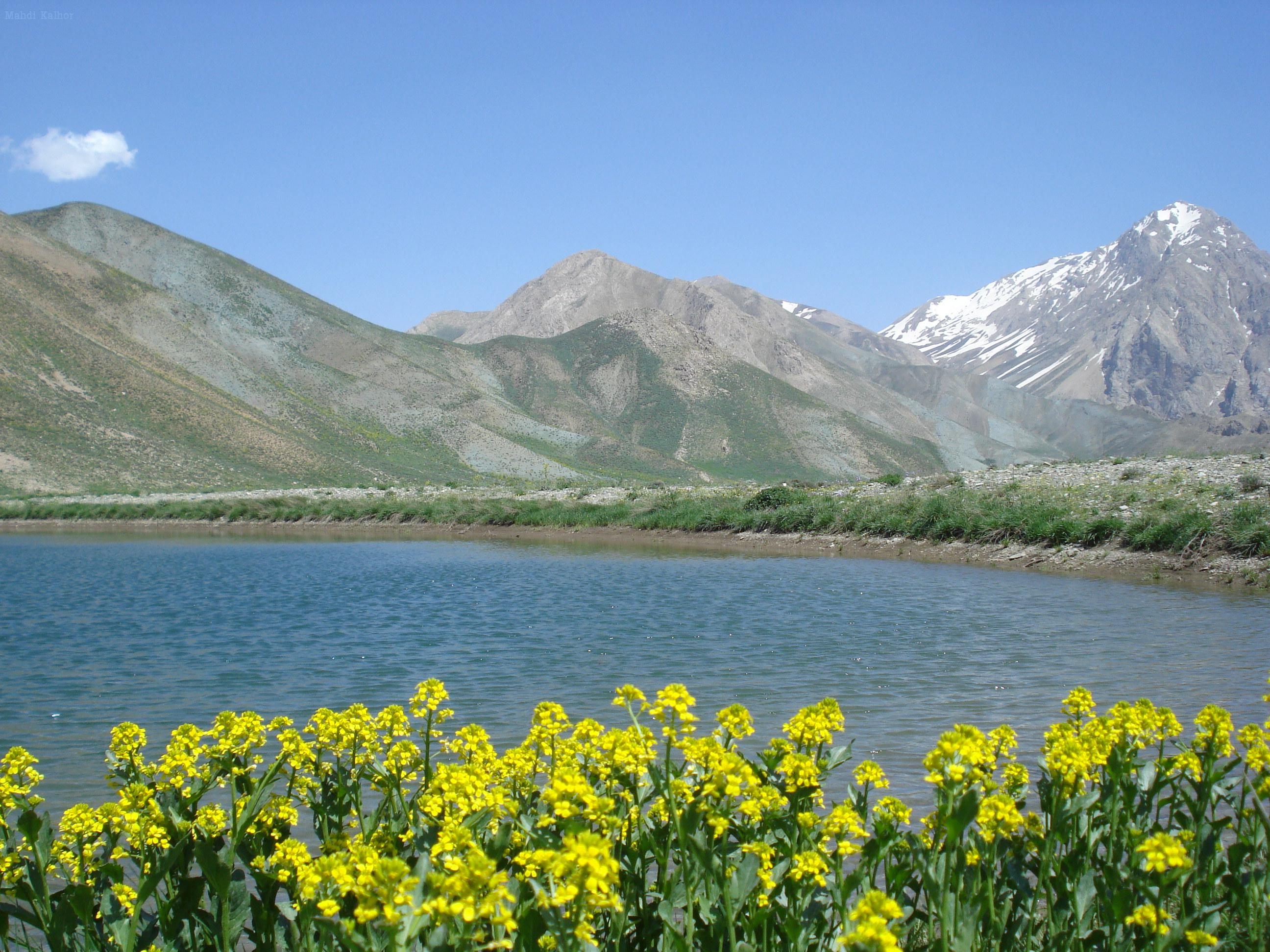
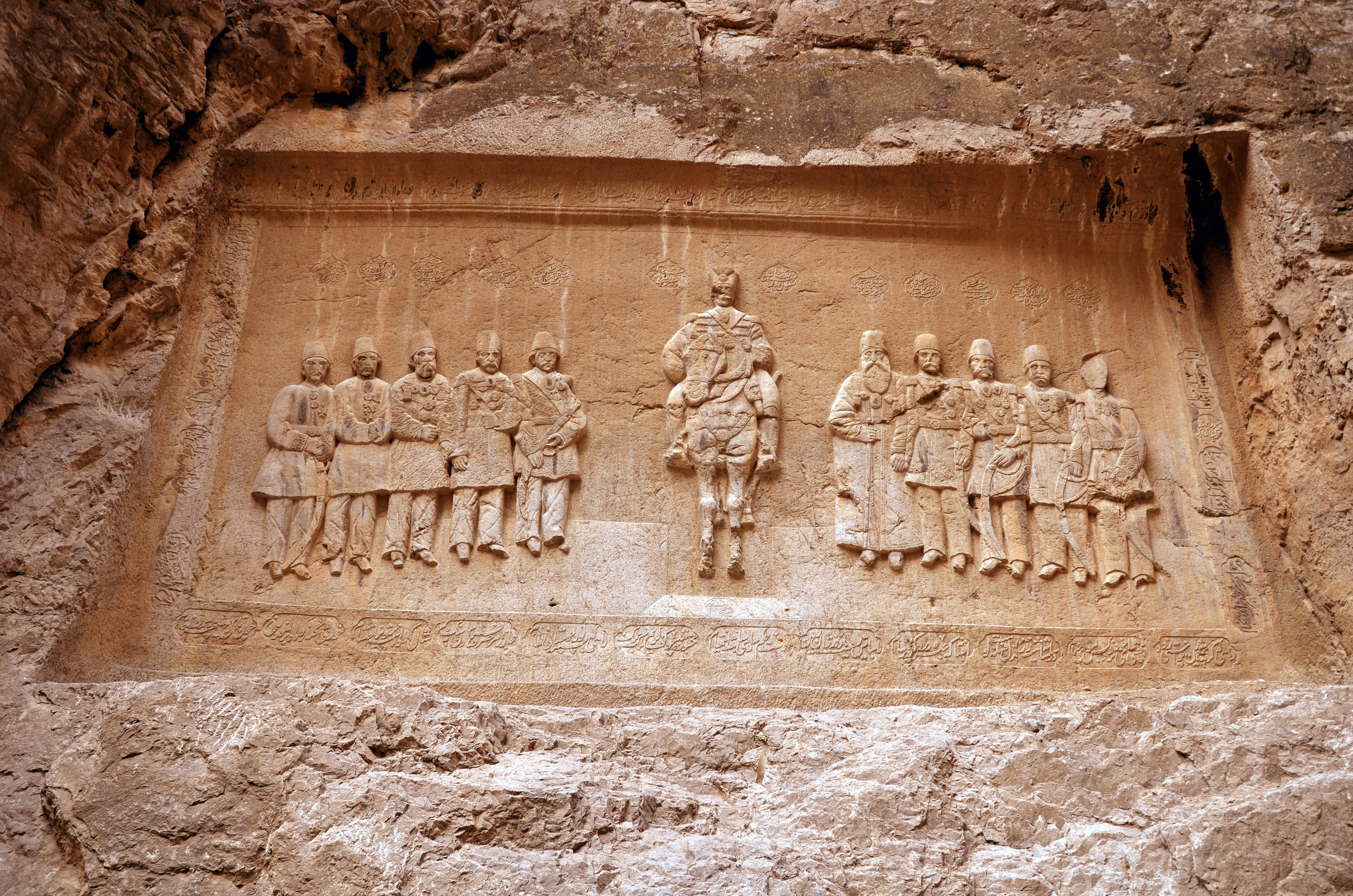
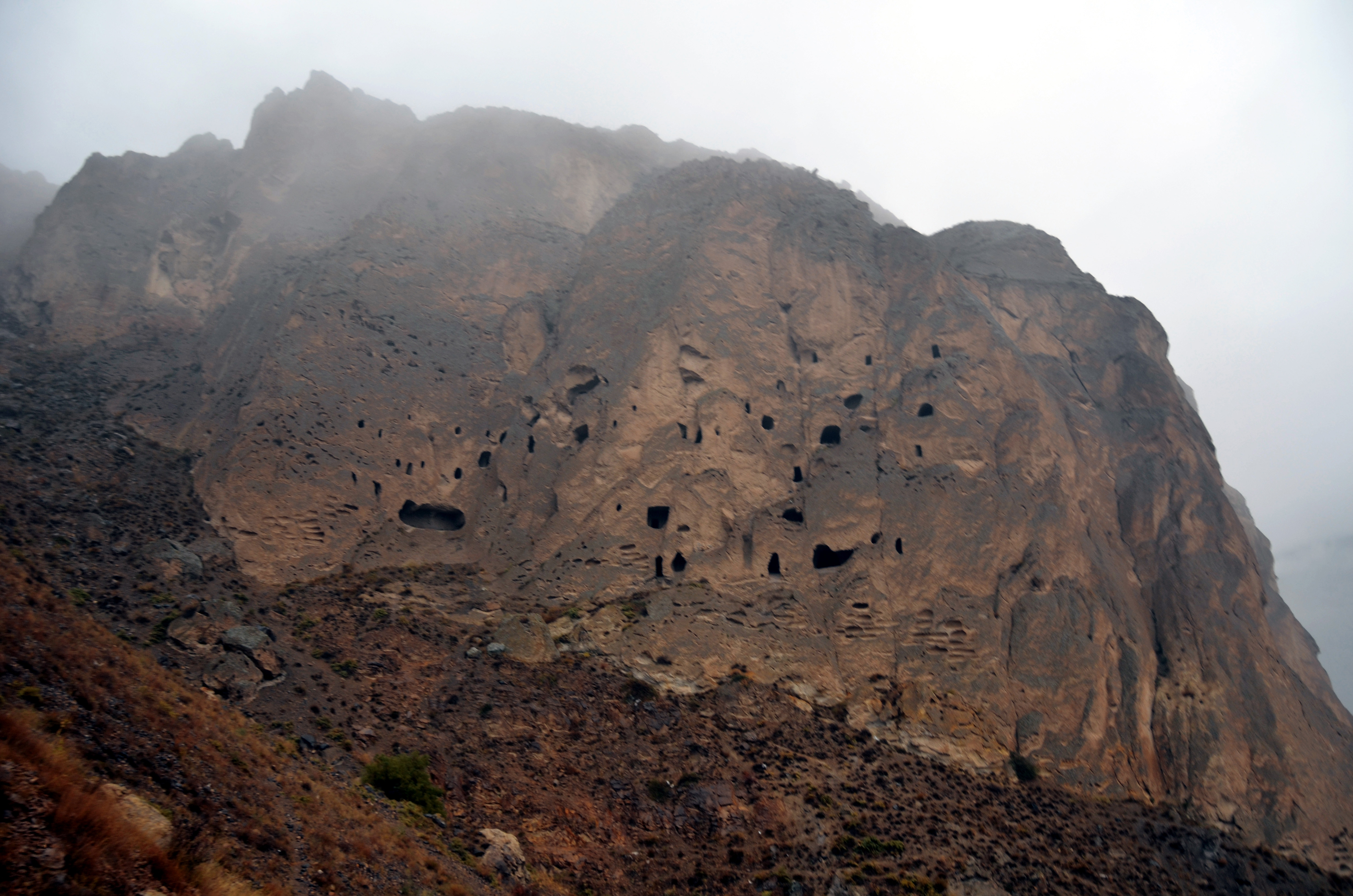
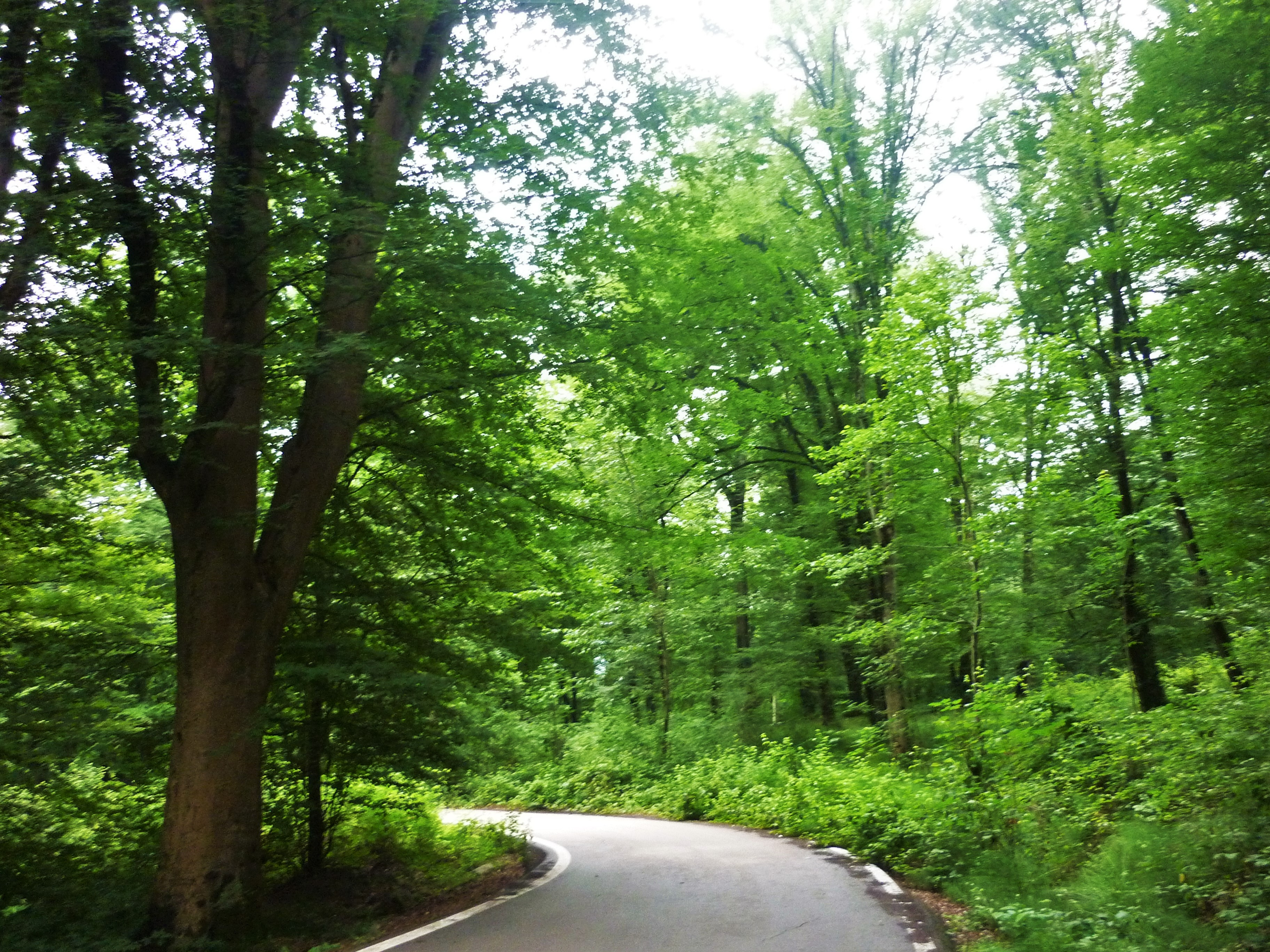
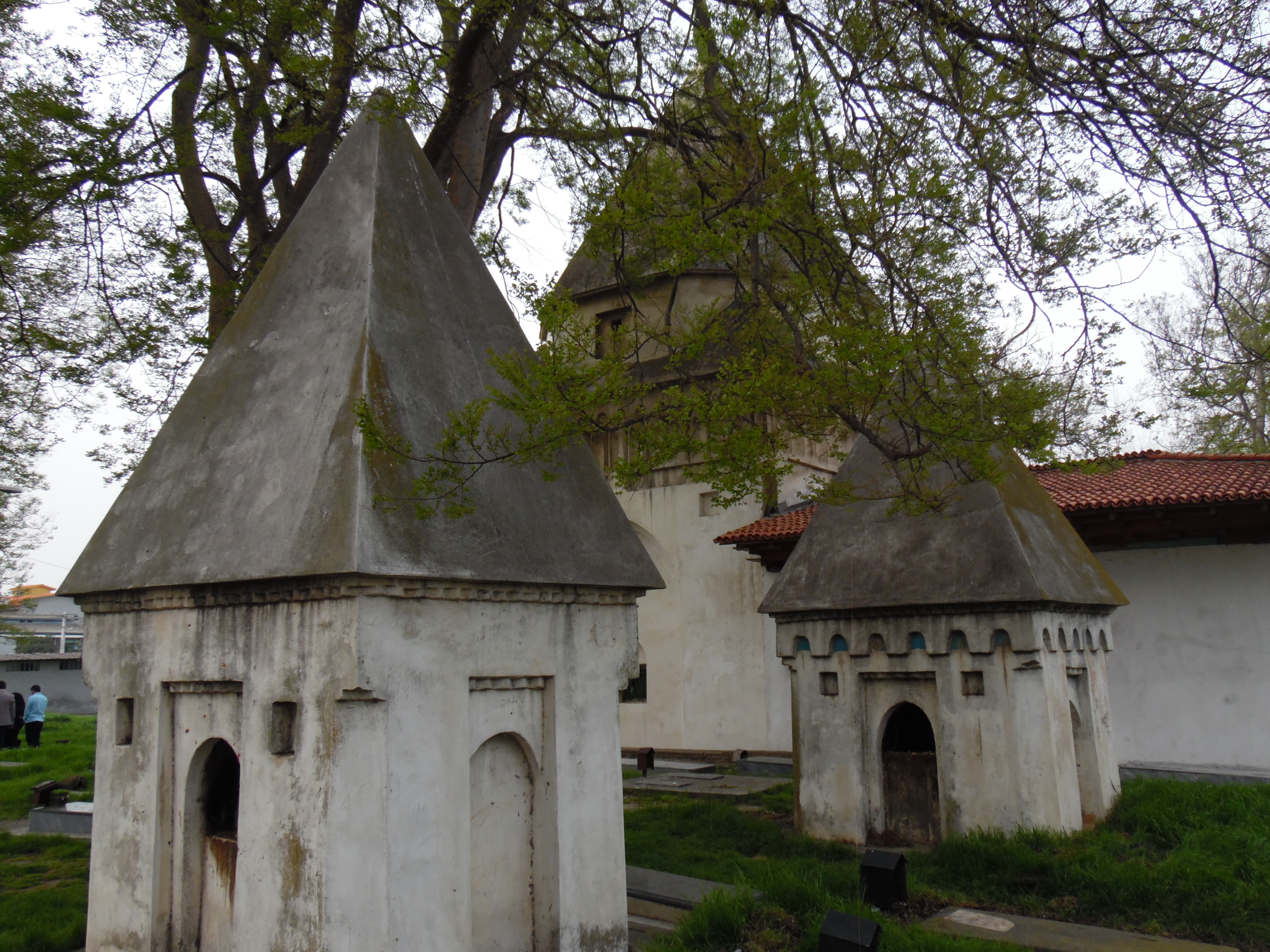

- Location of Amol County in Mazandaran province (center, green)

- Location of Mazandaran province in Iran
- Coordinates: 36°10′N 52°21′E
- Country: Iran
- Province: Mazandaran
- Established: 1946
- Capital: Amol
- Districts: Central, Dabudasht, Dasht-e Sar, Emamzadeh Abdollah, Larijan

Government
  - Governor: Mostafa Savadkouhi
  - MP: Reza Hajipour

Area
  - Total: 4,374 km^{2} (1,689 sq mi)

Population (2016)
  - Total: 401,639
  - Density: 91.82/km^{2} (237.8/sq mi)
- Time zone: UTC+3:30 (IRST)
- Ethnic groups: Mazandarani
- Language: Mazandarani, Persian

Amol County (Persian: شهرستان آمل) is in Mazandaran province, Iran. Its capital is the city of Amol.

== History ==
In 2010, Dasht-e Sar-e Sofla Rural District was created in the Central District. Bala Khiyaban-e Litkuh and Chelav Rural Districts were separated from it in the formation of Emamzadeh Abdollah District.

The village of Emamzadeh Abdollah was converted to a city in 2012. Additionally in the same year, Dabuy-ye Miyani Rural District was created in Dabudasht District, and Dasht-e Sar Rural District (Note: Renamed Dasht-e Sar-e Sharqi Rural District) was separated from it in the establishment of Dasht-e Sar District, which was divided into two rural districts, including the new Dasht-e Sar-e Gharbi Rural District.

The village of Ejbar Kola was converted to a city in 2017 and renamed Babakan in 2019.

== Demographics ==
=== Population ===
At the time of the 2006 National Census, the county's population was 343,747 in 93,194 households. The following census in 2011 counted 370,774 people in 112,297 households. The 2016 census measured the population of the county as 401,639 in 133,034 households.

=== Administrative divisions ===
Amol County's population history and administrative structure over three consecutive censuses are shown in the following table.

Amol County Population
Administrative Divisions	2006	2011	2016
Central District	260,971	271,269	296,800
Bala Khiyaban-e Litkuh RD	22,171		
Chelav RD	4,247		
Dasht-e Sar-e Sofla RD		10,689	11,423
Harazpey-ye Jonubi RD	16,404	16,060	18,460
Pain Khiyaban-e Litkuh RD	20,679	24,605	29,389
Amol (city)	197,470	219,915	237,528
Dabudasht District	74,687	76,553	39,476
Dabuy-ye Jonubi RD	37,796	38,352	19,077
Dabuy-ye Miyani RD			18,641
Dasht-e Sar RD	35,795	37,032	
Dabudasht (city) (Note: Formerly Darvish Kheyl)	1,096	1,169	1,758
Dasht-e Sar District			38,888
Dasht-e Sar-e Gharbi RD			18,742
Dasht-e Sar-e Sharqi RD (Note: Formerly Dasht-e Sar Rural District)			20,146
Babakan (city) (Note: Became a city after the 2016 census)			
Emamzadeh Abdollah District		16,068	17,791
Bala Khiyaban-e Litkuh RD		11,605	7,303
Chelav RD		4,463	4,720
Emamzadeh Abdollah (city) (Note: Formerly the village of Esku Mahalleh)			5,768
Larijan District	8,089	6,884	8,684
Bala Larijan RD	4,043	2,992	3,746
Larijan-e Sofla RD	2,863	2,910	3,637
Gazanak (city)	323	200	319
Rineh (city)	860	782	982
Total	343,747	370,774	401,639
RD = Rural District

== Geography ==
=== Location ===
Amol's neighbour counties are Babol in the east, Mahmudabad in the north, Babolsar in the northeast, Nur in the west in Mazandaran province, and Tehran province in the south.

=== Topography ===
This area with its elevated landscape and valleys has dense forests. Its tall hills overlook the plains and stretch out till the high slopes of the Damavand Mountains. The majestic and deep rocky valleys, rivers, numerous springs, elevated waterfalls, colorful vegetation, a variety of wild life, thermal springs, summer quarters, and rural settlements are some of the special factors which can prove attractive.

- Mirza Kuchak Khan Forest Park: The same is located 18 km. on the Amol - Tehran road, the Haraz River flowing on the eastern side of which.
- Alimastan: Alimestan Jungle is known as the Green Gold, dense fog, thick and green forests. The forest habitat plant "Alyma" grows in May which name is derived from the forest Alimestan. It has low temperature in the hot season. Numerous springs, diverse forest covers, plain and clear water, and horses are the indicators of the forest. Above all this, the Alimestan peak, about 2510 meters high, attracts many hikers in the winter and spring.
- Baliran There has thick forests and meadows. up until present Garm Rud 2 is the only well dated Upper Paleolithic settlement at the north of Iranian plateau. The land around the Baleyrān normal hill, but in the north it is flat.
- Halumsar
- Ziaru

=== Natural attractions ===
The area is home to multiple valleys, rivers, springs and waterfalls alongside diverse wildlife.

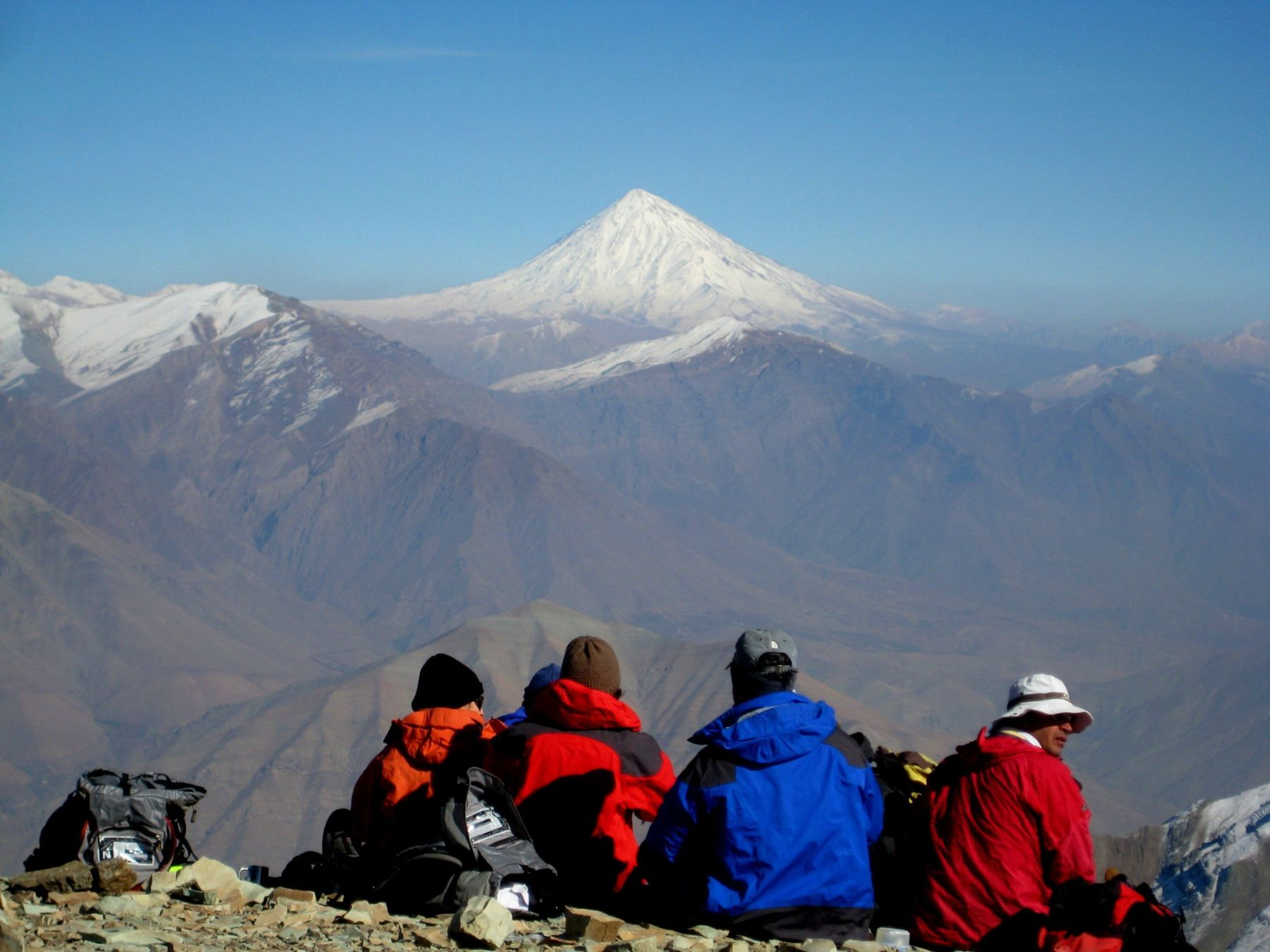
Mount Damavand, 5610 m, the highest point in the Middle East, is located in Larijan district of Amol.

Mount Damavand, 5610 m, the highest point in the Middle East

=== Lar and Damavand Mountains ===
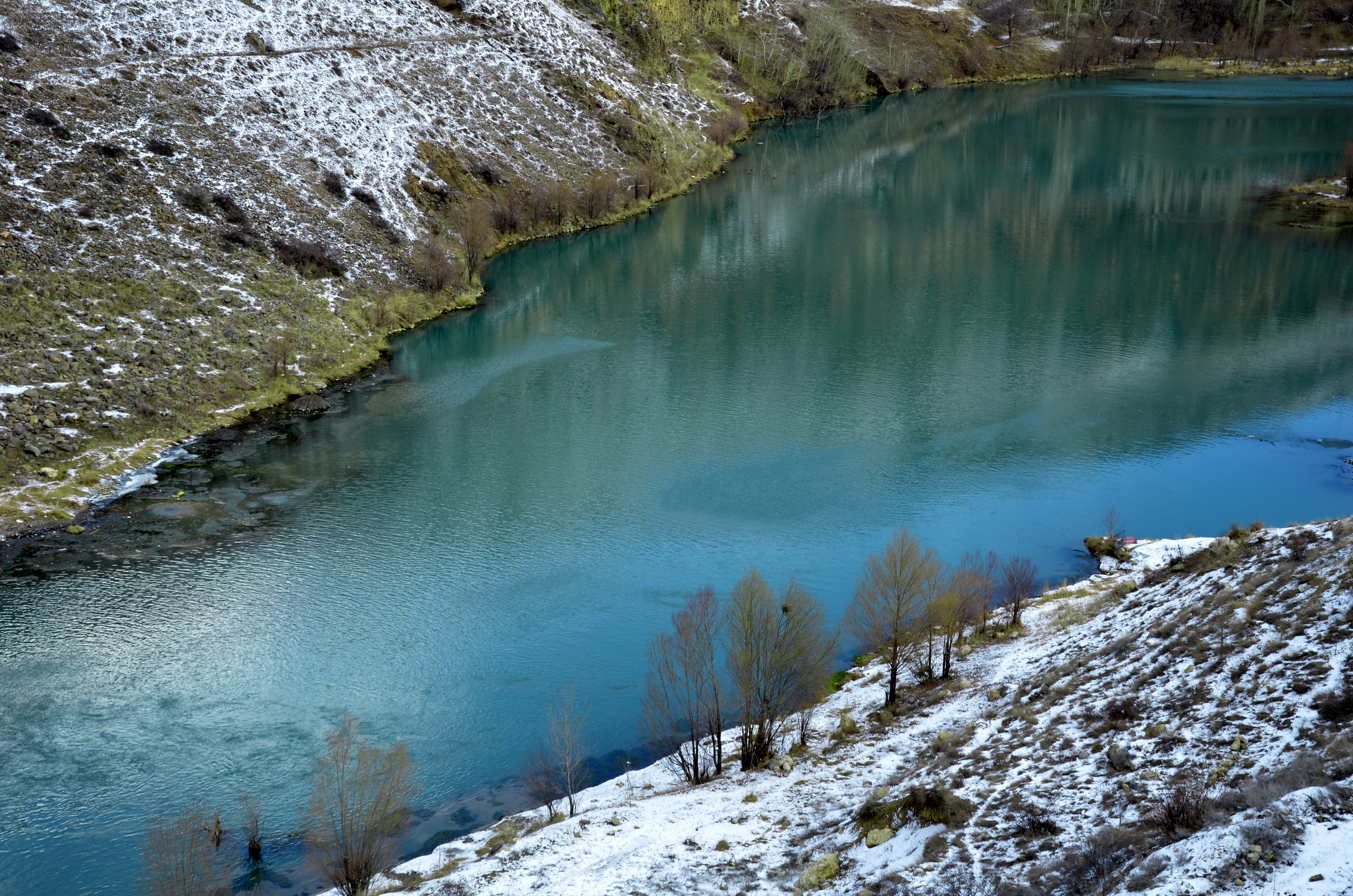
The Haraz begins in Mount Damavand and flows northward

These mountains form the two branch ranges of the central Alborz Mountains, and are the highest sections of this range. To the north, after the Kahu (Sefid Ab) Pass, in the village of Garmabdar (district of Roodbar-e-Qasran), it sub-divides into two, the north western and south eastern ranges. In the south western sector are the peaks of Takht-e-khers and Se sang, extending towards the west, where the gigantic Damavand Peak is visible.

In the southeastern sector, after running along the plains of Lar, the peaks of Haft Saran are apparent, and to the south of these plains are the peaks of Mehr Chal, Atashkadeh, Siyah Chal and Maaz. In the south eastern direction it joins the Khansak and Shad Kooh Mountains.

Shahandasht Waterfall

=== Haraz River ===
The Haraz River's source is in the skirts of the Alborz Mountains in the region of Larijan. After flowing along the Haraz Road and Valley for about 100 km. it meanders in the midst of the city of Amol, from where it reaches the Caspian Sea. The fringes of this river are utilized as recreational areas as well as for fishing.

=== Waterfall ===
- Shahandasht: The Shahandasht Waterfall is the highest waterfall of Mazandaran Province. It is located in Shahandasht Village, 65 kilometers away from Amol, next to the Haraz Road from Amol to Tehran. It is 51 meters high flowing from the heart of Alborz Mountain. The waterfall consists of three waterfalls which make it 180 meters high. One can reach the waterfall by passing through the bridge of Vana Village and reaching the village of Shahandasht and walk towards the waterfall for 15 minutes on foot.
- Amiri: Amiri waterfall’s height is more than 20 meters. It is located in Amiri Village, which is 120 km away from Tehran.

In order to reach this waterfall not much walking is needed, one could get to the waterfall by simply following the twentieth Shams Abad ally towards its end.

- Yakhi: Yakhi Waterfall with a height of 12 meters, is located in the vicinity of Doudkouh Mountain near the southern part of Damavand Peak in Mazandaran province.

This waterfall is completely frozen throughout the year; however, the melting glacier above it trickles water down for a short period during the summer. The said waterfall is one of its own in the world.

The other proposed Waterfall in county named, Ab Murad, Plas, Tara, Sang Darka, Qaleh Dokhtar, Peromed and Deryouk.

=== Springs and mineral water ===
- Ab Garm-e Larijan Thermal Springs: This thermal spring is near the Rineh village (Larijan). Its water is used in the treatment of joint disorders, skin diseases and infections. Damavand has some thermal springs (Abe Garm Larijan) with therapeutic qualities. These mineral hot springs are mainly located on the volcano's flanks and at the base, giving evidence of volcanic heat comparatively near the surface of the earth. While no historic eruptions have been recorded, hot springs at the base and on the flanks, and fumaroles and solfatara near the summit, indicate a hot or cooling magma body still present beneath the volcano, so that Damavand is a potentially active volcano.

In this village there are many hot baths. Of about 1,000 liters of water per minute Chshmە larijan SPA is removed. Its temperature is between 65 and 70 degrees Celsius. The unpleasant taste and odor of hydrogen sulfide and water color is clear. This is the source of magnesium and bicarbonate salts for skin disease, old wounds, rheumatism, respiratory tract diseases and neurological disorders is beneficial. Bath's monuments in the village of Shah Abbas Safavid period is related to The most important of these hot springs are located in Abe Garm Larijan in a village by the name Larijan in the district of Larijan in Lar Valley . The water from this spring is useful in the treatment of chronic wounds and skin diseases. Near these springs there are public baths with small pools for public use

- Ab Ask Thermal Springs: These springs are located in a village by the same name in the district of Larijan. Surrounding this spring are limestone deposits which through the passage of time turn into marble. The water from this spring is useful in the treatment of chronic wounds, and skin diseases.
- Amoloo Mineral Water Spring: The water from this spring can be used for drinking purposes, and is useful in treating gastro-intestinal disorders. The same can be used for skin diseases also.
- Alamol: This waterfall flows from the northern slopes of the Damavand Mountains, and is more than 100 m. in height. The massive output of water from this waterfall forms a spray like mist in the air and brings about a wonderful sight.
- Esterabekoh

== Economy ==
Mineral water, meat, dairy, Wood and ingots the main production industrial are. Agriculture and Tourism are the basis economy Amol economic base is in its provincial products. Agriculture has always been a major part of the economy in and around Amol. Amol is the economic center of Mazandaran province, with Agriculture, Industrial factories and Tourism being the base of the Amol economy. Rice, grain, fruits, cotton, tea, sugarcane, and silk are produced in the lowland. Mineral water, meat, dairy, wood and ingots are the main manufacturing industry.

== Industry ==
Amol has extensive human relations in the country due to its extensive economic activities, about 70 thousand workers are working in 5 industrial towns of Amol. Amol is Mazandaran's export pole 79% of Mazandaran exports belong to county. Amol owns 47% of the province's industry.

== Tourism ==
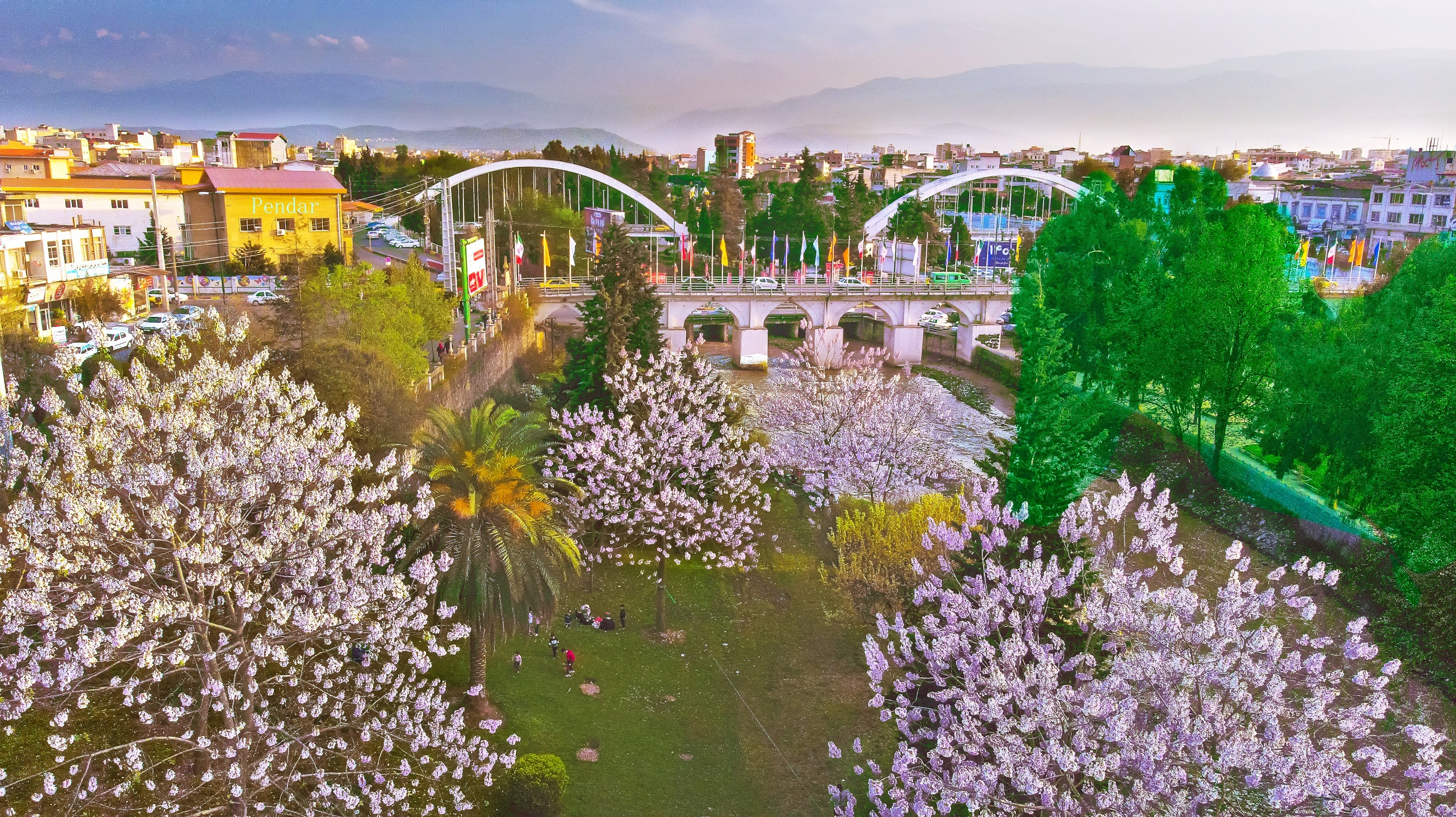
Viwe two Amol Bridge Together

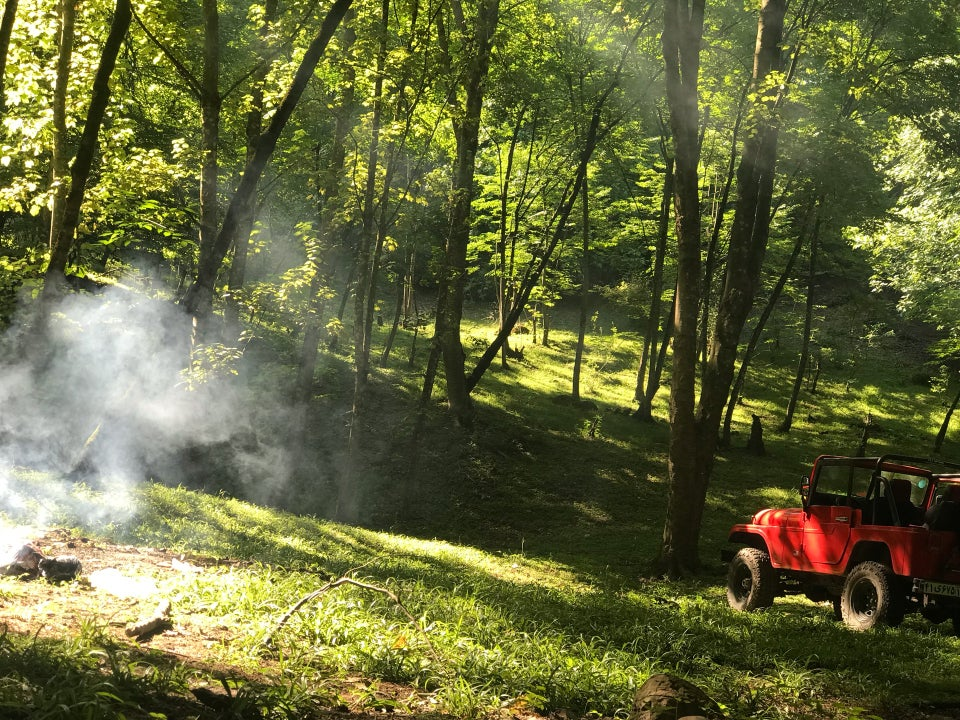
Alimastan

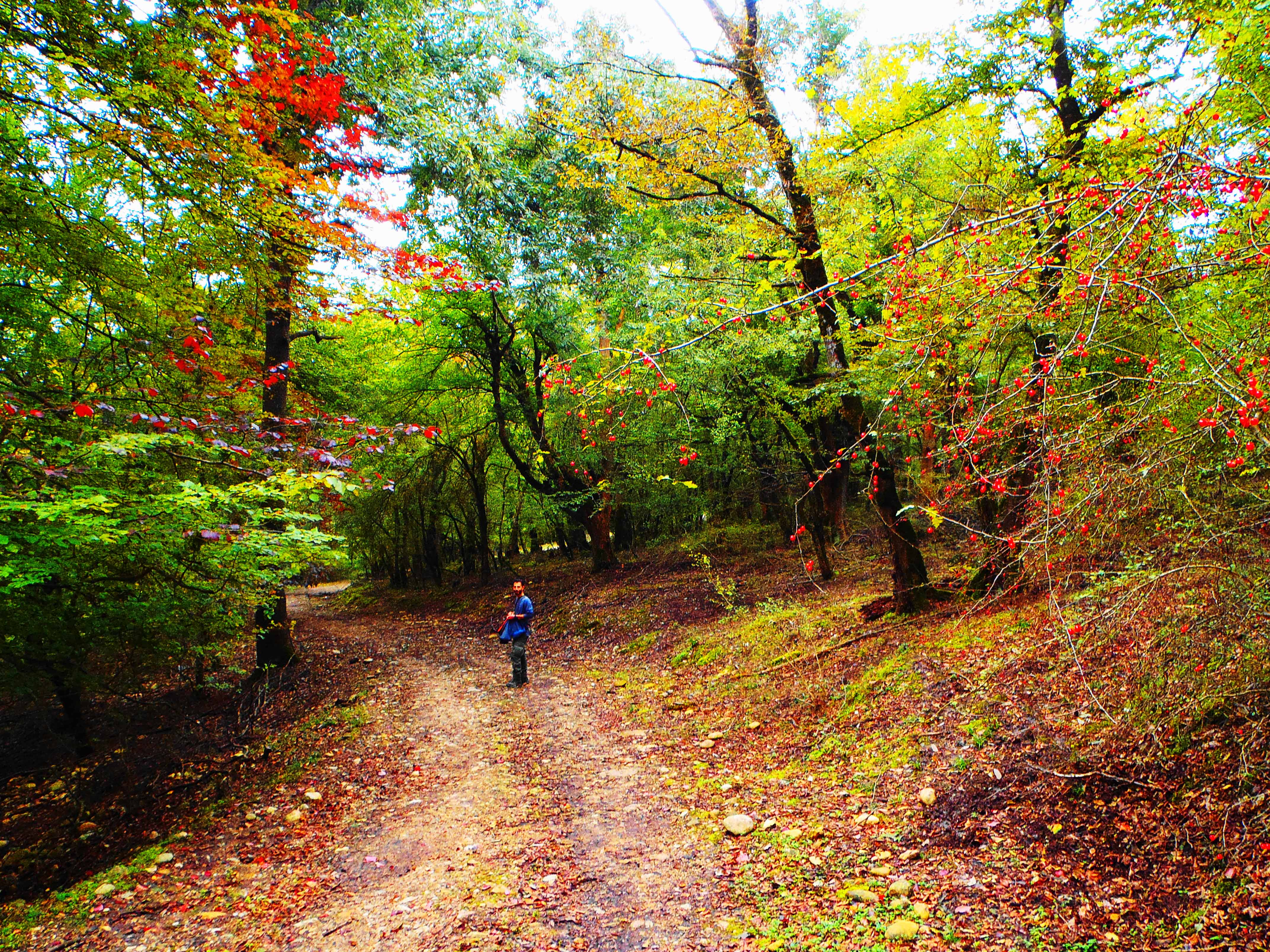
Baliran

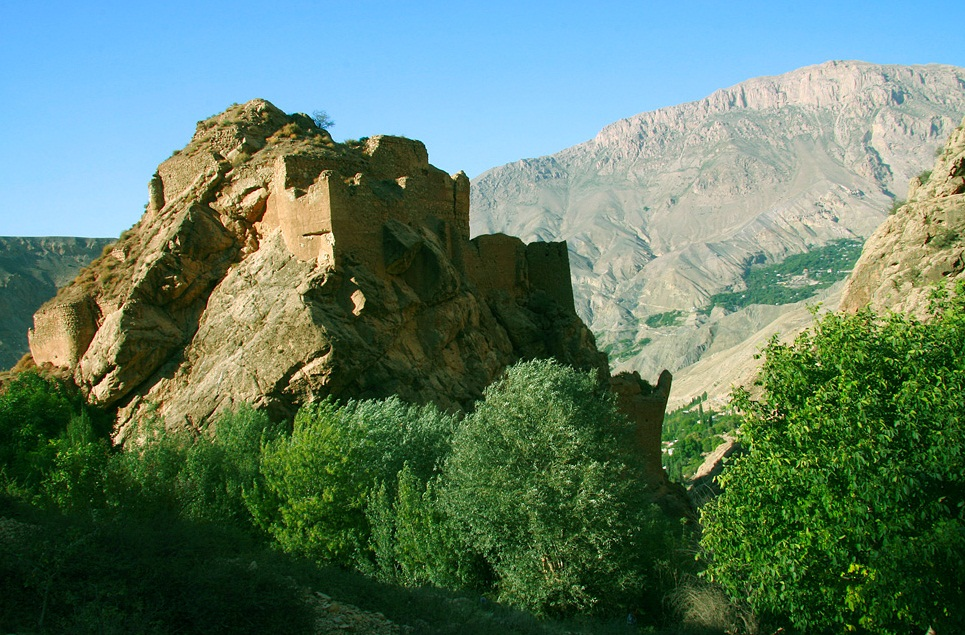
Malek Bahman Castle

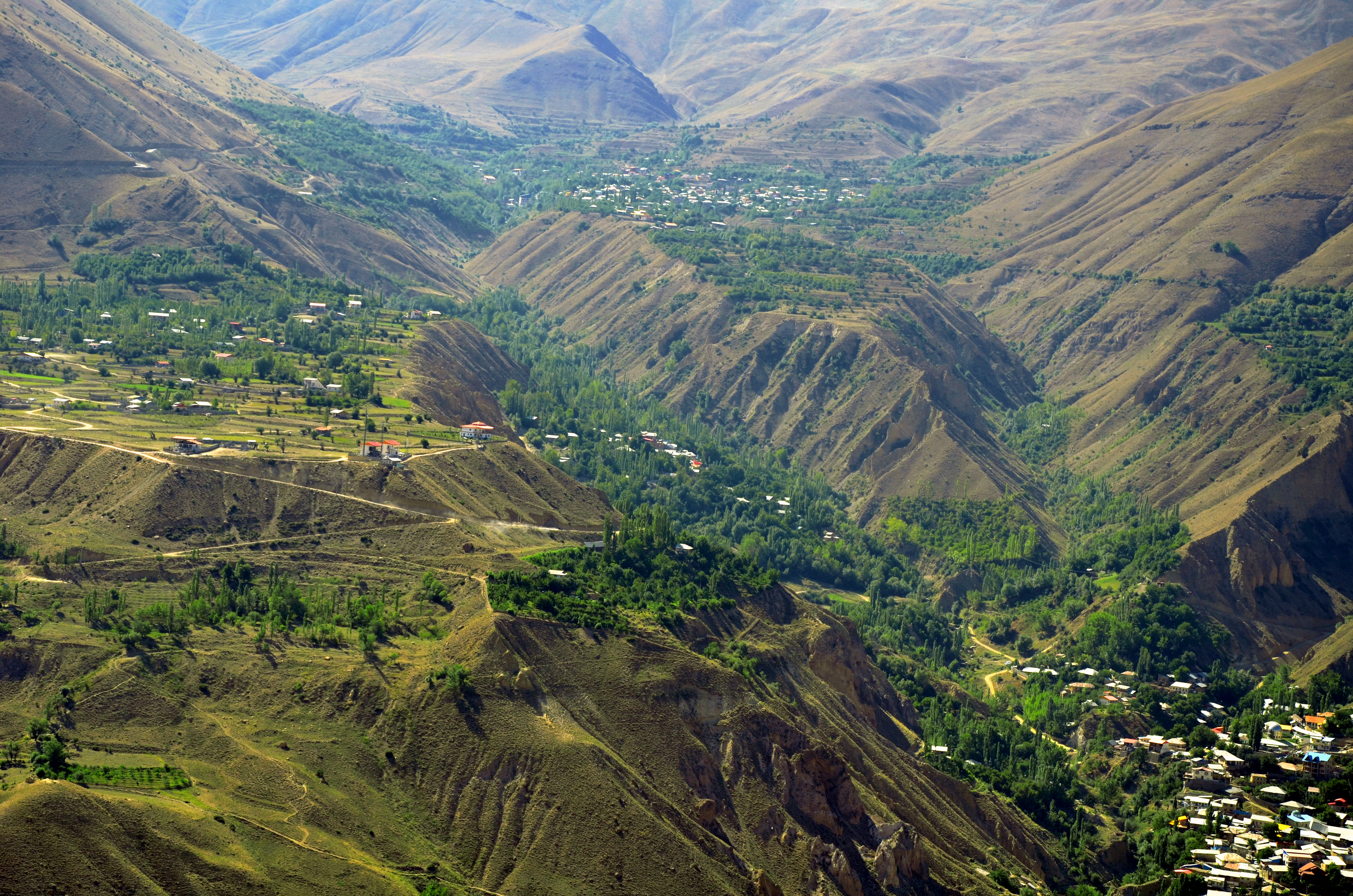
Reyneh

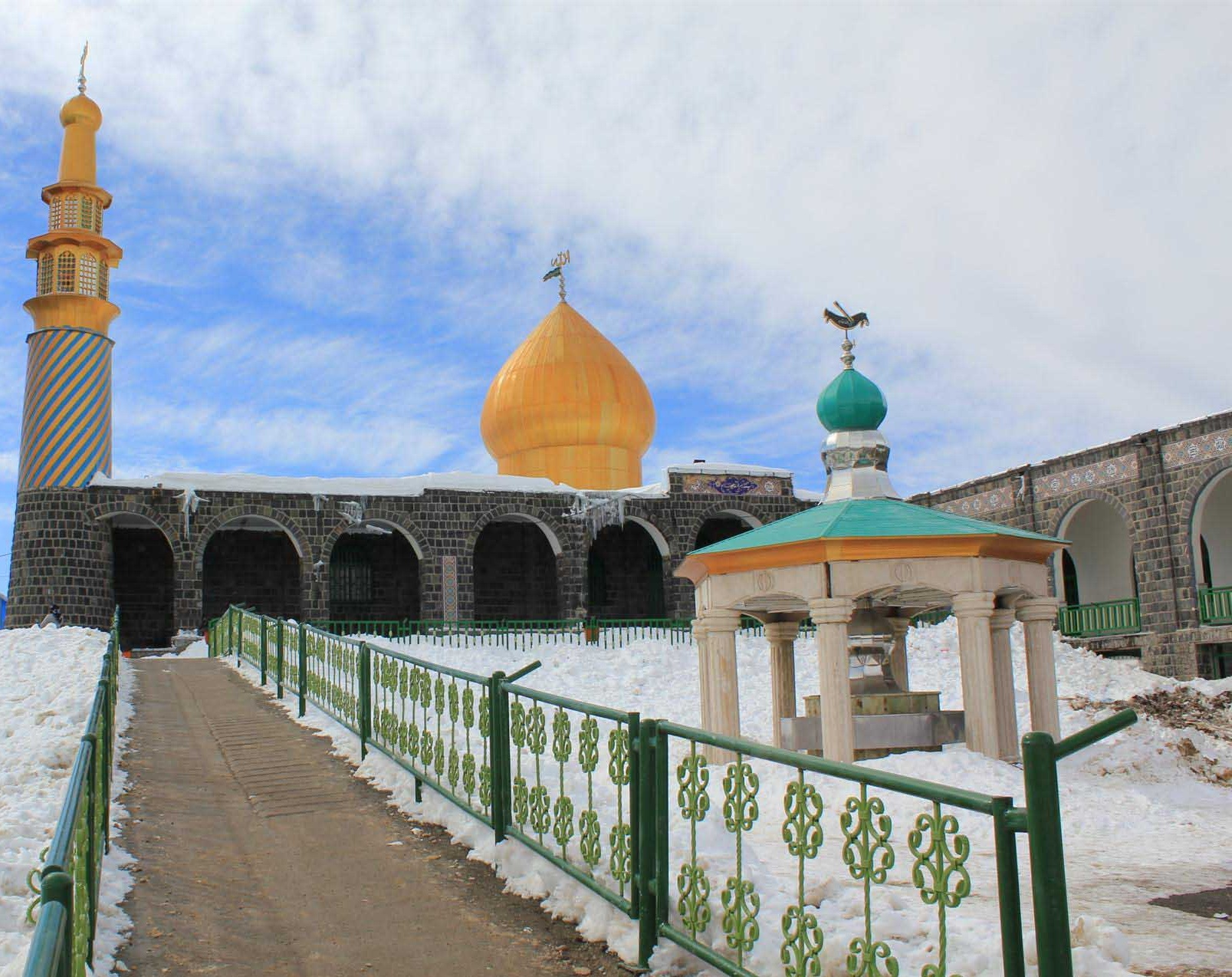
Imamzadeh Hashem

In the city and county there are many historical and natural attractions in Larijan. This region has mountain villages, plains and meadows. Now due to the Damavand Haraz River, trout is bred in the region of the Middle East. This is one of the mythic areas Iran named Arash.

- Damavand Mountain is a stratovolcano which is the highest peak in Iran and the Middle East. It has a special place in Persian mythology and folklore.
- Tomb of Mir Bozorg (Qavam al-Din Marashi Mausoleum)
- Lar Dam
- Lar National Park
- Fire temple Amol
- Naser-Ol-Hagh Kabir Mausoleum (Hasan al-Utrush Tomb tower)
- Sayyid Haydar Amoli (Seyyed Se Tan Tomb tower)
- Moalagh Bridge
- Davazdah Cheshmeh
- Waterfall Shahandasht
- Amol Bazaar
- Museum of History
- Imamzadeh Ibrahim (fa)
- Malek Bahman Castle Shrine
- Shekl-e Shah (Relief Naser al-Din Shah Qajar)
- Jame Mosque
- Agha Abbas Mosque
- Yakhi Waterfall
- Dokhaharan lake
- Waterfall Deryouk
- Shah Abbasi Baths
- Fireplace (known as Shams Al-Rasol)
- The Sasanian Road
- Tower Khidr Nabi
- Tomb of Sultan Shahabuddin
- Village forest Blairan
- Village forest Alimastan
- Gol-e Zard Cave
- Ashraf Bath
- Inn Kemboja
- House Manouchehri
- House Shafahi
- Heshtl Tower
- Mirza Muhammad Ali Mosque
- Kahrud Castle
- Sangi Bridge Polour
- Imam Hassan Askari Mosque
- Imamzadeh Qasem Shrine
- Imamzadeh Abdollah Shrine
- Mohammad Taher Shrine
- Ab ask Thermal Springs
- Lake Sahon
- Haj Ali Kochak Mosque
- Ab Murad Waterfall
- Sang Darka Waterfall
- Dehkadeh Talaei Park
- Amoloo Mineral Water Spring
- Forest Park Mirza Kuchak Khan Haraz
- Forest Park Halumsar
- Castle Kahrud
- Larijan Thermal Spring
- Hosseinieh of Amol
- Gabri Tower
- Mir-Safi Baths
- Tomb Darvish Sheikh Ismail
- Robat Sangi Polur
- Prairie anemone of Polur
- Ziaru Jungle
- Haj Ali Arbab House
- Do Berar Peak
- Ancient Hill Qaleh Kesh
- Larijan Thermal Spring
- Kolakchal Mountain
- Ghoredagh Mountain
- Municipal House
- Tekyeh Firuz Kola
- Pol-e Mun Castle
- Saghanefar Hendoukola
- Saghanefar Zarrin Kola
- Tekyeh Oji Abad
- Karna Cave
- Div Asiyab Spring

== Gallery ==
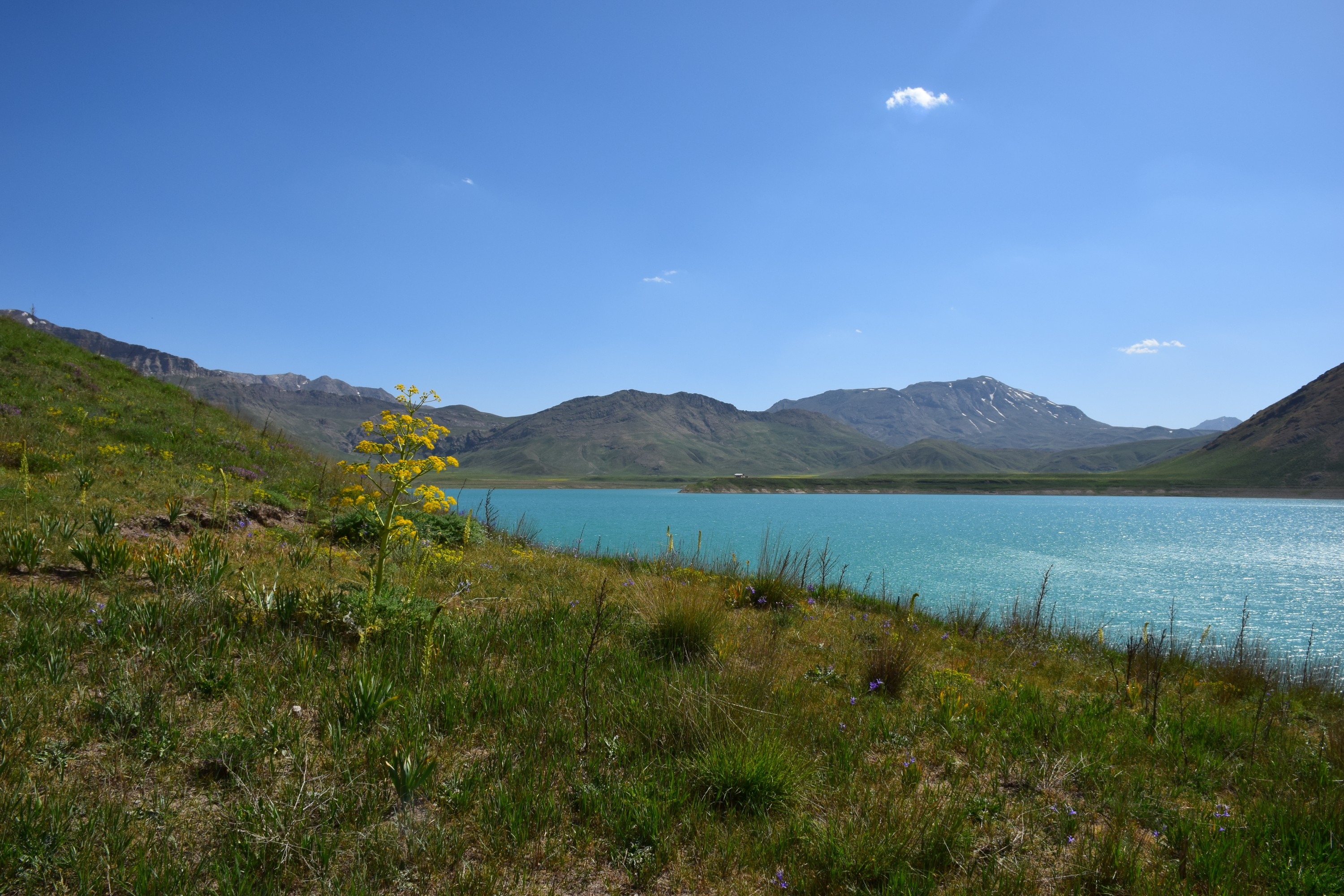
Lar National Park

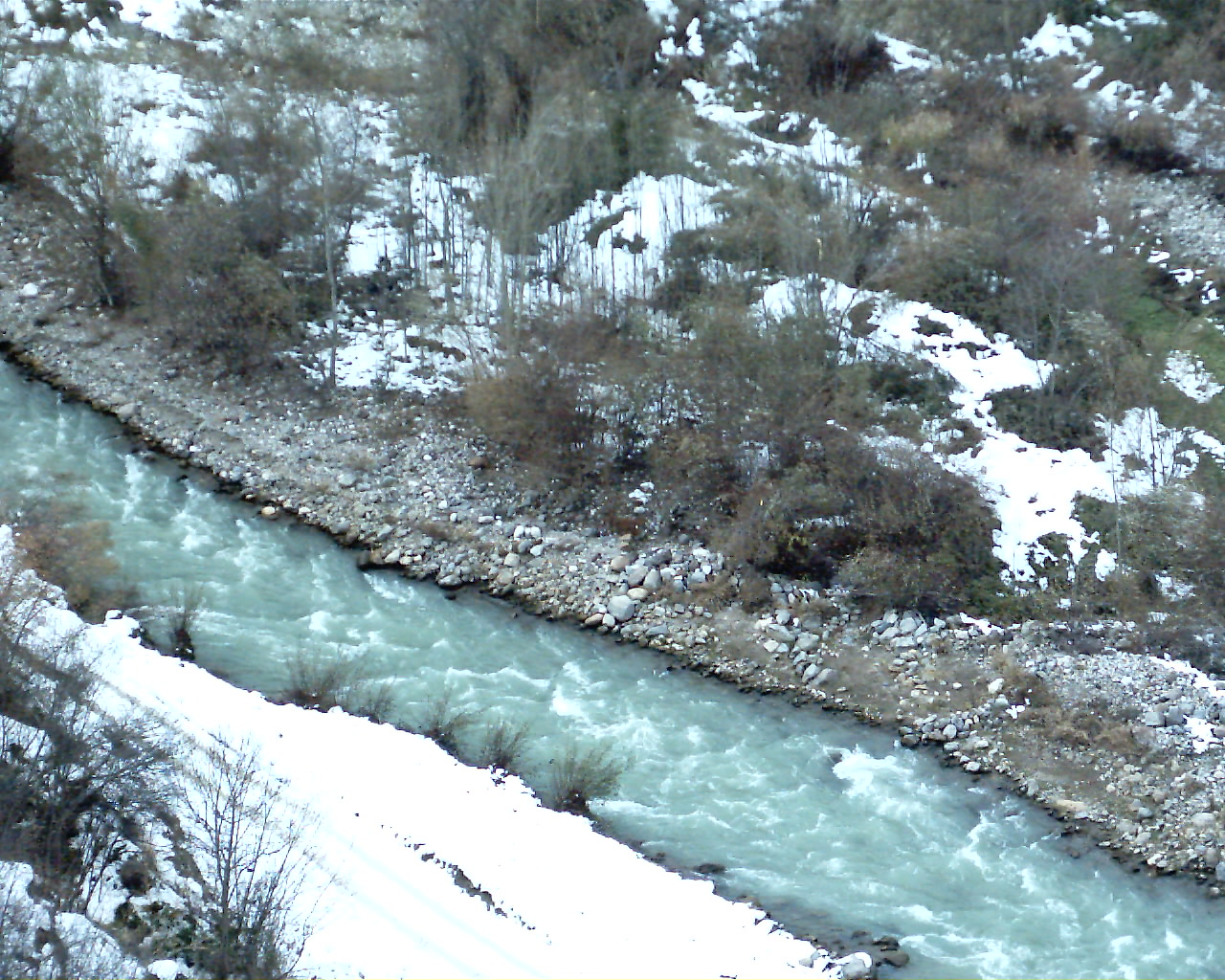
Haraz River

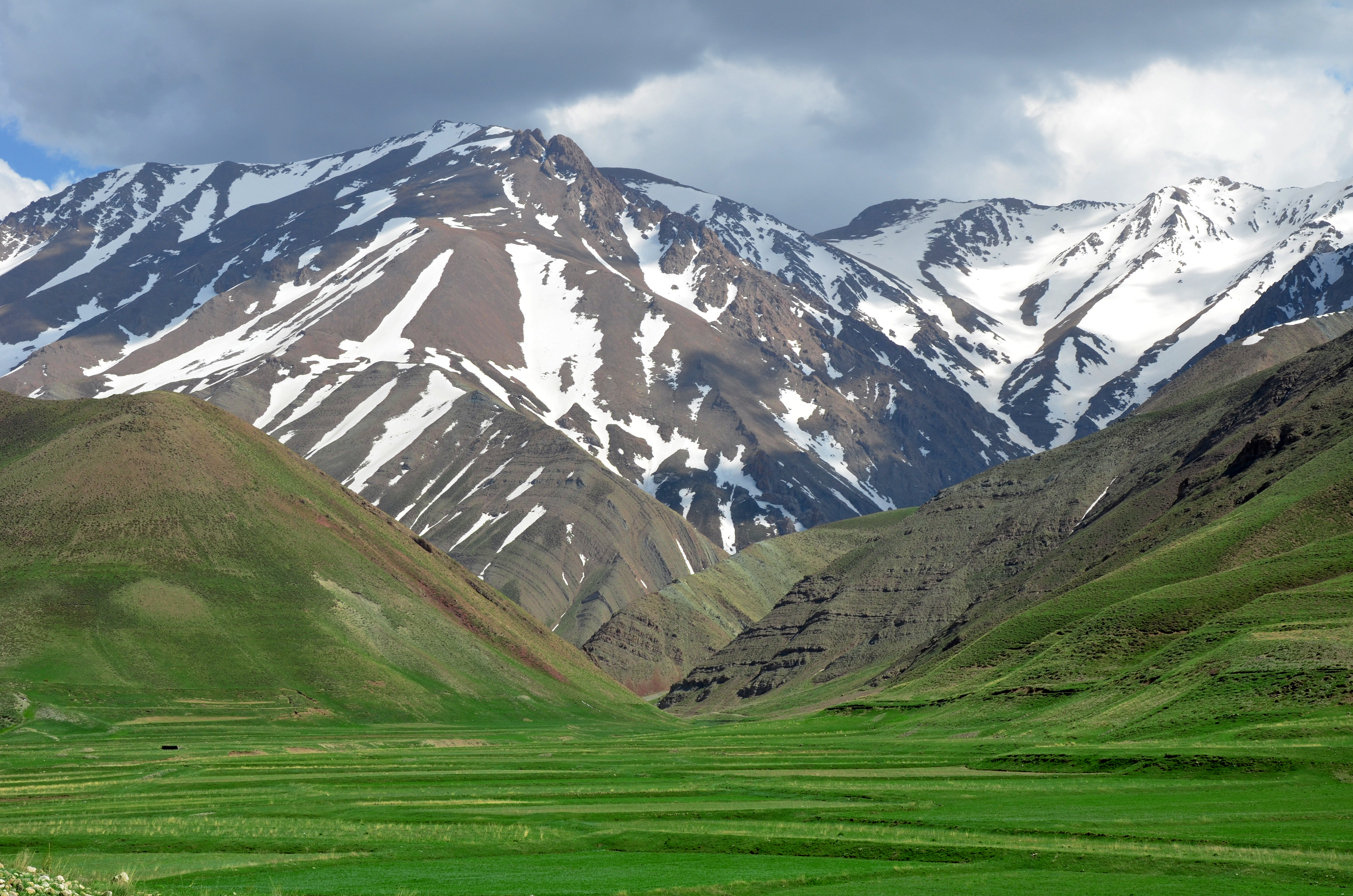
Lasem Road and Mount Doberar

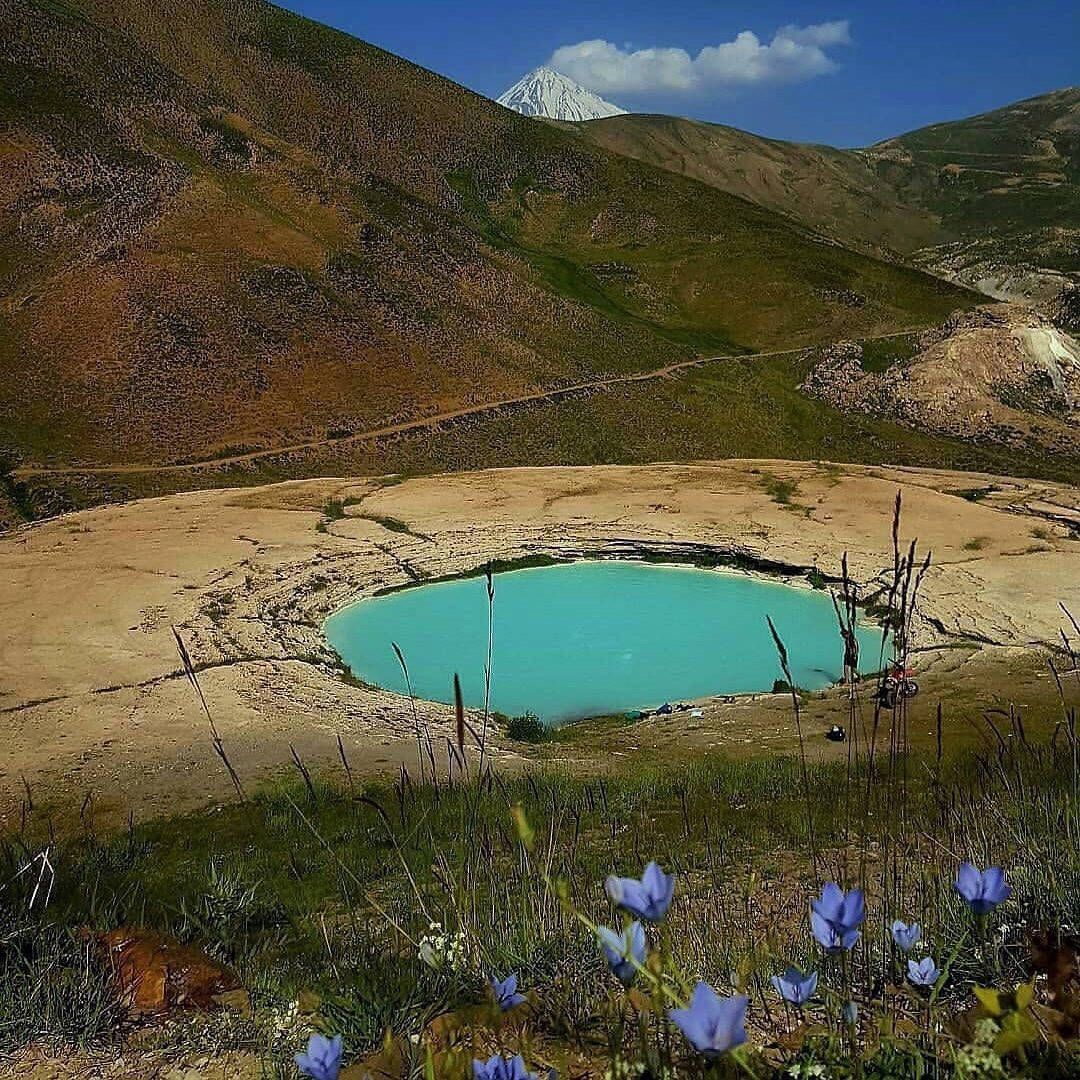
Div Asiyab Spring

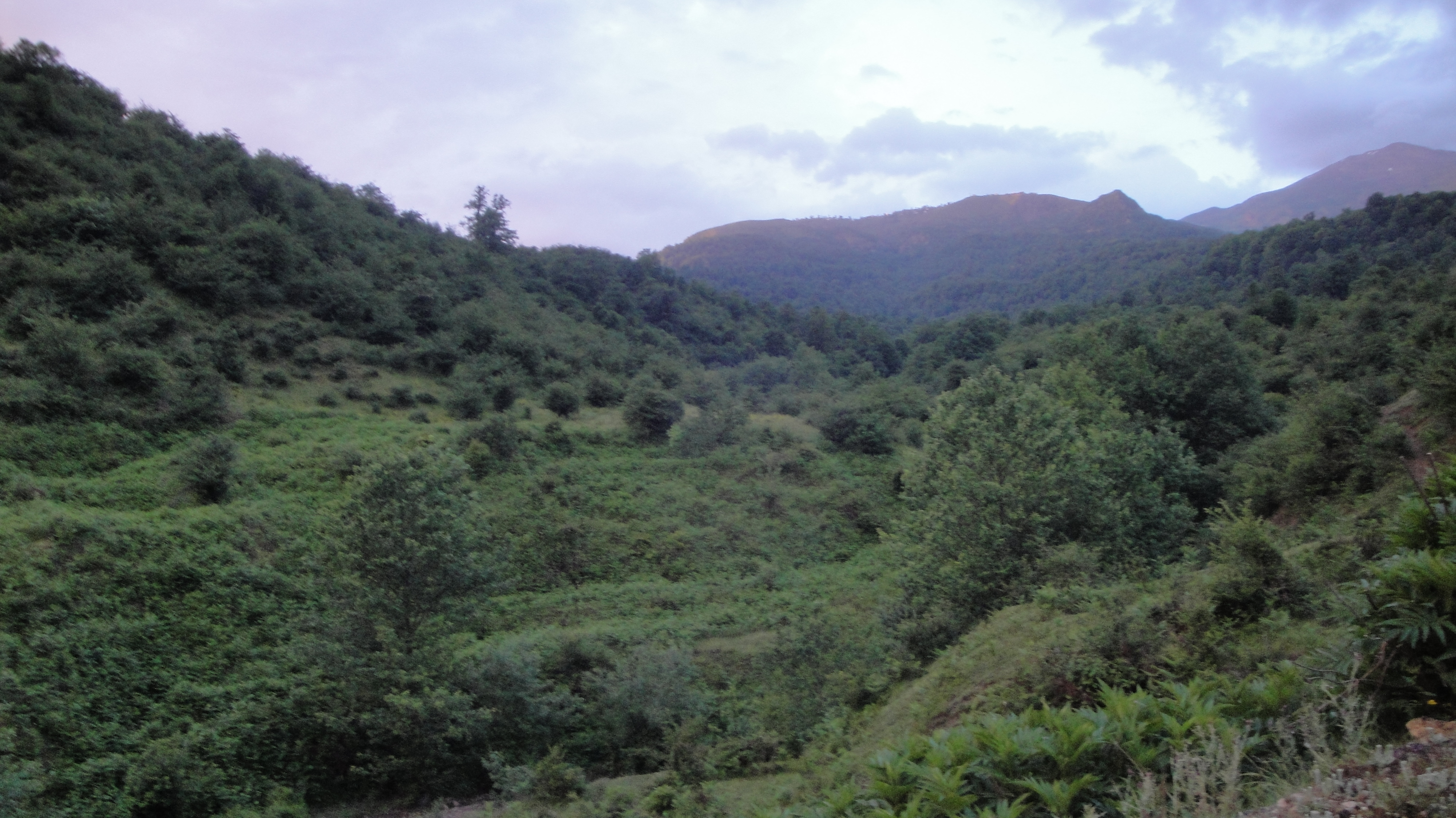
Sangechal

== See also ==
Media related to Amol County at Wikimedia Commons
