= Dabudasht District =

District in Mazandaran province, Iran

Dabudasht District Persian: بخش دابودشت
- District
- Location within Iran
- Coordinates: 36°34′N 52°27′E
- Country: Iran
- Province: Mazandaran
- County: Amol
- Established: 2000
- Capital: Dabudasht

Population (2016)
  - Total: 39,476
- Time zone: UTC+3:30 (IRST)

Dabudasht District (Persian: بخش دابودشت) is in Amol County, Mazandaran province, Iran. Its capital is the city of Dabudasht. (Note: Formerly Darvish Kheyl)

== History ==
In 2012, Dabuy-ye Miyani Rural District was created in the district, and Dasht-e Sar Rural District (Note: Renamed Dasht-e Sar-e Sharqi Rural District) was separated from it in the formation of Dasht-e Sar District.

== Demographics ==
=== Population ===
At the time of the 2006 National Census, the district's population was 74,687 in 19,356 households. The following census in 2011 counted 76,553 people in 22,587 households. The 2016 census measured the population of the district as 39,476 inhabitants in 13,303 households.

=== Administrative divisions ===
Dabudasht District Population
Administrative Divisions	2006	2011	2016
Dabuy-ye Jonubi RD	37,796	38,352	19,077
Dabuy-ye Miyani RD			18,641
Dasht-e Sar RD (Note: Transferred to Dasht-e Sar District and renamed Dasht-e Sar-e Sharqi Rural District)	35,795	37,032	
Dabudasht (city)	1,096	1,169	1,758
Total	74,687	76,553	39,476
RD = Rural District
