= Ahangar Kola =

Ahangar Kola or Ahangar Kala or Ahangarkala (Persian: آهنگركلا) may refer to several places in Mazandaran province, Iran:

- Ahangar Kola, Amol
- Ahangar Kola, Dabudasht, Amol County
- Ahangar Kola-ye Olya, Amol County
- Ahangar Kola-ye Sofla, Amol County
- Ahangar Kola, Babol
- Ahangar Kola, Gatab, Babol County
- Ahangar Kola, Behshahr
- Ahangar Kola, Chalus
- Ahangar Kola, Mahmudabad
- Ahangar Kola, Qaem Shahr
- Ahangar Kola, Nowkand Kola, Qaem Shahr County
- Ahangar Kola, Savadkuh
- Ahangar Kola, Simorgh
