= Baliran =

Village in Mazandaran province, Iran

Baliran Persian: بليران
- Village
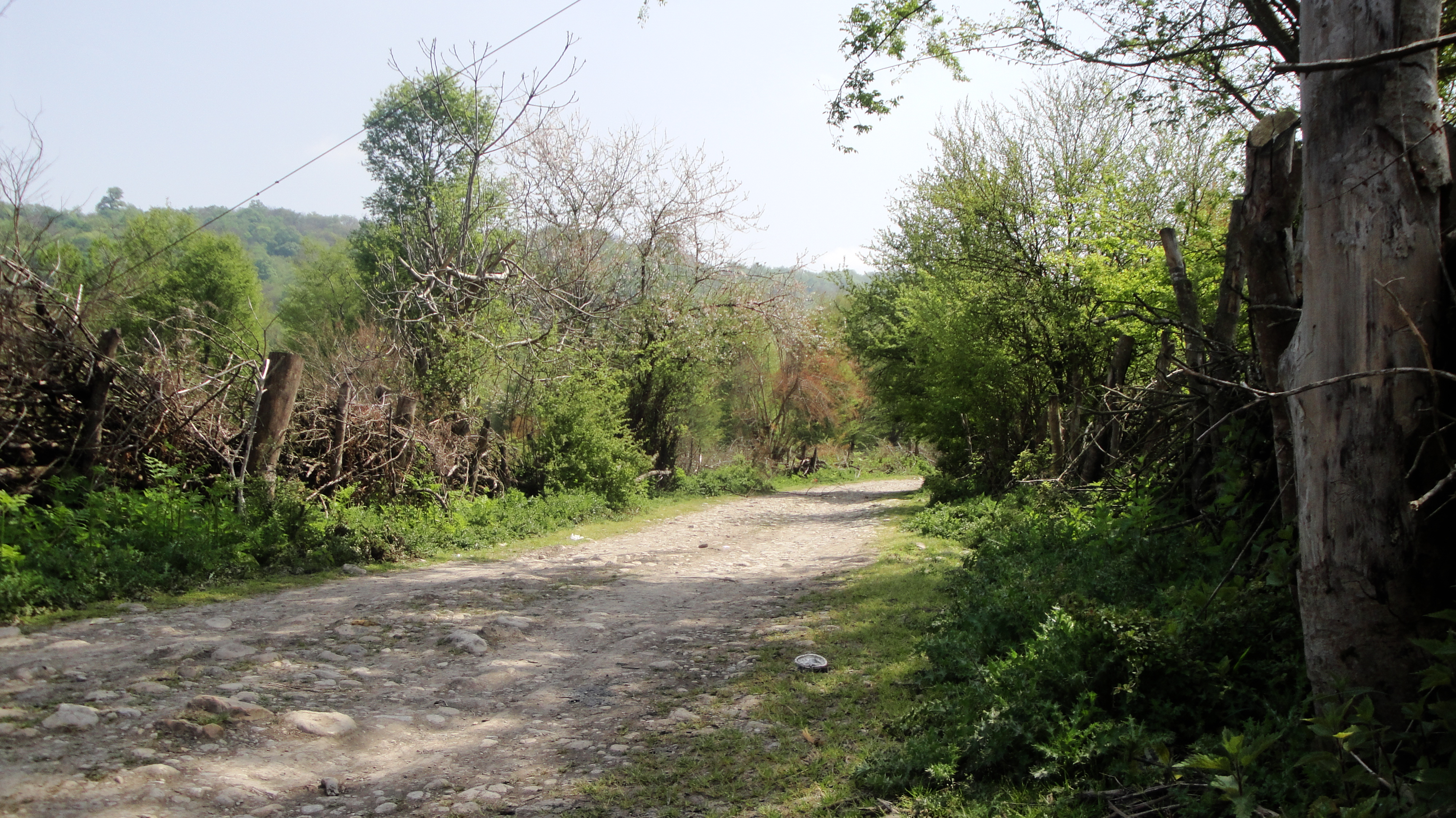
- Hedge in Baliran jungle

- Location within Iran
- Coordinates: 36°21′22″N 52°25′35″E
- Country: Iran
- Province: Mazandaran
- County: Amol
- District: Dasht-e Sar
- Rural District: Dasht-e Sar-e Gharbi

Population (2016)
  - Total: 140
- Time zone: UTC+3:30 (IRST)

Baliran (Persian: بليران) (Note: Also romanized as Baleyran, Baleyrān, and Balīrān) is a village in Dasht-e Sar-e Gharbi Rural District of Dasht-e Sar District in Amol County, Mazandaran province, Iran.

== Demographics ==
=== Population ===
At the time of the 2006 National Census, the village's population was 101 in 25 households, when it was in Dasht-e Sar Rural District (Note: Renamed Dasht-e Sar-e Sharqi Rural District) of Dabudasht District. The following census in 2011 counted 122 people in 38 households. The 2016 census measured the population of the village as 140 people in 50 households, by which time the rural district had been separated from the district in the formation of Dasht-e Sar District and renamed Dasht-e Sar-e Sharqi Rural District. Baliran was transferred to Dasht-e Sar-e Gharbi Rural District created in the new district.

== Geography ==
Baliran is among the touristic villages in Mazandaran province. It is in the northern foothills of the central Alborz mountains in the Hyrcanian forests, with Komdarreh, Zavarak and Shahneh Kola villages to its north. Garmrud river passes through the area from south to north.

Due to some features, such as a river passing through it, and having traditional texture and native architecture, the forest park, Kalchengom pasture, and the Gru and Lalehzar mineral springs, it was introduced as a model tourism area in 2008.

== Agriculture ==
The agricultural products of the village include rice, vegetables, apples, pears, quince and livestock products.

== Gallery ==
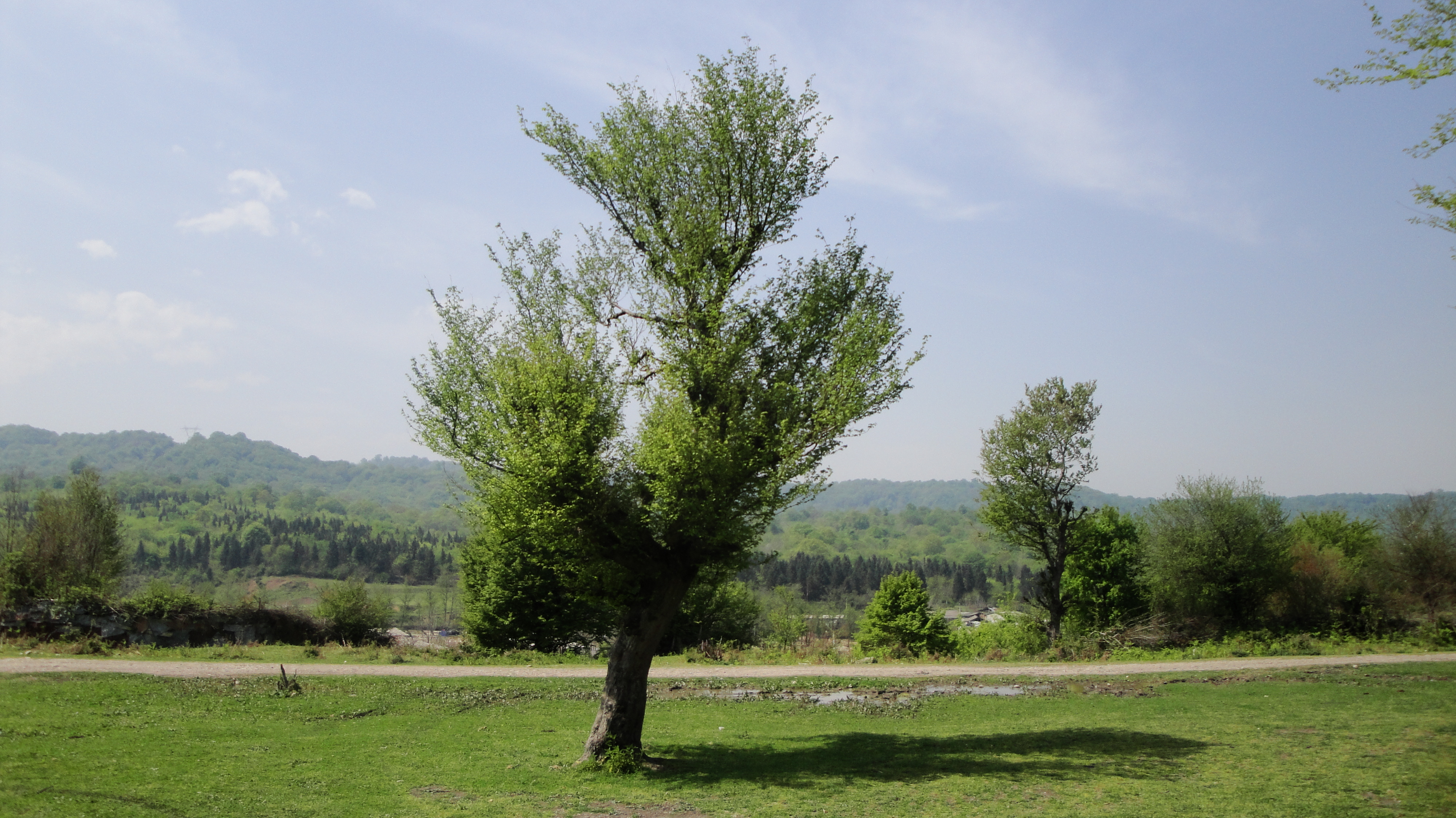
Jungle

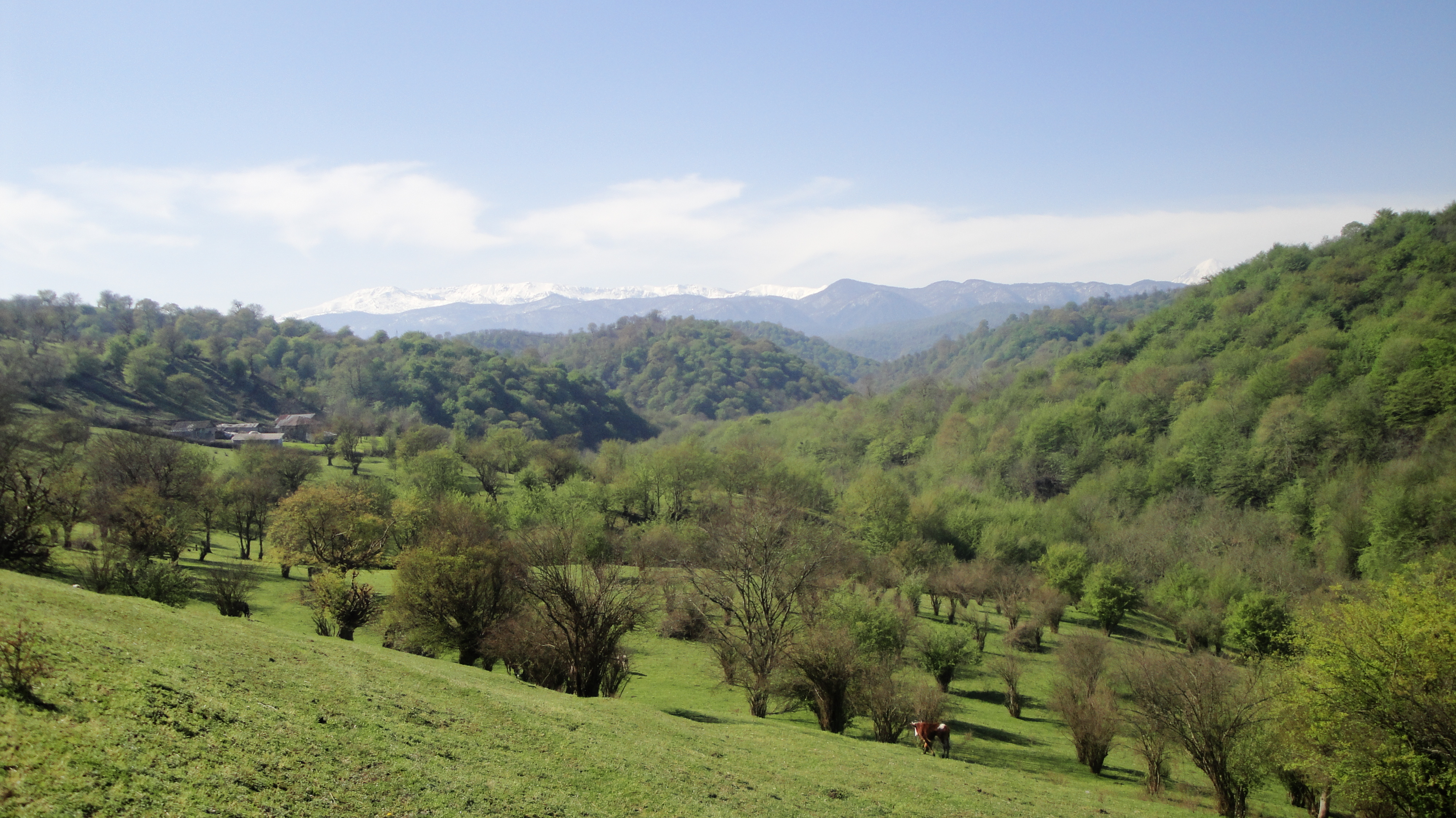
Jungle

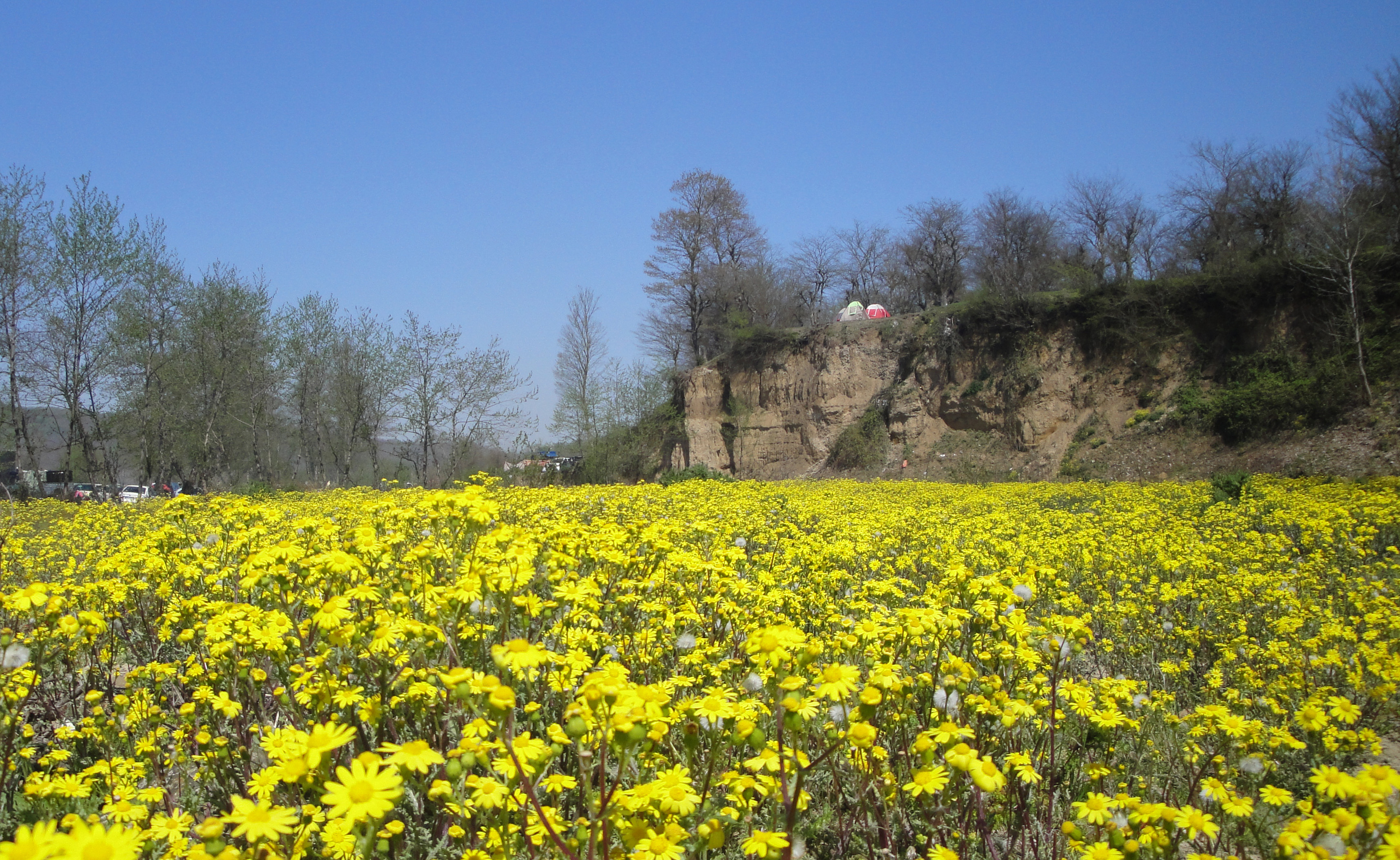
Yellow Flowers and Jungle

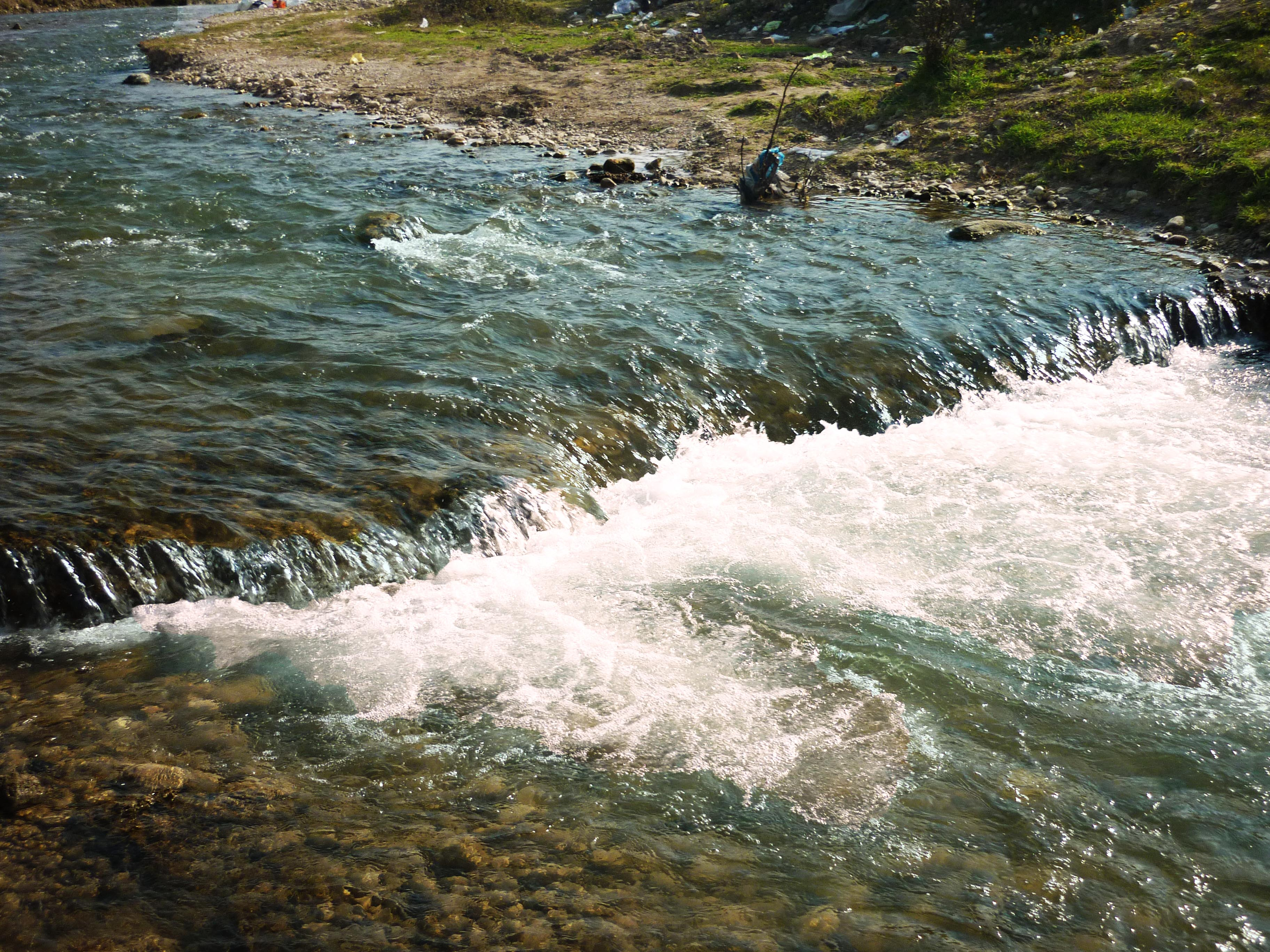
River
