= Kachap =

Kachap (Persian: كچپ), also rendered as Kachab, may refer to:

- Kachap-e Kolva
- Kachap-e Olya
- Kachap-e Sofla
