= Firuz Kola =

Firuz Kola or Firuz Kala (Persian: فيروزكلا) may refer to:

- Firuz Kola-ye Olya (disambiguation)
- Firuz Kola-ye Sofla (disambiguation)
- Firuz Kola-ye Vosta
