= Rostamdar Mahalleh =

Village in Mazandaran province, Iran

Rostamdar Mahalleh Persian: رستم دارمحله
- Village
- Location within Iran
- Country: Iran
- Province: Mazandaran
- County: Amol
- District: Dasht-e Sar
- Rural District: Dasht-e Sar-e Sharqi

Population (2016)
  - Total: Below reporting threshold
- Time zone: UTC+3:30 (IRST)

Rostamdar Mahalleh (Persian: رستم دارمحله) (Note: Also romanized as Rostamdār Maḩalleh; also known as Rostamdārī Maḩalleh) is a village in Dasht-e Sar-e Sharqi Rural District (Note: Formerly Dasht-e Sar Rural District) of Dasht-e Sar District in Amol County, Mazandaran province, Iran.

== Demographics ==
=== Population ===
At the time of the 2006 National Census, the village's population was 18 in four households, when it was in Dasht-e Sar Rural District (Note: Renamed Dasht-e Sar-e Sharqi Rural District) of Dabudasht District. The following censuses in 2011 and 2016 both counted a population below the reporting threshold, by which time the rural district had been separated from the district in the formation of Dasht-e Sar District and renamed Dasht-e Sar-e Sharqi Rural District.
