= Mahdi Kheyl =

Village in Mazandaran province, Iran

Mahdi Kheyl Persian: مهدي خيل
- Village
- Location within Iran
- Coordinates: 36°26′05″N 52°25′58″E
- Country: Iran
- Province: Mazandaran
- County: Amol
- District: Dasht-e Sar
- Rural District: Dasht-e Sar-e Sharqi

Population (2016)
  - Total: 593
- Time zone: UTC+3:30 (IRST)

Mahdi Kheyl (Persian: مهدي خيل) (Note: Also romanized as Mahdī Kheyl) is a village in Dasht-e Sar-e Sharqi Rural District (Note: Formerly Dasht-e Sar Rural District) of Dasht-e Sar District in Amol County, Mazandaran province, Iran.

== Demographics ==
=== Population ===
At the time of the 2006 National Census, the village's population was 926 in 219 households, when it was in Dasht-e Sar Rural District (Note: Renamed Dasht-e Sar-e Sharqi Rural District) of Dabudasht District. The following census in 2011 counted 945 people in 267 households. The 2016 census measured the population of the village as 916 people in 294 households, by which time the rural district had been separated from the district in the formation of Dasht-e Sar District and renamed Dasht-e Sar-e Sharqi Rural District.
