= Tir Kola =

Tir Kola or Tir Kala (Persian: تيركلا) may refer to:

- Tir Kola, Amol
- Tir Kola, Babol
- Tir Kola, Sari
