= Tamask =

Tamask or Tamesk (Persian: تمسك) may refer to:

- Tamesk, Amol
- Tamask, Dabudasht, Amol County
