= Shad Mahal =

Village in Mazandaran province, Iran

Shad Mahal Persian: شادمحل
- Village
- Location within Iran
- Country: Iran
- Province: Mazandaran
- County: Amol
- District: Dasht-e Sar
- Rural District: Dasht-e Sar-e Gharbi

Population (2016)
  - Total: 5,818
- Time zone: UTC+3:30 (IRST)

Shad Mahal (Persian: شادمحل) (Note: Also romanized as Shād Maḩal) is a village in Dasht-e Sar-e Gharbi Rural District of Dasht-e Sar District in Amol County, Mazandaran province, Iran.

== Demographics ==
=== Population ===
At the time of the 2006 National Census, the village's population was 4,065 in 1,095 households, when it was in Dasht-e Sar Rural District (Note: Renamed Dasht-e Sar-e Sharqi Rural District) of Dabudasht District. The following census in 2011 counted 4,616 people in 1,387 households. The 2016 census measured the population of the village as 5,818 people in 1,857 households, by which time the rural district had been separated from the district in the formation of Dasht-e Sar District and renamed Dasht-e Sar-e Sharqi Rural District. Shad Mahal was transferred to Dasht-e Sar-e Gharbi Rural District created in the new district, and was its most populous village.
