= Buran, Mazandaran =

Village in Mazandaran province, Iran

Buran Persian: بوران
- Village
- Location within Iran
- Coordinates: 36°27′52″N 52°24′08″E
- Country: Iran
- Province: Mazandaran
- County: Amol
- District: Dasht-e Sar
- Rural District: Dasht-e Sar-e Gharbi

Population (2016)
  - Total: 3,245
- Time zone: UTC+3:30 (IRST)

Buran (Persian: بوران) (Note: Also romanized as Būrān) is a village in Dasht-e Sar-e Gharbi Rural District of Dasht-e Sar District in Amol County, Mazandaran province, Iran.

== Demographics ==
=== Population ===
At the time of the 2006 National Census, the village's population was 2,869 in 750 households, when it was in Dasht-e Sar Rural District (Note: Renamed Dasht-e Sar-e Sharqi Rural District) of Dabudasht District. The following census in 2011 counted 2,932 people in 846 households. The 2016 census measured the population of the village as 3,245 people in 1,057 households, by which time the rural district had been separated from the district in the formation of Dasht-e Sar District and renamed Dasht-e Sar-e Sharqi Rural District. Buran was transferred to Dasht-e Sar-e Gharbi Rural District created in the new district.
