= Qalyan Kola =

Village in Mazandaran province, Iran

Qalyan Kola Persian: قليان كلا
- Village
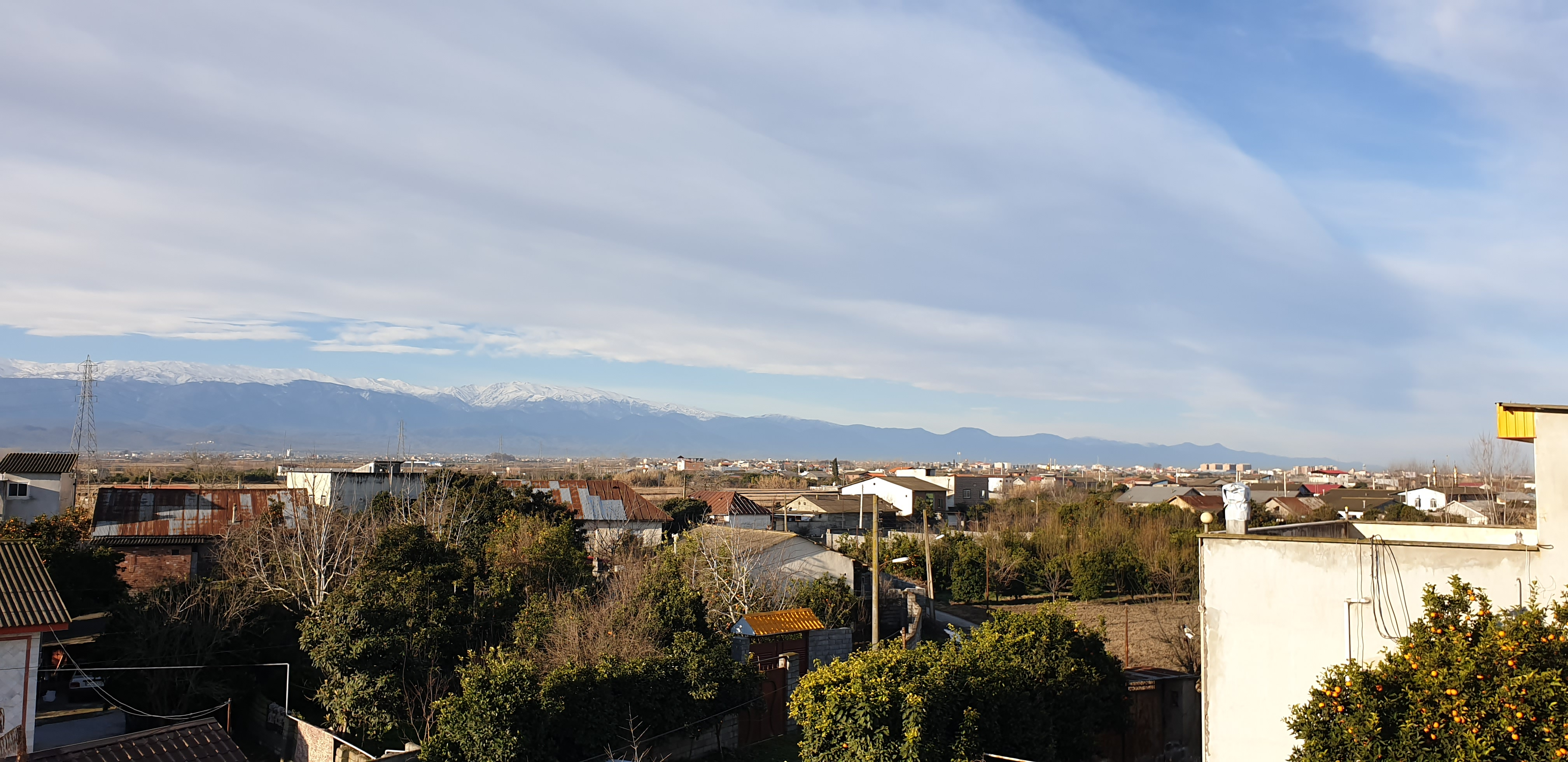
- Picture of Qalyan Kola.

- Location within Iran
- Coordinates: 36°28′49″N 52°29′05″E
- Country: Iran
- Province: Mazandaran
- County: Amol
- District: Dasht-e Sar
- Rural District: Dasht-e Sar-e Sharqi

Population (2016)
  - Total: 243
- Time zone: UTC+3:30 (IRST)

Qalyan Kola (Persian: قليان كلا) (Note: Also romanized as Qalyān Kolā; also known as Qalyān Kolā-ye ‘Olyā) is a village in Dasht-e Sar-e Sharqi Rural District (Note: Formerly Dasht-e Sar Rural District) of Dasht-e Sar District in Amol County, Mazandaran province, Iran.

== Demographics ==
=== Population ===
At the time of the 2006 National Census, the village's population was 300 in 67 households, when it was in Dasht-e Sar Rural District (Note: Renamed Dasht-e Sar-e Sharqi Rural District) of Dabudasht District. The following census in 2011 counted 228 people in 61 households. The 2016 census measured the population of the village as 243 people in 73 households, by which time the rural district had been separated from the district in the formation of Dasht-e Sar District and renamed Dasht-e Sar-e Sharqi Rural District.
