= Davud Kola =

Village in Mazandaran province, Iran

Davud Kola Persian: داودكلا
- Village
- Location within Iran
- Country: Iran
- Province: Mazandaran
- County: Amol
- District: Dasht-e Sar
- Rural District: Dasht-e Sar-e Sharqi

Population (2016)
  - Total: 444
- Time zone: UTC+3:30 (IRST)

Davud Kola (Persian: داودكلا) (Note: Also romanized as Dāvūd Kolā; also known as Dāvūd Kolā-ye Pā’īn) is a village in Dasht-e Sar-e Sharqi Rural District (Note: Formerly Dasht-e Sar Rural District) of Dasht-e Sar District in Amol County, Mazandaran province, Iran.

== Demographics ==
=== Population ===
At the time of the 2006 National Census, the village's population was 457 in 118 households, when it was in Dasht-e Sar Rural District (Note: Renamed Dasht-e Sar-e Sharqi Rural District) of Dabudasht District. The following census in 2011 counted 473 people in 136 households. The 2016 census measured the population of the village as 444 people in 148 households, by which time the rural district had been separated from the district in the formation of Dasht-e Sar District and renamed Dasht-e Sar-e Sharqi Rural District.

== Overview ==
This village has a tourist area of Tooneh Keshun which has a forest texture with an area of about 5,000 square meters and has a history of 500 years. Dehkhoda primary school was established in this village in 1348 and is still used. The village has two parts, the lower part of Davudkala which is located in the northern part of the village and the upper area of Davudkola which is the southern part. The area around the village consists of agricultural lands.
