= Allah Kaj =

Village in Mazandaran province, Iran

Allah Kaj Persian: اله كاج
- Village
- Country: Iran
- Province: Mazandaran
- County: Amol
- District: Dasht-e Sar
- Rural District: Dasht-e Sar-e Sharqi

Population (2016)
  - Total: 98
- Time zone: UTC+3:30 (IRST)

Allah Kaj (Persian: اله كاج) (Note: Also romanized as Allah Kāj) is a village in Dasht-e Sar-e Sharqi Rural District (Note: Formerly Dasht-e Sar Rural District) of Dasht-e Sar District in Amol County, Mazandaran province, Iran.

== Demographics ==
=== Population ===
At the time of the 2006 National Census, the village's population was 96 in 25 households, when it was in Dasht-e Sar Rural District (Note: Renamed Dasht-e Sar-e Sharqi Rural District) of Dabudasht District. The following census in 2011 counted 98 people in 28 households. The 2016 census measured the population of the village as 98 people in 30 households, by which time the rural district had been separated from the district in the formation of Dasht-e Sar District and renamed Dasht-e Sar-e Sharqi Rural District.
