= Kabud Kola =

Kabud Kola (Persian: كبودكلا) may refer to:

- Kabud Kola, Amol
- Kabud Kola, Babol
