= Baghban Kola =

Baghban Kola (Persian: باغبان كلا) may refer to:

- Baghban Kola, Amol
- Baghban Kola, Nur
- Baghban Kola, Baladeh, Nur County
