= Gol Mazar =

Village in Mazandaran province, Iran

Gol Mazar Persian: گلمزار
- Village
- Location within Iran
- Coordinates: 36°25′10″N 52°29′46″E
- Country: Iran
- Province: Mazandaran
- County: Amol
- District: Dasht-e Sar
- Rural District: Dasht-e Sar-e Sharqi

Population (2016)
  - Total: 76
- Time zone: UTC+3:30 (IRST)

Gol Mazar (Persian: گلمزار) (Note: Also romanized as Gol Mazār) is a village in Dasht-e Sar-e Sharqi Rural District (Note: Formerly Dasht-e Sar Rural District) of Dasht-e Sar District in Amol County, Mazandaran province, Iran.

== Demographics ==
=== Population ===
At the time of the 2006 National Census, the village's population was 89 in 21 households, when it was in Dasht-e Sar Rural District (Note: Renamed Dasht-e Sar-e Sharqi Rural District) of Dabudasht District. The following census in 2011 counted 65 people in 18 households. The 2016 census measured the population of the village as 76 people in 22 households, by which time the rural district had been separated from the district in the formation of Dasht-e Sar District and renamed Dasht-e Sar-e Sharqi Rural District.
