= Harun Kola =

Neighborhood in Mazandaran province, Iran

Harun Kola Persian: هارون كلا
- Neighborhood
- Location within Iran
- Coordinates: 36°27′29″N 52°26′48″E
- Country: Iran
- Province: Mazandaran
- County: Amol
- District: Dasht-e Sar
- City: Ejbar Kola

Population (2011)
  - Total: 1,018
- Time zone: UTC+3:30 (IRST)

Harun Kola (Persian: هارون كلا) (Note: Also romanized as Hārūn Kolā; also known as Hārūn Kolā-ye Bālā and Hārūn Kolā-ye ‘Olyā) is a neighborhood in the city of Babakan (Note: Formerly known as Ejbar Kola) in Dasht-e Sar District of Amol County, Mazandaran province, Iran.

== Demographics ==
=== Population ===
At the time of the 2006 National Census, Harun Kola's population was 937 in 255 households, when it was a village in Dasht-e Sar Rural District (Note: Renamed Dasht-e Sar-e Sharqi Rural District) of Dabudasht District. The following census in 2011 counted 1,018 people in 295 households.

In 2012, the village of Ejbar Kola was merged with the villages of Harun Kola, Khuni Sar, Nafar Kheyl, and Najjar Mahalleh to become a larger village of the same name. Ejbar Kola was converted to a city in 2017 and renamed Babakan in 2019.
