= Khuni Sar =

Neighborhood in Mazandaran province, Iran

Khuni Sar Persian: خونی سر
- Neighborhood
- Location within Iran
- Coordinates: 36°26′55″N 52°28′04″E
- Country: Iran
- Province: Mazandaran
- County: Amol
- District: Dasht-e Sar
- City: Ejbar Kola

Population (2011)
  - Total: 248
- Time zone: UTC+3:30 (IRST)

Khuni Sar (Persian: خونی سر) (Note: Also romanized as Khūnī Sar; also known as Khāneh Sarā) is a neighborhood in the city of Babakan (Note: Formerly known as Ejbar Kola) in Dasht-e Sar District of Amol County, Mazandaran province, Iran.

== Demographics ==
=== Population ===
At the time of the 2006 National Census, Khuni Sar's population was 256 in 62 households, when it was a village in Dasht-e Sar Rural District (Note: Renamed Dasht-e Sar-e Sharqi Rural District) of Dabudasht District. The following census in 2011 counted 248 people in 67 households.

In 2012, the village of Ejbar Kola was merged with the villages of Harun Kola, Khuni Sar, Nafar Kheyl, and Najjar Mahalleh to become a larger village of the same name. Ejbar Kola was converted to a city in 2017 and renamed Babakan in 2019.
