= Chang Mian =

Village in Mazandaran province, Iran

Chang Mian Persian: چنگ ميان
- Village
- Location within Iran
- Coordinates: 36°24′33″N 52°29′35″E
- Country: Iran
- Province: Mazandaran
- County: Amol
- District: Dasht-e Sar
- Rural District: Dasht-e Sar-e Sharqi

Population (2016)
  - Total: 355
- Time zone: UTC+3:30 (IRST)

Chang Mian (Persian: چنگ ميان) (Note: Also romanized as Chang Mīān; also known as Chang Mīān-e Pā’īn) is a village in Dasht-e Sar-e Sharqi Rural District (Note: Formerly Dasht-e Sar Rural District) of Dasht-e Sar District in Amol County, Mazandaran province, Iran.

== Demographics ==
=== Population ===
At the time of the 2006 National Census, the village's population was 443 in 111 households, when it was in Dasht-e Sar Rural District (Note: Renamed Dasht-e Sar-e Sharqi Rural District) of Dabudasht District. The following census in 2011 counted 370 people in 104 households. The 2016 census measured the population of the village as 355 people in 121 households, by which time the rural district had been separated from the district in the formation of Dasht-e Sar District and renamed Dasht-e Sar-e Sharqi Rural District.
