= Hendu Kola =

Village in Mazandaran province, Iran

Hendu Kola Persian: هندوكلا
- Village
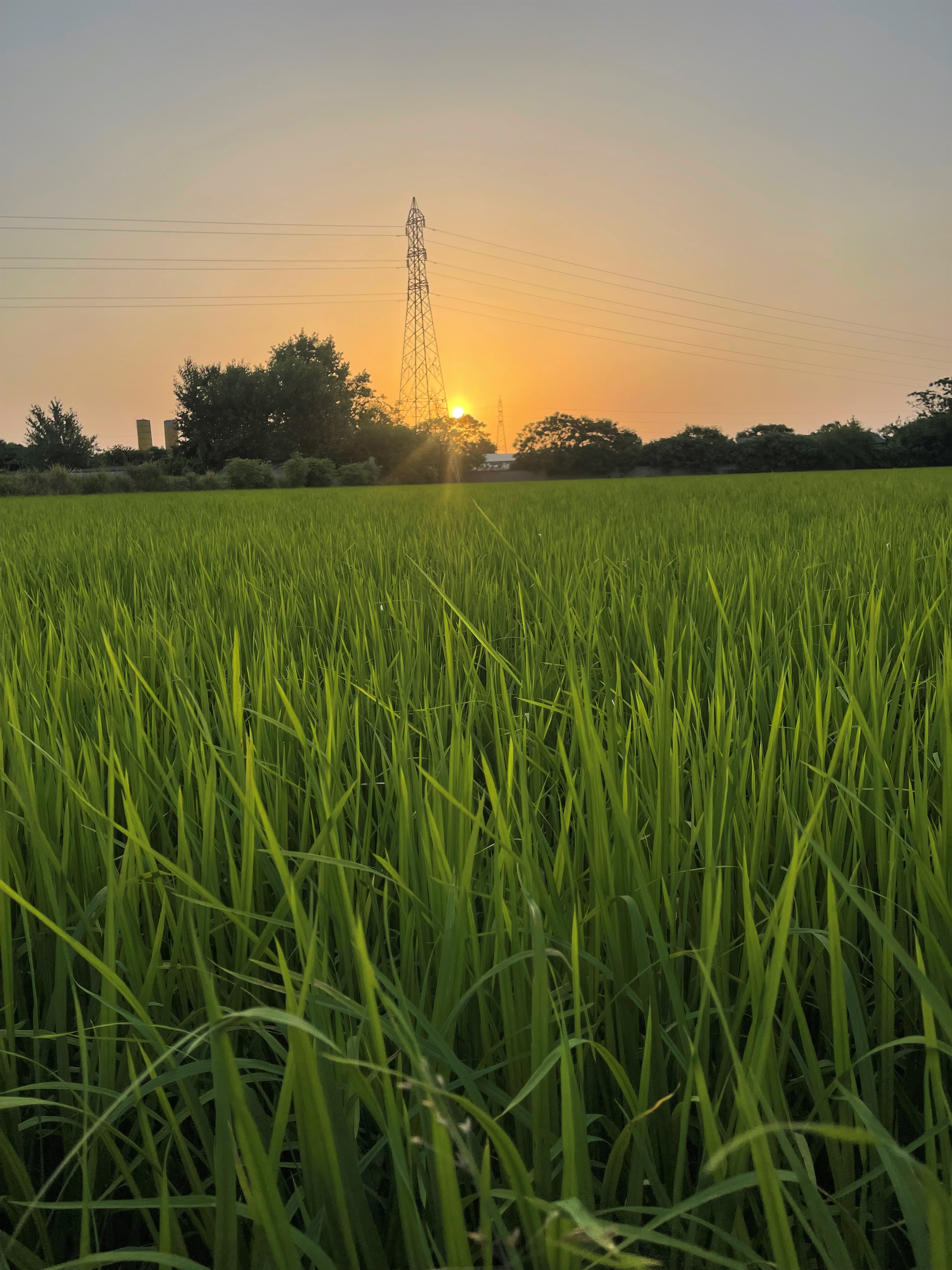
- Rice paddy in the village of Hendu Kola

- Location within Iran
- Coordinates: 36°28′01″N 52°26′03″E
- Country: Iran
- Province: Mazandaran
- County: Amol
- District: Dasht-e Sar
- Rural District: Dasht-e Sar-e Gharbi

Population (2016)
  - Total: 1,416
- Time zone: UTC+3:30 (IRST)

Hendu Kola (Persian: هندوكلا) (Note: Also romanized as Hendū Kolā) is a village in Dasht-e Sar-e Gharbi Rural District of Dasht-e Sar District in Amol County, Mazandaran province, Iran.

== Demographics ==
=== Population ===
At the time of the 2006 National Census, the village's population was 1,457 in 391 households, when it was in Dasht-e Sar Rural District (Note: Renamed Dasht-e Sar-e Sharqi Rural District) of Dabudasht District. The following census in 2011 counted 1,387 people in 417 households. The 2016 census measured the population of the village as 1,416 people in 475 households, by which time the rural district had been separated from the district in the formation of Dasht-e Sar District and renamed Dasht-e Sar-e Sharqi Rural District. Hendu Kola was transferred to Dasht-e Sar-e Gharbi Rural District created in the new district.
