= Moallem Kola, Amol =

Village in Mazandaran province, Iran

Moallem Kola Persian: معلم كلا
- Village
- Location within Iran
- Coordinates: 36°24′35″N 52°24′31″E
- Country: Iran
- Province: Mazandaran
- County: Amol
- District: Dasht-e Sar
- Rural District: Dasht-e Sar-e Gharbi

Population (2016)
  - Total: 967
- Time zone: UTC+3:30 (IRST)

Moallem Kola (Persian: معلم كلا) (Note: Also romanized as Mo‘allem Kolā) is a village in Dasht-e Sar-e Gharbi Rural District of Dasht-e Sar District in Amol County, Mazandaran province, Iran.

== Demographics ==
=== Population ===
At the time of the 2006 National Census, the village's population was 964 in 236 households, when it was in Dasht-e Sar Rural District (Note: Renamed Dasht-e Sar-e Sharqi Rural District) of Dabudasht District. The following census in 2011 counted 1,048 people in 277 households. The 2016 census measured the population of the village as 967 people in 309 households, by which time the rural district had been separated from the district in the formation of Dasht-e Sar District and renamed Dasht-e Sar-e Sharqi Rural District. Moallem Kola was transferred to Dasht-e Sar-e Gharbi Rural District created in the new district.
