= Salar Mahalleh =

Village in Mazandaran province, Iran

Salar Mahalleh Persian: سالارمحله
- Village
- Location within Iran
- Coordinates: 36°28′12″N 52°25′09″E
- Country: Iran
- Province: Mazandaran
- County: Amol
- District: Dasht-e Sar
- Rural District: Dasht-e Sar-e Gharbi

Population (2016)
  - Total: 482
- Time zone: UTC+3:30 (IRST)

Salar Mahalleh (Persian: سالارمحله) (Note: Also romanized as Sālār Maḩalleh) is a village in Dasht-e Sar-e Gharbi Rural District of Dasht-e Sar District in Amol County, Mazandaran province, Iran.

== Demographics ==
=== Population ===
At the time of the 2006 National Census, the village's population was 476 in 113 households, when it was in Dasht-e Sar Rural District (Note: Renamed Dasht-e Sar-e Sharqi Rural District) of Dabudasht District. The following census in 2011 counted 526 people in 139 households. The 2016 census measured the population of the village as 482 people in 144 households, by which time the rural district had been separated from the district in the formation of Dasht-e Sar District and renamed Dasht-e Sar-e Sharqi Rural District. Salar Mahalleh was transferred to Dasht-e Sar-e Gharbi Rural District created in the new district.
