= Pasha Kola, Dasht-e Sar =

Village in Mazandaran province, Iran

Pasha Kola Persian: پاشاكلا
- Village
- Location within Iran
- Coordinates: 36°25′31″N 52°25′13″E
- Country: Iran
- Province: Mazandaran
- County: Amol
- District: Dasht-e Sar
- Rural District: Dasht-e Sar-e Gharbi

Population (2016)
  - Total: 1,290
- Time zone: UTC+3:30 (IRST)

Pasha Kola (Persian: پاشاكلا) (Note: Also romanized as Pāshā Kalā and Pāshā Kolā) is a village in Dasht-e Sar-e Gharbi Rural District of Dasht-e Sar District in Amol County, Mazandaran province, Iran.

== Demographics ==
=== Population ===
At the time of the 2006 National Census, the village's population was 1,399 in 370 households, when it was in Dasht-e Sar Rural District (Note: Renamed Dasht-e Sar-e Sharqi Rural District) of Dabudasht District. The following census in 2011 counted 1,326 people in 390 households. The 2016 census measured the population of the village as 1,290 people in 443 households, by which time the rural district had been separated from the district in the formation of Dasht-e Sar District and renamed Dasht-e Sar-e Sharqi Rural District. Pasha Kola was transferred to Dasht-e Sar-e Gharbi Rural District created in the new district.
