= Kharman Kola =

Village in Mazandaran province, Iran

Kharman Kola Persian: خرمن كلا
- Village
- Location within Iran
- Coordinates: 36°25′02″N 52°27′12″E
- Country: Iran
- Province: Mazandaran
- County: Amol
- District: Dasht-e Sar
- Rural District: Dasht-e Sar-e Sharqi

Population (2016)
  - Total: 234
- Time zone: UTC+3:30 (IRST)

Kharman Kola (Persian: خرمن كلا) (Note: Also romanized as Kharman Kolā) is a village in Dasht-e Sar-e Sharqi Rural District (Note: Formerly Dasht-e Sar Rural District) of Dasht-e Sar District in Amol County, Mazandaran province, Iran.

== Demographics ==
=== Population ===
At the time of the 2006 National Census, the village's population was 194 in 49 households, when it was in Dasht-e Sar Rural District (Note: Renamed Dasht-e Sar-e Sharqi Rural District) of Dabudasht District. The following census in 2011 counted 188 people in 53 households. The 2016 census measured the population of the village as 234 people in 79 households, by which time the rural district had been separated from the district in the formation of Dasht-e Sar District and renamed Dasht-e Sar-e Sharqi Rural District.
