= Mileh =

Village in Mazandaran province, Iran

Mileh Persian: ميله
- Village
- Location within Iran
- Coordinates: 36°25′06″N 52°26′21″E
- Country: Iran
- Province: Mazandaran
- County: Amol
- District: Dasht-e Sar
- Rural District: Dasht-e Sar-e Sharqi

Population (2016)
  - Total: 817
- Time zone: UTC+3:30 (IRST)

Mileh (Persian: ميله) (Note: Also romanized as Mīleh) is a village in Dasht-e Sar-e Sharqi Rural District (Note: Formerly Dasht-e Sar Rural District) of Dasht-e Sar District in Amol County, Mazandaran province, Iran.

== Demographics ==
=== Population ===
At the time of the 2006 National Census, the village's population was 878 in 231 households, when it was in Dasht-e Sar Rural District (Note: Renamed Dasht-e Sar-e Sharqi Rural District) of Dabudasht District. The following census in 2011 counted 881 people in 258 households. The 2016 census measured the population of the village as 817 people in 276 households, by which time the rural district had been separated from the district in the formation of Dasht-e Sar District and renamed Dasht-e Sar-e Sharqi Rural District.

== Overview ==
During the Abbasid period, Mileh served as a garrison town. It was the first stage on the road heading east from Amol to Sari, with the town of Barji being the next one.
