= Komdarreh =

Village in Mazandaran province, Iran

Komdarreh Persian: كمدره
- Village
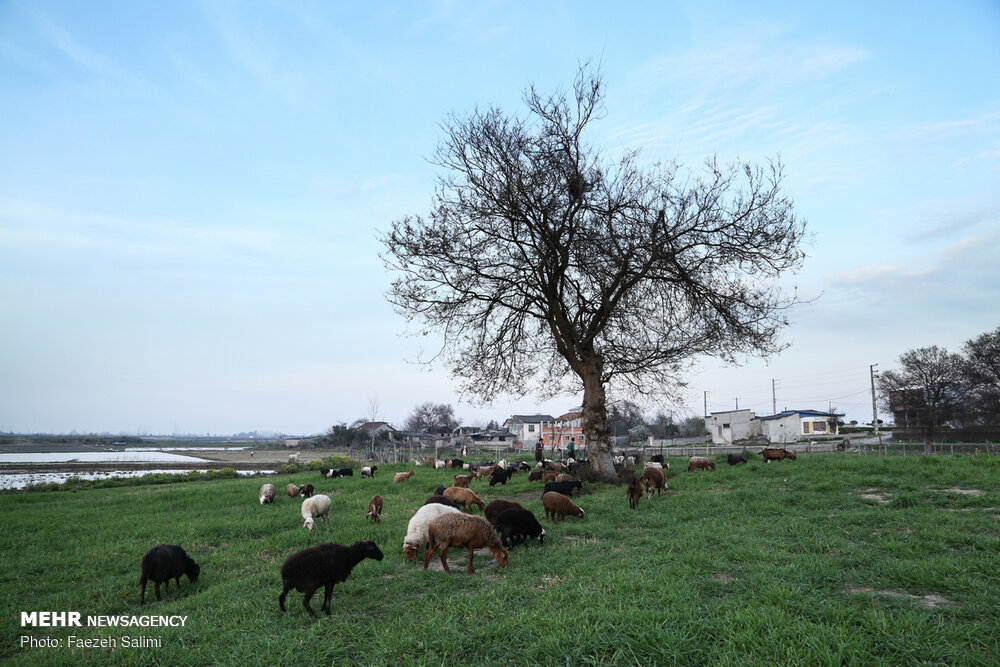
- Landscape in the village of Komdarreh

- Location within Iran
- Coordinates: 36°24′09″N 52°25′55″E
- Country: Iran
- Province: Mazandaran
- County: Amol
- District: Dasht-e Sar
- Rural District: Dasht-e Sar-e Gharbi

Population (2016)
  - Total: 2,070
- Time zone: UTC+3:30 (IRST)

Komdarreh (Persian: كمدره) (Note: Mazandarani: کیمره) is a village in Dasht-e Sar-e Gharbi Rural District of Dasht-e Sar District in Amol County, Mazandaran province, Iran.

== Demographics ==
=== Population ===
At the time of the 2006 National Census, the village's population was 1,924 in 517 households, when it was in Dasht-e Sar Rural District (Note: Renamed Dasht-e Sar-e Sharqi Rural District) of Dabudasht District. The following census in 2011 counted 2,018 people in 609 households. The 2016 census measured the population of the village as 2,070 people in 694 households, by which time the rural district had been separated from the district in the formation of Dasht-e Sar District and renamed Dasht-e Sar-e Sharqi Rural District. Komdarreh was transferred to Dasht-e Sar-e Gharbi Rural District created in the new district.

== See also ==
Media related to Komdarreh at Wikimedia Commons
