= Firuz Kola-ye Olya, Amol =

Village in Mazandaran province, Iran

Firuz Kola-ye Olya Persian: فيروزكلاعليا
- Village
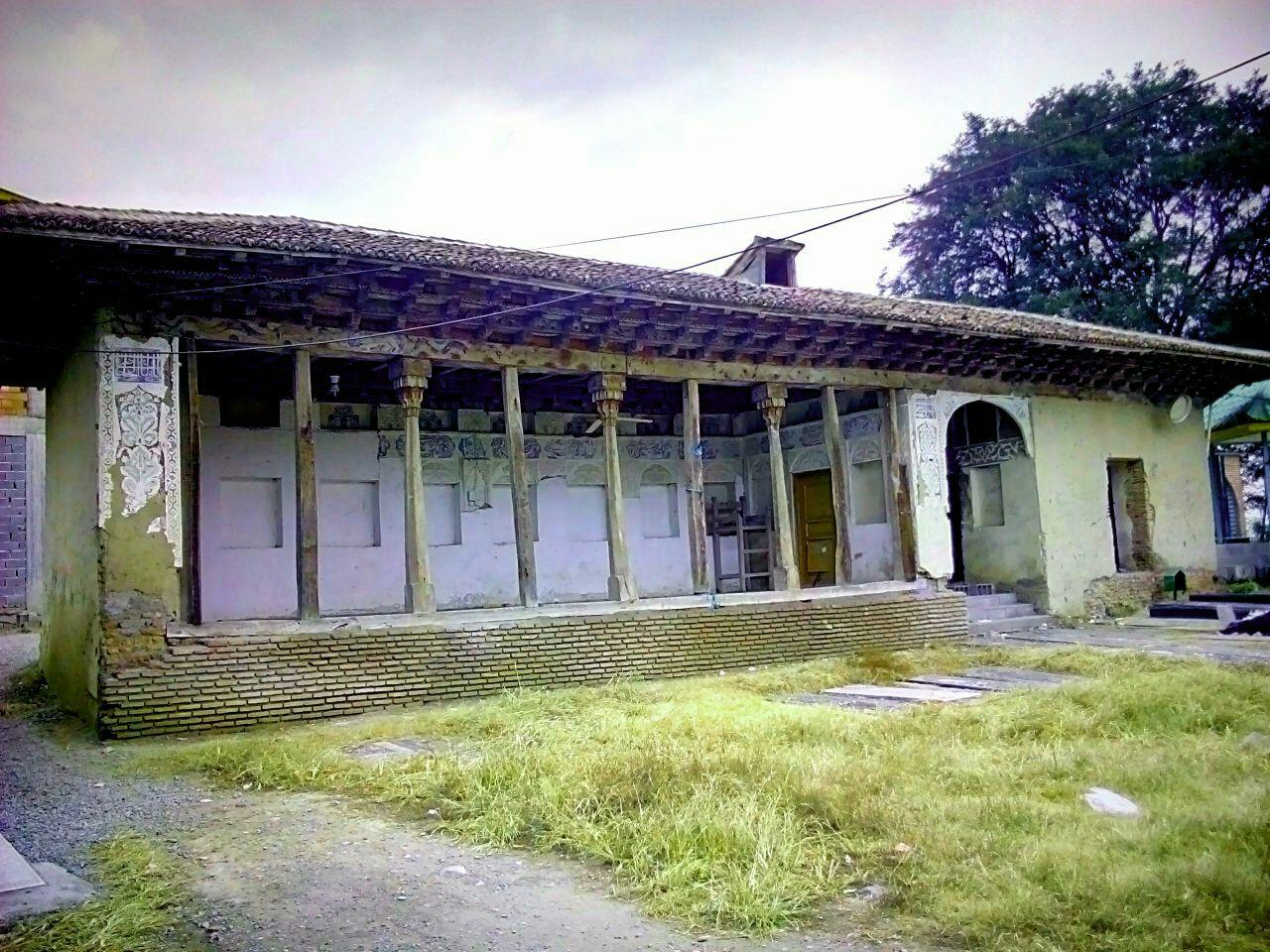
- Building in the village of Firuz Kola-ye Olya

- Location within Iran
- Coordinates: 36°26′00″N 52°24′38″E
- Country: Iran
- Province: Mazandaran
- County: Amol
- District: Dasht-e Sar
- Rural District: Dasht-e Sar-e Gharbi

Population (2016)
  - Total: 413
- Time zone: UTC+3:30 (IRST)

Firuz Kola-ye Olya (Persian: فيروزكلاعليا) (Note: Also romanized as Fīrūz Kolā-ye ‘Olyā) is a village in Dasht-e Sar-e Gharbi Rural District of Dasht-e Sar District in Amol County, Mazandaran province, Iran.

== Demographics ==
=== Population ===
At the time of the 2006 National Census, the village's population was 371 in 101 households, when it was in Dasht-e Sar Rural District (Note: Renamed Dasht-e Sar-e Sharqi Rural District) of Dabudasht District. The following census in 2011 counted 349 people in 108 households. The 2016 census measured the population of the village as 413 people in 137 households, by which time the rural district had been separated from the district in the formation of Dasht-e Sar District and renamed Dasht-e Sar-e Sharqi Rural District. Firuz Kola-ye Olya was transferred to Dasht-e Sar-e Gharbi Rural District created in the new district.
