= Dasht-e Sar-e Gharbi Rural District =

Rural district in Mazandaran province, Iran

Dasht-e Sar-e Gharbi Rural District Persian: دهستان دشت ‌سر غربی
- Rural District
- Location within Iran
- Coordinates: 36°20′N 52°25′E
- Country: Iran
- Province: Mazandaran
- County: Amol
- District: Dasht-e Sar
- Established: 2012
- Capital: Firuz Kola-ye Vosta

Population (2016)
  - Total: 18,742
- Time zone: UTC+3:30 (IRST)

Dasht-e Sar-e Gharbi Rural District (Persian: دهستان دشت ‌سر غربی) is in Dasht-e Sar District of Amol County, Mazandaran province, Iran. Its capital is the village of Firuz Kola-ye Vosta.

== History ==
In 2012, Dasht-e Sar Rural District (Note: Renamed Dasht-e Sar-e Sharqi Rural District) was separated from Dabudasht District in the formation of Dasht-e Sar District, and Dasht-e Sar-e Gharbi Rural District was established in the new district.

== Demographics ==
=== Population ===
The 2016 census measured the population of the rural district as 18,742 in 6,168 households. The most populous of its 14 villages was Shad Mahal, with 5,818 people.

=== Other villages in the rural district ===
- Baliran
- Buran
- Firuz Kola-ye Olya
- Firuz Kola-ye Sofla
- Hendu Kola
- Komdarreh
- Moallem Kola
- Mohammadabad
- Pasha Kola
- Salar Mahalleh
- Shahneh Kola
- Zavarak
