= Ahangar Kola, Dasht-e Sar =

Village in Mazandaran province, Iran

Ahangar Kola Persian: اهنگركلا
- Village
- Location within Iran
- Coordinates: 36°23′23″N 52°29′24″E
- Country: Iran
- Province: Mazandaran
- County: Amol
- District: Dasht-e Sar
- Rural District: Dasht-e Sar-e Sharqi

Population (2016)
  - Total: 1,741
- Time zone: UTC+3:30 (IRST)

Ahangar Kola (Persian: اهنگركلا) (Note: Also romanized as Āhangar Kolā) is a village in Dasht-e Sar-e Sharqi Rural District (Note: Formerly Dasht-e Sar Rural District) of Dasht-e Sar District in Amol County, Mazandaran province, Iran.

== Demographics ==
=== Population ===
At the time of the 2006 National Census, the village's population was 1,603 in 375 households, when it was in Dasht-e Sar Rural District (Note: Renamed Dasht-e Sar-e Sharqi Rural District) of Dabudasht District. The following census in 2011 counted 1,758 people in 467 households. The 2016 census measured the population of the village as 1,741 people in 586 households, by which time the rural district had been separated from the district in the formation of Dasht-e Sar District and renamed Dasht-e Sar-e Sharqi Rural District.
