= Tir Kola, Amol =

Village in Mazandaran province, Iran

Tir Kola Persian: تيركلا
- Village
- Location within Iran
- Coordinates: 36°25′07″N 52°27′44″E
- Country: Iran
- Province: Mazandaran
- County: Amol
- District: Dasht-e Sar
- Rural District: Dasht-e Sar-e Sharqi

Population (2016)
  - Total: 414
- Time zone: UTC+3:30 (IRST)

Tir Kola (Persian: تيركلا) (Note: Also romanized as Tīr Kolā) is a village in Dasht-e Sar-e Sharqi Rural District (Note: Formerly Dasht-e Sar Rural District) of Dasht-e Sar District in Amol County, Mazandaran province, Iran.

== Demographics ==
=== Population ===
At the time of the 2006 National Census, the village's population was 267 in 71 households, when it was in Dasht-e Sar Rural District (Note: Renamed Dasht-e Sar-e Sharqi Rural District) of Dabudasht District. The following census in 2011 counted 406 people in 123 households. The 2016 census measured the population of the village as 414 people in 137 households, by which time the rural district had been separated from the district in the formation of Dasht-e Sar District and renamed Dasht-e Sar-e Sharqi Rural District.
