= Vosta Kola, Amol =

Village in Mazandaran province, Iran

Vosta Kola Persian: وسطی كلا
- Village
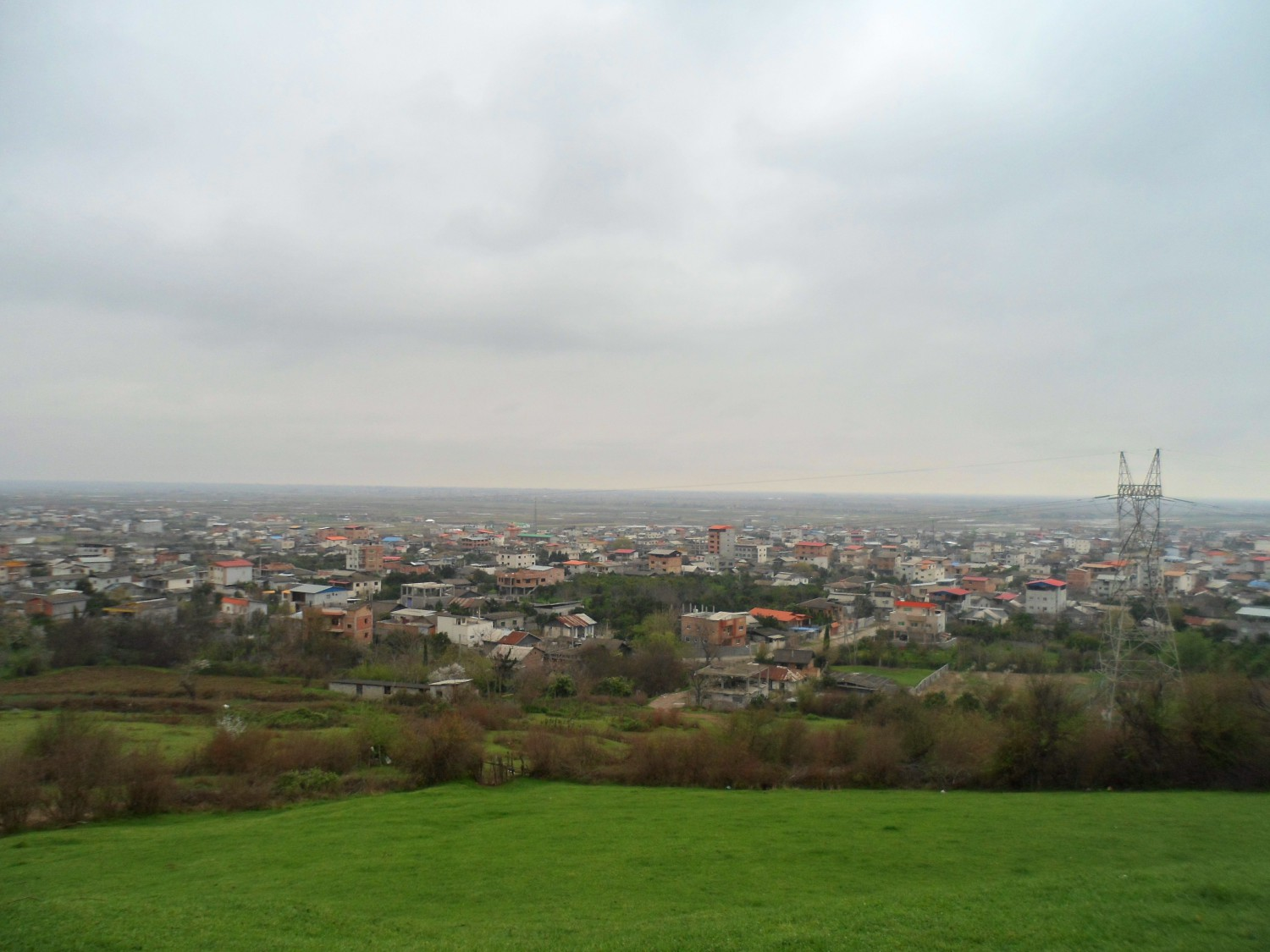
- The village of Vosta Kola

- Location within Iran
- Coordinates: 36°23′14″N 52°30′15″E
- Country: Iran
- Province: Mazandaran
- County: Amol
- District: Dasht-e Sar
- Rural District: Dasht-e Sar-e Sharqi

Population (2016)
  - Total: 4,467
- Time zone: UTC+3:30 (IRST)

Vosta Kola (Persian: وسطی کلا) (Note: Also romanized as Vostā Kalā, Vosţá Kolā, and Vostā Kolā) is a village in Dasht-e Sar-e Sharqi Rural District (Note: Formerly Dasht-e Sar Rural District) of Dasht-e Sar District in Amol County, Mazandaran province, Iran.

== Demographics ==
=== Population ===
At the time of the 2006 National Census, the village's population was 4,092 in 988 households, when it was in Dasht-e Sar Rural District (Note: Renamed Dasht-e Sar-e Sharqi Rural District) of Dabudasht District. The following census in 2011 counted 4,318 people in 1,219 households. The 2016 census measured the population of the village as 4,467 people in 1,468 households, by which time the rural district had been separated from the district in the formation of Dasht-e Sar District and renamed Dasht-e Sar-e Sharqi Rural District.
