= Sorkh Kola, Amol =

Village in Mazandaran province, Iran

Sorkh Kola Persian: سرخ كلا
- Village
- Location within Iran
- Coordinates: 36°25′39″N 52°29′17″E
- Country: Iran
- Province: Mazandaran
- County: Amol
- District: Dasht-e Sar
- Rural District: Dasht-e Sar-e Sharqi

Population (2016)
  - Total: 1,554
- Time zone: UTC+3:30 (IRST)

Sorkh Kola (Persian: سرخ كلا) (Note: Also romanized as Sorkh Kolā) is a village in Dasht-e Sar-e Sharqi Rural District (Note: Formerly Dasht-e Sar Rural District) of Dasht-e Sar District in Amol County, Mazandaran province, Iran.

== Demographics ==
=== Population ===
At the time of the 2006 National Census, the village's population was 1,374 in 342 households, when it was in Dasht-e Sar Rural District (Note: Renamed Dasht-e Sar-e Sharqi Rural District) of Dabudasht District. The following census in 2011 counted 1,410 people in 393 households. The 2016 census measured the population of the village as 1,554 people in 520 households, by which time the rural district had been separated from the district in the formation of Dasht-e Sar District and renamed Dasht-e Sar-e Sharqi Rural District.
