= Vaskas =

Vaskas (Persian: واسكس) may refer to:

- Vaskas, Amol
- Vaskas, Qaem Shahr
