= Sorkh Kola =

Sorkh Kola or Sorkh Kala (Persian: سرخ كلا) may refer to:

- Sorkh Kola, Amol
- Sorkh Kola, Sari
- Sorkhkola Rural District
