= Nezamabad, Mazandaran =

Village in Mazandaran province, Iran

Nezamabad Persian: نظام اباد
- Village
- Location within Iran
- Coordinates: 36°26′03″N 52°28′13″E
- Country: Iran
- Province: Mazandaran
- County: Amol
- District: Dasht-e Sar
- Rural District: Dasht-e Sar-e Sharqi

Population (2016)
  - Total: 593
- Time zone: UTC+3:30 (IRST)

Nezamabad (Persian: نظام اباد) (Note: Also romanized as Nez̧āmābād) is a village in, and the capital of, Dasht-e Sar-e Sharqi Rural District (Note: Formerly Dasht-e Sar Rural District) in Dasht-e Sar District of Amol County, Mazandaran province, Iran. The previous capital of the rural district was the village of Najjar Mahalleh.

== Demographics ==
=== Population ===
At the time of the 2006 National Census, the village's population was 649 in 169 households, when it was in Dasht-e Sar Rural District (Note: Renamed Dasht-e Sar-e Sharqi Rural District) of Dabudasht District. The following census in 2011 counted 609 people in 184 households. The 2016 census measured the population of the village as 593 people in 199 households, by which time the rural district had been separated from the district in the formation of Dasht-e Sar District and renamed Dasht-e Sar-e Sharqi Rural District.
