= Arab Kheyl, Amol =

Village in Mazandaran province, Iran

Arab Kheyl Persian: عرب خيل
- Village
- Location within Iran
- Coordinates: 36°28′42″N 52°29′03″E
- Country: Iran
- Province: Mazandaran
- County: Amol
- District: Dasht-e Sar
- Rural District: Dasht-e Sar-e Sharqi

Population (2016)
  - Total: 467
- Time zone: UTC+3:30 (IRST)

Arab Kheyl (Persian: عرب خيل) (Note: Also romanized as ‘Arab Khil) is a village in Dasht-e Sar-e Sharqi Rural District (Note: Formerly Dasht-e Sar Rural District) of Dasht-e Sar District in Amol County, Mazandaran province, Iran.

== Demographics ==
=== Population ===
At the time of the 2006 National Census, the village's population was 329 in 79 households, when it was in Dasht-e Sar Rural District (Note: Renamed Dasht-e Sar-e Sharqi Rural District) of Dabudasht District. The following census in 2011 counted 297 people in 81 households. The 2016 census measured the population of the village as 467 people in 147 households, by which time the rural district had been separated from the district in the formation of Dasht-e Sar District and renamed Dasht-e Sar-e Sharqi Rural District.
