= Firuz Kola-ye Sofla, Amol =

Village in Mazandaran province, Iran

Firuz Kola-ye Sofla Persian: فيروزكلا سفلی
- Village
- Location within Iran
- Country: Iran
- Province: Mazandaran
- County: Amol
- District: Dasht-e Sar
- Rural District: Dasht-e Sar-e Gharbi

Population (2016)
  - Total: 822
- Time zone: UTC+3:30 (IRST)

Firuz Kola-ye Sofla (Persian: فيروزكلا سفلی) (Note: Also romanized as Fīrūz Kolā-ye Soflá; also known as Fīrūz Kolā-ye Pā’īn) is a village in Dasht-e Sar-e Gharbi Rural District of Dasht-e Sar District in Amol County, Mazandaran province, Iran.

== Demographics ==
=== Population ===
At the time of the 2006 National Census, the village's population was 841 in 227 households, when it was in Dasht-e Sar Rural District (Note: Renamed Dasht-e Sar-e Sharqi Rural District) of Dabudasht District. The following census in 2011 counted 894 people in 271 households. The 2016 census measured the population of the village as 822 people in 276 households, by which time the rural district had been separated from the district in the formation of Dasht-e Sar District and renamed Dasht-e Sar-e Sharqi Rural District. Firuz Kola-ye Sofla was transferred to Dasht-e Sar-e Gharbi Rural District created in the new district.
