= Zavarak, Amol =

Village in Mazandaran province, Iran

Zavarak Persian: زوارك
- Village
- Location within Iran
- Coordinates: 36°24′01″N 52°26′22″E
- Country: Iran
- Province: Mazandaran
- County: Amol
- District: Dasht-e Sar
- Rural District: Dasht-e Sar-e Gharbi

Population (2016)
  - Total: 345
- Time zone: UTC+3:30 (IRST)

Zavarak (Persian: زوارك) (Note: Also romanized as Zavārak) is a village in Dasht-e Sar-e Gharbi Rural District of Dasht-e Sar District in Amol County, Mazandaran province, Iran.

== Demographics ==
=== Population ===
At the time of the 2006 National Census, the village's population was 352 in 97 households, when it was in Dasht-e Sar Rural District (Note: Renamed Dasht-e Sar-e Sharqi Rural District) of Dabudasht District. The following census in 2011 counted 355 people in 104 households. The 2016 census measured the population of the village as 345 people in 120 households, by which time the rural district had been separated from the district in the formation of Dasht-e Sar District and renamed Dasht-e Sar-e Sharqi Rural District. Zavarak was transferred to Dasht-e Sar-e Gharbi Rural District created in the new district.
