= Vosta Kola =

Vosta Kola or Vosta Kala (Persian: وسطي كلا) may refer to:

- Vosta Kola, Amol
- Vosta Kola, Qaem Shahr
