= Arab Kheyl =

Arab Kheyl or Arab Khil (Persian: عرب خيل) may refer to:

- Arab Kheyl, Amol
- Arab Kheyl, Babolsar
- Arab Kheyl, Sari
