= Tamesk, Dasht-e Sar =

Village in Mazandaran province, Iran

Tamesk Persian: تمسك
- Village
- Location within Iran
- Coordinates: 36°25′13″N 52°28′40″E
- Country: Iran
- Province: Mazandaran
- County: Amol
- District: Dasht-e Sar
- Rural District: Dasht-e Sar-e Sharqi

Population (2016)
  - Total: 1,164
- Time zone: UTC+3:30 (IRST)

Tamesk (Persian: تمسك) (Note: Also romanized as Tamask; also known as Tamask-e Pā’īn) is a village in Dasht-e Sar-e Sharqi Rural District (Note: Formerly Dasht-e Sar Rural District) of Dasht-e Sar District in Amol County, Mazandaran province, Iran.

== Demographics ==
=== Population ===
At the time of the 2006 National Census, the village's population was 944 in 265 households, when it was in Dasht-e Sar Rural District (Note: Renamed Dasht-e Sar-e Sharqi Rural District) of Dabudasht District. The following census in 2011 counted 1,022 people in 356 households. The 2016 census measured the population of the village as 1,164 people in 388 households, by which time the rural district had been separated from the district in the formation of Dasht-e Sar District and renamed Dasht-e Sar-e Sharqi Rural District.
