= Najjar Mahalleh =

Neighborhood in Mazandaran province, Iran

Najjar Mahalleh Persian: نجارمحله
- Neighborhood
- Location within Iran
- Coordinates: 36°26′38″N 52°27′16″E
- Country: Iran
- Province: Mazandaran
- County: Amol
- District: Dasht-e Sar
- City: Babakan

Population (2011)
  - Total: 820
- Time zone: UTC+3:30 (IRST)

Najjar Mahalleh (Persian: نجارمحله) (Note: Also romanized as Najjār Maḩalleh) is a neighborhood in the city of Babakan (Note: Formerly known as Ejbar Kola) in Dasht-e Sar District of Amol County, Mazandaran province, Iran. As a village, it was the capital of Dasht-e Sar Rural District (Note: Renamed Dasht-e Sar-e Sharqi Rural District) in Dabudasht District until its capital was transferred to the village of Nezamabad.

== Demographics ==
=== Population ===
At the time of the 2006 National Census, Najjar Mahalleh's population was 841 in 238 households, when it was a village in Dasht-e Sar Rural District of Dabudasht District. The following census in 2011 counted 820 people in 266 households.

In 2012, the village of Ejbar Kola was merged with the villages of Harun Kola, Khuni Sar, Nafar Kheyl, and Najjar Mahalleh to become a larger village of the same name. Ejbar Kola was converted to a city in 2017 and renamed Babakan in 2019.
