= Baghban Kola, Amol =

Village in Mazandaran province, Iran

Baghban Kola Persian: باغبانكلا
- Village
- Location within Iran
- Coordinates: 36°28′39″N 52°28′22″E
- Country: Iran
- Province: Mazandaran
- County: Amol
- District: Dasht-e Sar
- Rural District: Dasht-e Sar-e Sharqi

Population (2016)
  - Total: 152
- Time zone: UTC+3:30 (IRST)

Baghban Kola (Persian: باغبانكلا) (Note: Also romanized as Bāghbān Kolā) is a village in Dasht-e Sar-e Sharqi Rural District (Note: Formerly Dasht-e Sar Rural District) of Dasht-e Sar District in Amol County, Mazandaran province, Iran.

== Demographics ==
=== Population ===
At the time of the 2006 National Census, the village's population was 250 in 65 households, when it was in Dasht-e Sar Rural District (Note: Renamed Dasht-e Sar-e Sharqi Rural District) of Dabudasht District. The following census in 2011 counted 144 people in 43 households. The 2016 census measured the population of the village as 152 people in 49 households, by which time the rural district had been separated from the district in the formation of Dasht-e Sar District and renamed Dasht-e Sar-e Sharqi Rural District.
