= Firuz Kola-ye Vosta =

Village in Mazandaran province, Iran

Firuz Kola-ye Vosta Persian: فيروزكلا وسطی
- Village
- Location within Iran
- Country: Iran
- Province: Mazandaran
- County: Amol
- District: Dasht-e Sar
- Rural District: Dasht-e Sar-e Gharbi

Population (2016)
  - Total: 652
- Time zone: UTC+3:30 (IRST)

Firuz Kola-ye Vosta (Persian: فيروزكلا وسطی) (Note: Also romanized as Fīrūz Kolā-ye Vosţá) is a village in, and the capital of, Dasht-e Sar-e Gharbi Rural District in Dasht-e Sar District of Amol County, Mazandaran province, Iran.

== Demographics ==
=== Population ===
At the time of the 2006 National Census, the village's population was 683 in 180 households, when it was in Dasht-e Sar Rural District (Note: Renamed Dasht-e Sar-e Sharqi Rural District) of Dabudasht District. The following census in 2011 counted 695 people in 193 households. The 2016 census measured the population of the village as 652 people in 226 households, by which time the rural district had been separated from the district in the formation of Dasht-e Sar District and renamed Dasht-e Sar-e Sharqi Rural District. Firuz Kola-ye Vosta was transferred to Dasht-e Sar-e Gharbi Rural District created in the new district.
