= Shahneh Kola, Amol =

Village in Mazandaran province, Iran

Shahneh Kola Persian: شهنه كلا
- Village
- Location within Iran
- Coordinates: 36°23′50″N 52°26′45″E
- Country: Iran
- Province: Mazandaran
- County: Amol
- District: Dasht-e Sar
- Rural District: Dasht-e Sar-e Gharbi

Population (2016)
  - Total: 1,062
- Time zone: UTC+3:30 (IRST)

Shahneh Kola (Persian: شهنه كلا) (Note: Also romanized as Shahneh Kolā) is a village in Dasht-e Sar-e Gharbi Rural District of Dasht-e Sar District in Amol County, Mazandaran province, Iran.

== Demographics ==
=== Population ===
At the time of the 2006 National Census, the village's population was 1,026 in 292 households, when it was in Dasht-e Sar Rural District (Note: Renamed Dasht-e Sar-e Sharqi Rural District) of Dabudasht District. The following census in 2011 counted 1,055 people in 327 households. The 2016 census measured the population of the village as 1,062 people in 373 households, by which time the rural district had been separated from the district in the formation of Dasht-e Sar District and renamed Dasht-e Sar-e Sharqi Rural District. Shahneh Kola was transferred to Dasht-e Sar-e Gharbi Rural District created in the new district.
