= Valik-e Olya =

Village in Mazandaran province, Iran

Valik-e Olya Persian: وليك عليا
- Village
- Location within Iran
- Coordinates: 36°33′56″N 52°25′12″E
- Country: Iran
- Province: Mazandaran
- County: Amol
- District: Dabudasht
- Rural District: Dabuy-ye Miyani

Population (2016)
  - Total: 646
- Time zone: UTC+3:30 (IRST)

Valik-e Olya (Persian: وليك عليا) (Note: Also romanized as Valīk-e ‘Olyā; also known as Valīk-e Bālā) is a village in Dabuy-ye Miyani Rural District of Dabudasht District in Amol County, Mazandaran province, Iran.

== Demographics ==
=== Population ===
At the time of the 2006 National Census, the village's population was 628 in 178 households, when it was in Dabuy-ye Jonubi Rural District. The following census in 2011 counted 616 people in 194 households. The 2016 census measured the population of the village as 646 people in 218 households, by which time it had been separated from the rural district in the creation of Dabuy-ye Miyani Rural District in the same district.
