= Do Tireh =

Village in Mazandaran province, Iran

Do Tireh Persian: دوتيره
- Village
- Location within Iran
- Coordinates: 36°34′43″N 52°28′08″E
- Country: Iran
- Province: Mazandaran
- County: Amol
- District: Dabudasht
- Rural District: Dabuy-ye Miyani

Population (2016)
  - Total: 513
- Time zone: UTC+3:30 (IRST)

Do Tireh (Persian: دوتيره) (Note: Also Romanized as Do Tīreh) is a village in Dabuy-ye Miyani Rural District of Dabudasht District in Amol County, Mazandaran province, Iran.

== Demographics ==
=== Population ===
At the time of the 2006 National Census, the village's population was 554 in 146 households, when it was in Dabuy-ye Jonubi Rural District. The following census in 2011 counted 582 people in 178 households. The 2016 census measured the population of the village as 513 people in 164 households, by which time it had been separated from the rural district in the creation of Dabuy-ye Miyani Rural District in the same district.
