= Owjak =

Village in Mazandaran province, Iran

Owjak Persian: اوجاك
- Village
- Location within Iran
- Coordinates: 36°33′55″N 52°27′20″E
- Country: Iran
- Province: Mazandaran
- County: Amol
- District: Dabudasht
- Rural District: Dabuy-ye Miyani

Population (2016)
  - Total: 702
- Time zone: UTC+3:30 (IRST)

Owjak (Persian: اوجاك) (Note: Also romanized as Owjāk and Ūjāk) is a village in Dabuy-ye Miyani Rural District of Dabudasht District in Amol County, Mazandaran province, Iran.

== Demographics ==
=== Population ===
At the time of the 2006 National Census, the village's population was 705 in 194 households, when it was in Dabuy-ye Jonubi Rural District. The following census in 2011 counted 708 people in 223 households. The 2016 census measured the population of the village as 702 people in 246 households, by which time it had been separated from the rural district in the creation of Dabuy-ye Miyani Rural District in the same district.
