= Eshkar Kola =

Village in Mazandaran province, Iran

Eshkar Kola Persian: اشكاركلا
- Village
- Location within Iran
- Coordinates: 36°33′23″N 52°26′21″E
- Country: Iran
- Province: Mazandaran
- County: Amol
- District: Dabudasht
- Rural District: Dabuy-ye Miyani

Population (2016)
  - Total: 603
- Time zone: UTC+3:30 (IRST)

Eshkar Kola (Persian: اشكاركلا) (Note: Also romanized as Eshkār Kolā and Āshekār Kolā) is a village in Dabuy-ye Miyani Rural District of Dabudasht District in Amol County, Mazandaran province, Iran.

== Demographics ==
=== Population ===
At the time of the 2006 National Census, the village's population was 533 in 133 households, when it was in Dabuy-ye Jonubi Rural District. The following census in 2011 counted 522 people in 148 households. The 2016 census measured the population of the village as 603 people in 193 households, by which time it had been separated from the rural district in the creation of Dabuy-ye Miyani Rural District in the same district.
