= Kamangar Kola, Dabudasht =

Village in Mazandaran province, Iran

Kamangar Kola Persian: كمانگركلا
- Village
- Location within Iran
- Coordinates: 36°34′17″N 52°29′51″E
- Country: Iran
- Province: Mazandaran
- County: Amol
- District: Dabudasht
- Rural District: Dabuy-ye Miyani

Population (2016)
  - Total: 601
- Time zone: UTC+3:30 (IRST)

Kamangar Kola (Persian: كمانگركلا) (Note: Also romanized as Kamāngar Kolā) is a village in Dabuy-ye Miyani Rural District of Dabudasht District in Amol County, Mazandaran province, Iran.

== Demographics ==
=== Population ===
At the time of the 2006 National Census, the village's population was 629 in 164 households, when it was in Dabuy-ye Jonubi Rural District. The following census in 2011 counted 603 people in 178 households. The 2016 census measured the population of the village as 601 people in 202 households, by which time it had been separated from the rural district in the creation of Dabuy-ye Miyani Rural District in the same district.
