= Babakan, Mazandaran =

City in Mazandaran province, Iran

Babakan Persian: بابكان
- City
- Location within Iran
- Coordinates: 36°27′19″N 52°27′28″E
- Country: Iran
- Province: Mazandaran
- County: Amol
- District: Dasht-e Sar

Population (2016)
  - Total: 4,499
- Time zone: UTC+3:30 (IRST)

Babakan (Persian: بابكان) (Note: Formerly Ejbar Kola (اجباركلا), also romanized as Ejbār Kolā; also known as Ejbār Kolā-ye Bālā) is a city in, and the capital of, Dasht-e Sar District in Amol County, Mazandaran province, Iran.

== Demographics ==
=== Population ===
At the time of the 2006 National Census, its population, as the village of Ejbar Kola in Dasht-e Sar Rural District (Note: Renamed Dasht-e Sar-e Sharqi Rural District) of Dabudasht District, was 1,829 in 458 households. The following census in 2011 counted 2,028 people in 583 households. The 2016 census measured the population as 4,499 people in 1,462 households, by which time the rural district had been separated from the district in the formation of Dasht-e Sar District and renamed Dasht-e Sar-e Sharqi Rural District. Ejbar Kola merged with the villages of Harun Kola, Khuni Sar, Nafar Kheyl, and Najjar Mahalleh.

Ejbar Kola was converted to a city in 2017 and renamed Babakan in 2019.
