= Marzangu =

Village in Mazandaran province, Iran

Marzangu Persian: مرزنگو
- Village
- Location within Iran
- Coordinates: 36°35′36″N 52°28′36″E
- Country: Iran
- Province: Mazandaran
- County: Amol
- District: Dabudasht
- Rural District: Dabuy-ye Miyani

Population (2016)
  - Total: 1,643
- Time zone: UTC+3:30 (IRST)

Marzangu (Persian: مرزنگو) (Note: Also romanized as Marzangū) is a village in Dabuy-ye Miyani Rural District of Dabudasht District in Amol County, Mazandaran province, Iran.

== Demographics ==
=== Population ===
At the time of the 2006 National Census, the village's population was 1,600 in 437 households, when it was in Dabuy-ye Jonubi Rural District. The following census in 2011 counted 1,677 people in 523 households. The 2016 census measured the population of the village as 1,643 people in 587 households, by which time it had been separated from the rural district in the creation of Dabuy-ye Miyani Rural District in the same district.
