= Firuz Kola-ye Sofla =

Firuz Kola-ye Sofla (Persian: فيروزكلاسفلي), also known as FIruz Kola-ye Pain, may refer to:

- Firuz Kola-ye Sofla, Amol
- Firuz Kola-ye Sofla, Nowshahr
