= Marij Mahalleh =

Village in Mazandaran province, Iran

Marij Mahalleh Persian: مريج محله
- Village
- Location within Iran
- Coordinates: 36°37′29″N 52°27′32″E
- Country: Iran
- Province: Mazandaran
- County: Amol
- District: Dabudasht
- Rural District: Dabuy-ye Miyani

Population (2016)
  - Total: 2,099
- Time zone: UTC+3:30 (IRST)

Marij Mahalleh (Persian: مريج محله) (Note: Also romanized as Marīj Maḩalleh) is a village in Dabuy-ye Miyani Rural District of Dabudasht District in Amol County, Mazandaran province, Iran.

== Demographics ==
=== Population ===
At the time of the 2006 National Census, the village's population was 2,134 in 553 households, when it was in Dabuy-ye Jonubi Rural District. The following census in 2011 counted 2,233 people in 679 households. The 2016 census measured the population of the village as 2,099 people in 719 households, by which time it had been separated from the rural district in the creation of Dabuy-ye Miyani Rural District in the same district. Marij Mahalleh was the most populous village in its rural district.
