= Dabuy-ye Miyani Rural District =

Rural district in Mazandaran province, Iran

Dabuy-ye Miyani Rural District Persian: دهستان دابوی میانی
- Rural District
- Location within Iran
- Coordinates: 36°36′N 52°28′E
- Country: Iran
- Province: Mazandaran
- County: Amol
- District: Dabudasht
- Established: 2012
- Capital: Ahangar Kola-ye Olya

Population (2016)
  - Total: 18,641
- Time zone: UTC+3:30 (IRST)

Dabuy-ye Miyani Rural District (Persian: دهستان دابوی میانی) is in Dabudasht District of Amol County, Mazandaran province, Iran. Its capital is the village of Ahangar Kola-ye Olya.

== History ==
Dabuy-ye Miyani Rural District was created in Dabudasht District in 2012.

== Demographics ==
=== Population ===
The 2016 National Census measured the population of the rural district as 18,641 in 6,320 households. The most populous of its 38 villages was Marij Mahalleh, with 2,099 people.

=== Other villages in the rural district ===
- Ahangar Kola-ye Sofla
- Do Tireh
- Eshkar Kola
- Eslamabad
- Ghias Kola
- Kabud Kola
- Kachap-e Kolva
- Kachap-e Olya
- Kachap-e Sofla
- Kamangar Kola
- Marzangu
- Owjak
- Valik-e Olya
- Vaskas
