= Ghias Kola =

Village in Mazandaran province, Iran

Ghias Kola Persian: غياث كلا
- Village
- Location within Iran
- Coordinates: 36°34′34″N 52°31′02″E
- Country: Iran
- Province: Mazandaran
- County: Amol
- District: Dabudasht
- Rural District: Dabuy-ye Miyani

Population (2016)
  - Total: 584
- Time zone: UTC+3:30 (IRST)

Ghias Kola (Persian: غياث كلا) (Note: Also romanized as Ghīās̄ Kolā) is a village in Dabuy-ye Miyani Rural District of Dabudasht District in Amol County, Mazandaran province, Iran.

== Demographics ==
=== Population ===
At the time of the 2006 National Census, the village's population was 556 in 160 households, when it was in Dabuy-ye Jonubi Rural District. The following census in 2011 counted 577 people in 188 households. The 2016 census measured the population of the village as 584 people in 205 households, by which time it had been separated from the rural district in the creation of Dabuy-ye Miyani Rural District in the same district.
