= Eslamabad, Amol =

Village in Mazandaran province, Iran

Eslamabad Persian: اسلام اباد
- Village
- Location within Iran
- Coordinates: 36°34′55″N 52°26′02″E
- Country: Iran
- Province: Mazandaran
- County: Amol
- District: Dabudasht
- Rural District: Dabuy-ye Miyani

Population (2016)
  - Total: 656
- Time zone: UTC+3:30 (IRST)

Eslamabad (Persian: اسلام اباد) (Note: Also romanized as Eslāmābād) is a village in Dabuy-ye Miyani Rural District of Dabudasht District in Amol County, Mazandaran province, Iran.

== Demographics ==
=== Population ===
At the time of the 2006 National Census, the village's population was 658 in 173 households, when it was in Dabuy-ye Jonubi Rural District. The following census in 2011 counted 675 people in 200 households. The 2016 census measured the population of the village as 656 people in 210 households, by which time it had been separated from the rural district in the creation of Dabuy-ye Miyani Rural District in the same district.
