= Firuz Kola-ye Olya =

Firuz Kola-ye Olya (Persian: فيروزكلاعليا) may refer to:

- Firuz Kola-ye Olya, Amol
- Firuz Kola-ye Olya, Nowshahr
