= Vaskas, Amol =

Village in Mazandaran province, Iran

Vaskas Persian: واسكس
- Village
- Location within Iran
- Coordinates: 36°35′14″N 52°28′21″E
- Country: Iran
- Province: Mazandaran
- County: Amol
- District: Dabudasht
- Rural District: Dabuy-ye Miyani

Population (2016)
  - Total: 899
- Time zone: UTC+3:30 (IRST)

Vaskas (Persian: واسكس) (Note: Also romanized as Vāskas) is a village in Dabuy-ye Miyani Rural District of Dabudasht District in Amol County, Mazandaran province, Iran.

== Demographics ==
=== Population ===
At the time of the 2006 National Census, the village's population was 1,014 in 275 households, when it was in Dabuy-ye Jonubi Rural District. The following census in 2011 counted 997 people in 310 households. The 2016 census measured the population of the village as 899 people in 309 households, by which time it had been separated from the rural district in the creation of Dabuy-ye Miyani Rural District in the same district.
