= Kachap-e Sofla =

Village in Mazandaran province, Iran

Kachap-e Sofla Persian: كچپسفلي
- Village
- Location within Iran
- Coordinates: 36°36′36″N 52°27′34″E
- Country: Iran
- Province: Mazandaran
- County: Amol
- District: Dabudasht
- Rural District: Dabuy-ye Miyani

Population (2016)
  - Total: 822
- Time zone: UTC+3:30 (IRST)

Kachap-e Sofla (Persian: كچپسفلي) (Note: Also romanized as Kachap-e Soflá; also known as Kachab-e Pā’īn) is a village in Dabuy-ye Miyani Rural District of Dabudasht District in Amol County, Mazandaran province, Iran.

== Demographics ==
=== Population ===
At the time of the 2006 National Census, the village's population was 869 in 230 households, when it was in Dabuy-ye Jonubi Rural District. The following census in 2011 counted 842 people in 249 households. The 2016 census measured the population of the village as 822 people in 262 households, by which time it had been separated from the rural district in the creation of Dabuy-ye Miyani Rural District in the same district.
