= Baghban Kola, Nur =

Baghban Kola باغبان كلا
- Village
- Location within Iran
- Coordinates: 36°31′17″N 52°09′44″E
- Country: Iran
- Province: Mazandaran
- County: Nur
- Bakhsh: Chamestan
- Rural District: Natel-e Restaq

Population (2006)
  - Total: 476
- Time zone: UTC+3:30 (IRST)
  - Summer (DST): UTC+4:30 (IRDT)

Baghban Kola (Persian: باغبان كلا, also Romanized as Bāghbān Kolā) is a village in Natel-e Restaq Rural District, Chamestan District, Nur County, Mazandaran Province, Iran. At the 2006 census, its population was 476, in 114 families.
