= Kachap-e Olya =

Village in Mazandaran province, Iran

Kachap-e Olya Persian: كچپعليا
- Village
- Location within Iran
- Coordinates: 36°36′18″N 52°27′37″E
- Country: Iran
- Province: Mazandaran
- County: Amol
- District: Dabudasht
- Rural District: Dabuy-ye Miyani

Population (2016)
  - Total: 585
- Time zone: UTC+3:30 (IRST)

Kachap-e Olya (Persian: كچپعليا) (Note: Also romanized as Kachap-e ‘Olyā; also known as Kachab-e Bālā) is a village in Dabuy-ye Miyani Rural District of Dabudasht District in Amol County, Mazandaran province, Iran.

== Demographics ==
=== Population ===
At the time of the 2006 National Census, the village's population was 648 in 185 households, when it was in Dabuy-ye Jonubi Rural District. The following census in 2011 counted 626 people in 204 households. The 2016 census measured the population of the village as 585 people in 217 households, by which time it had been separated from the rural district in the creation of Dabuy-ye Miyani Rural District in the same district.
