= Kabud Kola, Amol =

Village in Mazandaran province, Iran

Kabud Kola Persian: كبودكلا
- Village
- Location within Iran
- Coordinates: 36°34′38″N 52°29′07″E
- Country: Iran
- Province: Mazandaran
- County: Amol
- District: Dabudasht
- Rural District: Dabuy-ye Miyani

Population (2016)
  - Total: 763
- Time zone: UTC+3:30 (IRST)

Kabud Kola (Persian: كبودكلا) (Note: Also romanized as Kabūd Kolā) is a village in Dabuy-ye Miyani Rural District of Dabudasht District in Amol County, Mazandaran province, Iran.

== Demographics ==
=== Population ===
At the time of the 2006 National Census, the village's population was 787 in 190 households, when it was in Dabuy-ye Jonubi Rural District. The following census in 2011 counted 803 people in 229 households. The 2016 census measured the population of the village as 763 people in 254 households, by which time it had been separated from the rural district in the creation of Dabuy-ye Miyani Rural District in the same district.
