= Kachap-e Kolva =

Village in Mazandaran province, Iran

Kachap-e Kolva Persian: كچپكلوا
- Village
- Location within Iran
- Coordinates: 36°36′11″N 52°28′04″E
- Country: Iran
- Province: Mazandaran
- County: Amol
- District: Dabudasht
- Rural District: Dabuy-ye Miyani

Population (2016)
  - Total: 651
- Time zone: UTC+3:30 (IRST)

Kachap-e Kolva (Persian: كچپكلوا) (Note: Also romanized as Kachap-e Kolvā) is a village in Dabuy-ye Miyani Rural District of Dabudasht District in Amol County, Mazandaran province, Iran.

== Demographics ==
=== Population ===
At the time of the 2006 National Census, the village's population was 574 in 169 households, when it was in Dabuy-ye Jonubi Rural District. The following census in 2011 counted 643 people in 206 households. The 2016 census measured the population of the village as 651 people in 227 households, by which time it had been separated from the rural district in the creation of Dabuy-ye Miyani Rural District in the same district.
