= Ahangar Kola-ye Now Kandeh =

Ahangar Kola-ye Now Kandeh آهنگركلا نوكنده
- Village
- Location within Iran
- Coordinates: 36°31′35″N 52°53′50″E
- Country: Iran
- Province: Mazandaran
- County: Qaem Shahr
- Bakhsh: Central
- Rural District: Nowkand Kola

Population (2016)
  - Total: 561
- Time zone: UTC+3:30 (IRST)

Ahangar Kola-ye Now Kandeh (Persian: آهنگركلا نوكنده, also Romanized as Āhangar Kolā-ye Now Kandeh; also known as Āhangar Kolā) is a village in Nowkand Kola Rural District, in the Central District of Qaem Shahr County, Mazandaran Province, Iran.

At the time of the 2006 National Census, the village's population was 572 in 144 households. The following census in 2011 counted 585 people in 184 households. The 2016 census measured the population of the village as 561 people in 185 households.
