= Ahangar Kola-ye Sofla =

Village in Mazandaran province, Iran

Ahangar Kola-ye Sofla Persian: اهنگركلاسفلي
- Village
- Location within Iran
- Coordinates: 36°36′N 52°29′E
- Country: Iran
- Province: Mazandaran
- County: Amol
- District: Dabudasht
- Rural District: Dabuy-ye Miyani

Population (2016)
  - Total: 671
- Time zone: UTC+3:30 (IRST)

Ahangar Kola-ye Sofla (Persian: اهنگركلاسفلي) (Note: Also romanized as Āhangar Kolā-ye Soflá) is a village in Dabuy-ye Miyani Rural District of Dabudasht District in Amol County, Mazandaran province, Iran.

== Demographics ==
=== Population ===
At the time of the 2006 National Census, the village's population was 574 in 155 households, when it was in Dabuy-ye Jonubi Rural District. The following census in 2011 counted 620 people in 188 households. The 2016 census measured the population of the village as 671 people in 225 households, by which time it had been separated from the rural district in the creation of Dabuy-ye Miyani Rural District in the same district.
