= Tir Kola, Babol =

Tir Kola تیرکلا
- Village
- Interactive map of Tir Kola
- Coordinates: 36.492°N 52.628°E
- Country: Iran
- Province: Mazandaran
- County: Babol
- Bakhsh: Central
- Rural District: Esbu Kola

Population (2016)
  - Total: 244
- Time zone: UTC+3:30 (IRST)

Tir Kola (Persian: تیرکلا, also Romanized as Tīr Kolā) is a village in Esbu Kola Rural District, in the Central District of Babol County, Mazandaran Province, Iran.

At the time of the 2006 National Census, the village's population was 195 in 41 households. The following census in 2011 counted 211 people in 61 households. The 2016 census measured the population of the village as 244 people in 61 households.
