= Kabud Kola, Babol =

Kabud Kola كبودكلا
- Village
- Location within Iran
- Coordinates: 36°30′34″N 52°46′21″E
- Country: Iran
- Province: Mazandaran
- County: Babol
- Bakhsh: Central
- Rural District: Feyziyeh

Population (2016)
  - Total: 304
- Time zone: UTC+3:30 (IRST)

Kabud Kola (Persian: كبودكلا, also Romanized as Kabūd Kolā) is a village in Feyziyeh Rural District, in the Central District of Babol County, Mazandaran Province, Iran.

At the time of the 2006 National Census, the village's population was 357 in 88 households. The following census in 2011 counted 338 people in 97 households. The 2016 census measured the population of the village as 304 people in 93 households.
