= Ahangar Kola, Babol =

Ahangar Kola آهنگركلا
- Village
- Location within Iran
- Coordinates: 36°28′01″N 52°36′50″E
- Country: Iran
- Province: Mazandaran
- County: Babol
- Bakhsh: Central
- Rural District: Esbu Kola

Population (2016)
  - Total: 189
- Time zone: UTC+3:30 (IRST)

AhangarKela (Ahangarkala, Mazandarani: Angerkela; Persian: آهنگركلا, also Romanized as Āhangar Kolā) is a village in Esbu Kola Rural District, in the Central District of Babol County, Mazandaran Province, Iran.

At the time of the 2006 National Census, the village's population was 227 in 53 households. The following census in 2011 counted 207 people in 54 households. The 2016 census measured the population of the village as 189 people in 60 households.
