= Ahangar Kola-ye Olya =

Village in Mazandaran province, Iran

Ahangar Kola-ye Olya Persian: اهنگركلا عليا
- Village
- Location within Iran
- Coordinates: 36°35′24″N 52°29′30″E
- Country: Iran
- Province: Mazandaran
- County: Amol
- District: Dabudasht
- Rural District: Dabuy-ye Miyani

Population (2016)
  - Total: 961
- Time zone: UTC+3:30 (IRST)

Ahangar Kola-ye Olya (Persian: اهنگركلاعليا) (Note: Also romanized as Āhangar Kolā-ye ‘Olyā) is a village in, and the capital of, Dabuy-ye Miyani Rural District in Dabudasht District of Amol County, Mazandaran province, Iran.

== Demographics ==
=== Population ===
At the time of the 2006 National Census, the village's population was 925 in 233 households, when it was in Dabuy-ye Jonubi Rural District. The following census in 2011 counted 956 people in 280 households. The 2016 census measured the population of the village as 961 people in 328 households, by which time it had been separated from the rural district in the creation of Dabuy-ye Miyani Rural District in the same district.
