= Ahangar Kola, Harazpey-ye Jonubi =

Ahangar Kola آهنگركلا
- Village
- Location within Iran
- Coordinates: 36°30′12″N 52°22′24″E
- Country: Iran
- Province: Mazandaran
- County: Amol
- Bakhsh: Central
- Rural District: Harazpey-ye Jonubi

Population (2016)
  - Total: 325
- Time zone: UTC+3:30 (IRST)

AhangarKela (AhangarKala, Persian: آهنگركلا, also Romanized as Āhangar Kolā) is a village in Harazpey-ye Jonubi Rural District, in the Central District of Amol County, Mazandaran Province, Iran.

At the time of the 2006 National Census, the village's population was 276 in 67 households. The following census in 2011 counted 201 people in 64 households. The 2016 census measured the population of the village as 325 people in 110 households.
