= Dasht-e Sar-e Sharqi Rural District =

Rural district in Mazandaran province, Iran

Dasht-e Sar-e Sharqi Rural District Persian: دهستان دشت ‌سر شرقی
- Rural District
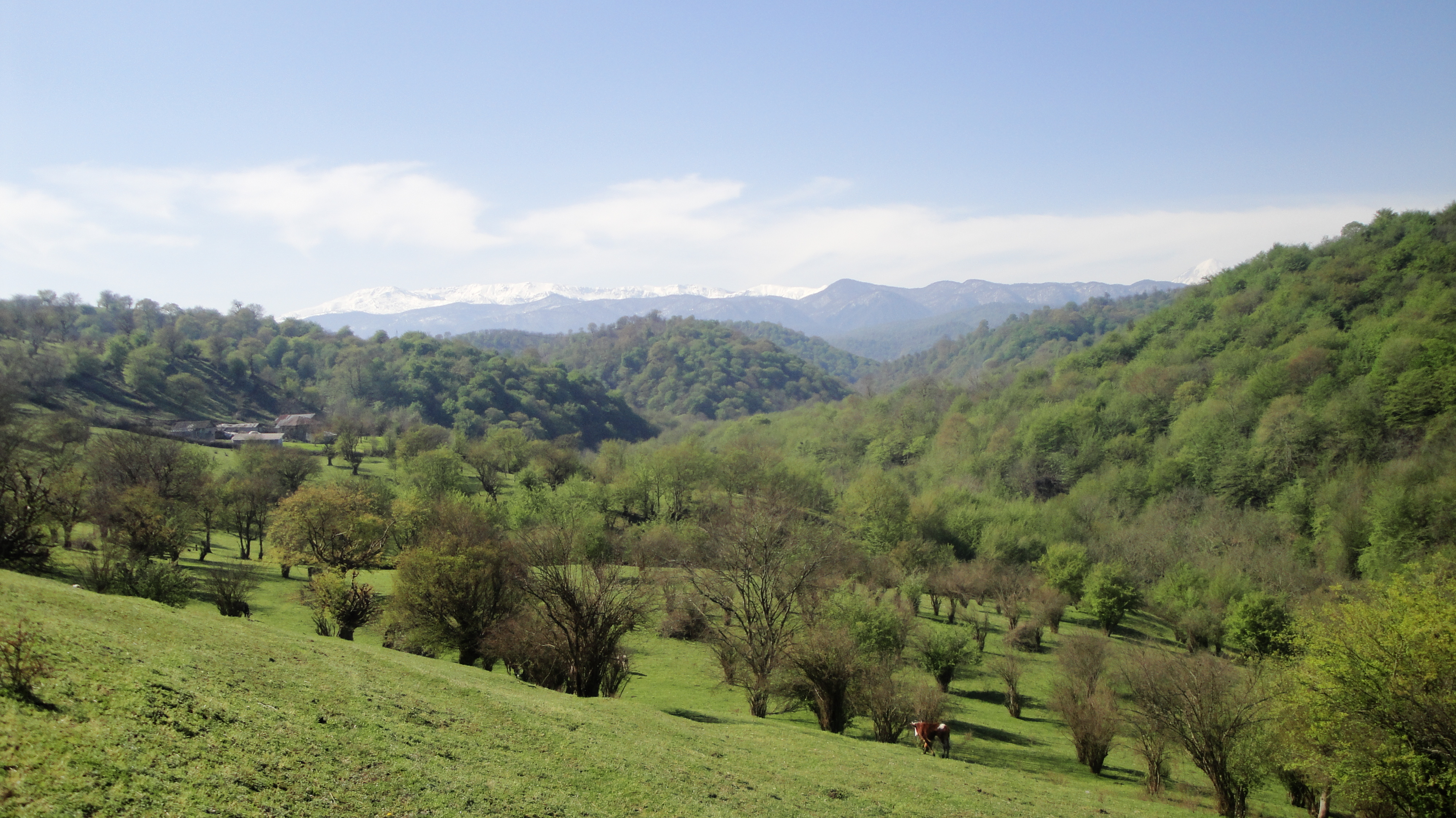
- Vosta Kola landscape

- Location within Iran
- Coordinates: 36°25′N 52°28′E
- Country: Iran
- Province: Mazandaran
- County: Amol
- District: Dasht-e Sar
- Established: 1987
- Capital: Nezamabad

Population (2016)
  - Total: 20,146
- Time zone: UTC+3:30 (IRST)

Dasht-e Sar-e Sharqi Rural District (Persian: دهستان دشت ‌سر شرقی) (Note: Formerly Dasht-e Sar Rural District (دهستان دشت ‌سر)) is in Dasht-e Sar District of Amol County, Mazandaran province, Iran. Its capital is the village of Nezamabad. The previous capital of the rural district was the village of Najjar Mahalleh, now a neighborhood in the city of Babakan.

== Demographics ==
=== Population ===
At the time of the 2006 National Census, the rural district's population (as Dasht-e Sar Rural District of Dabudasht District) was 35,795 in 9,263 households. The following census of 2011 counted 37,302 people in 10,825 households, by which time the rural district had been separated from the district in the formation of Dasht-e Sar District and renamed Dasht-e Sar-e Sharqi Rural District. The 2016 census measured the population of the rural district as 20,146 in 6,168 households. The most populous of its 22 villages was Ejbar Kola (Note: Renamed Babakan) (now the city of Babakan), with 4,499 people.
