= Dasht-e Sar District =

District in Mazandaran province, Iran

Dasht-e Sar District Persian: بخش دشت ‌سر
- District
- Location within Iran
- Coordinates: 36°21′N 52°26′E
- Country: Iran
- Province: Mazandaran
- County: Amol
- Established: 2012
- Capital: Babakan

Population (2016)
  - Total: 38,888
- Time zone: UTC+3:30 (IRST)

Dasht-e Sar District (Persian: بخش دشت ‌سر) is in Amol County, Mazandaran province, Iran. Its capital is the city of Babakan. (Note: Formerly known as Ejbar Kola)

== History ==
In 2012, Dasht-e Sar Rural District (Note: Renamed Dasht-e Sar-e Sharqi Rural District) was separated from Dabudasht District in the formation of Dasht-e Sar District. The village of Ejbar Kola was converted to a city in 2017 and renamed Babakan in 2019.

== Demographics ==
=== Population ===
The 2016 National Census measured the population of the district as 38,888 inhabitants in 12,812 households.

=== Administrative divisions ===
Dasht-e Sar District Population
Administrative Divisions	2016
Dasht-e Sar-e Gharbi RD	18,742
Dasht-e Sar-e Sharqi RD (Note: Formerly Dasht-e Sar Rural District)	20,146
Babakan (city) (Note: Became a city after the 2016 census)	
Total	38,888
RD = Rural District
