= Mianrud (disambiguation) =

Mianrud is a city in Khuzestan province, Iran.

Mianrud or Mian Rud or Miyan Rud (Persian: ميان رود) may refer to:

== Ardabil Province ==
- Mianrud, Ardabil, a village in Khalkhal County

== Fars Province ==
- Mian Rud, Eqlid, a village in Eqlid County
- Mianrud, Marvdasht, a village in Marvdasht County

== Gilan Province ==
- Mian Rud, Rezvanshahr, a village in Rezvanshahr County
- Mianrud, Pareh Sar, a village in Rezvanshahr County
- Mianrud, Rudsar, a village in Rudsar County

== Hamadan Province ==
- Miyan Rud Rural District, in Hamadan province

== Kermanshah Province ==
- Mian Rud, Gilan-e Gharb, a village in Gilan-e Gharb County
- Mianrud, Govar, a village in Gilan-e Gharb County
- Mianrud, Kermanshah, a village in Kermanshah County
- Mianrud, Firuzabad, a village in Kermanshah County

== Khuzestan Province ==
- Mianrud

== Kurdistan Province ==
- Miyanrud Rural District, an administrative division of Sanandaj County

== Lorestan Province ==
- Mian Rud-e Zaruni, Lorestan province

== Markazi Province ==
- Mian Rud, Markazi
- Mian Rud, alternate name of Mian Rudan, Markazi

== Mazandaran Province ==
- Mian Rud, Bala Khiyaban-e Litkuh, a village in Amol County
- Mian Rud, Harazpey-ye Jonubi, a village in Amol County
- Mian Rud, Dabudasht, a village in Amol County
- Mian Rud, Babol, a village in Babol County
- Mian Rud, Qaem Shahr, a village in Qaem Shahr County
- Mian Rud, Sari, a village in Sari County
- Mian Rud, Tonekabon, a village in Tonekabon County
- Mianrud Rural District, in Nur County

== South Khorasan Province ==
- Mian Rud, South Khorasan
- Mian Rud, Nehbandan, South Khorasan province
