= Palak =

Palak may refer to:

- Palak Union Council, Abbottabad District, North-West Frontier Province, Pakistan
- Palak-e Olya, a village in Mazandaran Province, Iran
- Palak-e Sofla, a village in Mazandaran Province, Iran
- Palak dïl, a lake in Mizoram, India
- Palak (Legislative Assembly constituency), an electoral constituency in Mizoram, India
- Palak (name), an Indian feminine given name
- Palaka of Avanti, an ancient Indian ruler
- Palak Pe Jhalak, an Indian television show, a remake of That's So Raven

== See also ==
- Leaf vegetable (Hindi: पालक, romanized: palak), in Indian cooking, spinach, amaranth, or other leaves eaten as a vegetable
  - Palak paneer, an Indian vegetarian dish from spinach and cottage cheese
  - Palak Gosht, an Indian meat dish containing spinach
- Pawlak, a surname
- Balak-Palak, a 2013 Indian film
