= Halikoti =

Halikoti or Hali Koti (Persian: هلي كتي) may refer to:

- Halikoti, Amol
- Hali Koti, Babol Kenar, Babol County
- Hali Koti, Bandpey-ye Sharqi, Babol County
