= Bish Mahalleh =

Bish Mahalleh (Persian: بيش محله) may refer to:

- Bish Mahalleh, Amol
- Bish Mahalleh, Dabudasht, Amol County
