= Bamoti =

Bamoti بامتي
- Village
- Location within Iran
- Coordinates: 36°31′00″N 52°20′00″E
- Country: Iran
- Province: Mazandaran
- County: Amol
- Bakhsh: Central
- Rural District: Harazpey-ye Jonubi

Population (2006)
  - Total: 218
- Time zone: UTC+3:30 (IRST)
  - Summer (DST): UTC+4:30 (IRDT)

Bamoti (Persian: بامتي, also Romanized as Bāmotī; also known as Bāmkotī) is a village in Harazpey-ye Jonubi Rural District, in the Central District of Amol County, Mazandaran Province, Iran. At the 2006 census, its population was 218, in 52 families.
