= Lati Kola =

Láti Kolâ لَــــتـی کِــلـا
- village
- Location within Iran
- Coordinates: 36°31′07″N 52°23′30″E
- Country: Iran
- Province: Mazandaran
- County: Amol
- Bakhsh: Central
- Rural District: Shahrak Sanati 40 shaheid District / Harazpey-ye Jonubi

Population (2019)
  - Total: 370
- Time zone: UTC+3:30 (IRST)
  - Summer (DST): UTC+4:30 (IRDT)
- Area code: 011

Lati Kola (Persian: لتی كلا, also Romanized as Latī Kolā) is a village in Harazpey-ye Jonubi Rural District, in the Central District of Amol County, Mazandaran Province, Iran. At the 2019 census, its population was 370, in 90 families.
