= Kharab-e Mian Rud =

Kharab-e Mian Rud خراب ميانرود
- Village
- Location within Iran
- Coordinates: 36°31′54″N 52°22′16″E
- Country: Iran
- Province: Mazandaran
- County: Amol
- Bakhsh: Central
- Rural District: Harazpey-ye Jonubi

Population (2006)
  - Total: 133
- Time zone: UTC+3:30 (IRST)
  - Summer (DST): UTC+4:30 (IRDT)

Kharab-e Mian Rud (Persian: خراب ميانرود, also Romanized as Kharāb-e Mīān Rūd; also known as Kharābeh-ye Mīān Rūd) is a village in Harazpey-ye Jonubi Rural District, in the Central District of Amol County, Mazandaran Province, Iran. At the 2006 census, its population was 133, in 37 families.
