= Aqa Mohammadabad =

Aqa Mohammadabad آقامحمد آباد
- Village
- Country: Iran
- Province: Mazandaran
- County: Amol
- Bakhsh: Central
- Rural District: Harazpey-ye Jonubi

Population (2006)
  - Total: 70
- Time zone: UTC+3:30 (IRST)
  - Summer (DST): UTC+4:30 (IRDT)

Aqa Mohammadabad (Persian: آقامحمد آباد, also Romanized as Āqā Moḩammadābād) is a village in Harazpey-ye Jonubi Rural District, in the Central District of Amol County, Mazandaran Province, Iran. At the 2006 census, its population was 70, in 19 families.
