= Sadin Kola =

Sadin Kola سعدين كلا
- Village
- Location within Iran
- Coordinates: 36°32′17″N 52°21′32″E
- Country: Iran
- Province: Mazandaran
- County: Amol
- Bakhsh: Central
- Rural District: Harazpey-ye Jonubi

Population (2006)
  - Total: 388
- Time zone: UTC+3:30 (IRST)
  - Summer (DST): UTC+4:30 (IRDT)

Sadin Kola (Persian: سعدين كلا, also Romanized as Sa‘dīn Kolā) is a village in Harazpey-ye Jonubi Rural District, in the Central District of Amol County, Mazandaran Province, Iran. At the 2006 census, its population was 388, in 105 families.
