= Ab Saraft =

Ab Saraft اب سرفت
- Village
- Location within Iran
- Coordinates: 36°31′12″N 52°23′58″E
- Country: Iran
- Province: Mazandaran
- County: Amol
- Bakhsh: Central
- Rural District: Harazpey-ye Jonubi

Population (2016)
  - Total: 190
- Time zone: UTC+3:30 (IRST)

Ab Saraft (Persian: اب سرفت, also Romanized as Āb Saraft, known in Mazandarani: Āb Saroft) is a village in Harazpey-ye Jonubi Rural District, in the Central District of Amol County, Mazandaran province, Iran. At the 2016 census, its population was 190, in 73 families.
