= Bakhtiar Koti =

Bakhtiar Koti بختياركتي
- Village
- Location within Iran
- Coordinates: 36°30′19″N 52°21′55″E
- Country: Iran
- Province: Mazandaran
- County: Amol
- Bakhsh: Central
- Rural District: Harazpey-ye Jonubi

Population (2006)
  - Total: 204
- Time zone: UTC+3:30 (IRST)
  - Summer (DST): UTC+4:30 (IRDT)

Bakhtiar Koti (Persian: بختياركتي, also Romanized as Bakhtīār Kotī) is a village in Harazpey-ye Jonubi Rural District, in the Central District of Amol County, Mazandaran Province, Iran. At the 2006 census, its population was 204, in 44 families.
