= Tajanjar =

Tajanjar (Persian: تجن جار) may refer to:

- Tajanjar-e Olya
- Tajanjar-e Sofla
