= Varka Deh =

Village in Mazandaran province, Iran

Varka Deh Persian: وركاده
- Village
- Location within Iran
- Coordinates: 36°31′40″N 52°14′41″E
- Country: Iran
- Province: Mazandaran
- County: Amol
- District: Central
- Rural District: Pain Khiyaban-e Litkuh

Population (2016)
  - Total: 974
- Time zone: UTC+3:30 (IRST)

Varka Deh (Persian: وركاده) (Note: Also romanized as Varkā Deh) is a village in Pain Khiyaban-e Litkuh Rural District of the Central District in Amol County, Mazandaran province, Iran.

== Demographics ==
=== Population ===
At the time of the 2006 National Census, the village's population was 954 in 214 households. The following census in 2011 counted 949 people in 277 households. The 2016 census measured the population of the village as 974 people in 331 households.
