= Ali Kola-ye Ahi =

Village in Mazandaran province, Iran

Ali Kola-ye Ahi Persian: عاليكلااهي
- Village
- Location within Iran
- Coordinates: 36°33′12″N 52°25′08″E
- Country: Iran
- Province: Mazandaran
- County: Amol
- District: Central
- Rural District: Harazpey-ye Jonubi

Population (2016)
  - Total: 555
- Time zone: UTC+3:30 (IRST)

Ali Kola-ye Ahi (Persian: عالیکلا آهی) (Note: Also romanized as ‘Alī Kolā-ye Āhī) is a village in Harazpey-ye Jonubi Rural District of the Central District in Amol County, Mazandaran province, Iran.

== Demographics ==
=== Population ===
At the time of the 2006 National Census, the village's population was 611 in 166 households. The following census in 2011 counted 605 people in 182 households. The 2016 census measured the population of the village as 555 people in 196 households.
