= Maskun =

Maskun may refer to:

- Monochromacy (in parts of Micronesia)
- Maskun, Iran, a village in Mazandaran Province, Iran
- Maskun Rural District, in Kerman Province, Iran
