= Darkapey =

Darkapey دركاپی
- Village
- Location within Iran
- Coordinates: 36°30′20″N 52°13′57″E
- Country: Iran
- Province: Mazandaran
- County: Amol
- Bakhsh: Central
- Rural District: Pain Khiyaban-e Litkuh

Population (2016)
  - Total: 139
- Time zone: UTC+3:30 (IRST)

Darkapey (Persian: دركاپی, also Romanized as Darkāpey) is a village in Pain Khiyaban-e Litkuh Rural District, in the Central District of Amol County, Mazandaran Province, Iran.

At the time of the 2006 National Census, the village's population was 190 in 60 households. The following census in 2011 counted 111 people in 33 households. The 2016 census measured the population of the village as 139 people in 46 households.
