= Sarhang Koti =

Sarhang Koti سرهنگ کتی
- Village
- Location within Iran
- Coordinates: 36°30′02″N 52°17′50″E
- Country: Iran
- Province: Mazandaran
- County: Amol
- Bakhsh: Central
- Rural District: Pain Khiyaban-e Litkuh

Population (2016)
  - Total: 226
- Time zone: UTC+3:30 (IRST)

Sarhang Koti (Persian: سرهنگ کتی, also Romanized as Sarhang Kotī) is a village in Pain Khiyaban-e Litkuh Rural District, in the Central District of Amol County, Mazandaran Province, Iran.

At the time of the 2006 National Census, the village's population was 216 in 51 households. The following census in 2011 counted 239 people in 61 households. The 2016 census measured the population of the village as 226 people in 73 households.
