= Siah Lash =

Siah Lash سياه لش
- Village
- Location within Iran
- Coordinates: 36°30′26″N 52°14′54″E
- Country: Iran
- Province: Mazandaran
- County: Amol
- Bakhsh: Central
- Rural District: Pain Khiyaban-e Litkuh

Population (2016)
  - Total: 457
- Time zone: UTC+3:30 (IRST)

Siah Lash (Persian: سياه لش, also Romanized as Sīāh Lash) is a village in Pain Khiyaban-e Litkuh Rural District, in the Central District of Amol County, Mazandaran Province, Iran.

At the time of the 2006 National Census, the village's population was 462 in 107 households. The following census in 2011 counted 443 people in 129 households. The 2016 census measured the population of the village as 457 people in 139 households.
