= Bezminan =

Village in Mazandaran province, Iran

Bezminan Persian: بزمينان
- Village
- Location within Iran
- Coordinates: 36°25′07″N 52°22′47″E
- Country: Iran
- Province: Mazandaran
- County: Amol
- District: Central
- Rural District: Dasht-e Sar-e Sofla

Population (2016)
  - Total: 882
- Time zone: UTC+3:30 (IRST)

Bezminan (Persian: بزمينان) (Note: Also romanized as Bezminan; also known as Bazmenān and Nīrmīnān) is a village in Dasht-e Sar-e Sofla Rural District of the Central District in Amol County, Mazandaran province, Iran.

== Demographics ==
=== Population ===
At the time of the 2006 National Census, the village's population was 1,012 in 253 households, when it was in Bala Khiyaban-e Litkuh Rural District. The following census in 2011 counted 953 people in 289 households, by which time the village had been separated from the rural district in the formation of Dasht-e Sar-e Sofla Rural District in the same district. The 2016 census measured the population of the village as 882 people in 305 households.
