= Kolaksar =

Village in Mazandaran province, Iran

Kolaksar Persian: کلاک سر
- Village
- Location within Iran
- Coordinates: 36°29′52″N 52°20′39″E
- Country: Iran
- Province: Mazandaran
- County: Amol
- District: Central
- Rural District: Pain Khiyaban-e Litkuh

Population (2016)
  - Total: 8,843
- Time zone: UTC+3:30 (IRST)

Kolaksar (Persian: کلاک سر) (Note: Also known as Kelāksar) is a northern suburb of Amol city and a village in Pain Khiyaban-e Litkuh Rural District of the Central District in Amol County, Mazandaran province, Iran.

== Demographics ==
=== Population ===
At the time of the 2006 National Census, the village's population was 4,914 in 1,344 households. The following census in 2011 counted 6,637 people in 2,050 households. The 2016 census measured the population of the village as 8,843 people in 2,910 households. It was the most populous village in its rural district.
