= Sang-e Bast, Mazandaran =

Village in Mazandaran province, Iran

Sang-e Bast Persian: سنگ بست
- Village
- Location within Iran
- Coordinates: 36°32′48″N 52°22′30″E
- Country: Iran
- Province: Mazandaran
- County: Amol
- District: Central
- Rural District: Harazpey-ye Jonubi

Population (2016)
  - Total: 409
- Time zone: UTC+3:30 (IRST)

Sang-e Bast (Persian: سنگ بست) is a village in Harazpey-ye Jonubi Rural District of the Central District in Amol County, Mazandaran province, Iran.

== Demographics ==
=== Population ===
At the time of the 2006 National Census, the village's population was 404 in 106 households. The following census in 2011 counted 411 people in 125 households. The 2016 census measured the population of the village as 409 people in 145 households.
