= Jamshidabad, Mazandaran =

Village in Mazandaran province, Iran

Sang-e Bast Persian: جمشيداباد
- Village
- Location within Iran
- Coordinates: 36°31′18″N 52°23′22″E
- Country: Iran
- Province: Mazandaran
- County: Amol
- District: Central
- Rural District: Harazpey-ye Jonubi

Population (2016)
  - Total: 421
- Time zone: UTC+3:30 (IRST)

Jamshidabad (Persian: جمشيداباد) (Note: Also romanized as Jamshīdābād) is a village in Harazpey-ye Jonubi Rural District of the Central District in Amol County, Mazandaran province, Iran.

Most of the people in the village are farmers, growing crops such as rice and citrus fruit; some of them work in the city of Amol. The village's water is supplied from the Haraz River. The Chehel Shahid Industrial Park is located here, as well as a mosque and a Hussainiyeh.

== Demographics ==
=== Language ===
The people of Jamshidabad speak Mazandarani and are Muslims who follow the Shiite religion.

=== Population ===
At the time of the 2006 National Census, the village's population was 361 in 89 households. The following census in 2011 counted 337 people in 96 households. The 2016 census measured the population of the village as 421 people in 138 households.
