= Tajanak, Amol =

Village in Mazandaran province, Iran

Tajanak Persian: تجنك
- Village
- Location within Iran
- Coordinates: 36°30′47″N 52°17′38″E
- Country: Iran
- Province: Mazandaran
- County: Amol
- District: Central
- Rural District: Pain Khiyaban-e Litkuh

Population (2016)
  - Total: 534
- Time zone: UTC+3:30 (IRST)

Tajanak (Persian: تجنك) (Note: Also known as Tajnīk) is a village in Pain Khiyaban-e Litkuh Rural District of the Central District in Amol County, Mazandaran province, Iran.

== Demographics ==
=== Population ===
At the time of the 2006 National Census, the village's population was 530 in 125 households. The following census in 2011 counted 499 people in 149 households. The 2016 census measured the population of the village as 534 people in 174 households.
