= Mian Mahalleh, Mazandaran =

Village in Mazandaran province, Iran

Mian Mahalleh Persian: ميان محله
- Village
- Location within Iran
- Country: Iran
- Province: Mazandaran
- County: Amol
- District: Central
- Rural District: Dasht-e Sar-e Sofla

Population (2016)
  - Total: 285
- Time zone: UTC+3:30 (IRST)

Mian Mahalleh (Persian: ميان محله) (Note: Also romanized as Mīān Maḩalleh) is a village in Dasht-e Sar-e Sofla Rural District of the Central District in Amol County, Mazandaran province, Iran.

== Demographics ==
=== Population ===
At the time of the 2006 National Census, the village's population was 213 in 57 households, when it was in Bala Khiyaban-e Litkuh Rural District. The following census in 2011 counted 277 people in 82 households, by which time the village had been separated from the rural district in the formation of Dasht-e Sar-e Sofla Rural District in the same district. The 2016 census measured the population of the village as 285 people in 87 households.
