= Dar Kola, Amol =

Village in Mazandaran province, Iran

Dar Kola Persian: داركلا
- Village
- Location within Iran
- Coordinates: 36°30′44″N 52°18′07″E
- Country: Iran
- Province: Mazandaran
- County: Amol
- District: Central
- Rural District: Pain Khiyaban-e Litkuh

Population (2016)
  - Total: 586
- Time zone: UTC+3:30 (IRST)

Dar Kola (Persian: داركلا) (Note: Also romanized as Dār Kolā; also known as Dārā Kolā and Dārāb Kolā) is a village in Pain Khiyaban-e Litkuh Rural District of the Central District in Amol County, Mazandaran province, Iran.

== Demographics ==
=== Population ===
At the time of the 2006 National Census, the village's population was 539 in 140 households. The following census in 2011 counted 554 people in 167 households. The 2016 census measured the population of the village as 586 people in 199 households.
