= Kamangar Kola, Harazpey-ye Jonubi =

Village in Mazandaran province, Iran

Kamangar Kola Persian: كمانگركلا
- Village
- Location within Iran
- Coordinates: 36°29′51″N 52°22′57″E
- Country: Iran
- Province: Mazandaran
- County: Amol
- District: Central
- Rural District: Harazpey-ye Jonubi

Population (2016)
  - Total: 1,615
- Time zone: UTC+3:30 (IRST)

Kamangar Kola (Persian: كمانگركلا) (Note: Also romanized as Kamāngar Kolā) is a village in Harazpey-ye Jonubi Rural District of the Central District in Amol County, Mazandaran province, Iran.

== Demographics ==
=== Population ===
At the time of the 2006 National Census, the village's population was 1,293 in 307 households. The following census in 2011 counted 1,215 people in 364 households. The 2016 census measured the population of the village as 1,615 people in 537 households. It was the most populous village in its rural district.

== Overview ==
Kamangar Kola is small town, with many amenities including a health center and a hospital, three bakeries, two cemeteries, a football field, and a volleyball court, 15 supermarkets, three butchers, four taxis, and eight rivers inside the village. There are 450 hectares of agricultural land, 16 livestock breeding cattle, sheep, horses, and 8 breeding poultry broiler and laying hens, two large mosques and sacred sites.
