= Pawlak =

Pawlak is a Polish surname, it may refer to:

== People ==
- Aleksander Pawlak (born 2001), Polish footballer
- Alicja Pawlak, Polish footballer
- Joanna Pawlak, Polish equestrian
- Brett Pawlak, American cinematographer
- Krzysztof Pawlak (born 1958), retired Polish football player
- Mariusz Pawlak (born 1972), retired Polish professional footballer
- Mark Pawlak (born 1948), Polish-American poet and educator
- Mirosław Pawlak (born 1942), Polish politician
- Paul Pawlak, Sr., American politician
- Paul Pawlak (born 1940), former American football coach in the United States
- Rafał Pawlak, Polish football player and manager
- Stanisław Pawlak (born 1933), Polish diplomat and international law scholar
- Szymon Pawlak (born 1987), Polish footballer
- Waldemar Pawlak (born 1959), Polish politician
  - First Cabinet of Waldemar Pawlak (1992), a Polish government
  - Second Cabinet of Waldemar Pawlak (1993–1995), a Polish government
- Zdzisław Pawlak, inventor of the negabinary (-2 base) numeral system used in UMC computers

== See also ==
- Palak (disambiguation)
- Polak
