= Tirkan =

Tirkan or Tirekan or Tirakan or Tir Kan (Persian: تيركان or تيركن) may refer to:

- Tir Kan, Mazandaran (تيركان - Tīr Kān)
- Tirkan, Mazandaran (تيركن - Tīrkan)
