= Rudbar, Mazandaran =

Village in Mazandaran province, Iran

Rudbar Persian: رودبار
- Village
- Location within Iran
- Coordinates: 36°33′51″N 52°21′52″E
- Country: Iran
- Province: Mazandaran
- County: Amol
- District: Central
- Rural District: Harazpey-ye Jonubi

Population (2016)
  - Total: 972
- Time zone: UTC+3:30 (IRST)

Rudbar (Persian: رودبار) (Note: Also romanized as Rūdbār) is a village in Harazpey-ye Jonubi Rural District of the Central District in Amol County, Mazandaran province, Iran.

== Demographics ==
=== Population ===
At the time of the 2006 National Census, the village's population was 1,027 in 277 households. The following census in 2011 counted 960 people in 292 households. The 2016 census measured the population of the village as 972 people in 322 households.
