= Kordkoti =

Kordkoti کردکتی
- Village
- Location within Iran
- Coordinates: 36°29′04″N 52°18′46″E
- Country: Iran
- Province: Mazandaran
- County: Amol
- Bakhsh: Central
- Rural District: Pain Khiyaban-e Litkuh

Population (2016)
  - Total: 191
- Time zone: UTC+3:30 (IRST)

Kordkoti (Persian: کردکتی, also Romanized as Kordkotī) is a village in Pain Khiyaban-e Litkuh Rural District, in the Central District of Amol County, Mazandaran Province, Iran.

At the time of the 2006 National Census, the village's population was 152 in 40 households. The following census in 2011 counted 152 people in 43 households. The 2016 census measured the population of the village as 191 people in 60 households.
