= Pasha Kola, Harazpey-ye Jonubi =

Village in Mazandaran province, Iran

Pasha Kola Persian: پاشاكلا
- Village
- Location within Iran
- Coordinates: 36°29′40″N 52°22′49″E
- Country: Iran
- Province: Mazandaran
- County: Amol
- District: Central
- Rural District: Harazpey-ye Jonubi

Population (2016)
  - Total: 492
- Time zone: UTC+3:30 (IRST)

Pasha Kola (Persian: پاشاكلا) (Note: Also romanized as Pāshā Kolā) is a village in Harazpey-ye Jonubi Rural District of the Central District in Amol County, Mazandaran province, Iran.

== Demographics ==
=== Population ===
At the time of the 2006 National Census, the village's population was 229 in 62 households. The following census in 2011 counted 385 people in 111 households. The 2016 census measured the population of the village as 492 people in 156 households.
