= Sayij Mahalleh =

Village in Mazandaran province, Iran

Sayij Mahalleh Persian: سائيج محله
- Village
- Location within Iran
- Coordinates: 36°27′28″N 52°17′19″E
- Country: Iran
- Province: Mazandaran
- County: Amol
- District: Central
- Rural District: Pain Khiyaban-e Litkuh

Population (2016)
  - Total: 1,359
- Time zone: UTC+3:30 (IRST)

Sayij Mahalleh (Persian: سائيج محله) (Note: Also romanized as Sāyīj Maḩalleh; also known as Sā’ch Maḩalleh, Sag Maḩalleh, and Saj Maḩalleh) is a village in Pain Khiyaban-e Litkuh Rural District of the Central District in Amol County, Mazandaran province, Iran.

== Demographics ==
=== Population ===
At the time of the 2006 National Census, the village's population was 1,325 in 342 households. The following census in 2011 counted 1,354 people in 409 households. The 2016 census measured the population of the village as 1,359 people in 447 households.
