= Rukesh =

Rukesh روکش
- Village
- Location within Iran
- Coordinates: 36°29′16″N 52°16′00″E
- Country: Iran
- Province: Mazandaran
- County: Amol
- Bakhsh: Central
- Rural District: Pain Khiyaban-e Litkuh

Population (2016)
  - Total: 370
- Time zone: UTC+3:30 (IRST)

Rukesh (Persian: روکش, also Romanized as Rūkesh) is a village in Pain Khiyaban-e Litkuh Rural District, in the Central District of Amol County, Mazandaran Province, Iran.

At the time of the 2006 National Census, the village's population was 391 in 93 households. The following census in 2011 counted 354 people in 103 households. The 2016 census measured the population of the village as 370 people in 119 households.
