= Sharm Kola =

Village in Mazandaran province, Iran

Sharm Kola Persian: شرم كلا
- Village
- Location within Iran
- Coordinates: 36°29′12″N 52°23′02″E
- Country: Iran
- Province: Mazandaran
- County: Amol
- District: Central
- Rural District: Harazpey-ye Jonubi

Population (2016)
  - Total: 839
- Time zone: UTC+3:30 (IRST)

Sharm Kola (Persian: شرم كلا) (Note: Also romanized as Sharm Kolā) is a village in Harazpey-ye Jonubi Rural District of the Central District in Amol County, Mazandaran province, Iran.

== Demographics ==
=== Population ===
At the time of the 2006 National Census, the village's population was 661 in 167 households. The following census in 2011 counted 760 people in 229 households. The 2016 census measured the population of the village as 839 people in 277 households.
