= Galan, Mazandaran =

Galan گلان
- Village
- Location within Iran
- Coordinates: 36°29′01″N 52°15′29″E
- Country: Iran
- Province: Mazandaran
- County: Amol
- Bakhsh: Central
- Rural District: Pain Khiyaban-e Litkuh

Population (2016)
  - Total: 341
- Time zone: UTC+3:30 (IRST)

Galan (Persian: گلان, also Romanized as Galān; also known as Galūn) is a village in Pain Khiyaban-e Litkuh Rural District, in the Central District of Amol County, Mazandaran Province, Iran.

At the time of the 2006 National Census, the village's population was 332 in 81 households. The following census in 2011 counted 324 people in 95 households. The 2016 census measured the population of the village as 341 people in 111 households.
