= Qajar Mahalleh =

Qajar Mahalleh قجرمحله
- Village
- Location within Iran
- Coordinates: 36°29′38″N 52°19′24″E
- Country: Iran
- Province: Mazandaran
- County: Amol
- Bakhsh: Central
- Rural District: Pain Khiyaban-e Litkuh

Population (2016)
  - Total: 388
- Time zone: UTC+3:30 (IRST)

Qajar Mahalleh (Persian: قجرمحله, also Romanized as Qajar Maḩalleh) is a village in Pain Khiyaban-e Litkuh Rural District, in the Central District of Amol County, Mazandaran Province, Iran.

At the time of the 2006 National Census, the village's population was 261 in 65 households. The following census in 2011 counted 331 people in 95 households. The 2016 census measured the population of the village as 388 people in 122 households.
