= Nowabad, Amol =

Nowabad نوآباد
- Village
- Location within Iran
- Coordinates: 36°31′19″N 52°15′24″E
- Country: Iran
- Province: Mazandaran
- County: Amol
- Bakhsh: Central
- Rural District: Pain Khiyaban-e Litkuh

Population (2016)
  - Total: 455
- Time zone: UTC+3:30 (IRST)

Nowabad (Persian: نوآباد, also Romanized as Nowābād) is a village in Pain Khiyaban-e Litkuh Rural District, in the Central District of Amol County, Mazandaran Province, Iran.

At the time of the 2006 National Census, the village's population was 298 in 80 households. The following census in 2011 counted 340 people in 96 households. The 2016 census measured the population of the village as 455 people in 138 households.
