= Mian Rud, Harazpey-ye Jonubi =

Mian Rud ميانرود
- Village
- Location within Iran
- Coordinates: 36°33′06″N 52°20′20″E
- Country: Iran
- Province: Mazandaran
- County: Amol
- Bakhsh: Central
- Rural District: Harazpey-ye Jonubi

Population (2006)
  - Total: 263
- Time zone: UTC+3:30 (IRST)
  - Summer (DST): UTC+4:30 (IRDT)

Mian Rud (Persian: ميانرود, also Romanized as Mīān Rūd; also known as Mīān Rūd-e Harāzpey) is a village in Harazpey-ye Jonubi Rural District, in the Central District of Amol County, Mazandaran Province, Iran. At the 2006 census, its population was 263, in 72 families.
