= Valisdeh =

Village in Mazandaran province, Iran

Valisdeh Persian: وليس ده
- Village
- Location within Iran
- Coordinates: 36°27′38″N 52°16′19″E
- Country: Iran
- Province: Mazandaran
- County: Amol
- District: Central
- Rural District: Pain Khiyaban-e Litkuh

Population (2016)
  - Total: 681
- Time zone: UTC+3:30 (IRST)

Valisdeh (Persian: وليس ده) (Note: Also romanized as Valīsdeh and Velīsdeh) is a village in Pain Khiyaban-e Litkuh Rural District of the Central District in Amol County, Mazandaran province, Iran.

== Demographics ==
=== Population ===
At the time of the 2006 National Census, the village's population was 517 in 316 households. The following census in 2011 counted 607 people in 184 households. The 2016 census measured the population of the village as 681 people in 229 households.
