= Kuk Deh =

Village in Mazandaran province, Iran

Kuk Deh Persian: كوكده
- Village
- Location within Iran
- Coordinates: 36°29′26″N 52°15′10″E
- Country: Iran
- Province: Mazandaran
- County: Amol
- District: Central
- Rural District: Pain Khiyaban-e Litkuh

Population (2016)
  - Total: 894
- Time zone: UTC+3:30 (IRST)

Kuk Deh (Persian: كوكده) (Note: Also romanized as Kūk Deh) is a village in Pain Khiyaban-e Litkuh Rural District of the Central District in Amol County, Mazandaran province, Iran.

== Demographics ==
=== Population ===
At the time of the 2006 National Census, the village's population was 841 in 215 households. The following census in 2011 counted 873 people in 259 households. The 2016 census measured the population of the village as 894 people in 305 households.
