= Aghuz Koti =

Aghuz Koti or Aghuzkati (Persian: اغوزكتي) may refer to:

- Aghuz Koti, Amol
- Aghuz Koti, Nur
- Aghuz Koti, Ramsar
- Aghuz Koti, Tonekabon
