= Naram, Iran =

Naram (Persian: نرم) in Iran may refer to:

- Naram, Mazandaran
- Naram, South Khorasan
