= Kola Safa =

Village in Mazandaran province, Iran

Kola Safa Persian: كلاصفا
- Village
- Location within Iran
- Coordinates: 36°31′05″N 52°19′32″E
- Country: Iran
- Province: Mazandaran
- County: Amol
- District: Central
- Rural District: Harazpey-ye Jonubi

Population (2016)
  - Total: 945
- Time zone: UTC+3:30 (IRST)

Kola Safa (Persian: كلاصفا) (Note: Also romanized as Kolā Şafā; also known as Kolah Şafā) is a village in Harazpey-ye Jonubi Rural District of the Central District in Amol County, Mazandaran province, Iran.

== Demographics ==
=== Population ===
At the time of the 2006 National Census, the village's population was 811 in 214 households. The following census in 2011 counted 823 people in 267 households. The 2016 census measured the population of the village as 945 people in 309 households.
