= Shah Mahalleh =

Shah Mahalleh (Persian: شاه محله) may refer to:

- Shah Mahalleh, Gilan
- Shah Mahalleh, Mazandaran
