= Zarundeh =

Zarundeh زارونده
- Village
- Location within Iran
- Coordinates: 36°28′13″N 52°18′22″E
- Country: Iran
- Province: Mazandaran
- County: Amol
- Bakhsh: Central
- Rural District: Pain Khiyaban-e Litkuh

Population (2016)
  - Total: 193
- Time zone: UTC+3:30 (IRST)

Zarundeh (Persian: زارونده, also Romanized as Zārūndeh) is a village in Pain Khiyaban-e Litkuh Rural District, in the Central District of Amol County, Mazandaran Province, Iran.

At the time of the 2006 National Census, the village's population was 162 in 45 households. The following census in 2011 counted 135 people in 45 households. The 2016 census measured the population of the village as 193 people in 62 households.
