= Hoseynabad, Pain Khiyaban-e Litkuh =

Village in Mazandaran province, Iran

Hoseynabad Persian: حسين اباد
- Village
- Location within Iran
- Coordinates: 36°31′09″N 52°16′16″E
- Country: Iran
- Province: Mazandaran
- County: Amol
- District: Central
- Rural District: Pain Khiyaban-e Litkuh

Population (2016)
  - Total: 991
- Time zone: UTC+3:30 (IRST)

Hoseynabad (Persian: حسين اباد) (Note: Also romanized as Ḩoseynābād) is a village in Pain Khiyaban-e Litkuh Rural District of the Central District in Amol County, Mazandaran province, Iran.

== Demographics ==
=== Population ===
At the time of the 2006 National Census, the village's population was 860 in 230 households. The following census in 2011 counted 931 people in 283 households. The 2016 census measured the population of the village as 991 people in 314 households.
