= Kuseh Raz =

Village in Mazandaran province, Iran

Kuseh Raz Persian: كوسه رز
- Village
- Location within Iran
- Coordinates: 36°32′02″N 52°15′26″E
- Country: Iran
- Province: Mazandaran
- County: Amol
- District: Central
- Rural District: Pain Khiyaban-e Litkuh

Population (2016)
  - Total: 572
- Time zone: UTC+3:30 (IRST)

Kuseh Raz (Persian: كوسه رز) (Note: Also romanized as Kūseh Raz) is a village in Pain Khiyaban-e Litkuh Rural District of the Central District in Amol County, Mazandaran province, Iran.

== Demographics ==
=== Population ===
At the time of the 2006 National Census, the village's population was 591 in 160 households. The following census in 2011 counted 595 people in 184 households. The 2016 census measured the population of the village as 572 people in 195 households.
