= Chau Sar Mahalleh =

Chau Sar Mahalleh چائوسر محله
- Village
- Location within Iran
- Coordinates: 36°30′00″N 52°17′26″E
- Country: Iran
- Province: Mazandaran
- County: Amol
- Bakhsh: Central
- Rural District: Pain Khiyaban-e Litkuh

Population (2016)
  - Total: 63
- Time zone: UTC+3:30 (IRST)

Chau Sar Mahalleh (Persian: چائوسر محله, also Romanized as Chā’ū Sar Maḩalleh) is a village in Pain Khiyaban-e Litkuh Rural District, in the Central District of Amol County, Mazandaran Province, Iran.

At the time of the 2006 National Census, the village's population was 67 in 14 households. The following census in 2011 counted 81 people in 20 households. The 2016 census measured the population of the village as 63 people in 21 households.
