= Tork Kola =

Village in Mazandaran province, Iran

Tork Kola Persian: ترک‌کلا
- Village
- Location within Iran
- Coordinates: 36°25′46″N 52°21′22″E
- Country: Iran
- Province: Mazandaran
- County: Amol
- District: Central
- Rural District: Dasht-e Sar-e Sofla

Population (2016)
  - Total: 1,312
- Time zone: UTC+3:30 (IRST)

Tork Kola (Persian: ترك كلا) (Note: Also romanized as Tork Kolā) is a village in, and the capital of, Dasht-e Sar-e Sofla Rural District in the Central District of Amol County, Mazandaran province, Iran.

== Demographics ==
=== Population ===
At the time of the 2006 National Census, the village's population was 1,032 in 270 households, when it was in Bala Khiyaban-e Litkuh Rural District. The following census in 2011 counted 1,245 people in 407 households, by which time the village had been separated from the rural district in the formation of Dasht-e Sar-e Sofla Rural District in the same district. The 2016 census measured the population of the village as 1,312 people in 425 households.
