= Pishgun =

Pishgun پيشگون
- Village
- Location within Iran
- Coordinates: 36°30′30″N 52°16′44″E
- Country: Iran
- Province: Mazandaran
- County: Amol
- Bakhsh: Central
- Rural District: Pain Khiyaban-e Litkuh

Population (2016)
  - Total: 260
- Time zone: UTC+3:30 (IRST)

Pishgun (Persian: پيشگون, also Romanized as Pīshgūn) is a village in Pain Khiyaban-e Litkuh Rural District, in the Central District of Amol County, Mazandaran Province, Iran.

At the time of the 2006 National Census, the village's population was 256 in 57 households. The following census in 2011 counted 269 people in 77 households. The 2016 census measured the population of the village as 260 people in 88 households.
