= Rafiabad, Mazandaran =

Village in Mazandaran province, Iran

Rafiabad Persian: رفيع اباد
- Village
- Location within Iran
- Coordinates: 36°32′50″N 52°23′28″E
- Country: Iran
- Province: Mazandaran
- County: Amol
- District: Central
- Rural District: Harazpey-ye Jonubi

Population (2016)
  - Total: 522
- Time zone: UTC+3:30 (IRST)

Rafiabad (Persian: رفيع اباد) (Note: Also romanized as Rafī‘ābād) is a village in Harazpey-ye Jonubi Rural District of the Central District in Amol County, Mazandaran province, Iran.

== Demographics ==
=== Population ===
At the time of the 2006 National Census, the village's population was 528 in 125 households. The following census in 2011 counted 549 people in 148 households. The 2016 census measured the population of the village as 522 people in 166 households.
