= Qoroq, Amol =

Village in Mazandaran province, Iran

Qoroq Persian: قرق
- Village
- Location within Iran
- Coordinates: 36°29′24″N 52°21′13″E
- Country: Iran
- Province: Mazandaran
- County: Amol
- District: Central
- Rural District: Harazpey-ye Jonubi

Population (2016)
  - Total: 1,566
- Time zone: UTC+3:30 (IRST)

Qoroq (Persian: قرق) (Note: Also known as Sidehel and Yarqoroq) is a village in Harazpey-ye Jonubi Rural District of the Central District in Amol County, Mazandaran province, Iran.

== Demographics ==
=== Population ===
At the time of the 2006 National Census, the village's population was 1,084 in 282 households. The following census in 2011 counted 905 people in 261 households. The 2016 census measured the population of the village as 1,566 people in 515 households.
