= Aghuzbon, Amol =

Village in Mazandaran province, Iran

Aghuzbon Persian: آغوزبن
- Village
- Location within Iran
- Coordinates: 36°26′56″N 52°17′50″E
- Country: Iran
- Province: Mazandaran
- County: Amol
- District: Central
- Rural District: Pain Khiyaban-e Litkuh

Population (2016)
  - Total: 874
- Time zone: UTC+3:30 (IRST)

Aghuzbon (Persian: آغوزبن) (Note: Also romanized as Āghūzbon; also known as Āghūzband) is a village in Pain Khiyaban-e Litkuh Rural District of the Central District in Amol County, Mazandaran province, Iran.

== Demographics ==
=== Population ===
At the time of the 2006 National Census, the village's population was 683 in 184 households. The following census in 2011 counted 788 people in 241 households. The 2016 census measured the population of the village as 874 people in 291 households.
