= Karchi Kola =

Village in Mazandaran province, Iran

Karchi Kola Persian: كارچي كلا
- Village
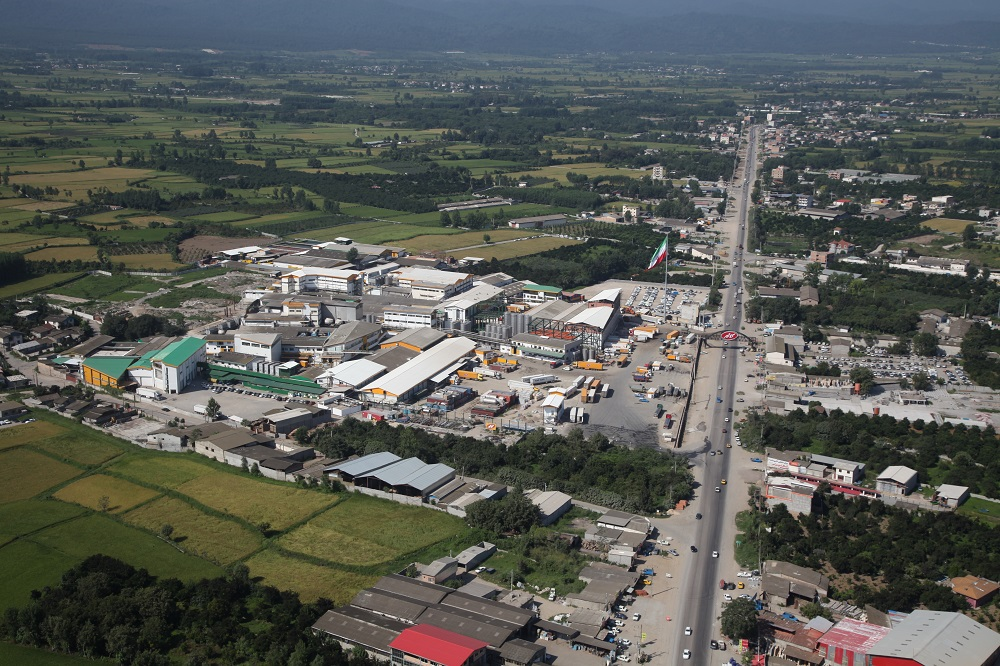
- Areal view of the village of Karchi Kola

- Location within Iran
- Coordinates: 36°27′09″N 52°19′02″E
- Country: Iran
- Province: Mazandaran
- County: Amol
- District: Central
- Rural District: Pain Khiyaban-e Litkuh

Population (2016)
  - Total: 393
- Time zone: UTC+3:30 (IRST)

Karchi Kola (Persian: كارچي كلا) (Note: Also romanized as Kārchī Kolā) is a village in Pain Khiyaban-e Litkuh Rural District of the Central District in Amol County, Mazandaran province, Iran.

== Demographics ==
=== Population ===
At the time of the 2006 National Census, the village's population was 200 in 53 households, when it was in Bala Khiyaban-e Litkuh Rural District. The following census in 2011 counted 130 people in 43 households, by which time the village had been transferred to Pain Khiyaban-e Litkuh Rural District. The 2016 census measured the population of the village as 393 people in 124 households.
