= Ansari Mahalleh =

Ansari Mahalleh انصاری محله
- Village
- Location within Iran
- Coordinates: 36°28′52″N 52°19′27″E
- Country: Iran
- Province: Mazandaran
- County: Amol
- Bakhsh: Central
- Rural District: Pain Khiyaban-e Litkuh

Population (2016)
  - Total: 134
- Time zone: UTC+3:30 (IRST)

Ansari Mahalleh (Persian: انصاری محله, also Romanized as Anşārī Maḩalleh) is a village in Pain Khiyaban-e Litkuh Rural District, in the Central District of Amol County, Mazandaran Province, Iran.

At the time of the 2006 National Census, the village's population was 92 in 21 households. The following census in 2011 counted 105 people in 30 households. The 2016 census measured the population of the village as 134 people in 44 households.
