= Owjiabad =

Village in Mazandaran province, Iran

Owjiabad Persian: اوجي آباد
- Village
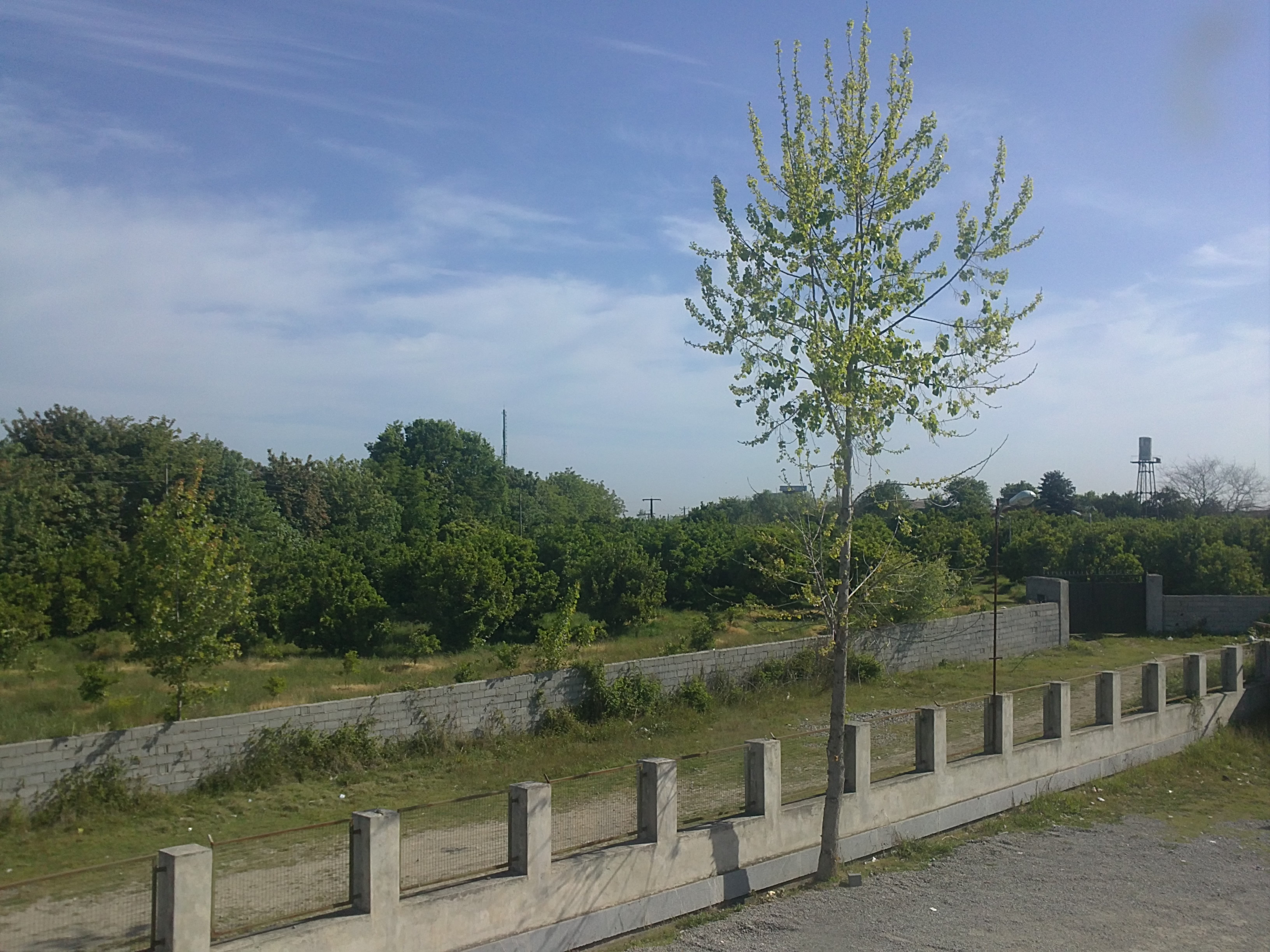

- Location within Iran
- Coordinates: 36°31′12″N 52°20′50″E
- Country: Iran
- Province: Mazandaran
- County: Amol
- District: Central
- Rural District: Harazpey-ye Jonubi

Population (2016)
  - Total: 1,090
- Time zone: UTC+3:30 (IRST)

Owjiabad (Persian: اوجی آباد) (Note: Also romanized as Owjīābād) is a village in Harazpey-ye Jonubi Rural District of the Central District in Amol County, Mazandaran province, Iran.

== Demographics ==
=== Population ===
At the time of the 2006 National Census, the village's population was 1,050 in 277 households. The following census in 2011 counted 1,088 people in 336 households. The 2016 census measured the population of the village as 1,090 people in 358 households.
