= Konesi =

Village in Mazandaran province, Iran

Konesi Persian: كنسي
- Village
- Location within Iran
- Coordinates: 36°26′18″N 52°22′05″E
- Country: Iran
- Province: Mazandaran
- County: Amol
- District: Central
- Rural District: Dasht-e Sar-e Sofla

Population (2016)
  - Total: 871
- Time zone: UTC+3:30 (IRST)

Konesi (Persian: كنسي) (Note: Also romanized as Kenesī) is a village in Dasht-e Sar-e Sofla Rural District of the Central District in Amol County, Mazandaran province, Iran.

== Demographics ==
=== Population ===
At the time of the 2006 National Census, the village's population was 874 in 213 households, when it was in Bala Khiyaban-e Litkuh Rural District. The following census in 2011 counted 851 people in 240 households, by which time the village had been separated from the rural district in the formation of Dasht-e Sar-e Sofla Rural District in the same district. The 2016 census measured the population of the village as 871 people in 281 households.
