= Jafarabad, Amol =

Village in Mazandaran province, Iran

Jafarabad Persian: جعفراباد
- Village
- Location within Iran
- Coordinates: 36°31′21″N 52°21′26″E
- Country: Iran
- Province: Mazandaran
- County: Amol
- District: Central
- Rural District: Harazpey-ye Jonubi

Population (2016)
  - Total: 614
- Time zone: UTC+3:30 (IRST)

Jafarabad (Persian: جعفراباد) (Note: Also romanized as Ja‘farābād) is a village in Harazpey-ye Jonubi Rural District of the Central District in Amol County, Mazandaran province, Iran.

== Demographics ==
=== Population ===
At the time of the 2006 National Census, the village's population was 507 in 138 households. The following census in 2011 counted 570 people in 181 households. The 2016 census measured the population of the village as 614 people in 196 households.
