= Aski Mahalleh, Harazpey-ye Jonubi =

Village in Mazandaran province, Iran

Aski Mahalleh Persian: اسكي محله
- Village
- Location within Iran
- Coordinates: 36°31′50″N 52°20′36″E
- Country: Iran
- Province: Mazandaran
- County: Amol
- District: Central
- Rural District: Harazpey-ye Jonubi

Population (2016)
  - Total: 755
- Time zone: UTC+3:30 (IRST)

Aski Mahalleh (Persian: اسكي محله) (Note: Also romanized as Askī Maḩalleh; also known as Ashkī Maḩalleh) is a village in Harazpey-ye Jonubi Rural District of the Central District in Amol County, Mazandaran province, Iran.

== Demographics ==
=== Population ===
At the time of the 2006 National Census, the village's population was 770 in 199 households. The following census in 2011 counted 770 people in 241 households. The 2016 census measured the population of the village as 755 people in 253 households.
