= Khas Kola =

Village in Mazandaran province, Iran

Khas Kola Persian: خاص كلا
- Village
- Location within Iran
- Coordinates: 36°26′02″N 52°20′08″E
- Country: Iran
- Province: Mazandaran
- County: Amol
- District: Central
- Rural District: Dasht-e Sar-e Sofla

Population (2016)
  - Total: 544
- Time zone: UTC+3:30 (IRST)

Khas Kola (Persian: خاص كلا) (Note: Also romanized as Khāş Kolā and Khāşekolā) is a village in Dasht-e Sar-e Sofla Rural District of the Central District in Amol County, Mazandaran province, Iran.

== Demographics ==
=== Population ===
At the time of the 2006 National Census, the village's population was 501 in 129 households, when it was in Bala Khiyaban-e Litkuh Rural District. The following census in 2011 counted 515 people in 149 households, by which time the village had been separated from the rural district in the formation of Dasht-e Sar-e Sofla Rural District in the same district. The 2016 census measured the population of the village as 544 people in 183 households.
