= Marandeh =

Village in Mazandaran province, Iran

Marandeh Persian: مرانده
- Village
- Location within Iran
- Coordinates: 36°29′56″N 52°15′55″E
- Country: Iran
- Province: Mazandaran
- County: Amol
- District: Central
- Rural District: Pain Khiyaban-e Litkuh

Population (2016)
  - Total: 293
- Time zone: UTC+3:30 (IRST)

Marandeh (Persian: مرانده) (Note: Also romanized as Marāndeh) is a village in, and the capital of, Pain Khiyaban-e Litkuh Rural District in the Central District of Amol County, Mazandaran province, Iran.

== Demographics ==
=== Population ===
At the time of the 2006 National Census, the village's population was 283 in 67 households. The following census in 2011 counted 264 people in 74 households. The 2016 census measured the population of the village as 293 people in 97 households.
