= Anj Pol =

Anj Pol انج پل
- Village
- Location within Iran
- Coordinates: 36°28′09″N 52°17′13″E
- Country: Iran
- Province: Mazandaran
- County: Amol
- Bakhsh: Central
- Rural District: Pain Khiyaban-e Litkuh

Population (2016)
  - Total: 305
- Time zone: UTC+3:30 (IRST)

Anj Pol (Persian: انج پل; also known as Anjeh Pol and Anjehpol) is a village in Pain Khiyaban-e Litkuh Rural District, in the Central District of Amol County, Mazandaran Province, Iran.

At the time of the 2006 National Census, the village's population was 310 in 79 households. The following census in 2011 counted 282 people in 77 households. The 2016 census measured the population of the village as 305 people in 98 households.
