= Kaseb Mahalleh =

Kaseb Mahalleh كاسب محله
- Village
- Location within Iran
- Coordinates: 36°30′01″N 52°16′56″E
- Country: Iran
- Province: Mazandaran
- County: Amol
- Bakhsh: Central
- Rural District: Pain Khiyaban-e Litkuh

Population (2016)
  - Total: 335
- Time zone: UTC+3:30 (IRST)

Kaseb Mahalleh (Persian: كاسب محله, also Romanized as Kāseb Maḩalleh) is a village in northern Iran. It is located in Pain Khiyaban-e Litkuh Rural District, in the Central District of Amol County, Mazandaran Province.

At the time of the 2006 National Census, the village's population was 294 in 68 households. The following census in 2011 counted 312 people in 90 households. The 2016 census measured the population of the village as 335 people in 118 households.
