= Ziarud =

Village in Mazandaran province, Iran

Ziarud Persian: زيارود
- Village
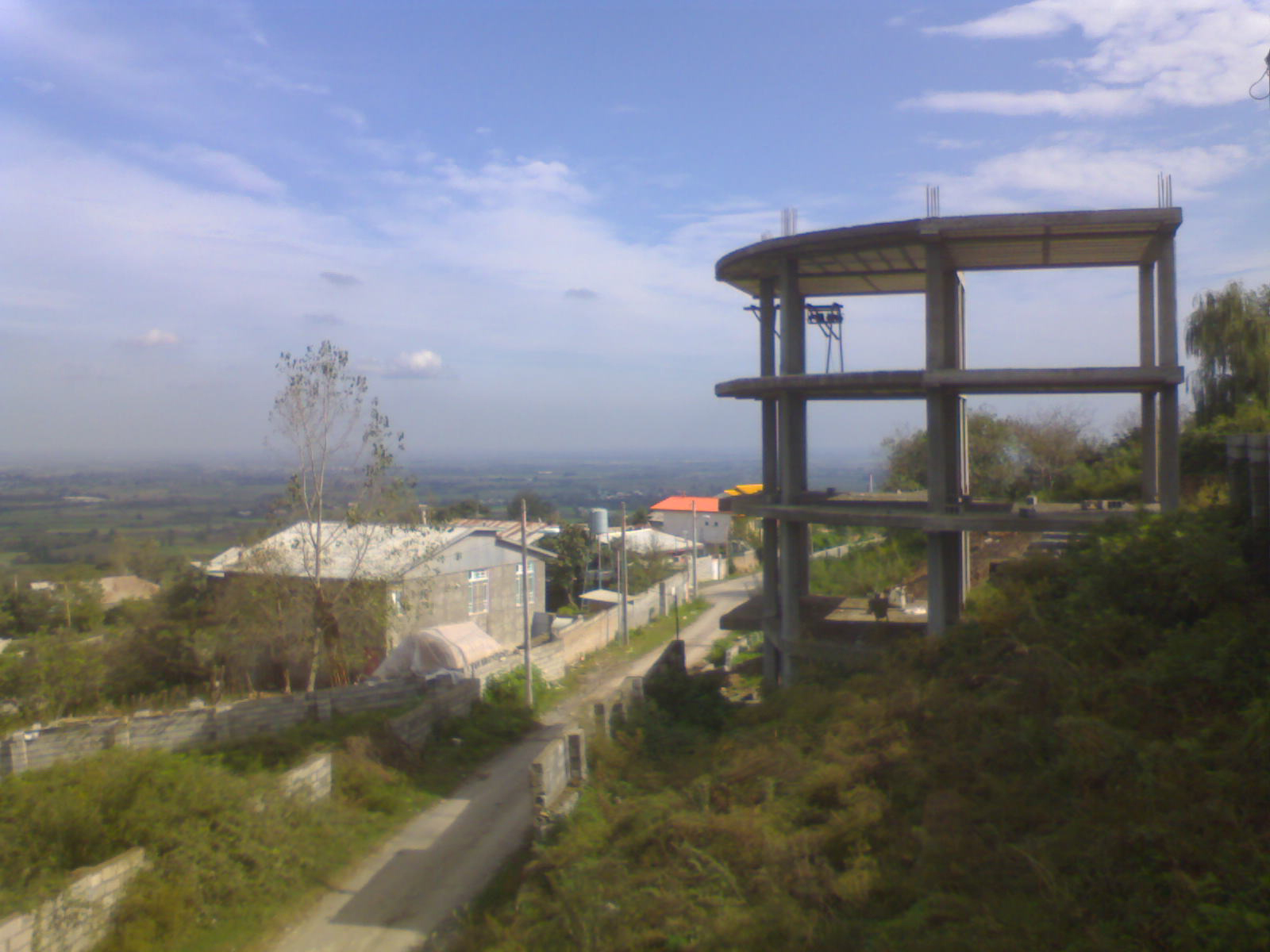
- The village of Ziarud

- Location within Iran
- Coordinates: 36°23′49″N 52°22′53″E
- Country: Iran
- Province: Mazandaran
- County: Amol
- District: Central
- Rural District: Dasht-e Sar-e Sofla

Population (2016)
  - Total: 150
- Time zone: UTC+3:30 (IRST)

Ziarud (Persian: زيارود) (Note: Also romanized as Zīārūd; also known as Ziaru, Zīārū, and Zyaroo) is a village in Dasht-e Sar-e Sofla Rural District of the Central District in Amol County, Mazandaran province, Iran.

== Demographics ==
=== Population ===
At the time of the 2006 National Census, the village's population was 154 in 42 households, when it was in Bala Khiyaban-e Litkuh Rural District. The following census in 2011 counted 128 people in 34 households, by which time the village had been separated from the rural district in the formation of Dasht-e Sar-e Sofla Rural District in the same district. The 2016 census measured the population of the village as 150 people in 50 households.
