= Kateh Posht-e Olya =

Village in Mazandaran province, Iran

Kateh Posht-e Olya Persian: كته پشت عليا
- Village
- Location within Iran
- Coordinates: 36°26′14″N 52°23′22″E
- Country: Iran
- Province: Mazandaran
- County: Amol
- District: Central
- Rural District: Dasht-e Sar-e Sofla

Population (2016)
  - Total: 931
- Time zone: UTC+3:30 (IRST)

Kateh Posht-e Olya (Persian: كته پشت عليا) (Note: Also romanized as Kateh Posht-e ‘Olyā; also known as Kateh Posht) is a village in Dasht-e Sar-e Sofla Rural District of the Central District in Amol County, Mazandaran province, Iran.

== Demographics ==
=== Population ===
At the time of the 2006 National Census, the village's population was 585 in 146 households, when it was in Bala Khiyaban-e Litkuh Rural District. The following census in 2011 counted 891 people in 307 households, by which time the village had been separated from the rural district in the formation of Dasht-e Sar-e Sofla Rural District in the same district. The 2016 census measured the population of the village as 931 people in 330 households.
