= Ahankoti =

Ahankoti آهن كتی
- Village
- Location within Iran
- Coordinates: 36°31′00″N 52°19′00″E
- Country: Iran
- Province: Mazandaran
- County: Amol
- Bakhsh: Central
- Rural District: Pain Khiyaban-e Litkuh

Population (2016)
  - Total: 267
- Time zone: UTC+3:30 (IRST)

Ahankoti (Persian: آهن کتی, also Romanized as Āhankotī) is a village in Pain Khiyaban-e Litkuh Rural District, in the Central District of Amol County, Mazandaran Province, Iran.

At the time of the 2006 National Census, the village's population was 142 in 37 households. The following census in 2011 counted 186 people in 54 households. The 2016 census measured the population of the village as 267 people in 89 households.
