= Suteh Kola =

Village in Mazandaran province, Iran

Suteh Kola Persian: سوته كلا
- Village
- Location within Iran
- Coordinates: 36°26′28″N 52°19′13″E
- Country: Iran
- Province: Mazandaran
- County: Amol
- District: Central
- Rural District: Pain Khiyaban-e Litkuh

Population (2016)
  - Total: 827
- Time zone: UTC+3:30 (IRST)

Suteh Kola (Persian: سوته كلا) (Note: Also romanized as Sūteh Kolā) is a village in Pain Khiyaban-e Litkuh Rural District of the Central District in Amol County, Mazandaran province, Iran.

== Demographics ==
=== Population ===
At the time of the 2006 National Census, the village's population was 749 in 213 households, when it was in Bala Khiyaban-e Litkuh Rural District. The following census in 2011 counted 827 people in 250 households, by which time the village had been transferred to Pain Khiyaban-e Litkuh Rural District. The 2016 census measured the population of the village as 827 people in 287 households.
