= Rudbar Dasht =

Village in Mazandaran province, Iran

Rudbar Dasht Persian: رودباردشت
- Village
- Location within Iran
- Coordinates: 36°25′12″N 52°21′41″E
- Country: Iran
- Province: Mazandaran
- County: Amol
- District: Central
- Rural District: Dasht-e Sar-e Sofla

Population (2016)
  - Total: 586
- Time zone: UTC+3:30 (IRST)

Rudbar Dasht (Persian: رودباردشت) (Note: Also romanized as Rūdbār Dasht) is a village in Dasht-e Sar-e Sofla Rural District of the Central District in Amol County, Mazandaran province, Iran.

== Demographics ==
=== Population ===
At the time of the 2006 National Census, the village's population was 650 in 157 households, when it was in Bala Khiyaban-e Litkuh Rural District. The following census in 2011 counted 598 people in 186 households, by which time the village had been separated from the rural district in the formation of Dasht-e Sar-e Sofla Rural District in the same district. The 2016 census measured the population of the village as 586 people in 198 households.
