= Kohneh Dan =

Village in Mazandaran province, Iran

Kohneh Dan Persian: كهنه دان
- Village
- Location within Iran
- Coordinates: 36°31′31″N 52°24′48″E
- Country: Iran
- Province: Mazandaran
- County: Amol
- District: Central
- Rural District: Harazpey-ye Jonubi

Population (2016)
  - Total: 602
- Time zone: UTC+3:30 (IRST)

Kohneh Dan (Persian: كهنه دان) (Note: Also romanized as Kohneh Dān; also known as Kohneh Dūn) is a village in Harazpey-ye Jonubi Rural District of the Central District in Amol County, Mazandaran province, Iran.

== Demographics ==
=== Population ===
At the time of the 2006 National Census, the village's population was 560 in 150 households. The following census in 2011 counted 446 people in 130 households. The 2016 census measured the population of the village as 602 people in 201 households.
