= Tazehabad, Amol =

Tazehabad تازه آباد
- Village
- Location within Iran
- Coordinates: 36°30′55″N 52°15′25″E
- Country: Iran
- Province: Mazandaran
- County: Amol
- Bakhsh: Central
- Rural District: Pain Khiyaban-e Litkuh

Population (2016)
  - Total: 366
- Time zone: UTC+3:30 (IRST)

Tazehabad (Persian: تازه آباد, also Romanized as Tāzehābād) is a village in Pain Khiyaban-e Litkuh Rural District, in the Central District of Amol County, Mazandaran Province, Iran.

At the time of the 2006 National Census, the village's population was 361 in 88 households. The following census in 2011 counted 356 people in 101 households. The 2016 census measured the population of the village as 366 people in 129 households.
