= Derazan =

Village in Mazandaran province, Iran

Derazan Persian: درازان
- Village
- Location within Iran
- Coordinates: 36°25′45″N 52°20′45″E
- Country: Iran
- Province: Mazandaran
- County: Amol
- District: Central
- Rural District: Dasht-e Sar-e Sofla

Population (2016)
  - Total: 1,472
- Time zone: UTC+3:30 (IRST)

Derazan (Persian: درازان) (Note: Also romanized as Derāzān) is a village in Dasht-e Sar-e Sofla Rural District of the Central District in Amol County, Mazandaran province, Iran.

== Demographics ==
=== Population ===
At the time of the 2006 National Census, the village's population was 1,211 in 338 households, when it was in Bala Khiyaban-e Litkuh Rural District. The following census in 2011 counted 1,423 people in 434 households, by which time the village had been separated from the rural district in the formation of Dasht-e Sar-e Sofla Rural District in the same district. The 2016 census measured the population of the village as 1,472 people in 501 households. It was the most populous village in its rural district.
