= Changaz =

Village in Mazandaran province, Iran

Changaz Persian: چنگاز
- Village
- Location within Iran
- Coordinates: 36°28′42″N 52°16′03″E
- Country: Iran
- Province: Mazandaran
- County: Amol
- District: Central
- Rural District: Pain Khiyaban-e Litkuh

Population (2016)
  - Total: 663
- Time zone: UTC+3:30 (IRST)

Changaz (Persian: چنگاز) (Note: Also romanized as Changāz) is a village in Pain Khiyaban-e Litkuh Rural District of the Central District in Amol County, Mazandaran province, Iran.

== Demographics ==
=== Population ===
At the time of the 2006 National Census, the village's population was 549 in 142 households. The following census in 2011 counted 535 people in 164 households. The 2016 census measured the population of the village as 663 people in 224 households.
