= Kelikan =

Village in Mazandaran province, Iran

Kelikan Persian: كليكان
- Village
- Location within Iran
- Coordinates: 36°30′36″N 52°21′54″E
- Country: Iran
- Province: Mazandaran
- County: Amol
- District: Central
- Rural District: Harazpey-ye Jonubi

Population (2016)
  - Total: 515
- Time zone: UTC+3:30 (IRST)

Kelikan (Persian: كليكان) (Note: Also romanized as Kelīkān; also known as Kolahkān) is a village in Harazpey-ye Jonubi Rural District of the Central District in Amol County, Mazandaran province, Iran.

== Demographics ==
=== Population ===
At the time of the 2006 National Census, the village's population was 394 in 101 households. The following census in 2011 counted 431 people in 130 households. The 2016 census measured the population of the village as 515 people in 165 households.
