= Qadi Mahalleh, Amol =

Village in Mazandaran province, Iran

Qadi Mahalleh Persian: قادي محله
- Village
- Location within Iran
- Coordinates: 36°30′56″N 52°20′33″E
- Country: Iran
- Province: Mazandaran
- County: Amol
- District: Central
- Rural District: Harazpey-ye Jonubi

Population (2016)
  - Total: 740
- Time zone: UTC+3:30 (IRST)

Qadi Mahalleh (Persian: قادي محله) (Note: Also romanized as Qādī Maḩalleh) is a village in, and the capital of, Harazpey-ye Jonubi Rural District in the Central District of Amol County, Mazandaran province, Iran.

== Demographics ==
=== Population ===
At the time of the 2006 National Census, the village's population was 698 in 193 households. The following census in 2011 counted 741 people in 228 households. The 2016 census measured the population of the village as 740 people in 245 households.
