= Shirkaj =

Shirkaj شيركاج
- Village
- Location within Iran
- Coordinates: 36°27′54″N 52°18′07″E
- Country: Iran
- Province: Mazandaran
- County: Amol
- Bakhsh: Central
- Rural District: Pain Khiyaban-e Litkuh

Population (2016)
  - Total: 129
- Time zone: UTC+3:30 (IRST)

Shirkaj (Persian: شيركاج, also Romanized as Shīrkāj) is a village in Pain Khiyaban-e Litkuh Rural District, in the Central District of Amol County, Mazandaran Province, Iran.

At the time of the 2006 National Census, the village's population was 110in 24 households. The following census in 2011 counted 90 people in 24 households. The 2016 census measured the population of the village as 129 people in 38 households.
