= MarKeti =

Marketi مارکتی
- Village
- Location within Iran
- Coordinates: 36°29′23″N 52°18′13″E
- Country: Iran
- Province: Mazandaran
- County: Amol
- Bakhsh: Central
- Rural District: Pain Khiyaban-e Litkuh

Population (2016)
  - Total: 283
- Time zone: UTC+3:30 (IRST)

MarKeti (Persian: مارکتی, also Romanized as MārKeti) is a village in Pain Khiyaban-e Litkuh Rural District, in the Central District of Amol County, Mazandaran Province, Iran.

At the time of the 2006 National Census, the village's population was 243 in 59 households. The following census in 2011 counted 208 people in 60 households. The 2016 census measured the population of the village as 283 people in 90 households.
