= Kom Kola =

Village in Mazandaran province, Iran

Kom Kola Persian: كمكلا
- Village
- Location within Iran
- Coordinates: 36°24′44″N 52°22′06″E
- Country: Iran
- Province: Mazandaran
- County: Amol
- District: Central
- Rural District: Dasht-e Sar-e Sofla

Population (2016)
  - Total: 384
- Time zone: UTC+3:30 (IRST)

Kom Kola (Persian: كمكلا) (Note: Also romanized as Kam Kala, Kom Kalā, and Kom Kolā; also known as Kūm Kalā and Qum Qal‘eh) is a village in Dasht-e Sar-e Sofla Rural District of the Central District in Amol County, Mazandaran province, Iran.

== Demographics ==
=== Population ===
At the time of the 2006 National Census, the village's population was 398 in 99 households, when it was in Bala Khiyaban-e Litkuh Rural District. The following census in 2011 counted 376 people in 108 households, by which time the village had been separated from the rural district in the formation of Dasht-e Sar-e Sofla Rural District in the same district. The 2016 census measured the population of the village as 384 people in 133 households.
