= Dormah Kola =

Village in Mazandaran province, Iran

Dormah Kola Persian: درمه كلا
- Village
- Location within Iran
- Coordinates: 36°26′39″N 52°19′54″E
- Country: Iran
- Province: Mazandaran
- County: Amol
- District: Central
- Rural District: Dasht-e Sar-e Sofla

Population (2016)
  - Total: 275
- Time zone: UTC+3:30 (IRST)

Dormah Kola (Persian: درمه كلا) (Note: Also romanized as Dormah Kolā; also known as Dormah Kolā-ye Bālā) is a village in Dasht-e Sar-e Sofla Rural District of the Central District in Amol County, Mazandaran province, Iran.

== Demographics ==
=== Population ===
At the time of the 2006 National Census, the village's population was 275 in 76 households, when it was in Bala Khiyaban-e Litkuh Rural District. The following census in 2011 counted 241 people in 70 households, by which time the village had been separated from the rural district in the formation of Dasht-e Sar-e Sofla Rural District in the same district. The 2016 census measured the population of the village as 275 people in 89 households.
