= Pain Khiyaban-e Litkuh Rural District =

Rural district in Mazandaran province, Iran

Pain Khiyaban-e Litkuh Rural District Persian: دهستان پائين خيابان ليتكوه
- Rural District
- Location within Iran
- Coordinates: 36°29′N 52°16′E
- Country: Iran
- Province: Mazandaran
- County: Amol
- District: Central
- Established: 1987
- Capital: Marandeh

Population (2016)
  - Total: 29,389
- Time zone: UTC+3:30 (IRST)

Pain Khiyaban-e Litkuh Rural District (Persian: دهستان پائين خيابان ليتكوه) is in the Central District of Amol County, Mazandaran province, Iran. Its capital is the village of Marandeh.

== Demographics ==
=== Population ===
At the time of the 2006 National Census, the rural district's population was 20,679 in 5,313 households. There were 24,605 inhabitants in 7,371 households at the following census of 2011. The 2016 census measured the population of the rural district as 29,389 in 9,656 households. The most populous of its 40 villages was Kolaksar, with 8,843 people.

=== Other villages in the rural district ===
- Aghuz Koti
- Aghuzbon
- Ahankoti
- Anj Pol
- Ansari Mahalleh
- Changaz
- Chau Sar Mahalleh
- Dar Kola
- Darkapey
- Galan
- Halikoti
- Hoseynabad
- Karchi Kola
- Kaseb Mahalleh
- Kordkoti
- Kuk Deh
- Kuseh Raz
- Markoti
- Maskun
- Mian Rud
- Naram
- Nowabad
- Pishgun
- Qajar Mahalleh
- Rukesh
- Sarhang Koti
- Sayij Mahalleh
- Shad Mahalleh
- Shirkaj
- Siah Lash
- Suteh Kola
- Tajanak
- Tajanjar-e Olya
- Tajanjar-e Sofla
- Tazehabad
- Valisdeh
- Varka Deh
- Zarundeh
