= Hali Koti, Amol =

Village in Mazandaran province, Iran

Hali Koti Persian: هلي كتي
- Village
- Location within Iran
- Coordinates: 36°30′21″N 52°19′17″E
- Country: Iran
- Province: Mazandaran
- County: Amol
- District: Central
- Rural District: Pain Khiyaban-e Litkuh

Population (2016)
  - Total: 790
- Time zone: UTC+3:30 (IRST)

Hali Koti (Persian: هلي كتي) (Note: Also romanized as Halī Kotī, Haliketi, Halīketī, Halikoti, and Halīkotī) is a village in Pain Khiyaban-e Litkuh Rural District of the Central District in Amol County, Mazandaran province, Iran.

== Demographics ==
=== Population ===
At the time of the 2006 National Census, the village's population was 676 in 168 households. The following census in 2011 counted 770 people in 219 households. The 2016 census measured the population of the village as 790 people in 276 households.
