= Tajanjar-e Olya =

Village in Mazandaran province, Iran

Tajanjar-e Olya Persian: تجن جارعليا
- Village
- Location within Iran
- Coordinates: 36°27′54″N 52°18′55″E
- Country: Iran
- Province: Mazandaran
- County: Amol
- District: Central
- Rural District: Pain Khiyaban-e Litkuh

Population (2016)
  - Total: 1,784
- Time zone: UTC+3:30 (IRST)

Tajanjar-e Olya (Persian: تجن جارعليا) (Note: Also romanized as Tajanjār-e ‘Olyā; also known as Tajanjār-e Bālā) is a village in Pain Khiyaban-e Litkuh Rural District of the Central District in Amol County, Mazandaran province, Iran.

== Demographics ==
=== Population ===
At the time of the 2006 National Census, the village's population was 1,165 in 314 households. The following census in 2011 counted 1,395 people in 423 households. The 2016 census measured the population of the village as 1,784 people in 553 households.
