= Maskun, Iran =

Maskun مسكون
- Village
- Location within Iran
- Coordinates: 36°30′04″N 52°16′18″E
- Country: Iran
- Province: Mazandaran
- County: Amol
- Bakhsh: Central
- Rural District: Pain Khiyaban-e Litkuh

Population (2016)
  - Total: 491
- Time zone: UTC+3:30 (IRST)

Maskun (Persian: مسكون, also Romanized as Maskūn; also known as Masgūn) is a village in Pain Khiyaban-e Litkuh Rural District, in the Central District of Amol County, Mazandaran Province, Iran.

At the time of the 2006 National Census, the village's population was 449 in 106 households. The following census in 2011 counted 438 people in 128 households. The 2016 census measured the population of the village as 491 people in 173 households.
