= Tajanjar-e Sofla =

Village in Mazandaran province, Iran

Tajanjar-e Sofla Persian: تجن جارسفلي
- Village
- Location within Iran
- Coordinates: 36°28′16″N 52°18′58″E
- Country: Iran
- Province: Mazandaran
- County: Amol
- District: Central
- Rural District: Pain Khiyaban-e Litkuh

Population (2016)
  - Total: 754
- Time zone: UTC+3:30 (IRST)

Tajanjar-e Sofla (Persian: تجن جارسفلي) (Note: Also romanized as Tajanjār-e Soflá; also known as Tajanjār-e Pā’īn) is a village in Pain Khiyaban-e Litkuh Rural District of the Central District in Amol County, Mazandaran province, Iran.

== Demographics ==
=== Population ===
At the time of the 2006 National Census, the village's population was 639 in 162 households. The following census in 2011 counted 695 people in 211 households. The 2016 census measured the population of the village as 754 people in 249 households.
