= Shad Mahalleh =

Village in Mazandaran province, Iran

Shad Mahalleh Persian: شادمحله
- Village
- Location within Iran
- Coordinates: 36°30′03″N 52°19′59″E
- Country: Iran
- Province: Mazandaran
- County: Amol
- District: Central
- Rural District: Pain Khiyaban-e Litkuh

Population (2016)
  - Total: 1,703
- Time zone: UTC+3:30 (IRST)

Shad Mahalleh (Persian: شادمحله) (Note: Also romanized as Shād Maḩalleh; also known as Shāh Maḩalleh) is a village in Pain Khiyaban-e Litkuh Rural District of the Central District in Amol County, Mazandaran province, Iran.

== Demographics ==
=== Population ===
At the time of the 2006 National Census, the village's population was 572 in 145 households. The following census in 2011 counted 985 people in 283 households. The 2016 census measured the population of the village as 1,703 people in 537 households.
