= Naram, Mazandaran =

Coordinates: 34°00′58″N 58°26′11″E

Naram نرم
- Village
- Interactive map of Naram
- Country: Iran
- Province: Mazandaran
- County: Amol
- Bakhsh: Central
- Rural District: Pain Khiyaban-e Litkuh

Population (2016)
  - Total: 19
- Time zone: UTC+3:30 (IRST)

Naram (Persian: نرم) is a village in Pain Khiyaban-e Litkuh Rural District, in the Central District of Amol County, Mazandaran Province, Iran.

At the time of the 2006 National Census, the village's population was 19 in 4 households. The following census in 2011 counted 18 people in 7 households. The 2016 census measured the population of the village as 19 people in 8 households.
