= Dasht-e Sar-e Sofla Rural District =

Rural district in Mazandaran province, Iran

Dasht-e Sar-e Sofla Rural District Persian: دهستان دشت ‌سر سفلی
- Rural District
- Location within Iran
- Coordinates: 36°24′N 52°23′E
- Country: Iran
- Province: Mazandaran
- County: Amol
- District: Central
- Established: 2010
- Capital: Tork Kola

Population (2016)
  - Total: 11,423
- Time zone: UTC+3:30 (IRST)

Dasht-e Sar-e Sofla Rural District (Persian: دهستان دشت ‌سر سفلی) is in the Central District of Amol County, Mazandaran province, Iran. Its capital is the village of Tork Kola.

== History ==
Dasht-e Sar-e Sofla Rural District was created in the Central District in 2010.

== Demographics ==
=== Population ===
At the time of the 2011 National Census, the rural district's population was 10,689 inhabitants in 3,260 households. The 2016 census measured the population of the rural district as 11,423 in 3,786 households. The most populous of its 16 villages was Derazan, with 1,472 people.

=== Other villages in the rural district ===
- Ab Bakhshan
- Bezminan
- Dormah Kola
- Kateh Posht-e Olya
- Khas Kola
- Kom Kola
- Konesi
- Mian Mahalleh
- Palak-e Olya
- Palak-e Sofla
- Paski Mahalleh
- Rudbar Dasht
- Tir Kan
- Ziarud
