= Palak-e Olya =

Village in Mazandaran province, Iran

Palak-e Olya Persian: پلك عليا
- Village
- Location within Iran
- Coordinates: 36°26′53″N 52°22′40″E
- Country: Iran
- Province: Mazandaran
- County: Amol
- District: Central
- Rural District: Dasht-e Sar-e Sofla

Population (2016)
  - Total: 632
- Time zone: UTC+3:30 (IRST)

Palak-e Olya (Persian: پلك عليا) (Note: Also romanized as Palak-e ‘Olyā) is a village in Dasht-e Sar-e Sofla Rural District of the Central District in Amol County, Mazandaran province, Iran.

== Demographics ==
=== Population ===
At the time of the 2006 National Census, the village's population was 361 in 89 households, when it was in Bala Khiyaban-e Litkuh Rural District. The following census in 2011 counted 405 people in 126 households, by which time the village had been separated from the rural district in the formation of Dasht-e Sar-e Sofla Rural District in the same district. The 2016 census measured the population of the village as 632 people in 205 households.
