= Aghuz Koti, Amol =

Aghuz Koti آغوزكتی
- Village
- Location within Iran
- Coordinates: 36°29′44″N 52°18′16″E
- Country: Iran
- Province: Mazandaran
- County: Amol
- Bakhsh: Central
- Rural District: Pain Khiyaban-e Litkuh

Population (2016)
  - Total: 322
- Time zone: UTC+3:30 (IRST)

Aghuz Koti (Persian: آغوزكتی, also Romanized as Aghuz Keti, Āghūz Ketī and Āghūz Kotī) is a village in Pain Khiyaban-e Litkuh Rural District, in the Central District of Amol County, Mazandaran Province, Iran.

At the time of the 2006 National Census, the village's population was 319 in 77 households. The following census in 2011 counted 314 people in 88 households. The 2016 census measured the population of the village as 322 people in 103 households.
