= Tir Kan, Mazandaran =

Village in Mazandaran province, Iran

Tir Kan Persian: تيركان
- Village
- Location within Iran
- Coordinates: 36°26′30″N 52°23′52″E
- Country: Iran
- Province: Mazandaran
- County: Amol
- District: Central
- Rural District: Dasht-e Sar-e Sofla

Population (2016)
  - Total: 574
- Time zone: UTC+3:30 (IRST)

Tir Kan (Persian: تيركان) (Note: Also romanized as Tīr Kān) is a village in Dasht-e Sar-e Sofla Rural District of the Central District in Amol County, Mazandaran province, Iran.

== Demographics ==
=== Population ===
At the time of the 2006 National Census, the village's population was 480 in 119 households, when it was in Bala Khiyaban-e Litkuh Rural District. The following census in 2011 counted 409 people in 121 households, by which time the village had been separated from the rural district in the formation of Dasht-e Sar-e Sofla Rural District in the same district. The 2016 census measured the population of the village as 574 people in 182 households.
