= Mian Rud-e Zaruni =

Mian Rud-e Zaruni ميانرودضروني
- Village
- Location within Iran
- Coordinates: 33°25′50″N 47°37′54″E
- Country: Iran
- Province: Lorestan
- County: Kuhdasht
- Bakhsh: Central
- Rural District: Kuhdasht-e Jonubi

Population (2006)
  - Total: 189
- Time zone: UTC+3:30 (IRST)
  - Summer (DST): UTC+4:30 (IRDT)

Mian Rud-e Zaruni (Persian: ميانرودضروني, also Romanized as Mīān Rūd-e Ẕarūnī; also known as Pol-e Mādīānrūd, Mīānrūd, and Mīān Rūd) is a village in Kuhdasht-e Jonubi Rural District, in the Central District of Kuhdasht County, Lorestan Province, Iran. At the 2006 census, its population was 189, in 40 families.
