= Hali Koti, Bandpey-ye Sharqi =

Hali Koti هلی کتی
- Village
- Interactive map of Hali Koti
- Coordinates: 36.27°N 52.655°E
- Country: Iran
- Province: Mazandaran
- County: Babol
- Bakhsh: Bandpey-ye Sharqi
- Rural District: Sajjadrud

Population (2016)
  - Total: 0
- Time zone: UTC+3:30 (IRST)

Hali Koti (Persian: هلی کتی, also Romanized as Halī Kotī) is a village in Sajjadrud Rural District, Bandpey-ye Sharqi District, Babol County, Mazandaran Province, Iran.

At the time of the 2006 National Census, the village's population was 17 in 4 households. The following census in 2011 counted less than 4 households. The 2016 census recorded no households in the village.
