= Mianrud, Marvdasht =

Mianrud ميانرود
- Village
- Location within Iran
- Coordinates: 30°10′26″N 52°40′05″E
- Country: Iran
- Province: Fars
- County: Marvdasht
- Bakhsh: Dorudzan
- Rural District: Abarj

Population (2006)
  - Total: 536
- Time zone: UTC+3:30 (IRST)
  - Summer (DST): UTC+4:30 (IRDT)

Mianrud (Persian: ميانرود, also Romanized as Mīānrūd) is a village in Abarj Rural District, Dorudzan District, Marvdasht County, Fars province, Iran. At the 2006 census, its population was 536, in 122 families.
