= Aleksander Pawlak =

Polish footballer (born 2001)

Personal information
- Date of birth: 14 November 2001 (age 24)
- Place of birth: Płock, Poland
- Height: 1.78 m (5 ft 10 in)
- Positions: Right-back; right midfielder

Youth career
- –2018: Wisła Płock

Senior career*
Years	Team	Apps	(Gls)
2018–2026	Wisła Płock II	65	(10)
2020–2025	Wisła Płock	36	(2)
2021	→ Stomil Olsztyn (loan)	4	(0)
2024–2025	→ ŁKS Łódź (loan)	1	(0)
2024–2025	→ ŁKS Łódź II (loan)	5	(0)
- * Club domestic league appearances and goals as of 20:39, 7 June 2025 (UTC)

Aleksander Pawlak (born 14 November 2001) is a Polish professional footballer who plays as either a right-back or a right midfielder.

== Career statistics ==
As of match played 28 October 2024

Appearances and goals by club, season and competition
Club	Season	League			Polish Cup		Europe		Other		Total	
Club	Season	Division	Apps	Goals	Apps	Goals	Apps	Goals	Apps	Goals	Apps	Goals
Wisła Płock II	2018–19	IV liga Masovia North	16	1	—		—		—		16	1
Wisła Płock II	2019–20	IV liga Masovia North	12	0	—		—		—		12	0
Wisła Płock II	2020–21	IV liga Masovia	14	2	—		—		—		14	2
Wisła Płock II	2021–22	IV liga Masovia I	3	0	—		—		—		3	0
Wisła Płock II	2022–23	IV liga Masovia	1	0	—		—		—		1	0
Wisła Płock II	2023–24	IV liga Masovia	19	7	—		—		—		19	7
Wisła Płock II	2025–26	III liga, group I	0	0	—		—		—		0	0
Wisła Płock II	Total		65	10	—		—		—		65	10
Wisła Płock	2019–20	Ekstraklasa	4	0	0	0	—		—		4	0
Wisła Płock	2020–21	Ekstraklasa	2	0	2	0	—		—		4	0
Wisła Płock	2021–22	Ekstraklasa	7	1	—		—		—		7	1
Wisła Płock	2022–23	Ekstraklasa	23	1	2	0	—		—		25	1
Wisła Płock	2023–24	I liga	0	0	0	0	—		—		0	0
Wisła Płock	Total		36	2	4	0	—		—		40	2
Stomil Olsztyn (loan)	2021–22	I liga	4	0	0	0	—		—		4	0
ŁKS Łódź (loan)	2024–25	I liga	1	0	1	0	—		—		2	0
ŁKS Łódź II (loan)	2024–25	II liga	5	0	0	0	—		—		5	0
Career total			111	12	5	0	—		—		116	11

== Honours ==
Wisła Płock II

- IV liga Masovia: 2023–24
- Polish Cup (Masovia regionals): 2018–19, 2019–20
