= Bish Mahalleh, Dabudasht =

Bish Mahalleh بيش محله
- Village
- Location within Iran
- Coordinates: 36°34′16″N 52°27′15″E
- Country: Iran
- Province: Mazandaran
- County: Amol
- Bakhsh: Dabudasht
- Rural District: Dabuy-ye Jonubi

Population (2006)
  - Total: 253
- Time zone: UTC+3:30 (IRST)
  - Summer (DST): UTC+4:30 (IRDT)

Bish Mahalleh (Persian: بيش محله, also Romanized as Bīsh Maḩalleh; also known as Bīsheh Maḩalleh) is a village in Dabuy-ye Jonubi Rural District, Dabudasht District, Amol County, Mazandaran Province, Iran. At the 2006 census, its population was 253, in 70 families.
