= Palak (name) =

Palak is an Indian feminine given name. Notable people with the name include:

- Palak Jain, several Indian actresses
- Palak Kohli (born 2002), Indian para-badminton player
- Palak Kour Bijral (born 1996), Indian rhythmic gymnast
- Palak Lalwani (born 1996), Indian actress
- Palak Muchhal (born 1992), Indian singer
