= Mianrud, Firuzabad =

Mianrud ميانرود
- Village
- Location within Iran
- Coordinates: 33°53′19″N 47°03′26″E
- Country: Iran
- Province: Kermanshah
- County: Kermanshah
- Bakhsh: Firuzabad
- Rural District: Jalalvand

Population (2006)
  - Total: 33
- Time zone: UTC+3:30 (IRST)
  - Summer (DST): UTC+4:30 (IRDT)

Mianrud (Persian: ميانرود, also Romanized as Mīānrūd) is a village in Jalalvand Rural District, Firuzabad District, Kermanshah County, Kermanshah Province, Iran. At the 2006 census, its population was 33, in 8 families.
