= Mian Rud, Gilan-e Gharb =

Mian Rud ميان رود
- Village
- Location within Iran
- Coordinates: 34°18′56″N 45°53′30″E
- Country: Iran
- Province: Kermanshah
- County: Gilan-e Gharb
- Bakhsh: Central
- Rural District: Direh

Population (2006)
  - Total: 145
- Time zone: UTC+3:30 (IRST)
  - Summer (DST): UTC+4:30 (IRDT)

Mian Rud (Persian: ميان رود, also Romanized as Mīān Rūd; also known as Mīān Rūd-e ‘Olyā and Varmazyār) is a village in Direh Rural District, in the Central District of Gilan-e Gharb County, Kermanshah Province, Iran. At the 2006 census, its population was 145, in 25 families.
