= Mian Rud, Eqlid =

Mian Rud ميانرود
- Village
- Location within Iran
- Coordinates: 30°25′29″N 52°35′20″E
- Country: Iran
- Province: Fars
- County: Eqlid
- Bakhsh: Hasanabad
- Rural District: Ahmadabad

Population (2006)
  - Total: 329
- Time zone: UTC+3:30 (IRST)
  - Summer (DST): UTC+4:30 (IRDT)

Mian Rud (Persian: ميانرود, also Romanized as Mīān Rūd and Meyān Rūd) is a village in Ahmadabad Rural District, Hasanabad District, Eqlid County, Fars province, Iran. At the 2006 census, its population was 329, in 84 families.
