= Mian Rud, Tonekabon =

Mian Rud ميان رود
- Village
- Location within Iran
- Coordinates: 36°48′24″N 50°46′55″E
- Country: Iran
- Province: Mazandaran
- County: Tonekabon
- Bakhsh: Central
- Rural District: Goli Jan

Population (2006)
  - Total: 199
- Time zone: UTC+3:30 (IRST)
  - Summer (DST): UTC+4:30 (IRDT)

Mian Rud (Persian: ميان رود, also Romanized as Mīān Rūd) is a village in Goli Jan Rural District, in the Central District of Tonekabon County, Mazandaran Province, Iran. At the 2006 census, its population was 199, in 60 families.
