= Mian Rud, Babol =

Mian Rud ميانرود
- Village
- Location within Iran
- Coordinates: 36°35′00″N 52°38′00″E
- Country: Iran
- Province: Mazandaran
- County: Babol
- Bakhsh: Central
- Rural District: Feyziyeh

Population (2016)
  - Total: 225
- Time zone: UTC+3:30 (IRST)

Mian Rud (Persian: ميانرود, also Romanized as Mīān Rūd) is a village in Feyziyeh Rural District, in the Central District of Babol County, Mazandaran Province, Iran.

At the time of the 2006 National Census, the village's population was 206 in 49 households. The following census in 2011 counted 214 people in 53 households. The 2016 census measured the population of the village as 225 people in 65 households.
