= Hali Koti, Babol Kenar =

Hali Koti هلی کتی
- Village
- Interactive map of Hali Koti
- Coordinates: 36.296°N 52.697°E
- Country: Iran
- Province: Mazandaran
- County: Babol
- Bakhsh: Babol Kenar
- Rural District: Deraz Kola

Population (2016)
  - Total: 109
- Time zone: UTC+3:30 (IRST)

Hali Koti (Persian: هلی کتی, also Romanized as Halī Kotī) is a village in Deraz Kola Rural District, Babol Kenar District, Babol County, Mazandaran Province, Iran.

At the time of the 2006 National Census, the village's population was 88 in 25 households. The following census in 2011 counted 93 people in 30 households. The 2016 census measured the population of the village as 109 people in 35 households.
