= Harazpey-ye Jonubi Rural District =

Rural district in Mazandaran province, Iran

Harazpey-ye Jonubi Rural District Persian: دهستان هراز پی جنوبی
- Rural District
- Location within Iran
- Coordinates: 36°32′N 52°22′E
- Country: Iran
- Province: Mazandaran
- County: Amol
- District: Central
- Established: 1987
- Capital: Qadi Mahalleh

Population (2016)
  - Total: 18,460
- Time zone: UTC+3:30 (IRST)

Harazpey-ye Jonubi Rural District (Persian: دهستان هراز پی جنوبی) is in the Central District of Amol County, Mazandaran province, Iran. Its capital is the village of Qadi Mahalleh.

== Demographics ==
=== Population ===
At the time of the 2006 National Census, the rural district's population was 16,404 in 4,249 households. There were 16,060 inhabitants in 4,840 households at the following census of 2011. The 2016 census measured the population of the rural district as 18,460 in 6,108 households. The most populous of its 40 villages was Kamangar Kola, with 1,615 people.

=== Other villages in the rural district ===
- Ali Kola-ye Ahi
- Aski Mahalleh
- Jafarabad
- Jamshidabad
- Kelikan
- Kohneh Dan
- Kola Safa
- Owjiabad
- Qoroq
- Pasha Kola
- Rafiabad
- Rudbar
- Sang-e Bast
- Sharm Kola
