= Central District (Amol County) =

District in Mazandaran province, Iran

Central District (Amol County) Persian: بخش مرکزی شهرستان آمل
- District
- Location within Iran
- Coordinates: 36°28′N 52°19′E
- Country: Iran
- Province: Mazandaran
- County: Amol
- Capital: Amol

Population (2016)
  - Total: 296,800
- Time zone: UTC+3:30 (IRST)

The Central District of Amol County (Persian: بخش مرکزی شهرستان آمل) is in Mazandaran province, Iran. Its capital is the city of Amol.

== History ==
In 2010, Dasht-e Sar-e Sofla Rural District was created in the district. Bala Khiyaban-e Litkuh and Chelav Rural Districts were separated from it in the formation of Emamzadeh Abdollah District.

== Demographics ==
=== Population ===
At the time of the 2006 census, the district's population was 260,971 in 71,432 households. The following census in 2011 counted 271,269 people in 82,653 households. The 2016 census measured the population of the district as 296,800 inhabitants in 98,147 households.

=== Administrative divisions ===
Central District (Amol County) Population
Administrative Divisions	2006	2011	2016
Bala Khiyaban-e Litkuh RD (Note: Portions transferred to Emamzadeh Abdollah District)	22,171		
Chelav RD (Note: Transferred to Emamzadeh Abdollah District)	4,247		
Dasht-e Sar-e Sofla RD		10,689	11,423
Harazpey-ye Jonubi RD	16,404	16,060	18,460
Pain Khiyaban-e Litkuh RD	20,679	24,605	29,389
Amol (city)	197,470	219,915	237,528
Total	260,971	271,269	296,800
RD = Rural District
