= Kasemdeh =

Neighborhood in Mazandaran province, Iran

Kasemdeh Persian: كاسمده
- Neighborhood
- Location within Iran
- Coordinates: 36°25′11″N 52°18′16″E
- Country: Iran
- Province: Mazandaran
- County: Amol
- District: Emamzadeh Abdollah
- City: Emamzadeh Abdollah

Population (2006)
  - Total: 646
- Time zone: UTC+3:30 (IRST)

Kasemdeh (Persian: كاسمده) (Note: Also romanized as Kāsemdeh) is a neighborhood in the city of Emamzadeh Abdollah in Emamzadeh Abdollah District of Amol County, Mazandaran province, Iran.

== Demographics ==
=== Population ===
At the time of the 2006 National Census, Kasemdeh's population was 646 in 158 households, when it was a village in Bala Khiyaban-e Litkuh Rural District of the Central District.

In 2010, the village of Esku Mahalleh was merged with the villages of Espand and Kasemdeh and renamed the village of Emamzadeh Abdollah, which was converted to a city in 2012.
