= Espand, Mazandaran =

Neighborhood in Mazandaran province, Iran

Espand Persian: اسپند
- Neighborhood
- Location within Iran
- Coordinates: 36°24′35″N 52°17′30″E
- Country: Iran
- Province: Mazandaran
- County: Amol
- District: Emamzadeh Abdollah
- City: Emamzadeh Abdollah

Population (2006)
  - Total: 276
- Time zone: UTC+3:30 (IRST)

Espand (Persian: اسپند) (Note: Also known as Espandeh) is a neighborhood in the city of Emamzadeh Abdollah in Emamzadeh Abdollah District of Amol County, Mazandaran province, Iran.

== Demographics ==
=== Population ===
At the time of the 2006 National Census, Espand's population was 276 in 69 households, when it was a village in Bala Khiyaban-e Litkuh Rural District of the Central District.

In 2010, the village of Esku Mahalleh was merged with the villages of Espand and Kasemdeh and renamed the village of Emamzadeh Abdollah, which was converted to a city in 2012.
