= Kherem, Mazandaran =

Kherem خرم
- Village
- Location within Iran
- Coordinates: 35°59′00″N 52°30′00″E
- Country: Iran
- Province: Mazandaran
- County: Amol
- Bakhsh: Emamzadeh Abdollah District
- Rural District: Chelav

Population (2016)
  - Total: 59
- Time zone: UTC+3:30 (IRST)

Kherem (Persian: خرم) is a village in Chelav Rural District, in Emamzadeh Abdollah District of Amol County, Mazandaran Province, Iran. At the 2016 census, its population was 59, in 24 families. Up from 49 people in 2006.
