= Ali Jangal =

Village in Mazandaran province, Iran

Ali Jangal Persian: عالی جنگل
- Village
- Location within Iran
- Coordinates: 36°25′56″N 52°17′55″E
- Country: Iran
- Province: Mazandaran
- County: Amol
- District: Emamzadeh Abdollah
- Rural District: Bala Khiyaban-e Litkuh

Population (2016)
  - Total: 81
- Time zone: UTC+3:30 (IRST)

Ali Jangal (Persian: عالی جنگل) (Note: Also romanized as ‘Ālī Jangal; also known as ‘Ālī Changal) is a village in Bala Khiyaban-e Litkuh Rural District of Emamzadeh Abdollah District in Amol County, Mazandaran province, Iran.

== Demographics ==
=== Population ===
At the time of the 2006 National Census, the village's population was 85 in 22 households, when it was in the Central District. The following census in 2011 counted 96 people in 29 households, by which time the rural district had been separated from the district in the formation of Emamzadeh Abdollah District. The 2016 census measured the population of the village as 81 people in 24 households.
