= Mikhran =

Village in Mazandaran province, Iran

Mikhran Persian: ميخران
- Village
- Location within Iran
- Coordinates: 36°25′55″N 52°18′54″E
- Country: Iran
- Province: Mazandaran
- County: Amol
- District: Emamzadeh Abdollah
- Rural District: Bala Khiyaban-e Litkuh

Population (2016)
  - Total: 732
- Time zone: UTC+3:30 (IRST)

Mikhran (Persian: ميخران) (Note: Also romanized as Mīkhrān) is a village in Bala Khiyaban-e Litkuh Rural District of Emamzadeh Abdollah District in Amol County, Mazandaran province, Iran.

== Demographics ==
=== Population ===
At the time of the 2006 National Census, the village's population was 697 in 163 households, when it was in the Central District. The following census in 2011 counted 632 people in 192 households, by which time the rural district had been separated from the district in the formation of Emamzadeh Abdollah District. The 2016 census measured the population of the village as 732 people in 208 households.
