= Marzan Kola =

Village in Mazandaran province, Iran

Marzan Kola Persian: مرزانكلا
- Village
- Location within Iran
- Coordinates: 36°24′58″N 52°20′16″E
- Country: Iran
- Province: Mazandaran
- County: Amol
- District: Emamzadeh Abdollah
- Rural District: Bala Khiyaban-e Litkuh

Population (2016)
  - Total: 1,456
- Time zone: UTC+3:30 (IRST)

Marzan Kola (Persian: مرزانكلا) (Note: Also romanized as Marzān Kolā; also known as Mozrownkolā and Mūrān Kolā) is a village in Bala Khiyaban-e Litkuh Rural District of Emamzadeh Abdollah District in Amol County, Mazandaran province, Iran.

== Demographics ==
=== Population ===
At the time of the 2006 National Census, the village's population was 1,218 in 299 households, when it was in the Central District. The following census in 2011 counted 1,457 people in 438 households, by which time the rural district had been separated from the district in the formation of Emamzadeh Abdollah District. The 2016 census measured the population of the village as 1,456 people in 476 households. It was the most populous village in its rural district.
