= Nowgardan =

Village in Mazandaran province, Iran

Nowgardan Persian: نوگردن
- Village
- Location within Iran
- Coordinates: 36°24′27″N 52°20′09″E
- Country: Iran
- Province: Mazandaran
- County: Amol
- District: Emamzadeh Abdollah
- Rural District: Bala Khiyaban-e Litkuh

Population (2016)
  - Total: 402
- Time zone: UTC+3:30 (IRST)

Nowgardan (Persian: نوگردن) is a village in Bala Khiyaban-e Litkuh Rural District of Emamzadeh Abdollah District in Amol County, Mazandaran province, Iran.

== Demographics ==
=== Population ===
At the time of the 2006 National Census, the village's population was 381 in 85 households, when it was in the Central District. The following census in 2011 counted 400 people in 114 households, by which time the rural district had been separated from the district in the formation of Emamzadeh Abdollah District. The 2016 census measured the population of the village as 402 people in 122 households.
