= Razakeh =

Village in Mazandaran province, Iran

Razakeh Persian: رزكه
- Village
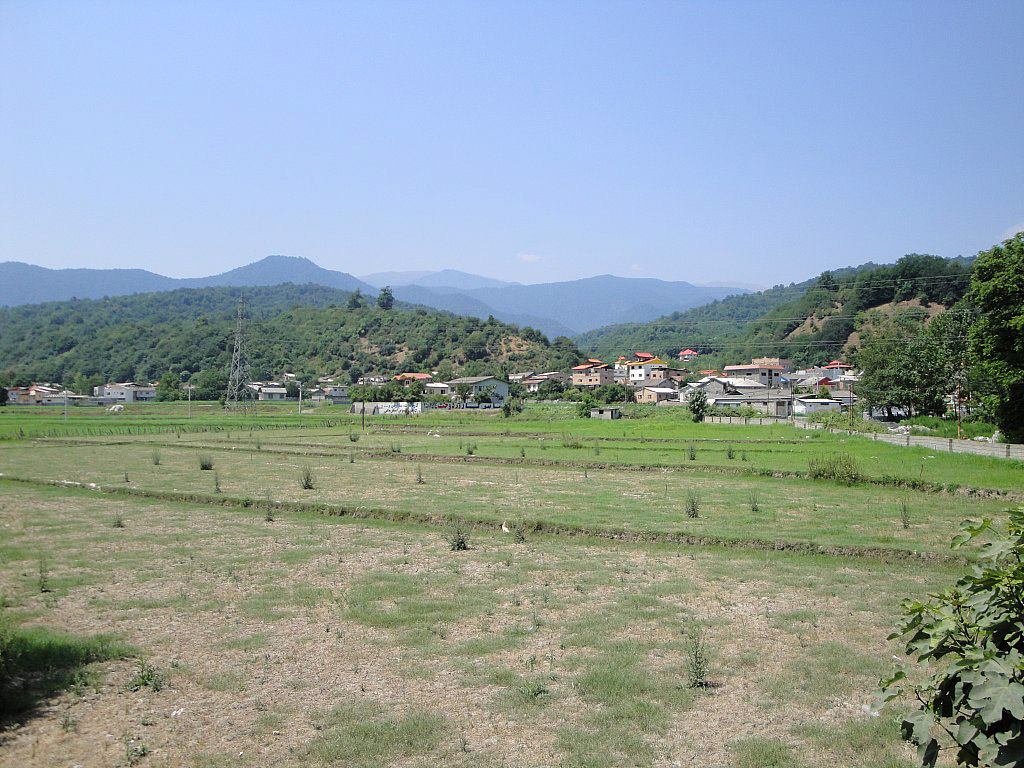
- The village of Razakeh

- Location within Iran
- Coordinates: 36°19′50″N 52°21′39″E
- Country: Iran
- Province: Mazandaran
- County: Amol
- District: Emamzadeh Abdollah
- Rural District: Chelav

Population (2016)
  - Total: 1,599
- Time zone: UTC+3:30 (IRST)

Razakeh (Persian: رزكه) (Note: Also known as Razageh) is a village in, and the capital of, Chelav Rural District in Emamzadeh Abdollah District of Amol County, Mazandaran province, Iran.

== Demographics ==
=== Population ===
At the time of the 2006 National Census, the village's population was 1,511 in 375 households, when it was in the Central District. The following census in 2011 counted 1,656 people in 495 households, by which time the rural district had been separated from the district in the formation of Emamzadeh Abdollah District. The 2016 census measured the population of the village as 1,599 people in 499 households. It was the most populous village in its rural district.
