= Marijan, Iran =

Marijan (Persian: مريجان) in Iran may refer to:

- Marijan, Amol
- Marijan, Larijan, Amol County
