= Sehri =

Village in Mazandaran province, Iran

Sehri Persian: سهری
- Village
- Location within Iran
- Coordinates: 36°24′16″N 52°17′10″E
- Country: Iran
- Province: Mazandaran
- County: Amol
- District: Emamzadeh Abdollah
- Rural District: Bala Khiyaban-e Litkuh

Population (2016)
  - Total: 85
- Time zone: UTC+3:30 (IRST)

Sehri (Persian: سهری) (Note: Also romanized as Sehrī and Seḩrī) is a village in Bala Khiyaban-e Litkuh Rural District of Emamzadeh Abdollah District in Amol County, Mazandaran province, Iran.

== Demographics ==
=== Population ===
At the time of the 2006 National Census, the village's population was 91 in 22 households, when it was in the Central District. The following census in 2011 counted 65 people in 21 households, by which time the rural district had been separated from the district in the formation of Emamzadeh Abdollah District. The 2016 census measured the population of the village as 85 people in 29 households.
