= Pasha Kola, Chelav =

Village in Mazandaran province, Iran

Pasha Kola Persian: پاشاكلا
- Village
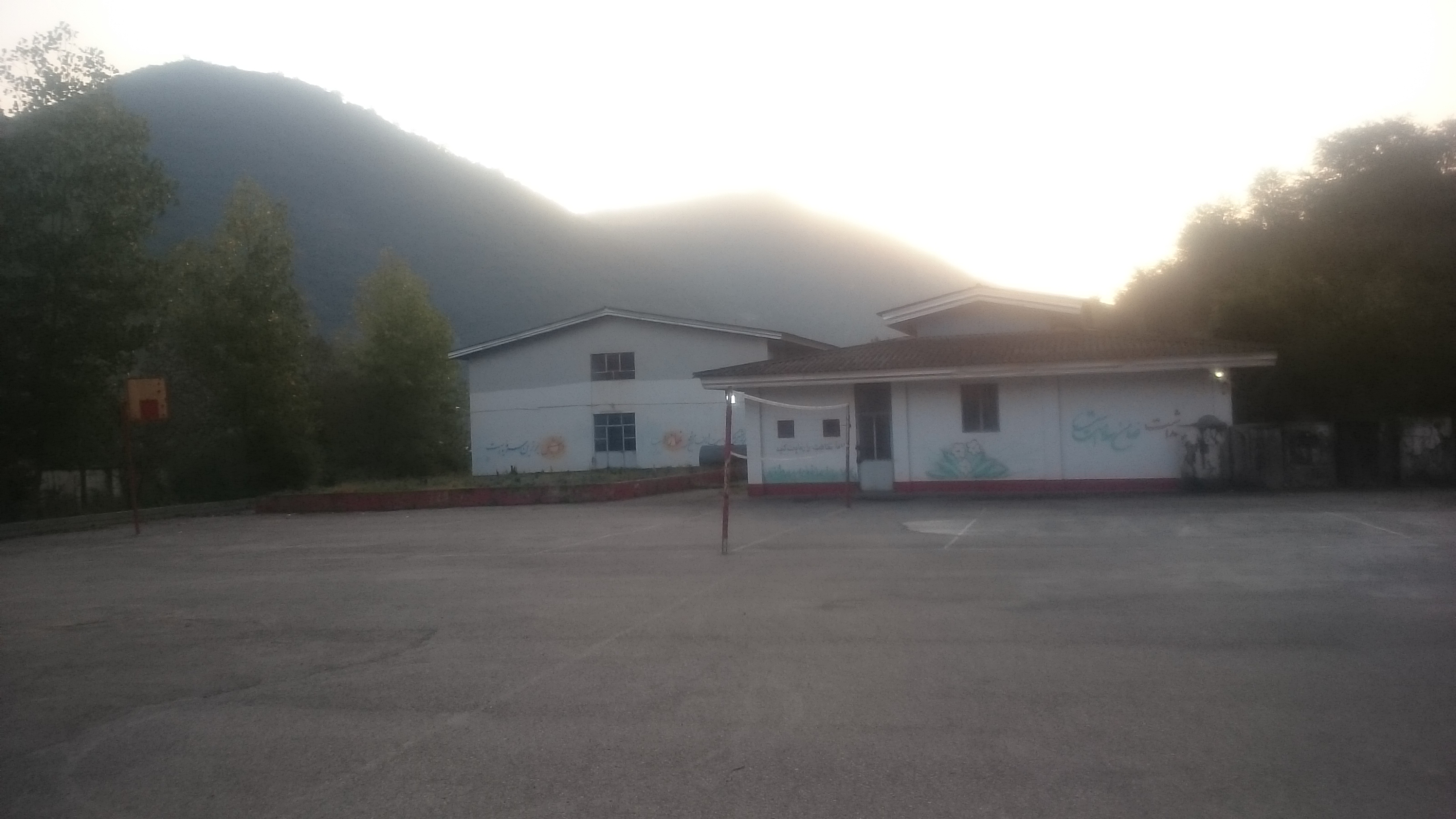
- School in the village of Pasha Kola

- Location within Iran
- Coordinates: 36°11′55″N 52°25′07″E
- Country: Iran
- Province: Mazandaran
- County: Amol
- District: Emamzadeh Abdollah
- Rural District: Chelav

Population (2016)
  - Total: 212
- Time zone: UTC+3:30 (IRST)

Pasha Kola (Persian: پاشاكلا) (Note: Also romanized as Pāshā Kolā) is a village in Chelav Rural District of Emamzadeh Abdollah District in Amol County, Mazandaran province, Iran.

== Demographics ==
=== Population ===
At the time of the 2006 National Census, the village's population was 104 in 30 households, when it was in the Central District. The following census in 2011 counted 165 people in 36 households, by which time the rural district had been separated from the district in the formation of Emamzadeh Abdollah District. The 2016 census measured the population of the village as 212 people in 74 households.
