= Parimeh =

Village in Mazandaran province, Iran

Parimeh Persian: پاريمه
- Village
- Location within Iran
- Coordinates: 36°12′34″N 52°24′25″E
- Country: Iran
- Province: Mazandaran
- County: Amol
- District: Emamzadeh Abdollah
- Rural District: Chelav

Population (2016)
  - Total: 107
- Time zone: UTC+3:30 (IRST)

Parimeh (Persian: پاريمه) (Note: Also romanized as Pārīmeh) is a village in Chelav Rural District of Emamzadeh Abdollah District in Amol County, Mazandaran province, Iran.

== Demographics ==
=== Population ===
At the time of the 2006 National Census, the village's population was 142 in 36 households, when it was in the Central District. The following census in 2011 counted 108 people in 28 households, by which time the rural district had been separated from the district in the formation of Emamzadeh Abdollah District. The 2016 census measured the population of the village as 107 people in 35 households.
