= Shah Zeyd =

Village in Mazandaran province, Iran

Shah Zeyd Persian: شاه زيد
- Village
- Location within Iran
- Coordinates: 36°12′36″N 52°20′42″E
- Country: Iran
- Province: Mazandaran
- County: Amol
- District: Emamzadeh Abdollah
- Rural District: Chelav

Population (2016)
  - Total: 258
- Time zone: UTC+3:30 (IRST)

Shah Zeyd (Persian: شاه زيد) (Note: Also romanized as Shāh Zeyd; also known as Shāhzāid and Shāh Zeyd-e ‘Olyā) is a village in Chelav Rural District of Emamzadeh Abdollah District in Amol County, Mazandaran province, Iran.

== Demographics ==
=== Population ===
At the time of the 2006 National Census, the village's population was 209 in 59 households, when it was in the Central District. The following census in 2011 counted 149 people in 49 households, by which time the rural district had been separated from the district in the formation of Emamzadeh Abdollah District. The 2016 census measured the population of the village as 258 people in 68 households.
