= Kapin =

Village in Mazandaran Province, Iran

Kapin كپين
- Village
- Location within Iran
- Coordinates: 36°13′59″N 52°15′02″E
- Country: Iran
- Province: Mazandaran
- County: Amol
- Bakhsh: Emamzadeh Abdollah District
- Rural District: Chelav

Population (2006)
  - Total: 350
- Time zone: UTC+3:30 (IRST)

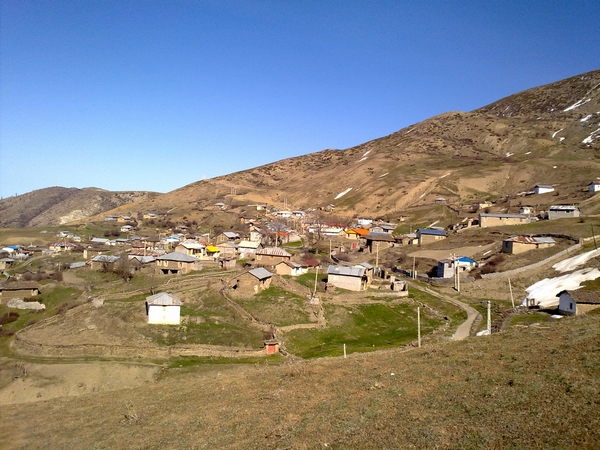

Kapin (Persian: كپين, also Romanized as Kapìn) is a village in Chelav Rural District, in Emamzadeh Abdollah District of Amol County, Mazandaran Province, Iran. At the 2006 census, its population was 350, in 70 families. In 2016, there were no households in the village.
