= Varamdeh =

Village in Mazandaran province, Iran

Varamdeh Persian: ورامده
- Village
- Location within Iran
- Coordinates: 36°26′22″N 52°16′22″E
- Country: Iran
- Province: Mazandaran
- County: Amol
- District: Emamzadeh Abdollah
- Rural District: Bala Khiyaban-e Litkuh

Population (2016)
  - Total: 460
- Time zone: UTC+3:30 (IRST)

Varamdeh (Persian: ورامده) (Note: Also romanized as Vāram Deh, Varām Deh, and Varāmdeh; also known as Varāndeh) is a village in Bala Khiyaban-e Litkuh Rural District of Emamzadeh Abdollah District in Amol County, Mazandaran province, Iran.

== Demographics ==
=== Population ===
At the time of the 2006 National Census, the village's population was 418 in 107 households, when it was in the Central District. The following census in 2011 counted 464 people in 134 households, by which time the rural district had been separated from the district in the formation of Emamzadeh Abdollah District. The 2016 census measured the population of the village as 460 people in 150 households.
