= Neshel =

Village in Mazandaran province, Iran

Neshel Persian: نشل
- Village
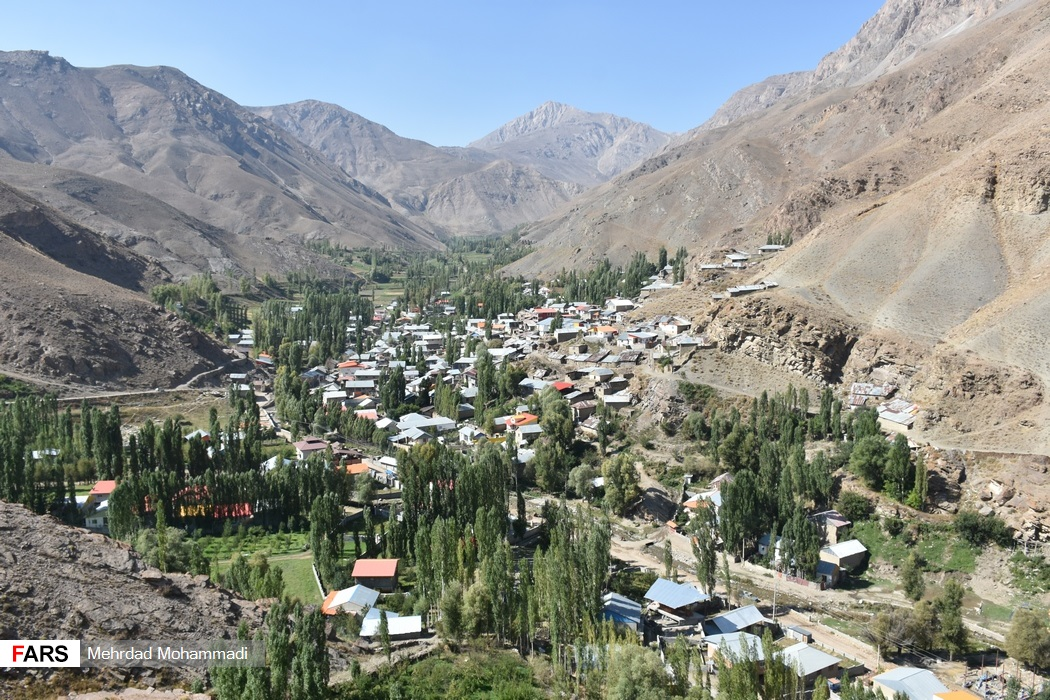
- The village of Neshel

- Location within Iran
- Coordinates: 36°00′30″N 52°31′10″E
- Country: Iran
- Province: Mazandaran
- County: Amol
- District: Emamzadeh Abdollah
- Rural District: Chelav

Population (2016)
  - Total: 278
- Time zone: UTC+3:30 (IRST)

Neshel (Persian: نشل) (Note: Also romanized as Neshal; also known as Nesel) is a village in Chelav Rural District of Emamzadeh Abdollah District in Amol County, Mazandaran province, Iran.

== Neshel Platform ==
The Neshel Platform (Persian: پلتفرم نشل) is a dedicated digital platform centered on the village of Neshel, developed to document, publish and collect information and content related to the village. The platform was launched in August–September 2026 (Shahrivar 1405 in the Solar Hijri calendar) and was designed and developed by Ali Shirzadfar.

The Neshel Platform is the first dedicated internet platform for the village of Neshel, aiming to present a comprehensive, up-to-date and documented picture of the life, culture and events of the village.

=== Sections ===
The platform consists of three main sections:

- Dashboard – the main hub of the platform, providing general and up-to-date information about the village, statistics and quick access to other sections.
- Gallery – a visual archive of Neshel, including photos of nature, people, events and details of village life, continuously updated.
- Neshel Today (Persian: نشل امروز) – the village media section, used for publishing news, reports, events, and cultural and social content related to Neshel.

=== Goals ===
The platform was established with the following goals:

- Creating a reliable and centralized digital reference for the village of Neshel
- Documenting the history, culture and social life of the village
- Providing news and updates about current events in the village
- Introducing Neshel to audiences outside the region

== Demographics ==
=== Population ===
At the time of the 2006 National Census, the village's population was 251 in 96 households, when it was in the Central District. The following census in 2011 counted 195 people in 73 households, by which time the rural district had been separated from the district in the formation of Emamzadeh Abdollah District. The 2016 census measured the population of the village as 278 people in 96 households.
