= Halumsar =

Village in Mazandaran province, Iran

Halumsa Persian: هلومسر
- Village
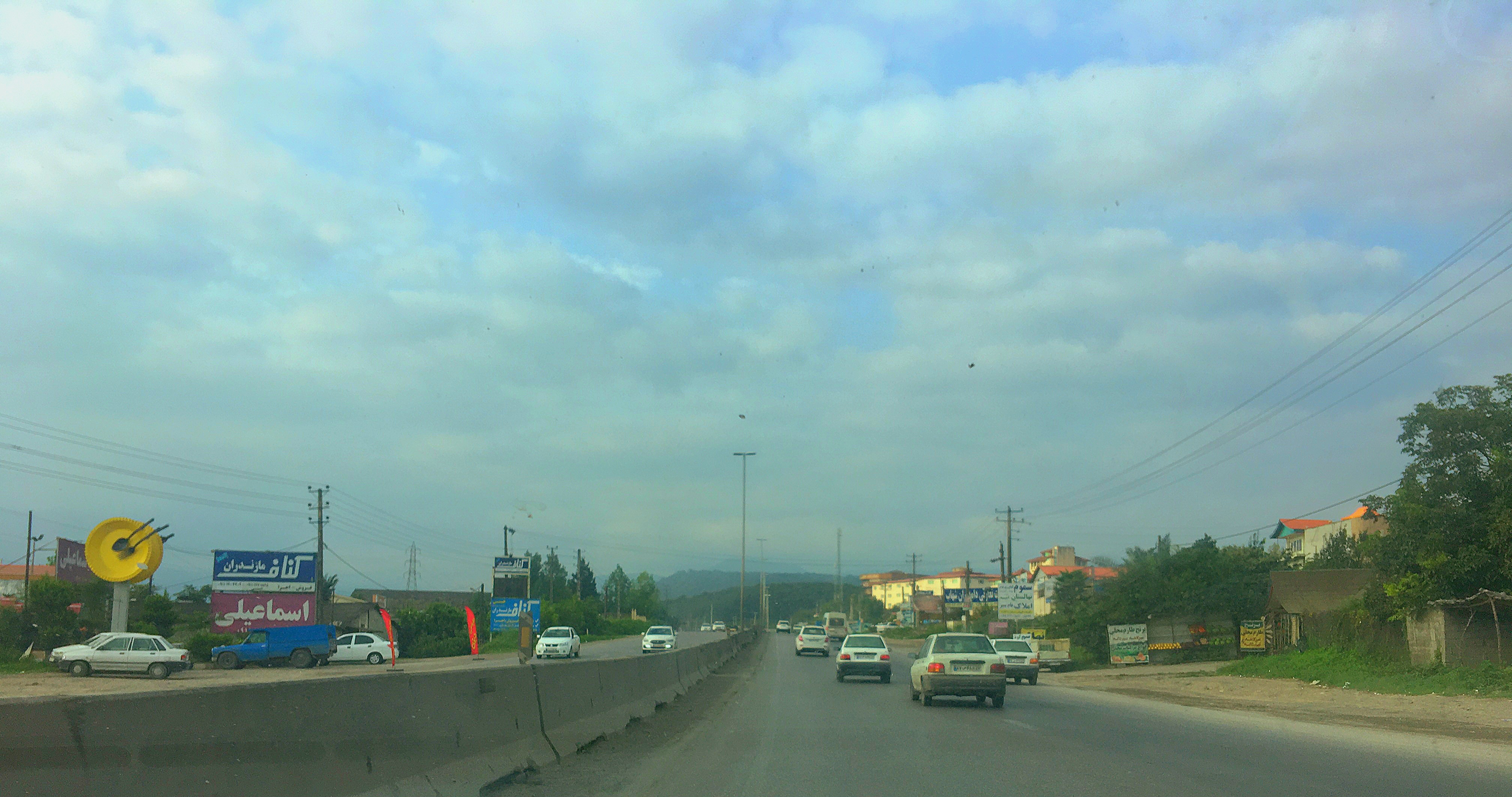
- Haraz Road in Halumsar

- Location within Iran
- Coordinates: 36°24′27″N 52°20′43″E
- Country: Iran
- Province: Mazandaran
- County: Amol
- District: Emamzadeh Abdollah
- Rural District: Bala Khiyaban-e Litkuh

Population (2016)
  - Total: 956
- Time zone: UTC+3:30 (IRST)

Halumsar (Persian: هلومسر) (Note: Also romanized as Halūmsar) is a village in Bala Khiyaban-e Litkuh Rural District of Emamzadeh Abdollah District in Amol County, Mazandaran province, Iran.

== Demographics ==
The village's people speak Mazandarani and Persian and are Shia Muslim.

Villagers have been active in cultivating rice, wheat, barley and walnut. Coal preparation and scarf weaving have also been common among villagers. Before tap water access, the main source of water was Haraz River.

=== Population ===
Halumsar population history
Year	Pop.	±%
1950	170	—
1956	254	+49.4%
1966	389	+53.1%
1976	460	+18.3%
1986	630	+37.0%
2006	778	+23.5%
2011	922	+18.5%
2016	956	+3.7%

Halumsar at the time of the 1966 census had a population of 389 people in 66 households. It has had elementary school, mosque, radio connection and village council. The 1976 census measured a population of 460 in 83 households. In 1986, its population reached 630 in 111 households, and the village gained electricity by that time.

At the time of the 2006 National Census, the village's population was 778 in 188 households, when it was in the Central District. The following census in 2011 counted 922 people in 296 households, by which time the rural district had been separated from the district in the formation of Emamzadeh Abdollah District. The 2016 census measured the population of the village as 956 people in 314 households.
