= Sang Chal =

Village in Mazandaran province, Iran

Sang Chal Persian: سنگ چال
- Village
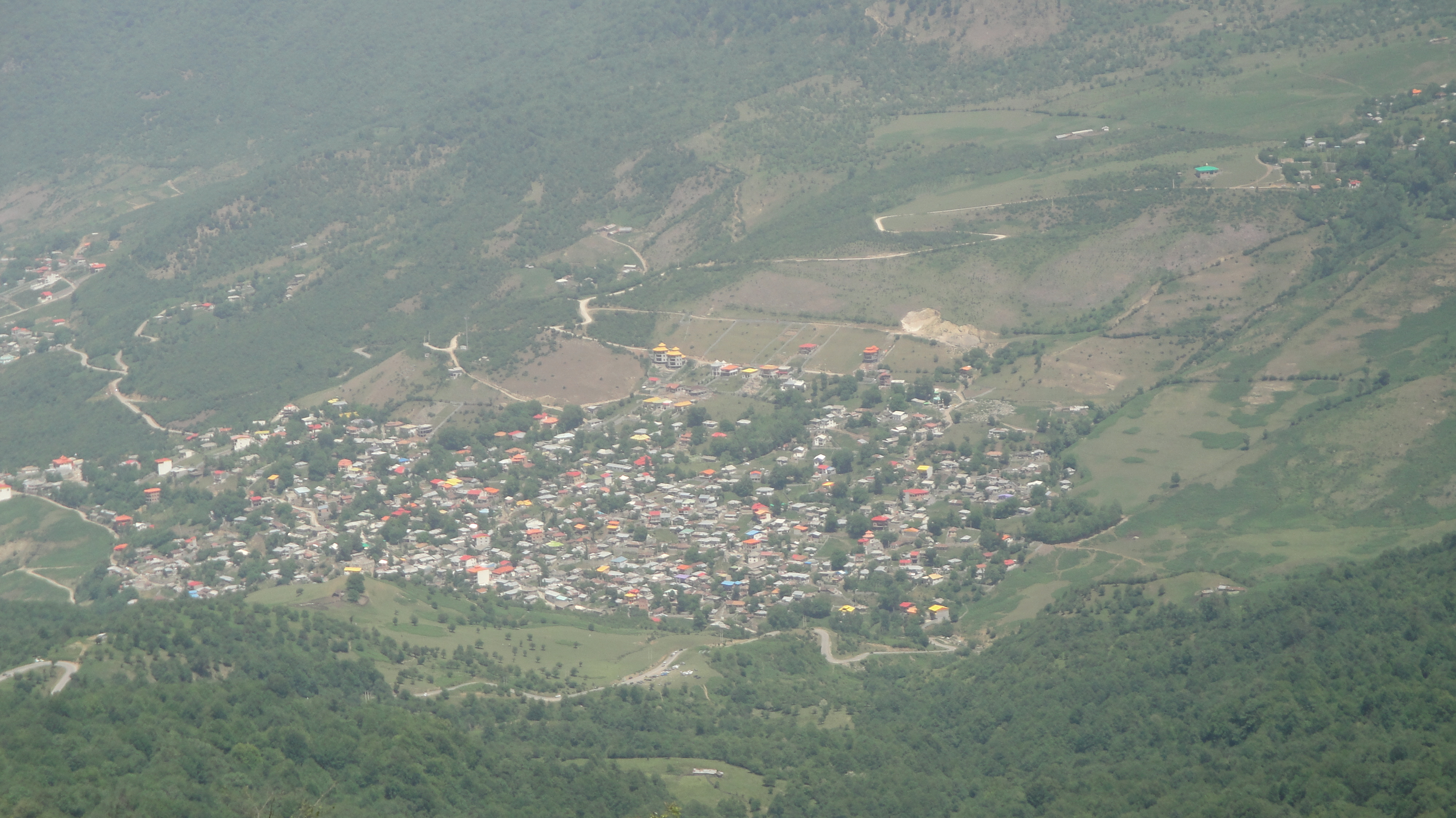
- The village of Sang Chal

- Location within Iran
- Coordinates: 36°11′08″N 52°29′45″E
- Country: Iran
- Province: Mazandaran
- County: Amol
- District: Emamzadeh Abdollah
- Rural District: Chelav

Population (2016)
  - Total: 201
- Time zone: UTC+3:30 (IRST)

Sang Chal (Persian: سنگ چال) (Note: Also romanized as Sang Chāl) is a village in Chelav Rural District of Emamzadeh Abdollah District in Amol County, Mazandaran province, Iran.

== Demographics ==
=== Population ===
At the time of the 2006 National Census, the village's population was 187 in 51 households, when it was in the Central District. The following census in 2011 counted 225 people in 68 households, by which time the rural district had been separated from the district in the formation of Emamzadeh Abdollah District. The 2016 census measured the population of the village as 201 people in 66 households.
