= Lahash, Iran =

Lahash لهاش
- Village
- Location within Iran
- Coordinates: 36°09′38″N 52°22′52″E
- Country: Iran
- Province: Mazandaran
- County: Amol
- Bakhsh: Emamzadeh Abdollah District
- Rural District: Chelav

Population (2016)
  - Total: 37
- Time zone: UTC+3:30 (IRST)

Lahash (Persian: لهاش, also Romanized as Lahāsh and Lehāsh; also known as Lāsh) is a village in Chelav Rural District, in Emamzadeh Abdollah District of Amol County, Mazandaran Province, Iran. At the 2016 census, its population was 37, in 17 families. Increased from 17 people in 2006.
