= Gat Kola =

Village in Chelav Rural District, Amol County, Mazandaran Province, Iran

Gat Kola گت كلا
- Village
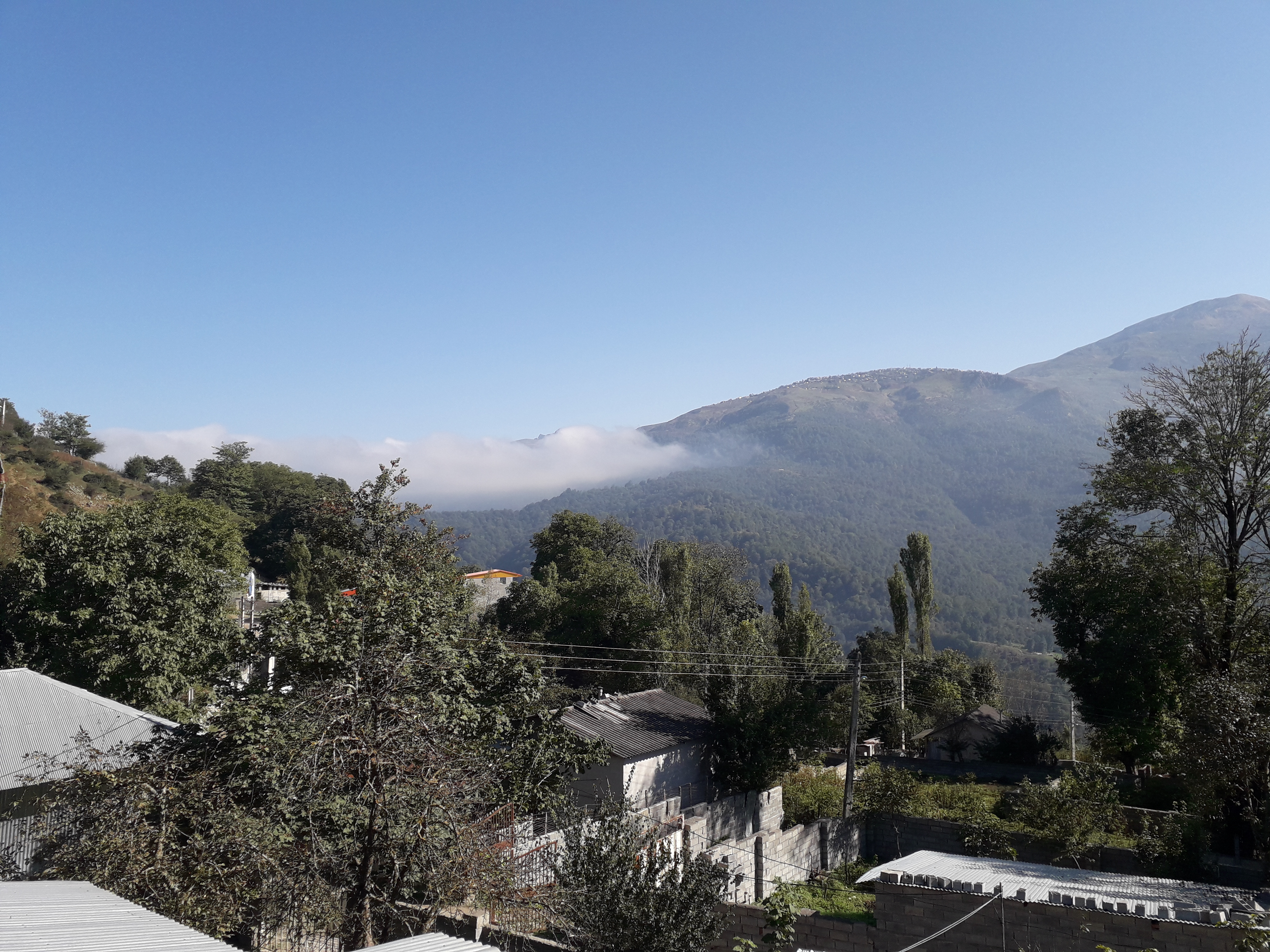

- Location within Iran
- Coordinates: 36°11′39″N 52°30′01″E
- Country: Iran
- Province: Mazandaran
- County: Amol
- Bakhsh: Emamzadeh Abdollah District
- Rural District: Chelav

Population (2016)
  - Total: 66
- Time zone: UTC+3:30 (IRST)

Gat Kola (Persian: گت كلا, also Romanized as Gat Kolā and Gat Kalā; also known as Kat Kolā) is a village in Chelav Rural District, in Emamzadeh Abdollah District of Amol County, Mazandaran Province, Iran. At the 2016 census, its population was 66, in 22 families. Up from 44 people in 2006.
