= Khoshk Rud, Amol =

Village in Mazandaran province, Iran

Khoshk Rud Persian: خشكرود
- Village
- Location within Iran
- Coordinates: 36°25′19″N 52°17′35″E
- Country: Iran
- Province: Mazandaran
- County: Amol
- District: Emamzadeh Abdollah
- Rural District: Bala Khiyaban-e Litkuh

Population (2016)
  - Total: 415
- Time zone: UTC+3:30 (IRST)

Khoshk Rud (Persian: خشكرود) (Note: Also romanized as Khoshk Rūd) is a village in Bala Khiyaban-e Litkuh Rural District of Emamzadeh Abdollah District in Amol County, Mazandaran province, Iran.

== Demographics ==
=== Population ===
At the time of the 2006 National Census, the village's population was 321 in 77 households, when it was in the Central District. The following census in 2011 counted 381 people in 121 households, by which time the rural district had been separated from the district in the formation of Emamzadeh Abdollah District. The 2016 census measured the population of the village as 415 people in 131 households.
