= Gengaraj Kola =

Village in Mazandaran province, Iran

Gengaraj Kola Persian: گنگرج كلا
- Village
- Location within Iran
- Coordinates: 36°11′44″N 52°27′41″E
- Country: Iran
- Province: Mazandaran
- County: Amol
- District: Emamzadeh Abdollah
- Rural District: Chelav

Population (2016)
  - Total: 109
- Time zone: UTC+3:30 (IRST)

Gengaraj Kola (Persian: گنگرج كلا) (Note: Also romanized as Gangaraj Kalā and Gengerej Kolā; also known as Gangar Kolā and Genkaraj Kolā (گنكرج كلا)) is a village in Chelav Rural District of Emamzadeh Abdollah District in Amol County, Mazandaran province, Iran.

== Demographics ==
=== Population ===
At the time of the 2006 National Census, the village's population was 80 in 31 households, when it was in the Central District. The following census in 2011 counted 120 people in 39 households, by which time the rural district had been separated from the district in the formation of Emamzadeh Abdollah District. The 2016 census measured the population of the village as 109 people in 42 households.
