= Zar Khuni =

Zar Khuni زرخونی
- Village
- Location within Iran
- Coordinates: 36°11′32″N 52°28′50″E
- Country: Iran
- Province: Mazandaran
- County: Amol
- Bakhsh: Emamzadeh Abdollah District
- Rural District: Chelav

Population (2016)
  - Total: 48
- Time zone: UTC+3:30 (IRST)

Zar Khuni (Persian: زرخونی, also Romanized as Zar Khūnī) is a village in Chelav Rural District, in Emamzadeh Abdollah District of Amol County, Mazandaran Province, Iran. At the time of the 2016 census, its population was 48 with 18 families(up from 47 in 2006).
