= Khiyaban-e Litkuh =

Khiyaban-e Litkuh (Persian: خيابان ليتكوه) may refer to:

- Bala Khiyaban-e Litkuh Rural District
- Pain Khiyaban-e Litkuh Rural District
