= Chalikiadeh =

Village in Mazandaran province, Iran

Chalikiadeh Persian: چالی کیاده
- Village
- Location within Iran
- Coordinates: 36°26′02″N 52°17′19″E
- Country: Iran
- Province: Mazandaran
- County: Amol
- District: Emamzadeh Abdollah
- Rural District: Bala Khiyaban-e Litkuh

Population (2016)
  - Total: 314
- Time zone: UTC+3:30 (IRST)

Chalikiadeh (Persian: چالی کیاده) (Note: Also romanized as Chālīkīādeh) is a village in Bala Khiyaban-e Litkuh Rural District of Emamzadeh Abdollah District in Amol County, Mazandaran province, Iran.

== Demographics ==
=== Population ===
At the time of the 2006 National Census, the village's population was 283 in 71 households, when it was in the Central District. The following census in 2011 counted 301 people in 89 households, by which time the rural district had been separated from the district in the formation of Emamzadeh Abdollah District. The 2016 census measured the population of the village as 314 people in 100 households.
