= Chameh Ben =

Chameh Ben چمه بن
- Village
- Location within Iran
- Coordinates: 36°11′45″N 52°28′36″E
- Country: Iran
- Province: Mazandaran
- County: Amol
- Bakhsh: Emamzadeh Abdollah District
- Rural District: Chelav

Population (2016)
  - Total: 98
- Time zone: UTC+3:30 (IRST)

Chameh Ben (Persian: چمه بن; also known as Chaman Ben)is a village in Chelav Rural District, in Emamzadeh Abdollah District of Amol County, Mazandaran Province, Iran. At the 2016 census, its population was 98, in 36 families. Increased from 65 people in 2006.
