= Mohammadabad, Amol =

Village in Mazandaran province, Iran

Mohammadabad Persian: محمدآباد
- Village
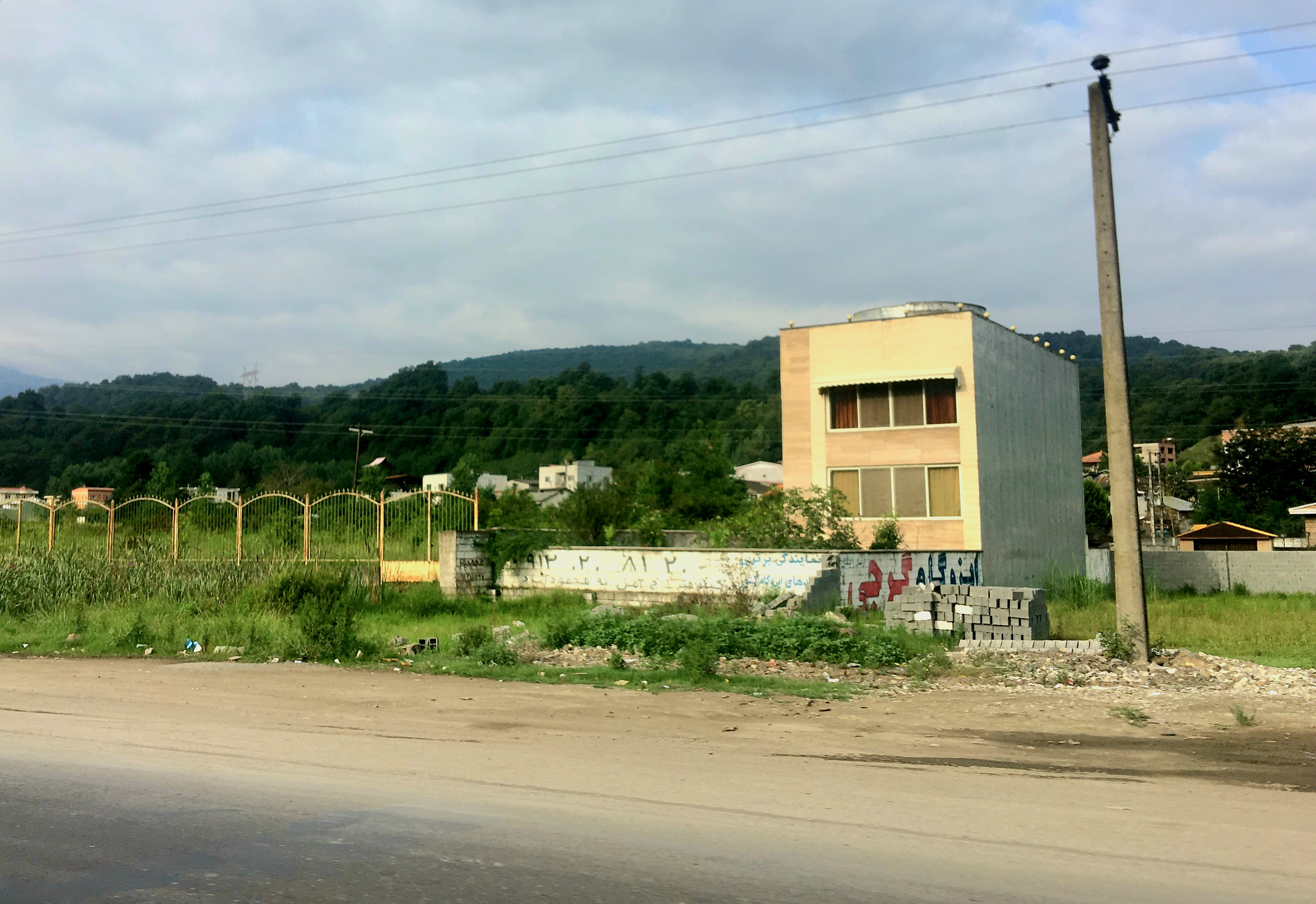
- The village of Mohammadabad

- Location within Iran
- Coordinates: 36°21′51″N 52°21′16″E
- Country: Iran
- Province: Mazandaran
- County: Amol
- District: Emamzadeh Abdollah
- Rural District: Chelav

Population (2016)
  - Total: 986
- Time zone: UTC+3:30 (IRST)

Mohammadabad (Persian: محمدآباد) (Note: Also romanized as Moḩammadābād) is a village in Chelav Rural District of Emamzadeh Abdollah District in Amol County, Mazandaran province, Iran.

== Demographics ==
=== Population ===
At the time of the 2006 National Census, the village's population was 914 in 240 households, when it was in the Central District. The following census in 2011 counted 1,053 people in 336 households, by which time the rural district had been separated from the district in the formation of Emamzadeh Abdollah District. The 2016 census measured the population of the village as 986 people in 324 households.
