= Bozrudasht =

Borzoudasht برزودشت
- Village
- Location within Iran
- Coordinates: 36°03′19″N 52°29′38″E
- Country: Iran
- Province: Mazandaran
- County: Amol
- Bakhsh: Emamzadeh Abdollah District
- Rural District: Chelav

Population (2006)
  - Total: 14
- Time zone: UTC+3:30 (IRST)

Bozrudasht (Persian: بزرودشت, also Romanized as Bozrūdasht; also known as Borzendasht) is a village in Chelav Rural District, in Emamzadeh Abdollah District of Amol County, Mazandaran Province, Iran. At the 2016 census, no household was residing in the village. Decreased from 14 people in 2006.
