= Teliran =

Village in Mazandaran province, Iran

Teliran Persian: تليران
- Village
- Location within Iran
- Coordinates: 36°25′24″N 52°16′44″E
- Country: Iran
- Province: Mazandaran
- County: Amol
- District: Emamzadeh Abdollah
- Rural District: Bala Khiyaban-e Litkuh

Population (2016)
  - Total: 514
- Time zone: UTC+3:30 (IRST)

Teliran (Persian: تليران) (Note: Also romanized as Telīrān) is a village in Bala Khiyaban-e Litkuh Rural District of Emamzadeh Abdollah District in Amol County, Mazandaran province, Iran.

== Demographics ==
=== Population ===
At the time of the 2006 National Census, the village's population was 559 in 148 households, when it was in the Central District. The following census in 2011 counted 518 people in 160 households, by which time the rural district had been separated from the district in the formation of Emamzadeh Abdollah District. The 2016 census measured the population of the village as 514 people in 169 households.
