= Sang Darka =

Village in Mazandaran province, Iran

Sang Darka Persian: سنگ درکا
- Village
- Location within Iran
- Coordinates: 36°20′49″N 52°15′27″E
- Country: Iran
- Province: Mazandaran
- County: Amol
- District: Emamzadeh Abdollah
- Rural District: Bala Khiyaban-e Litkuh

Population (2016)
  - Total: 9
- Time zone: UTC+3:30 (IRST)

Sang Darka (Persian: سنگ درکا) (Note: Also romanized as Sang Darkā; also known as Sang Dargah) is a mountainous village in Bala Khiyaban-e Litkuh Rural District of Emamzadeh Abdollah District in Amol County, Mazandaran province, Iran.

== Demographics ==
=== Language and religion ===
The village's people speak Mazandarani and Persian and are Shia Muslim.

Sang Darka population history
Year	Pop.	±%
1950	230	—
1956	310	+34.8%
1966	97	−68.7%
1976	80	−17.5%
1986	15	−81.2%
2006	10	−33.3%
2011	22	+120.0%
2016	9	−59.1%

=== Population ===
At the time of the 2006 National Census, the village's population was below the reporting threshold, when it was in the Central District. The following census in 2011 counted 22 people in eight households, by which time the rural district had been separated from the district in the formation of Emamzadeh Abdollah District. The 2016 census measured the population of the village as nine people in five households.

== Overview ==
Sang Darka used to be a malaria hotspot due to its temperate climate. The village has had no healthcare or education facilities except for a hammam. Its only agricultural activities are animal husbandry, and dairy and honey products.

It is famous for its waterfall which is inside the Hyrcanian forests. Sang Darka village and waterfall are in the forested northern slopes of the Alborz mountains. Its weather is hot and humid in summer and cool in winter, during which the waterfall may freeze.
