= Khushevash =

Khushevash خوشواش
- Village
- Location within Iran
- Coordinates: 36°14′25″N 52°13′35″E
- Country: Iran
- Province: Mazandaran
- County: Amol
- Bakhsh: Emamzadeh Abdollah District
- Rural District: Chelav

Population (2006)
  - Total: 27
- Time zone: UTC+3:30 (IRST)

Khushevash (Persian: خوشواش, also Romanized as Khūshevāsh) is a village in Chelav Rural District, in the Emamzadeh Abdollah District of Amol County, Mazandaran Province, Iran. At the 2006 census, its population was 27, in 7 families. In 2016, the village had less than 4 households.

== Notable residents ==
- Davoud Samadi Amoli, Cleric
