= Alimestan =

Alimestan اليمستان
- Village
- Location within Iran
- Coordinates: 36°09′51″N 52°23′43″E
- Country: Iran
- Province: Mazandaran
- County: Amol
- Bakhsh: Emamzadeh Abdollah
- Rural District: Chelav
- Elevation: 1,600 m (5,200 ft)

Population (2016)
  - Total: 70
- Time zone: UTC+3:30 (IRST)

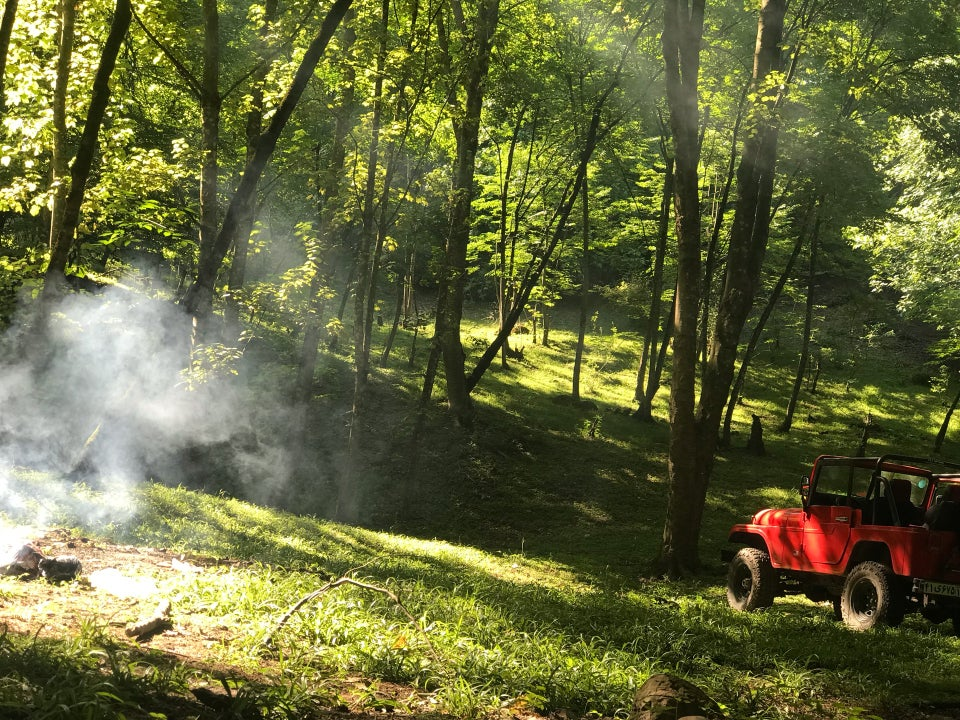
Alimestan Forest

Alimestan (Persian: اليمستان, known as Alimastan also Romanized as Alīmestān; also known as ‘Alamestān and Alamestān) is a village in Chelav Rural District, in Emamzadeh Abdollah District of Amol County, Mazandaran Province, Iran.

== Geography ==
Alimestan is 48 km (30 mi) south of Amol's city center and 3 km (1.9 mi) east of Haraz River valley. In a forested area of the central Alborz range.

== Demographics ==
People of Alimestan speak the Amoli dialect of the Mazanderani language, and their agricultural products are Cereal, Honey, and Animal product. People of the village have been Shia muslim.

At the 2016 census, the village's population was 70, in 23 families. Increased from 9 people in 2006.

َ Alimestan population history
Year	Pop.	±%
1950	145	—
1956	70	−51.7%
1966	60	−14.3%
1976	36	−40.0%
1986	39	+8.3%
2006	9	−76.9%
2016	70	+677.8%

== Sights ==
The Alimastan jungle is nicknamed 'Iran's Green Gold', Despite the lack of tourist facilities and accommodations, it is a popular tourist destination village short-term camping and mountaineering. Imamzadeh Qasem mausoleum is another tourist attraction of the village.
