= Kolard =

Kolard كلرد
- Village
- Location within Iran
- Coordinates: 36°15′52″N 52°22′05″E
- Country: Iran
- Province: Mazandaran
- County: Amol
- Bakhsh: Emamzadeh Abdollah
- Rural District: Chelav

Population (2006)
  - Total: 13
- Time zone: UTC+3:30 (IRST)

cleard (Persian: كلرد) is a village in Chelav Rural District, in Emamzadeh Abdollah District of Amol County, Mazandaran Province, Iran. At the 2006 census, its population was 13, in 4 families. In 2016, the village had less than 4 households.
