= Najjar Kola, Amol =

Najjar Kola نجاركلا
- Village
- Location within Iran
- Coordinates: 36°11′55″N 52°25′34″E
- Country: Iran
- Province: Mazandaran
- County: Amol
- Bakhsh: Emamzadeh Abdollah District
- Rural District: Chelav

Population (2016)
  - Total: 55
- Time zone: UTC+3:30 (IRST)

Najjar Kola (Persian: نجاركلا, also Romanized as Najjār Kolā) is a village in Chelav Rural District, in Emamzadeh Abdollah District of Amol County, Mazandaran Province, Iran. At the 2016 census, its population was 55 in 20 families. Up from 46 people in 2006.
