= Tiar, Iran =

Tiar تيار
- Village
- Location within Iran
- Coordinates: 36°11′14″N 52°26′36″E
- Country: Iran
- Province: Mazandaran
- County: Amol
- Bakhsh: Emamzadeh Abdollah District
- Rural District: Chelav

Population (2016)
  - Total: 97
- Time zone: UTC+3:30 (IRST)

Tiar (Persian: تيار, also Romanized as Tīār; also known as Nīāl and Tiaf) is a village in Chelav Rural District, in Emamzadeh Abdollah District of Amol County, Mazandaran Province, Iran. At the 2016 census, its population was 97, in 35 families. Up from 88 people in 2006.
