= Kandeva =

Kandeva كندوا
- Village
- Location within Iran
- Coordinates: 36°08′15″N 52°21′45″E
- Country: Iran
- Province: Mazandaran
- County: Amol
- Bakhsh: Central
- Rural District: Chelav

Population (2016)
  - Total: 49
- Time zone: UTC+3:30 (IRST)

Kandeva (Persian: كندوا, also Romanized as Kandevā) is a village in Chelav Rural District, in Emamzadeh Abdollah District of Amol County, Mazandaran Province, Iran. At the 2016 census, its population was 49, in 16 families. Increased from 14 people in 2006.
