= Kamarbon =

Kamarbon (Persian: كمربن) may refer to:

- Kamarbon, Amol
- Kamarbon, Nur
