= Chandar Mahalleh =

Village in Mazandaran province, Iran

Chandar Mahalleh Persian: چندرمحله
- Village
- Location within Iran
- Coordinates: 36°25′37″N 52°18′53″E
- Country: Iran
- Province: Mazandaran
- County: Amol
- District: Emamzadeh Abdollah
- Rural District: Bala Khiyaban-e Litkuh

Population (2016)
  - Total: 886
- Time zone: UTC+3:30 (IRST)

Chandar Mahalleh (Persian: چندرمحله) (Note: Also romanized as Chandar Maḩalleh) is a village in Bala Khiyaban-e Litkuh Rural District of Emamzadeh Abdollah District in Amol County, Mazandaran province, Iran.

== Demographics ==
=== Population ===
At the time of the 2006 National Census, the village's population was 850 in 188 households, when it was in the Central District. The following census in 2011 counted 783 people in 243 households, by which time the rural district had been separated from the district in the formation of Emamzadeh Abdollah District. The 2016 census measured the population of the village as 886 people in 257 households.
