= Andvar =

Village in Mazandaran province, Iran

Andvar Persian: اندوار
- Village
- Location within Iran
- Coordinates: 36°03′45″N 52°28′35″E
- Country: Iran
- Province: Mazandaran
- County: Amol
- District: Emamzadeh Abdollah
- Rural District: Chelav

Population (2016)
  - Total: 182
- Time zone: UTC+3:30 (IRST)

Andvar (Persian: اندوار) (Note: Also romanized as Andavar, Andevar, and Andevār) is a village in Chelav Rural District of Emamzadeh Abdollah District in Amol County, Mazandaran province, Iran.

== Demographics ==
=== Population ===
At the time of the 2006 National Census, the village's population was 226 in 54 households, when it was in the Central District. The following census in 2011 counted 157 people in 50 households, by which time the rural district had been separated from the district in the formation of Emamzadeh Abdollah District. The 2016 census measured the population of the village as 182 people in 61 households.
