= Marijan, Amol =

Coordinates: 36°03′32″N 52°19′29″E

Marijan مريجان
- Village
- Interactive map of Marijan
- Country: Iran
- Province: Mazandaran
- County: Amol
- Bakhsh: Emamzadeh Abdollah District
- Rural District: Chelav

Population (2006)
  - Total: 28
- Time zone: UTC+3:30 (IRST)

Marijan (Persian: مريجان, also Romanized as Marījān) is a village in Chelav Rural District, in Emamzadeh Abdollah District of Amol County, Mazandaran Province, Iran. At the 2006 census, its population was 28 people. In 2016, there were no households residing in the village.
