= Chelav Rural District =

Rural district in Mazandaran province, Iran

Chelav Rural District Persian: دهستان چلاو
- Rural District
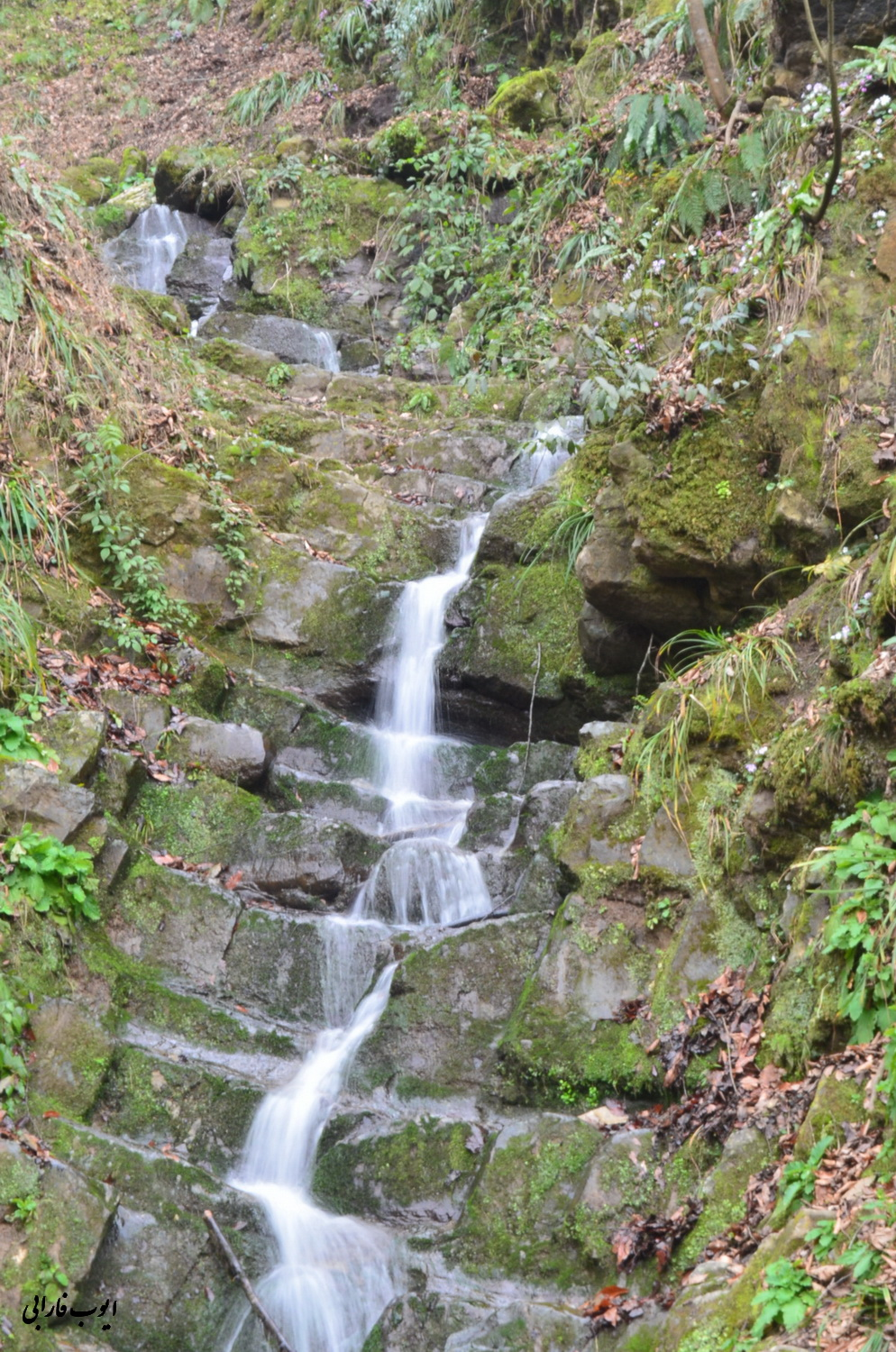
- Waterfall in Chelav Rural District

- Location within Iran
- Coordinates: 36°10′N 52°21′E
- Country: Iran
- Province: Mazandaran
- County: Amol
- District: Emamzadeh Abdollah
- Established: 1987
- Capital: Razakeh

Population (2016)
  - Total: 4,720
- Time zone: UTC+3:30 (IRST)

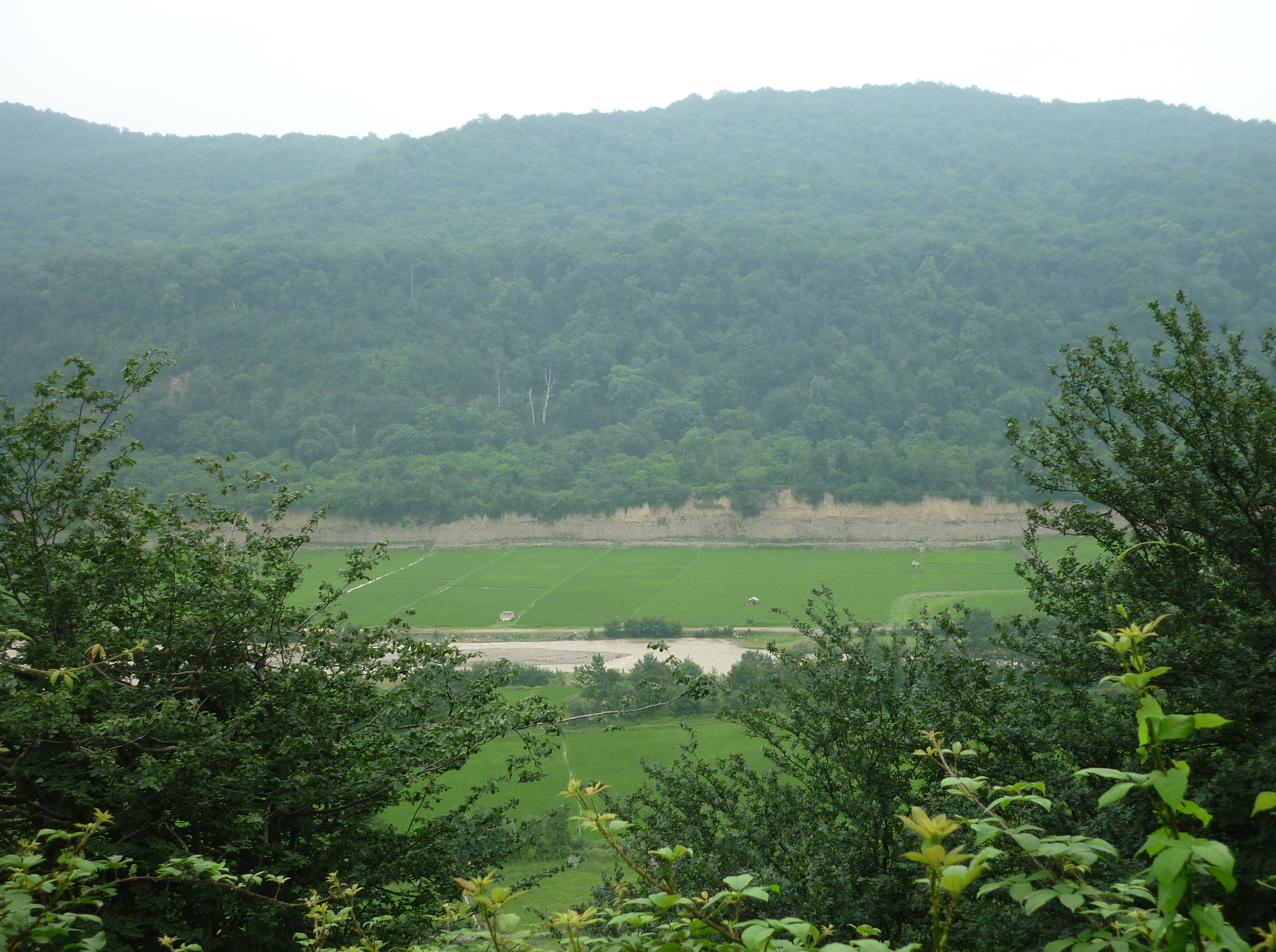
Rice fields in the Haraz Valley

Chelav Rural District (Persian: دهستان چلاو) is in Emamzadeh Abdollah District of Amol County, Mazandaran province, Iran. Its capital is the village of Razakeh.

== Demographics ==
=== Population ===
At the time of the 2006 National Census, the rural district's population (as a part of the Central District) was 4,247 in 1,154 households. There were 4,463 inhabitants in 1,389 households at the following census of 2011, by which time the rural district had been separated from the district in the formation of Emamzadeh Abdollah District. The 2016 census measured the population of the rural district as 4,720 in 1,544 households. The most populous of its 49 villages was Razakeh, with 1,599 people.

=== Other villages in the rural district ===
- Alimestan
- Andvar
- Bozrudasht
- Chameh Ben
- Gat Kola
- Genkaraj Kola
- Kamarbon
- Kandeva
- Kapin
- Kherem
- Khushevash
- Kolard
- Lahash
- Marijan
- Mohammadabad
- Najjar Kola
- Neshel
- Paran
- Parimeh
- Pasha Kola
- Sang Chal
- Shah Zeyd
- Tiar
- Zar Khuni
