= Kamarbon, Amol =

Kamarbon كمربن
- Village
- Location within Iran
- Coordinates: 36°13′00″N 52°17′40″E
- Country: Iran
- Province: Mazandaran
- County: Amol
- Bakhsh: Emamzadeh Abdollah
- Rural District: Chelav

Population (2006)
  - Total: 24
- Time zone: UTC+3:30 (IRST)

Kamarbon (Persian: كمربن; also known as Kamarīn) is a village in Chelav Rural District, in the Emamzadeh Abdollah District of Amol County, Mazandaran Province, Iran. At the 2006 census, its population was 24, in 5 families. The village had less than 4 households.
