= Emamzadeh Abdollah, Amol =

City in Mazandaran province, Iran

Emamzadeh Abdollah Persian: امامزاده عبدالله
- City
- Location within Iran
- Coordinates: 36°24′23″N 52°18′30″E
- Country: Iran
- Province: Mazandaran
- County: Amol
- District: Emamzadeh Abdollah
- Established as a city: 2012

Population (2016)
  - Total: 5,768
- Time zone: UTC+3:30 (IRST)

Emamzadeh Abdollah (Persian: امامزاده عبدالله) (Note: Also romanized as Emāmzādeh ‘Abdollāh; formerly Esku Mahalleh (اسكومحله), also romanized as Eskū Maḩalleh, Oskoo Mahalleh, and Oskū Maḩalleh; also known as Oskū Mahalīeh) is a city in, and the capital of, Emamzadeh Abdollah District in Amol County, Mazandaran province, Iran. It also serves as the administrative center for Bala Khiyaban-e Litkuh Rural District.

== Demographics ==
=== Population ===
At the time of the 2006 National Census, the population was 3,940 in 938 households, when it was the village of Esku Mahalleh in Bala Khiyaban-e Litkuh Rural District of the Central District. The following census in 2011 counted 4,505 people in 1,282 households, by which time the rural district had been separated from the district in the formation of Emamzadeh Abdollah District. Esku Mahalleh was merged with the villages of Espand and Kasemdeh and renamed Emamzadeh Abdollah. The 2016 census measured the population as 5,768 people in 1,809 households, when the village had been converted to a city.
