= Bala Khiyaban-e Litkuh Rural District =

Rural district in Mazandaran province, Iran

Bala Khiyaban-e Litkuh Rural District Persian: دهستان بالا خيابان ليتكوه
- Rural District
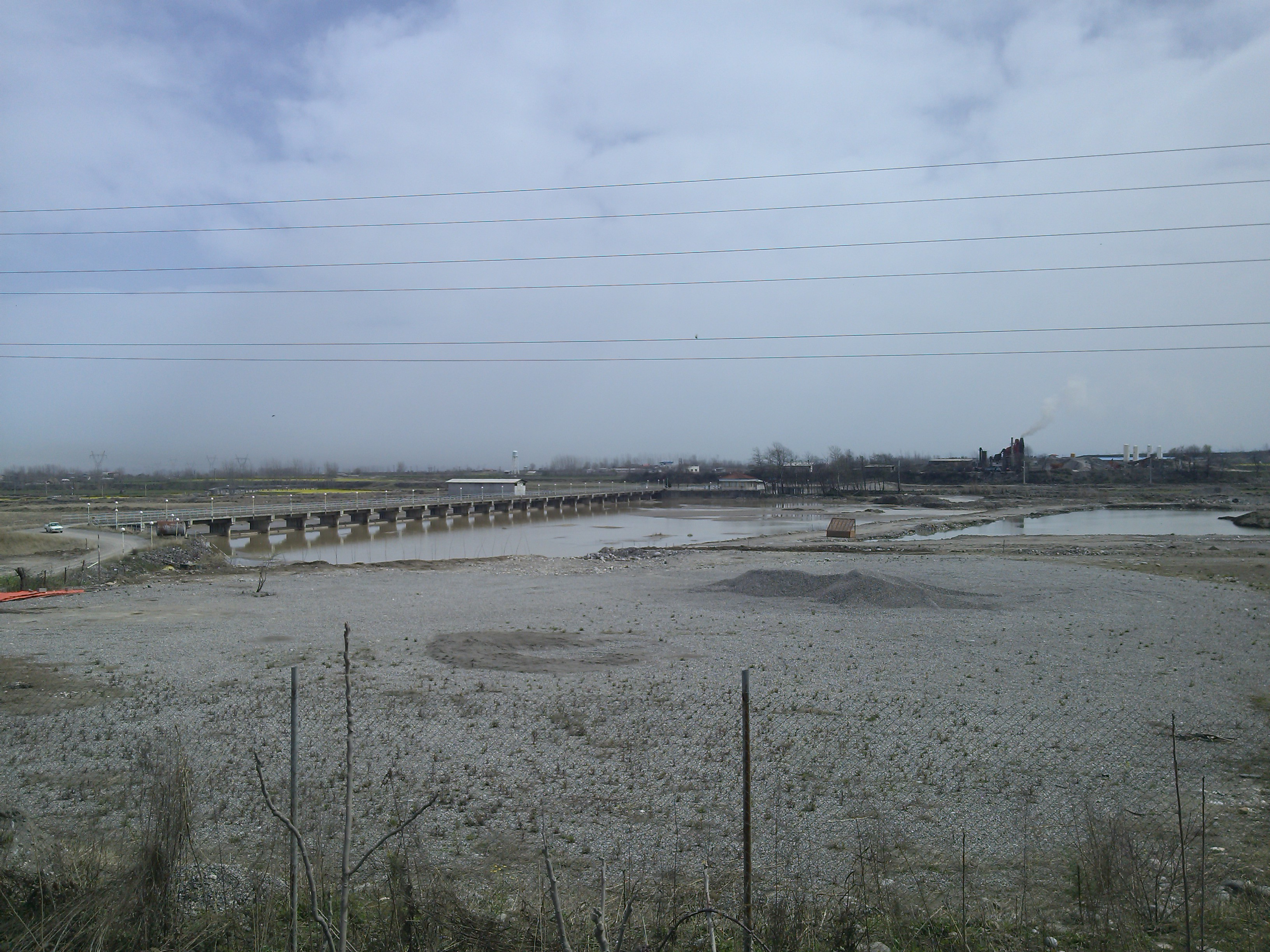
- Hezar Sangar Dam

- Location within Iran
- Coordinates: 36°22′N 52°17′E
- Country: Iran
- Province: Mazandaran
- County: Amol
- District: Emamzadeh Abdollah
- Established: 1987
- Capital: Emamzadeh Abdollah

Population (2016)
  - Total: 7,303
- Time zone: UTC+3:30 (IRST)

Bala Khiyaban-e Litkuh Rural District (Persian: دهستان بالا اخيابان ليتكوه) is in Emamzadeh Abdollah District of Amol County, Mazandaran province, Iran. It is administered from the city of Emamzadeh Abdollah. (Note: Formerly Esku Mahalleh)

== Demographics ==
=== Population ===
At the time of the 2006 National Census, the rural district's population (as a part of the Central District) was 22,171 in 5,533 households. There were 11,605 inhabitants in 3,415 households at the census of 2011, by which time the rural district had been separated from the district in the formation of Emamzadeh Abdollah District. The 2016 census measured the population of the rural district as 7,303 in 2,284 households. The most populous of its 15 villages was Marzan Kola, with 1,456 people.

=== Other villages in the rural district ===
- Ali Jangal
- Chalikiadeh
- Chandar Mahalleh
- Divraz
- Halumsar
- Khoshk Rud
- Mikhran
- Nowgardan
- Sang Darka
- Sehri
- Teliran
- Toskabon
- Varamdeh
