= Emamzadeh Abdollah District =

District in Mazandaran province, Iran

Emamzadeh Abdollah District Persian: بخش امامزاده عبدالله
- District
- Location within Iran
- Coordinates: 36°11′N 52°21′E
- Country: Iran
- Province: Mazandaran
- County: Amol
- Established: 2010
- Capital: Emamzadeh Abdollah

Population (2016)
  - Total: 17,791
- Time zone: UTC+3:30 (IRST)

Emamzadeh Abdollah District (Persian: بخش امامزاده عبدالله) is in Amol County, Mazandaran province, Iran. Its capital is the city of Emamzadeh Abdollah.

== History ==
In 2010, Bala Khiyaban-e Litkuh and Chelav Rural Districts were separated from the Central District in the formation of Emamzadeh Abdollah District. The village of Emamzadeh Abdollah was converted to a city in 2012.

== Demographics ==
=== Population ===
The National Census in 2011 counted 16,068 people in 4,804 households. The 2016 census measured the population of the district as 17,791 inhabitants in 5,637 households.

=== Administrative divisions ===
Emamzadeh Abdollah District Population
Administrative Divisions	2011	2016
Bala Khiyaban-e Litkuh RD	11,605	7,303
Chelav RD	4,463	4,720
Emamzadeh Abdollah (city) (Note: Formerly the village of Esku Mahalleh)		5,768
Total	16,068	17,791
RD = Rural District
