= List of cities, towns and villages in Mazandaran province =

A list of cities, towns and villages in Mazandaran Province of northern Iran:

== Alphabetical ==
Cities are in bold text; all others are villages.

=== A ===
Ab Ask | Ab Bakhshan | Ab Bandan Kash | Ab Bandan Nonush | Ab Bandan Sar | Ab Chin | Ab Dang Sar | Ab Kuleh Sar-e Bozorg | Ab Kuleh Sar-e Kuchak | Ab Saraft | Abadeh | Abandanak | Abbas Ali Kash | Abbas Kola | Abbas Kola | Abbas Kola | Abbasa | Abbasabad | Abbasabad | Abbasabad-e Holum Sar | Abd ol Manaf | Abdangesar | Abdol Deh | Abdollahabad | Abdollahabad | Abdollahi | Ab-e Garm | Abelu | Abjar | Abmal | Abmal | Aboksar | Aboksar | Abu Kheyl-e Arateh | Abu Mahalleh | Abu ol Hasan Kola | Abu ol Hasanabad | Afra Gardan | Afra Kati va Lu Kola | Afra Koti | Afra Koti | Afra Koti-ye Mir Ali Tabar | Afra Sara | Afra Takht | Afra | Afrabon-e Do | Afrachal | Afradeh | Afrapol | Afrasi | Afrasi | Afrasiab Kola | Afrasiab Kola | Afratakht | Afratakht | Afsaneh Sara | Afte Let | Aghuz Darreh | Aghuz Galleh | Aghuz Kaleh | Aghuz Koti | Aghuz Koti | Aghuz Koti | Aghuz Koti | Aghuzbon | Aghuzbon | Aghuzbon | Aghuzchal | Aghuzdarbon | Ahak Chal | Ahan Sar | Ahangar Kola | Ahangar Kola | Ahangar Kola | Ahangar Kola | Ahangar Kola | Ahangar Kola | Ahangar Kola | Ahangar Kola | Ahangar Kola | Ahangar Kola | Ahangar Kola-ye Now Kandeh | Ahangar Kola-ye Olya | Ahangar Kola-ye Sofla | Ahankoti | Ahi Dasht | Ahi Mahalleh | Ahlam | Ahmad Kola | Ahmad Sara | Ahmadabad | Ahmadabad-e Kalij-e Olya | Ahmadabad-e Kalij-e Sofla | Ahu Dasht | Ahu Dasht | Air Force Camp | Air Force Integrated Residential Housing | Ajand | Ajarostaq | Akand | Akaneh | Akbarabad | Akbarabad | Akbarabad-e Bala | Akbarabad-e Chalus | Akbarabad-e Pain | Akerd | Akha | Akhazir | Akhmen | Akhteh Chi | Akhund Mahalleh | Akhvor Sar | Akhvord | Aktij Kola | Al Darreh | Al Tappeh | Alamdar Deh | Alamdar | Alamdeh-e Gharbi | Alamdeh-e Sharqi | Alamshir | Alaraz | Alarazbum | Alasht | Alavi Kola | Alavi Kola-ye Mir | Aleban | Alem Kola | Alendan | Ali Darreh | Ali Jangal | Ali Kola | Ali Kola | Ali Kola-ye Ahi | Ali Koti | Ali Zamin | Ali Zarnu | Aliabad | Aliabad | Aliabad | Aliabad | Aliabad | Aliabad | Aliabad | Aliabad | Aliabad-e Asgarkhan | Aliabad-e Chalus | Aliabad-e Faqih Mahalleh | Aliabad-e Mir | Alibak | Alika | Alimestan | Alkaleh | Allah Band | Allah Chal | Allah Kaj | Allah Marz | Allah Marz | Allah Rudbar | Alu | Alukandeh | Alvi Kola | Aminabad | Aminabad | Amir Deh | Amir Kola | Amir Kola | Amir Rud | Amirabad | Amirabad | Amirabad | Amirabad | Amirkola | Ammariyeh | Amol | Amreh | Amreh | Anand | Anar Din | Anar Jar | Anar Marz | Anarestan | Anarom | Anbardeh | Anbarsar | Andar Koli | Andarvar | Anderat | Andi Kola | Andvar | Angas | Angeh Fam | Angerud | Angeta Rud-e Pain | Angil | Anguran | Anheh | Anj Pol | Anjil Nesam | Anjil Si Kabud Tabar | Anjilak | Anjil-e Si-ye Yek | Anna Deh | Ansari Mahalleh | Aq Mashhad | Aq Mashhad-e Kamar Kheyl | Aqa Mohammadabad | Aqa Molk | Aqa Moqim Mahalleh | Aqeh Kheyl | Ara | Arab Kheyl | Arab Kheyl | Arab Kheyl | Arab Kheyl | Arab Mahalleh | Arabeh Galleh | Arat Bon | Arateh Dasht | Archi | Ard Kola | Ardeshir Mahalleh | Arfa Deh | Ari | Arim | Arim | Arka | Armak | Armich Kola | Armu | Army Beach | Arud | Arus Koti | Arva Kheyl | Arvij Kola | Arzak | Arzefun | Arzet | Arzhang Rudbar | Asadabad | Asadabad | Asal Mahalleh | Asalam Dasht | Asb-e Shur Pey | Asdollahabad | Aseh | Asel Poshteh | Asgarabad | Asgariabad | Ash Mahalleh | Ashir | Ashireh Sar | Ashkur Mahalleh | Ashrafabad | Asiab Sar | Asiab Sar | Asiab Sar | Asiab Sar | Asiab Sar | Aski Mahalleh | Aski Mahalleh | Aspahi Kola | Asram | Astal Kenar | Astan-e Karud | Astaneh Sar | Atini | Atrab | Atu | Avijdan | Avil | Ayeshbon-e Olya | Ayeshbon-e Sofla | Aysi Kola | Azad Bon | Azademun | Azan Deh | Azan | Azaran | Azarchal | Azarkal | Azarsi Hattem | Azarsi | Azarsi | Azarsi-ye Babal Konar | Azarsi-ye Hoseyn Khanzadeh | Azarsi-ye Nematollah | Azarsi-ye Sadollah | Azarsi-ye Taskanu | Azimabad | Azimiyeh | Azizabad | Azizak | Azni | Azrudsar |

=== B ===
Ba Ujkhil | Baba Kola | Babaabad | Babakan | Babalkan-e Olya | Babalkan-e Sofla | Babol | Babol Posht | Babolsar | Babulat | Badabsar | Badeleh | Badeleh Darreh | Bagh Dasht | Baghban Kola | Baghban Kola | Bagh-e Nazar | Bagh-e Sorkhabad | Bahar Poshteh | Baharabad | Baharestan | Bahmanan | Bahnemir | Bajdam | Bakhtiar Koti | Bala Abdang | Bala Afrakoti | Bala Ahmad Chaleh Pey | Bala Ahmad Kola | Bala Bandar Kheyl | Bala Bazyar | Bala Bisheh Sar | Bala Bowra | Bala Dasteh-ye Rakan Kola | Bala Deh | Bala Deza | Bala Do Ab | Bala Eshtuj | Bala Ganj Afruz | Bala Golema | Bala Hashtal | Bala Jir Kuh | Bala Joneyd-e Lakpol | Bala Keru Kola | Bala Kula | Bala Lamuk | Bala Marzbal | Bala Marznak | Bala Mir Kola | Bala Moallem Kola | Bala Naqib Kola | Bala Rostam Hajji | Bala Sang Rizeh | Bala Serest | Bala Seyyed Kola | Bala Shir Rud | Bala Valik | Bala Zarrin Kola | Balaband | Baladeh | Balas | Balef Kola-ye Gharbi | Balef Kola-ye Sharqi | Baleyran | Bamasi | Bamer Kola | Bamoti | Banafsheh Deh | Banafsheh Deh | Band Bon | Bandafruz | Bandar Kola-ye Aghowzin | Bandar-e Olya | Bandar-e Sofla | Bandbon | Bandbon-e Kabud Tabar | Band-e Beni | Band-e Bon | Band-e Bon | Bandesar | Bandpey | Banesar Kola | Baqer Tangeh | Baraniganun | Barar | Barar Deh | Barar Deh | Bard | Barf Kola | Bargeh | Bari Kola | Bari Kola | Barik Absar | Barik Kola | Barik Mahalleh | Barkala | Barkan | Barseh | Barsemnan | Barsibur | Basl Kuh | Basra-ye Bala | Basra-ye Pain | Bastam | Batlim | Baudeh-ye Olya | Baudeh-ye Sofla | Baye Kola | Baye Kola | Bayjan | Bazar Mahalleh | Bazar Sar | Baziar Kola | Bazir Kola | Bazyar Kheyl | Beh Bonak | Beh Kaleh | Behjatabad | Behkaleh | Behshahr | Behzad Kola | Belvij | Bengar Kola | Benjkul-e Sofla | Beramsar | Berenjestanak | Berijan | Berma-ye Ashrostaq | Berma-ye Zarem Rud | Bernat | Beshel | Betaher Kola | Bez Cheft | Bezaminabad | Bi Kola | Bi Namad | Bibi Kola | Bijdeh-ye Now | Biji Kola | Bikar Ayesh | Bil Pey-e Abu ol Hasan Kola | Bin | Binamaz | Bis Koti | Bish Mahalleh | Bish Mahalleh | Bisheh Boneh | Bisheh Kola | Bisheh Kola | Bisheh Mahalleh | Bisheh Sar | Bizaki | Bol | Boneh Kenar | Bordun | Borjandeh | Borji Kheyl-e Langur | Borji-ye Kheyl | Boz Rud Pey | Bozminan | Bozorg Bisheh-ye Mahalleh | Bozrudasht | Bu ol Qalam | Buleh Kola | Buleh Kola-ye Marzunabad | Bulideh | Bundeh | Bur Khani | Bur Kheyl | Bur Kheyl-e Arateh | Bur Mahalleh | Buran | Bursar | Buteh Deh

=== C ===
Caspian Residential Complex | Chachkam | Chafa | Chaft-e Kola | Chahar Afra | Chahar Gol Ali Mohammad | Chahar Rudbar | Chahar Shamin | Chahar Si Abbasi | Chahar Taq Bon | Chaharsi | Chak Sar | Chak Sara | Chakadeh | Chakhani | Chaksar | Chal Raz | Chal Sarun | Chal Zamin | Chala Sar | Chalajur | Chalakrud | Chalandar | Chaleh Siah | Chaleh Zamin | Chalek Deh | Chali | Chalikiadeh | Chalmardi | Chalmian | Chalu Pol | Chalu | Chalu | Chalu | Chalus | Chaman | Chamar Kuh | Chamaz Deh | Chamaz Kola | Chamaz Koti | Chamaz Tappeh | Chamazak | Chamazin | Chameh Ben | Chamestan | Chammaz Kola | Chamrandeh | Chandar Mahalleh | Chang Mian | Changaz | Chaq-e Firuzjai | Chareh Sar | Chareh | Chareh | Charez | Charkh Kati | Charmi | Charokhchi Mahalleh | Chasorka | Chau Sar Mahalleh | Cheft Sar | Cheft Sara Kand | Cheh Sar | Chehreh | Chelrood | Chenar Bon | Chenar Bon | Chenar Bon | Chenar Bon | Chenar Bon | Chenar Bon-e Keshteli | Chenarbon | Chenes | Chepi | Cherat | Cheshmeh Sar | Chetan | Chilak-e Olya | Chilak-e Sofla | Chin Parch | Choft Sar | Choft Sar | Chub Bast | Chubagh | Chupan Boneh-ye Ajand | Chupan Kola | Churan | Churet | Churteh |

=== D ===
Dabudasht | Dadu Kola | Dalak Kheyl | Dalasam | Dalir | Damad Kola | Damir Kola | Damir | Dang Sarak | Dangepia | Dangsarak | Danial | Daq Langeh | Dar Kola | Dar Kola | Dar Mazar | Darab Kola | Darabdin-e Rowshan | Darasara | Darbar | Dard Kashet | Dari Kandeh | Darjan | Darjar | Darka Rudbar | Darka Sar | Darkala-ye Olya | Darkapey | Darreh Dom | Darreh Kenar | Darun Kola-ye Gharbi | Darun Kola-ye Sharqi | Darupey | Darvar | Darvish Khak-e Bala | Darvish Khak-e Marzun | Darvish Khak-e Pain | Darvish Khalak | Darvish Kola | Darvish Mohammad Shah | Darvish Sara | Darvishabad | Darvishan | Darya Poshteh | Darya Sar | Daryek | Darzi Kola | Darzi Kola | Darzi Kola | Darzi Kola | Darzi Kola | Darzi Kola-ye Aqa Shafi | Darzi Kola-ye Bozorg | Darzi Kola-ye Karim Kola | Darzi Kola-ye Kuchek | Darzi Mahalleh | Darzi Mahalleh | Darzi Mahalleh | Darzi Naqib Kola | Darzikola-ye Akhund-e Baba | Darzikola-ye Akhundi-ye Bala | Darzikola-ye Akhundi-ye Pain | Darzikola-ye Nasirai | Darzikola-ye Navshirvan | Das Darreh | Dasht-e Naz Airport | Dasht-e Nazir | Dashtian | Dau Kola | Davilat | Davud Kola | Davud Kola-ye Estaneh Sar | Dazmir Kandeh | Deh Char | Deh Kalan | Deh Mian | Deh Shahr | Dehak | Dehi | Dehkhoda | Dehnar | Delavar Kola | Delavar Kola | Delgosha | Denj Kola | Deram | Deraseleh | Deraz Kesh | Deraz Kola | Deraz Lat | Deraz Mahalleh | Deraz Zamin | Derazan | Deyeh | Diafeh | Didu | Dimarun | Dimturan | Dimu | Dinak | Dinan | Dinar Sara | Dineh Sar | Dineh Sar-e Rakan Kola | Disar | Div Dasht | Div Kola-ye Alimun | Div Kola-ye Olya | Div Kola-ye Sofla | Div Koti | Diva Molkshah | Diva Omran | Divran | Divraz | Diz Posht | Dizabad | Dizer Kola | Dizin Kola | Diznu | Do Ab Training Camp | Do Ab | Do Ab-e Kojur | Do Tireh | Dolmarz | Dom Sara | Dormah Kola | Dowgol Station | Dowlat Rud Bar | Dowlatabad | Dowqanlu | Dowr Ab | Dozdak | Dozdak | Dozdband | Dughi Kola | Dujeh Ganeh | Dujman | Duk | Dun Sar | Dunay-e Olya | Dunay-e Sofla | Dunchal | Dunkuh

=== E ===
Edmola | Ejbar Kola | Ekra Sar | Elit | Elyerd | Emaft | Emam Dasht | Emam Kola | Emam Zamin | Emamdeh | Emamiyeh | Emamrud | Emamzadeh Abbas | Emamzadeh Ali | Emamzadeh Ali | Emamzadeh Khalifeh | Emamzadeh Mahmud | Emamzadeh Qasem | Emamzadeh Reza | Eram | Eram | Ervat | Esas | Esbu Kola | Esbu Kola | Esbu Kola | Esbu Kola-ye Karim Kola | Esbu | Esfandan | Esfandiar Mahalleh | Esfivashi | Eshkar Kola | Eshkardasht | Eshkarlet | Eshqabad | Eskandar Kola | Eskandeh | Eskard | Eskardin | Esku Mahalleh | Eslam Mahalleh | Eslamabad, Savadkuh | Eslamabad | Eslamabad | Eslamabad | Eslamabad | Eslamabad | Eslamdeh | Esmail Aqa Mahalleh | Esmail Kola-ye Bozorg | Esmail Kola-ye Kuchek | Esmail Mahalleh | Espand | Esparz | Espi Kola | Espi Kola-ye Ramnet | Espi Rud | Espiarbon | Espiar-e Molk | Espiyari | Espu Kola | Espurez | Estakhr Sar | Estakhr Sar | Estakhr Sar | Estakhr-e Posht | Estarabad Mahalleh | Estarem | Esterdikola | Evard | Evat | Eyfi | Ezbaran | Eznabad | Ezzat | Ezzat ol Din | Ezzatabad

=== F ===
Falka | Faqih Mahalleh | Faqihabad | Farahabad | Farahabad | Farahabad-e Kheyl | Farajabad | Farajabad | Faram Lek | Faram Rudbar Hajji Sadeq | Faramarz Kola | Faramdeh | Farim | Farimak | Farrash Kola-ye Olya | Farrash Kola-ye Sofla | Fek | Fenderi | Fenderi-ye Nam Avar Kola | Ferem | Fereydun Kola | Fereydunkenar | Feshkur | Fetkash | Feyzollahabad | Filband | Fireh | Firuz Ja-ye Sabet | Firuz Kandeh-ye Olya | Firuz Kandeh-ye Sofla | Firuz Kola-ye Olya | Firuz Kola-ye Olya | Firuz Kola-ye Sofla | Firuz Kola-ye Sofla | Firuz Kola-ye Vosta | Firuzabad | Firuzabad | Firuzabad | Folurd | Fulad Kola | Fulad Kola | Fulad Kola | Fulad Kola | Furija | Futom-e Olya | Futom-e Sofla

=== G ===
Gahvareh Poshteh | Galan | Galand Rud | Galesh Kola | Galesh Kola | Galesh Kola | Galesh Kola-ye Bala | Galesh Kola-ye Pain | Galesh Mahalleh | Galesh Mahalleh | Galesh Pol | Galleh Kola | Galleh Kola-ye Kar Kandeh | Galugah | Galugah | Gandab | Gandyab-e Bala | Gandyab-e Pain | Ganj Kola-ye Bala | Ganj Kola-ye Pain | Gardanbori-ye Olya | Gardanbori-ye Sofla | Gardeshi | Garikesh | Gariveh | Garkesh | Garm Khani | Garm Rud | Garma Poshteh | Garmabak | Garmestan | Garmich | Garna | Garrudbar | Garzin Kheyl | Gashnian | Gat Cheshmeh | Gat Kola | Gatab | Gat-e Kash | Gateh-ye Now | Gavan Ahangar | Gavan Kola | Gavan Kola | Gavlimak | Gavpol | Gavramak | Gavzan Mahalleh | Gavzan Mahalleh | Gavzan Mahalleh-ye Rudbast | Gazanak | Gazaneh | Gazna Sara | Gazneh Kola | Gel Jari | Gel Kheyl | Gel Mahalleh | Geleh Mahalleh | Geleyerd | Gelian | Gelin | Gelvard-e Bozorg | Gelvard-e Kuchek | Gelyard | Genkaraj Kola | Geraku | Gerd Ab | Gharib Mahalleh | Ghias Kola | Gholami | Ghuzak-e Rudbar | Gijan | Gil Kola | Gil Kola | Gil Mahalleh | Gilabad | Gilandeh | Gilapey | Gilas | Gileh Kola | Gileh Kola-ye Olya | Gileh Kola-ye Sofla | Gol Afshan | Gol Bagh | Gol Bestan | Gol Chal Sar | Gol Chigi | Gol Chini | Gol Chub | Gol Mahalleh | Gol Mazar | Gol Mohammad Langeh | Gol Neshin | Gol Pasha | Golamreh | Goldasht | Gol-e Aliabad | Goleh Dun | Golestan Mahalleh | Goli Jan | Golkah | Golurd | Golur-e Bala | Goramjan | Gord Rudbar | Gorg Taj | Gorji Kola | Gorji Mahalleh | Gorji Pol | Gorji Sara | Gorjiabad | Gornam | Gory Mahalleh | Gowhar Kola | Gug Bagh | Gugin | Guhar Sara | Gushi Kola | Gushti Kola | Guytar-e Olya | Guytar-e Sofla

=== H ===
Habibabad | Hachirud | Haft Tanan | Hajjateh | Hajji Dela | Hajji Kola | Hajji Kola | Hajji Kola | Hajji Kola | Hajji Kola | Hajji Kola | Hajji Kola | Hajji Kola | Hajji Kola | Hajji Kola-ye Arazlu | Hajji Kola-ye Olya | Hajji Kola-ye Sanam | Hajji Kola-ye Sofla | Hajji Mahalleh | Hajjiabad | Hajjiabad | Hajjiabad | Hajjiabad | Hajjiabad | Hajjiabad | Halal Kola | Halavan-e Pain | Haleh Kaleh | Halestan | Hali Bagh | Hali Bon | Hali Khal | Hali Koti | Hali Koti | Halidasht | Halikoti | Haliyhuman | Halu Kaleh | Halu Poshteh | Halumsar | Ham Chan | Hameshbur | Hamidabad | Hamsafa | Hamzeh Deh-e Olya | Hamzeh Deh-e Sofla | Hamzeh Kola-ye Shesh Pol | Hamzeh Reza | Hamzehabad | Har Do Ab Rud | Har Do Rud | Harabdeh | Haratbar | Hardow Rud | Hareh | Hareh Pak | Hari Kandeh | Harijan | Haris | Harun Kola | Hasan Sara | Hasanabad | Hasanabad | Hasanabad | Hasanabad | Hasanabad | Hashtari | Hatam Sara | Hatar | Hatkeh Posht | Hatkehlu | Hemmatabad | Hemmatabad | Hemmatabad | Hendu Kola | Hendu Marz | Henduri | Herteh Kola | Hevela | Heydar Kola | Heydarabad | Heydarabad | Heyrat | Hezar Khal | Hezar Som | Homrud Bon | Horrabad | Hoseynabad | Hoseynabad | Hoseynabad | Hoseynabad | Hoseynabad | Hoseynabad | Hoseynabad | Hoseynabad | Hoseynabad-e Olya | Hoseynabad-e Sofla | Howz Koti | Hular-e Olya

=== I ===
Idin | Il | Ilal | Ira | Irka | Isa Khandaq | Isardeh | Iva | Ivek | Ivel | Ivim | Izad Kheyl | Izadshahr | Izkhvor Deh | Izki

=== J ===
Jafar Kola | Jafarabad | Jafarabad | Jajan | Jalameh | Jal-e Akhund Mahalleh | Jal-e Chala Sar | Jali Kola | Jalikan-e Olya | Jalikan-e Sofla | Jalilabad | Jalirud | Jam Khaneh | Jamal Kola | Jamal ol Din Kola | Jamshidabad | Jandin | Javaher Deh | Javarem | Jelu | Jenasem | Jennat Rudbar | Jezin | Jijad | Jirband | Jir-e Balan | Jisa-ye Danial | Jisa-ye Kelarabad | Jisa-ye Khezrabad | Jorreh Sar | Juja Deh-e Arateh | Juni Kola | Jur Jadeh | Jura Kola | Jurband | Jurband | Juybar

=== K ===
Kabud Kalayeh | Kabud Kola | Kabud Kola | Kabutardan | Kachab Mahalleh | Kachal Deh | Kachap-e Kolva | Kachap-e Olya | Kachap-e Sofla | Kafak | Kafarat | Kafkur | Kafshgar Kola | Kafshgar Kola-ye Arateh | Kaftar Kar | Kahar Kenar-e Keshtali | Kahlu Kaj | Kahrud | Kajarestaq | Kakerun | Kal Posht | Kal Quchal | Kala | Kalachpa | Kalaj | Kalaj Khuseh | Kalak | Kalak | Kalanga | Kalarijan | Kalavangah | Kalayeh Bon | Kalayeh | Kal-e Lat | Kaleh | Kalenow-e Olya | Kalenow-e Sofla | Kalhu Dasht-e Bala | Kalhu Dasht-e Pain | Kali Kola | Kalij Kheyl | Kalij Kuh | Kalik Sar | Kalik | Kalim | Kalin Khuni | Kalishom | Kalkenar | Kalleh Bast | Kalleh Bon | Kalmadan-e Naqib | Kalmahr | Kalusa | Kam Kola | Kam | Kamal Chub Sar | Kamangar Kola | Kamangar Kola | Kamangar Kola | Kamangar | Kamar Kola | Kamar Posht | Kamarbon | Kamarbon | Kamiliyeh | Kamiun | Kamp-e Sad Lar | Kand Saban | Kand Sar | Kandelu | Kandeva | Kandis Kola | Kandolus | Kandusar | Kang Sar | Kangar | Kangelo | Kanij Kola | Kanslu | Kapin | Kapur Chal | Kar Chang | Kar Fun | Kar Kam | Kar Kandeh | Kar Nam | Kar Salar | Karaf | Karajub Konar | Karat Chal | Karat Kallehlu | Karat Koti | Karat Si | Karat-e Kalleh | Karatkuti | Karbon | Karchak-e Larijani | Karchak-e Navai | Karchi Kola | Kardar Kola | Kardegar Mahalleh | Kardegar Mahalleh | Kardgar Khatir | Kardgar Kola | Kardgar Kola | Kardi Kola | Kari Kola | Kari Kola | Kari Kola | Karim Kola | Karimabad | Karimabad | Karistu | Karkuh | Karmozd | Karsam | Kartich Kola | Kartij Kola | Karun | Kaseb Mahalleh | Kasegar Kola | Kasegar Mahalleh | Kasegar Mahalleh | Kaseh Gar Mahalleh | Kaseman Kola | Kasemdeh | Kash Masi | Kash Pey | Kashi Kola | Kashi Mahalleh | Kashir Mahalleh | Kashka | Kashkak | Kashku | Kateh Posht-e Olya | Kati Sar | Kati Sar | Katra | Katrim | Katrulat | Kava Darreh | Kava | Kavat | Kaveh Malek | Kazem Beyki | Kazem Kola | Kazemabad | Kebria Kola | Kefa | Kelachan | Kelagar Kola | Kelagar Mahalleh | Kelagar Mahalleh | Kelagar Mahalleh | Kelak-e Olya | Kelak-e Sofla | Kelarabad | Kelarabad | Kelarak | Kelarak | Kelardasht | Keleri | Kelich Kola | Kelikan | Kenar Anjam | Kenar Rud | Kenarvar | Kendelek | Kenes Darreh | Kenespa | Kenet | Kenis | Kerdabad | Kerfu Kola | Kerman | Kerva | Kesh Garma | Ketalem and Sadat Shahr | Ketel Emamzadeh Hashem | Keya Kola | Khachak | Khaland | Khal-e Kheyl | Khalil Kola | Khalil Kola | Khalil Shahr | Khalkhal Mahalleh-ye Jadid | Khalkhal Mahalleh-ye Qadim | Khamand | Khan Abbasi | Khaneh Sar Marz | Khaneh Sar | Khanian | Khar Kesh | Khar Khun | Khar Yek | Kharab-e Mian Rud | Kharabeh Khvoshrud Pey | Khard Mard-e Anisi | Khard Mard-e Rezai | Khardun Kola | Kharji Kola | Kharkak | Kharman Kola | Kharmian | Kharrat Kola | Kharrat Kola | Khartusi | Khas Kola | Khashkala | Khatib Kola | Khatib Kola | Khatib | Khatir Kola | Khatt-e Ahi | Kherem | Khesht Sar | Kheyrabad | Kheyrud Kenar | Khezr Konar | Khezrabad | Khezr-e Tireh | Khir Sar | Khojir Kola | Kholard | Khom Gardan | Khomir Kandeh | Khonar Darvish | Khonarabad | Khor Deh Larim | Khorasan Mahalleh | Khoriun | Khorma Kola | Khormakahn Shahrakhi | Khorram Chammaz | Khorramabad | Khorramabad | Khorramabad | Khorramabad-e Dineh Sar | Khoshk Bur | Khoshk Darreh | Khoshk Rud | Khoshk Rud | Khoshkrud | Khoshkrud | Khowban Razgah | Khuni Sar | Khunkah Zarzameh | Khush Rudpey | Khushal | Khushevash | Khvajeh Kola | Khvajeh Kola | Khvordun Kola | Khvoriyeh | Khvorshid Kola | Khvorshid | Khvorshidabad | Khvortab-e Rudbar | Khvosh Neshan | Khvosh Rudbar | Khvoshab | Ki Kola | Kia Kola | Kia Kola | Kia Mahalleh | Kia Pey | Kiab Sar | Kiadeh | Kiakola | Kiasar | Kiasar | Kikha Mahalleh | Kikuh | Kinch | Kis | Kis | Kis | Kit | Kiun | Kochanak | Kochid | Kodir | Kodir Sar | Kohneh Dan | Kohneh Deh | Kohneh Deh | Kohneh Kumeh | Kohneh Patak | Kohneh Sara | Kojur | Kola Gar Sara | Kola Gar Sara | Kola Kardeh | Kola Kardeh | Kola Kheyl | Kola Mahalleh | Kola Rudbar | Kola Safa | Kola Shakank | Kola | Kolaksar | Kolamak | Kolar Darreh | Kolard | Kolemarz-e Olya | Kolemeh | Kolengeh | Kolet | Kolik | Kolkat | Kolu Deh | Kolya | Kom Kola | Komdarreh | Komishan | Komor Rud | Kones Ku | Kones-e Marz | Konesi | Konim | Konta | Kor Cha | Korasb | Korchi | Kord Kheyl | Kord Kheyl | Kord Kheyl | Kord Kheyl | Kord Kheyl | Kord Kola | Kord Mahalleh | Kord Mahalleh | Kord Mahalleh | Kord Mahalleh | Kord Mir | Kordab | Kordi Chal | Kordi Kola | Kordkoti | Korf | Korsi Kola | Korsi | Koshk-e Sara | Kosut | Kotalleh Sara | Koti Lateh | Kotir | Kuchak Bisheh-ye Mahalleh | Kuh Par | Kuh Pareh | Kuh Sar | Kuh-e Estel | Kuhestan | Kuhi Kheyl | Kuhikheyl | Kuhpar-e Olya | Kuhpar-e Sofla | Kuhpayeh Sara | Kuhsar Kandeh | Kuk Deh | Kukandeh | Kuner | Kurkursar-e Olya | Kuseh Raz | Kuti Bazar | Kutna | Kuy Sahab ol Zeman

=== L ===
Lafurak | Laharem Taluk | Lahash | Laher | Lai-ye Pasand | Lai-ye Rudbar | Lajim | Lak Dasht | Lak Dasht | Lak Tarash | Lak Tarashan | Lakowm | Lakterashan | Lala | Lalard | Lal-e Tazehabad | Laleh Zar Koti | Lalim | Laluk | Laluk | Lamarun | Lamrad | Lamsu Kola | Lamsu Kola-ye Gharbi | Lamzer | Langar | Langur-e Bala | Langur-e Pain | Lapa Sar | Lapa Sarak | Lapar Ali Baba Mohammadi | Lapu Sahra | Larak | Larazneh | Larema | Largan | Largan | Largdasht | Larim | Larjar Gardan | Laru Sar | Lasem | Lash Kenar | Lashak | Lashgarak | Lashkenar | Lashsar | Lashtu | Laskuti | Lat Konar | Lat Kumeh | Lat Mahalleh | Lat Siah Moshteh | Latak | Latar | Latarnesa | Lat-e Disar | Lateh | Latergaz-e Olya | Latergaz-e Sofla | Lati Kola | Lati | Latingan | Laysah | Lazarbon | Lazir | Ledar | Lehmal | Lemrask | Lend | Lengeh | Levarchal | Ley Talar | Leyeh | Liarden | Ligah | Ligush | Likar | Limak | Limakadeh | Limakesh | Limun | Limundeh | Lind | Lireh Sar | Lis Koti | Lisi | Loj | Lorsanvar | Lotfaliabad | Lowlak-e Kaslian | Lowlet | Lowsar | Ludasht | Lujandeh | Luleh Deh | Lut

=== M ===
Machak Posht | Macheh Bon | Madan-e Zirab | Mahajarabad | Mahalleh Kola | Mahar Mijeh | Mahdi Kheyl | Mahdiabad | Mahforujak | Mahforuz Mahalleh-ye Olya | Mahforuz Mahalleh-ye Sofla | Mahmudabad | Mahmudabad | Mahut Kola | Maji Koti | Maji | Majidabad | Mak Rud | Maka Rud | Makar | Makarud | Makran | Mal Khast | Malafeh | Malar | Malek Kheyl | Malek Kola | Malekabad-e Bala | Malekabad-e Pain | Maleyek | Mali Darreh | Mamerz Kan | Mamerz Si | Mamraz Koti | Mandi Mahalleh | Mangelab | Mangol | Manjir | Mansur Kandeh | Mansurabad | Manuchehr Kola | Manzel Darreh | Maran | Marandeh | Maras-e Bozorg | Maras-e Kuchak | Marat Shahr | Marat-e Balkarun | March | Margav-e Olya | Margav-e Sofla | Margir Deh | Marij Mahalleh | Marijan | Marijan | Markoti | Marmat | Marzak | Marzan Kola | Marzanabad | Marzandeh | Marzangu | Marzbal | Marzi Darreh | Marzikola | Marzrud | Marzy Koti Teyebi | Mas Darreh | Masal | Mashaollahabad | Mashhad Sara | Mashhadi Kola | Mashhadi Kola | Mashhadi Sara | Mashown Kola | Masir Mahalleh | Mask | Maskun | Maskupa | Masumabad | Masumabad | Matan Kola | Mateh Kola | Mateh Kola | Matekeh | Mateverij | Mati Kola | Matka-ye Rudbar| Matkuh | Mavarem Kola | Maz va Langa Sar | Mazandaran Mahalleh | Mazarostaq | Mazdakati | Mazdeh | Mazga | Mazid | Mazraeh-ye Naim | Mazraeh-ye Vastmin | Mazres | Mazubaghsar | Mazubon-e Olya | Mazubon-e Sofla | Mazulangeh | Mazuposhteh | Mecher | Mehdi Rajeh | Mehdiabad | Mehdiabad | Mehdiabad | Mehdiabad | Mehdiabad | Mehleban | Mehrabad-e Chaft Sar | Melerd | Mellij Galleh | Memshi | Meres | Meri | Mesedeh | Meshkabad-e Bala | Meshkabad-e Pain | Metkazin | Meydan Sar | Meydan Sar-e Keshteli | Meydanak | Mi Kola | Mian Bal | Mian Bura | Mian Daj Mahalleh | Mian Darreh | Mian Dasht | Mian Deh | Mian Galleh | Mian Kasiady | Mian Kolmarz | Mian Kuh | Mian Lat | Mian Mahalleh | Mian Melk | Mian Rud | Mian Rud | Mian Rud | Mian Rud | Mian Rud | Mian Rud | Mian Rud | Mian Rudbar | Mian Sara | Mian Talak | Mian Talar Hoseyni | Miana | Mianak | Mianak | Mianak | Miandasteh | Miandeh | Mianki | Miankuh Mahalleh | Miankuh Sadat | Miar Kola | Michkar | Mij | Mijlar | Mikhran | Mileh | Minak | Mir Afzal-e Vavsar | Mir Alamdeh | Mir Bazar | Mir Kola | Mir Molk | Mir Rud Posht | Mir Shams ol Din | Mirar Kola | Mirdeh-ye Olya | Mirdeh-ye Sofla | Mirna | Mirud | Mistan | Moallem Kola | Moallem Kola | Moallem Kola | Moallem Kuh | Mofti Kola | Moghan Deh | Mohammad Hoseynabad | Mohammadabad | Mohammadabad | Mohammadabad | Mohammadabad | Mohammadabad | Mohammadabad | Mohammadabad | Mohsenabad | Mojtame-ye Meskuni Aram | Mojtame-ye Meskuni Farhangian | Mojtame-ye Meskuni Khaneh Darya | Mojtame-ye Meskuni Neka Chub | Mojtame-ye Meskuni Shahid Abbaspur | Mojtame-ye Meskuni Shahrak-e Azadegan | Mojtame-ye Meskuni Siman | Molkar | Molla Azim Razgah | Molla Hajji Mahalleh | Molla Kheyl-e Lai | Molla Kheyl-e Purva | Molla Kola | Molla Kola | Molla Kola | Molla Kola | Molla Kola | Molla Mahalleh | Molla Mahalleh | Monas Kola | Monqar Pey | Moqam | Moqri Kola | Moqri Kola | Morad Chal | Mordab | Morsam | Mosayyeb Mahalleh | Moslemabad | Motahhar-e Olya | Motahhar-e Sofla | Mowmenabad | Mozaffar Kola | Mula | Mumej Kheyl | Munj | Musa Kheyl | Musa Kola | Musa Kola | Musa Mahalleh | Musaabad | Muzi Bagh | Muzi Bon | Muzi Koti | Muzi Koti Park | Muzi Koti-ye Olya | Muzi Koti-ye Sofla | Muzigaleh |

=== N ===
Nabiabad | Nadak | Nafar Kheyl | Naft Chal | Naft Chal | Naft Chal | Nahar | Nahiyeh | Naijabad | Naimabad | Najjar Deh | Najjar Kola | Najjar Kola | Najjar Kola | Najjar Kola-ye Jadid | Najjar Kola-ye Qadim | Najjar Mahalleh | Nakh Kola | Namak Chal | Namak Darreh | Namar | Namiun Anjil Si-ye Chahar | Nandal | Nanva Kola | Naqib Deh | Naqib Kola-ye Salas | Naqqarchi Mahalleh | Naram | Naras | Narenj Bandben | Narenjbon | Narenjlu | Narges Kati | Narges Koti | Narges Marz | Narges Zamin | Nargisan | Narivaran-e Gharbi | Narivaran-e Sharqi | Narneh | Naserabad | Naserabad | Naserabad | Nashtarud | Nasieh | Nasirabad | Nasirabad | Natal | Nater | Navai Kola | Navai Mahalleh | Navy Camp | Nedaf Kheyl | Neka | Nematabad | Nematabad | Nematabad | Neqarechi Mahalleh | Nesam Gam | Nesel | Nesen | Neshel | Neva | Ney Kola | Neyrang | Neytal | Nezam Mahalleh | Nezamabad | Niak | Niala | Nichkuh | Niknam Deh | Nim Chah | Nimvar | Nires | Noj | Nomudar Kola | Nosrat Kola | Nosratabad | Nosratabad | Now Deh | Now Deh | Now Deh | Now Deh | Now Deh | Now Deh | Now Deh | Now Dehak | Now Dehak | Now Kandeh | Now Kola | Now Kola | Now Shirvan Kola | Nowabad | Nowabad | Nowabad | Nowabad | Nowgardan | Nowgiri | Nowsar | Nowshahr | Nowzarabad | Nukajar | Nukres | Nur ol Din Mahalleh | Nur | Nursar | Nusha

=== O ===
Oja-Beyt | Ojak | Ojak Sar | Olvi Kola | Ormak Mahalleh | Orost | Osman Kola | Otaq Sar | Otaq Sara | Owbon | Owja Kolah | Owja Mahalleh | Owjabandan | Owjak | Owji Talar | Owjiabad | Owkreka | Owksar | Owksar-e Karim Kola | Owmal | Owmal-e Estad Ahmad | Owmal-e Shakrollah | Own Kenar | Owrim | Owrim Rudbar | Owsa | Owz | Owzkola | Ozar

=== P ===
Paband | Pachet | Pachi | Pahn Kesh | Pahnab Mahalleh | Pahnaji | Pahnavar | Pahnedar | Pahneh Kola-ye Jonubi | Pahneh Kola-ye Shomali | Pain Afrakoti | Pain Ahmad Chaleh Pey | Pain Ahmad Kola | Pain Bazyar | Pain Bisheh Sar | Pain Dasteh-ye Rakan Kola | Pain Deza | Pain Do Ab | Pain Eshtuj | Pain Ganj Afruz | Pain Golema | Pain Hashtal | Pain Hular | Pain Jadeh | Pain Karu Kola | Pain Kula | Pain Lamuk | Pain Mahalleh-ye Keshteli | Pain Malik | Pain Marzbal | Pain Marznak | Pain Mir Kola | Pain Moallem Kola | Pain Naqib Kola | Pain Navai Mahalleh | Pain Rostam | Pain Sang Rizeh | Pain Semes Kandeh | Pain Serest | Pain Seyyed Kola | Pain Shirud | Pain Zarrin Kola | Pain Zoghal Manzel | Paja | Pajat | Pajim | Palak-e Olya | Palak-e Sofla | Paland | Palang Azad | Palang Darreh | Palang Kola | Palangabad-e Olya | Palangeli | Palesk | Palham Dasht | Palham Koti | Palhamjan | Paltan | Panbeh Chuleh-ye Bala | Panbeh Chuleh-ye Pain | Panbeh Jar | Panbeh Zar Koti | Panjab | Panjak | Par Chinak | Par Kola | Par Kuh | Paran | Parch | Parchi Kola | Parchi Kola | Parchim Kesh | Parchin Poshteh | Parchur | Pardameh | Pardangun | Pardaram | Parem | Pari Kola | Pari Kola | Parimeh | Parminav Shamiun | Parsa | Parsi | Part-e Kola | Paru Mahalleh-ye Mangelab | Parvarijabad | Pas Kalayeh-ye Bozorg | Pas Peres | Pasand | Pasandeh-ye Olya | Pasha Kola | Pasha Kola | Pasha Kola | Pasha Kola | Pasha Kola | Pasha Kola | Pasha Kola | Pasha Kola | Pasha Kola | Pasha Kola-ye Afrakoti | Pasha Kola-ye Arbabi | Pasha Kola-ye Bish Mahalleh | Pasha Kola-ye Enteqali | Paski Mahalleh | Pat Rud Pey | Pazik Kheyl | Pazmin | Peleriyeh | Pelpa | Pepin | Peshert | Petrud | Pey Chalak | Pey Deh | Pey Kola | Pey Qaleh | Peyambur | Peymot | Pi Chelow | Piaz Kesh | Pichdeh | Pichdeh | Pija Kola | Pil | Pileh Kuh | Pink | Pink-e Asgarian | Pink-e Bala | Pir Naim | Pirajeh | Pish Sheshar | Pishanbur | Pishgun | Pishin Valeh | Pit Sara | Pit Sareh | Piteh Now | Pitka | Pol Gardan | Pol Sara | Pol-e Karat | Pol-e Mun | Pol-e Sefid | Pol-e Ushan | Pol-e Zoghal | Polt Darbon | Polt Kalleh | Polur | Pordeh Sar | Poschal | Posht Jub | Posht-e Gol | Pul Adasi | Pul | Pulad Kuh | Pulad Kuh Sar | Pulak Rud Pey | Puli Kiadeh | Purva | Pust Kola

=== Q ===
Qadi Kola | Qadi Kola | Qadi Kola | Qadi Kola | Qadi Kola-ye Arateh | Qadi Kola-ye Bozorg | Qadi Mahalleh | Qadi Mahalleh | Qadi Mahalleh | Qaem Shahr | Qaemiyeh | Qaemiyeh-ye Olya | Qaemiyeh-ye Sofla | Qajar Kheyl | Qajar Kheyl-e Khurandi | Qajar Mahalleh | Qajar Tappeh | Qala Koti | Qaleh Gardan | Qaleh Kesh | Qaleh Koti | Qaleh Sar | Qaleh Sar | Qaleh Sar-e Olya | Qaleh | Qaleh | Qaleh-ye Payan | Qalyan Kola | Qalzam Kola | Qanbarzadeh | Qandar Kheyl | Qara Kheyl | Qara Kola | Qarah Tappeh | Qaran Sara | Qasab-e Amir | Qasab-e Zalkan | Qasem Kheyl-e Arateh | Qasemabad | Qashoqtarash Mahalleh | Qassab Kola-ye Miandeh | Qassab Koti | Qomi Kola | Qoran Talar | Qoroq | Qoroq | Qurti Kola | Qushchi Mahalleh

=== R ===
Radar Station | Rafiabad | Rafy Bon | Ragan Dasht | Rah Kola | Rais Kola | Rais Kola | Rais Kola | Raisabad | Rajeh | Rajub | Ramadan Kheyl | Ramadan | Rameshi | Ramj Mahalleh | Ramnet | Ramsar | Ranga Poshteh | Rangraz Kola | Rangriz Kola | Rangriz Mahalleh | Rashidiyeh | Rashkola | Rashposhteh | Rashulangeh | Ravar | Raz Kenar | Razak | Razakeh | Razan | Razan | Razun | Rekabdar Kola | Rekaj | Rekun | Resket-e Olya | Resket-e Sofla | Reyhanabad | Reykandeh | Reza Kola | Reza Mahalleh | Rezaabad | Rig Cheshmeh | Rig Cheshmeh | Riku | Riku | Rineh | Rosbaram | Rostam Kola | Rostam Kola | Rostam Rud | Rostamdar Mahalleh | Rostamkola | Rowshan Kuh | Rowshanabad | Rowshandan | Royan | Rud Bar-e Firuz Ja | Rud Posht | Rudbar Dasht | Rudbar Kola | Rudbar Mahalleh | Rudbar Yakhkesh | Rudbar | Rudbarak | Rudbar-e Edru | Rudbar-e Kharkhun | Rudbar-e Naqib Deh | Rudbar-e Telma Darreh | Rudbari Konar | Rud-e Posht | Rudgar Mahalleh | Rudposht | Rukesh

=== S ===
Saadatabad | Sabeq Mahalleh | Sadat Mahalleh | Sadat Mahalleh | Sadat Mahalleh | Sadat Mahalleh | Sadat Mahalleh-ye Rudbast | Sadeh | Sadeqabad | Sadin Kola | Safal Mian | Safar Kheyl | Safarabad | Safarabad | Sahebi | Sahl Mehr Residential Complex | Said Kola | Saidabad | Saidabad | Sajadiyeh | Salah ol Din Kola | Salah ol Din Mahalleh | Salah | Salaj Anbar | Salamat Sara | Salar Mahalleh | Saldeh-e Olya | Saldeh-e Sofla | Salduz Kola-ye Bala | Salehabad | Salehabad | Salehan | Salehdar Kola | Salim Bahram | Salim Sheykh | Salimabad | Salimabad | Salman Shahr | Salu Kola | Salyakoti | Sama Gush Mahalleh | Sama | Sama | Samandak | Samchul | Samna Kola | San Kheyl | Sanam | Sanar-e Olya | Sanar-e Sofla | Sanateh | Saneh Kuh | Sang Bon | Sang Chal | Sang Chalak | Sang Cheshmeh | Sang Darka | Sang Darreh | Sang Deh | Sang Jar | Sang Koti | Sang Nisht | Sang Poshteh | Sang Rizeh | Sang Rud Pey | Sang Ruj | Sang Sara | Sang Sarag | Sang Sarak | Sang Sarlengeh | Sang Si | Sang Si-ye Do | Sang Tarashan | Sangar Deh | Sangar | Sangar | Sangchi | Sang-e Bast | Sang-e Koti | Sang-e Now | Sang-e Tajan | Sang-e Vares | Sangin Deh | Sangtab | Sangtab | Sangtu | Sangyab Sar | Sanur | Saqandin Kola | Sar Bud | Sar Chaleshk | Sar Cheshmeh | Sar Cheshmeh | Sar Hammam | Sar Hammam-e Abu ol Hasan | Sar Kaj | Sar Kam | Sar Kat | Saraj Mahalleh | Saraj Mahalleh | Saram | Saran | Sarasb | Sardab Rud | Sarfaqihabad | Sarhang Koti | Sari | Sarivdeh | Sarjah Kola | Sarka | Sarku Sara | Sarlanga | Sarlimak | Sarsareh | Sarta | Sartakarat | Sartangeh | Saru Kola | Saru | Sarun Kheyl | Sarun Mahalleh | Sarus | Sarv Kola | Sarvash Poshteh | Satereh | | Savadkuh | Sava Sareh | Savad Rudbar | Savatsi Aqalar | Savatsi Gol Chub | Savatsi Shiadeh | Savay | Sayij Mahalleh | Sefid Ab | Sefid Chah | Sefid Kuh | Sefid Tameshk | Sefid Tur-e Bala | Sefid Tur-e Pain | Sefiddar Goleh | Seh Kileh | Sehri | Selehdar Kola | Semes Kandeh-ye Olya | Senam | Sepah Mahalleh | Separ Deh | Seraj Kola | Seraj Mahalleh | Serin | Seyf Koti | Seyf Mahalleh | Seyyed Abu Saleh | Seyyed Ali-ye Kiasoltan | Seyyed Kalam Sar | Seyyed Khaneh Sar | Seyyed Kheyl | Seyyed Kola | Seyyed Kola | Seyyed Kola | Seyyed Kola | Seyyed Mahalleh | Seyyed Mahalleh | Seyyed Mahalleh | Seyyed Nezam ol Din | Seyyed Zeyn ol Abedin | Seyyedabad | Shab Khoskaj | Shab Kola | Shabakhusekul | Shaban Kheyl | Shad Mahal | Shad Mahalleh | Shad Mansur Mahalleh | Shadmorad Mahalleh | Shaghuz Kaleh | Shah Kola | Shah Kola-ye Said Kashi | Shah Najer | Shah Reza Gavzan Mahalleh | Shah Reza Mahalleh | Shah Zeyd | Shahab Lilam | Shahab ol Din | Shahan Dasht | Shahid Abdollah | Shahid Sara | Shahid Yunesi Bakhtun Kola Garrison | Shahidabad | Shahidabad | Shahneh Kola | Shahneh Kola | Shahneh Poshteh Hajji Mehdi | Shahr Kola | Shahr Rahim | Shahrak-e Dariashahr | Shahrak-e Darya Kenar | Shahrak-e Darya Sar | Shahrak-e Emam Khomeyni | Shahrak-e Eslamabad | Shahrak-e Farhangian | Shahrak-e Farzadshahr | Shahrak-e Janbazan | Shahrak-e Mostafa Khomeyni | Shahrak-e Namak Abrud | Shahrak-e Shahid Nowruzian | Shahrak-e Shahid Rejai | Shahrak-e Yasrab | Shahrara | Shahrband | Shahrbon | Shahr-e Koti | Shahr-e Posht | Shahrestan | Shahrestanak | Shahri | Shahriar Kandeh | Shahrud Kola | Shakarkuh | Shal Bakasht Vali | Shalikesh Amirqoli | Sham Jaran | Shami Kola | Shamiran | Shamsabad | Shamsabad | Shamshir Mahalleh | Shaneh Tarash | Shaneh Tarash Mahalleh | Shanehband | Shangoldeh | Sharafabad | Sharafdar Kola-ye Olya | Sharafdar Kola-ye Sofla | Sharafti | Shareh | Shariat Kola | Shariat Kola-ye Karim Kola | Shariatabad | Shariatabad | Sharifabad | Sharifabad | Sharm Kola | Sharmeh Kola | Sharqelet | Shasib Kola | Shasta | Shekta | Shel Darreh | Shelimak | Sherkat-e Neka Chub | Shesh Rudbar | Sheykh Ali Kola | Sheykh Ali Mahalleh | Sheykh Kola | Sheykh Koli | Sheykh Mahalleh | Sheykh Mahalleh | Sheykh Mahalleh | Sheykh Musa | Sheykh Rajeh | Sheykhabad | Shiadeh Sadat Mahalleh | Shiadeh-e Bala | Shib Ab Bandan | Shib Kalayeh | Shiler | Shir Dar Kola | Shir Darreh | Shir Khvar Kola | Shir Kola | Shir Kola | Shir Kola | Shir Mahalleh | Shir Savar | Shira | Shiraj Mahalleh-ye Bozorg | Shiraj Mahalleh-ye Kuchak | Shirdari | Shirejkhil | Shirgah | Shirin Bul | Shirjeh Kola | Shirkaj | Shirvan Mahalleh | Shishk | Shit | Shoja Mahalleh | Shokri Kola | Showb Mahalleh | Shub Kola | Shumia | Shur Ab Sar | Shur Ab | Shur Kesh | Shur Mast | Shur Mast-e Rudbar | Shurak | Shurek Chal | Shurestaq | Shurka | Si Bon | Si Pey | Siah Band | Siah Bisheh | Siah Chenar | Siah Darka | Siah Dasht-e Olya | Siah Dasht-e Sofla | Siah Kala Mahalleh | Siah Kola | Siah Kola | Siah Lash | Siah Rud | Siahrud Sar | Siar Kola | Siasan | Siavarz | Siavash Kola | Siavash Kola | Sibdeh | Sika | Simet | Sinava | Sinava Cheshmeh | Sir Bagh | Sirgah | Sirjarun | Sisara | Soleyman Kola | Soleyman Mahalleh | Soleyman Mahalleh | Soleymanabad | Solmel | Soltan Mohammad-e Taher | Soltanabad | Sorkh Geriveh | Sorkh Kola | Sorkh Kola | Sorkh Valik | Sorkhdasht | Sorkhrud | Sormoshk | Sova | Sowilam | Suchelma | Sud Kola | Sukhteh Kola | Sukhteh Sara | Sur Bon | Surak | Surak | Surak | Surat Kola | Surat | Surben | Suteh Kheyl | Suteh Kola | Suteh | Suteh | Suznak

=== T ===
Tabaqdeh | Tabarsu | Taeb Kola | Tahamtan Kola | Taher Deh | Taherabad | Tahrak Mahalleh | Taj ol Din Kola | Taj ol Din Mahalleh | Taj ol Dowleh-ye Muziraj | Tajan Lateh-ye Olya | Tajan Lateh-ye Sofla | Tajanak | Tajanak | Tajanak-e Olya | Tajanak-e Sofla | Tajanjar-e Olya | Tajanjar-e Sofla | Tajar Kheyl | Takam | Takar | Talaju | Talam | Talar Posht | Talar Posht-e Olya | Talar Posht-e Sofla | Talarak | Talaram | Talavak | Tale | Talebabad | Tale-e Rudbar | Taleh | Taleqani Mahalleh | Talesh Kheyl | Talesh Mahalleh | Talesh Mahalleh | Talesh Mahalleh-ye Fatuk | Talesh Sara | Talich Kuh | Taligaran | Talika | Tallar Sar-e Gharbi | Tallar Sar-e Sharqi | Talnar | Talu Bagh | Talu Kola | Talu Sar Mahalleh | Talu Sarak | Taluchal | Talvat | Tamar | Tamask | Tameshkol | Tamesk | Tamijanak | Tan Bela | Taneh Raz | Tang Darreh-ye Gharbi | Tang-e Dasht | Tang-e Lateh | Tanha Kola | Tanha Kola | Tappeh Sar | Tappeh | Taqiabad | Tara | Taraji Kola | Tari Kola | Tari Mahalleh | Tarkam | Tarmak | Tarsi Kola | Tarsiab | Tarsu va Sibarun | Tasbih Kola | Tashbandan | Tashkuh-e Olya | Tashkuh-e Sofla | Tashkuh-e Vosta | Tashun | Tatarestaq | Tavakkol-e Karim Kola | Tazeh Patak | Tazehabad Kola | Tazehabad | Tazehabad | Tazehabad | Tazehabad | Tazehabad | Tazehabad | Tazehabad | Tazehabad | Tazehabad | Tazehabad-e Bostan Kheyl | Tazehabad-e Jehad | Tazehabad-e Sepah | Tej Kenar | Tejen Kola-ye Olya | Tejen Kola-ye Sofla | Telaram | Teliran | Telma Darreh | Teraqechi Kola | Term | Tervijan | Tiar | Til Khani | Tila Kenar | Tilam | Tileh Bon | Tileh Now | Tilek | Tilpordehsar | Tilursar-e Sharqi | Tineh | Tir Jari | Tir Kan | Tir Kola | Tir Kola | Tir Kola | Tir Tash | Tirag Bon | Tirak Deh-e Olya | Tirak Deh-e Sofla | Tiran | Tirangsi | Tirkan | Toghan | Tomol | Tonekabon | Tork Kola | Tork Mahalleh | Tork Mahalleh | Torkaman Kheyl | Toshkun | Toska | Toskabon | Toskatok | Tovidarreh | Tovir | Tow Kalleh | Towqdar | Tubon | Tubon | Tudarak | Tuleh Kola | Tuleh Sara | Tur Bedar | Turan Kola | Tus Kola | Tusa Kalleh | Tusa Koti | Tuska

=== U ===
Urteh Dasht

=== V ===
Vachad | Vachak | Vachkalayeh | Vahed | Vaki Kola | Valadimeh | Valaghuz | Valam | Valamazu | Valamdeh | Valam-e Olya | Valamrud | Valashed | Valashed-e Pain | Valashid | Valashid | Valeh | Valet | Valg Sar | Valgam Lam | Vali Asr | Valiabad | Valiabad | Valiabad | Valiji Mahalleh | Valik | Valik Bon | Valik Chal | Valik Rudposht | Valik Takht | Valikan | Valik-e Olya | Valik-e Sofla | Valikestan | Valila | Valirkan | Valisdeh | Valsialam | Valu Kash | Valu Kola | Valuja | Valuyeh-ye Olya | Valuyeh-ye Sofla | Valvand | Vana | Vanajem | Vandarbon | Vaneh Kuh | Vaneshid | Vanush | Var Kola | Var Kola | Var Zamin | Varaki | Varamdeh | Varand | Varandan | Varazan | Varazdeh-e Olya | Varazdeh-e Sofla | Vared Mahalleh | Varfam | Vari | Varka Deh | Varmatun | Varmezabad | Varmi | Varnam-e Bala | Varnam-e Pain | Varpey | Vashkan | Vaskas | Vaskas | Vaspul | Vastan | Vasu Kola | Vasyeh Kash | Vatashan | Vatileh | Vav Darreh | Vavali Galleh | Vavali Gardan | Vavodin | Vazak | Vaz-e Olya | Vaz-e Sofla | Vaz-e Tangeh | Vazeyak | Vazivar | Vazmela | Velasht | Velesh Kola | Velu | Veresk | Vesiyeh Sar | Veysar | Vezvar | Viarsareh | Vishgun | Viva | Vosta Kola | Vosta Kola | Vuli Koti

=== Y ===
Yademan | Yagh Kuh | Yakh Kesh | Yakshub | Yal Rud | Yalbandan | Yalbandan-e Sara | Yamchi | Yan Dasht-e Bala | Yaneh Sar | Yaqub Lengeh | Yaqub Mahalleh | Yarasm | Yasel | Yazan | Yazdanabad | Yekeh Tut | Yuj | Yur Mahalleh | Yur Mahalleh | Yursiah-e Kola Mahalleh | Yusefabad | Yusefabad | Yusefabad | Yush

=== Z ===
Zafaran Kola | Zagh Marz | Zaghedeh | Zahed Kola | Zahed Kola | Zahed Kola | Zakaria Kola | Zakiabad | Zal Darreh | Zalam | Zamin Bon | Zanget-e Olya | Zanget-e Sofla | Zangi Kola | Zangi Kola-ye Olya | Zangi Kola-ye Sofla | Zangian | Zanus | Zar Khuni | Zarandin-e Olya | Zarandin-e Sofla | Zarbut | Zard Ab | Zard Kand | Zargar Bagh | Zargarmahalleh | Zari Mahalleh | Zarija | Zarivaran | Zarrin Kamar | Zarrin Kola | Zarrinabad-e Olya | Zarrinabad-e Sofla | Zaru Sara | Zaruj Mahalleh | Zarundeh | Zarvijan | Zavar Deh | Zavar Mahalleh | Zavar | Zavarak | Zavarak | Zavat-e Gharb | Zavat-e Sharq | Zazul | Zelet | Zerum | Zeyar | Zeyt-e Olya | Zeyt-e Sofla | Ziar Kola | Ziar Kola | Ziar Mahalleh | Ziarat Kola | Ziarat Sar | Ziarat Var | Ziarud | Zilet | Zinevand | Zirab | Zita Kola | Zoghal Chal
