= Lafurak =

Lafurak لفورك
- village
- Location within Iran
- Coordinates: 36°13′12″N 52°48′28″E
- Country: Iran
- Province: Mazandaran
- County: North Savadkuh
- Rural District: Lafur

Population (2006)
  - Total: 24
- Time zone: UTC+3:30 (IRST)

Lafurak (Persian: لفورك, also Romanized as Lafoūrak) is a village in Lafur Rural District, North Savadkuh County, Mazandaran Province, Iran. At the 2006 census, its population was 24, in 7 families.
