= Feyzollahabad =

Feyzollahabad فيض‌الله‌آباد
- Village
- Country: Iran
- Province: Mazandaran
- County: Babol
- Bakhsh: Babol Kenar
- Rural District: Babol Kenar

Population (2006)
  - Total: 45
- Time zone: UTC+3:30 (IRST)
  - Summer (DST): UTC+4:30 (IRDT)

Feyzollahabad (Persian: فيض‌الله‌آباد, also Romanized as Feyz̤ollahābād) is a village in Babol Kenar Rural District, Babol Kenar District, Babol County, Mazandaran Province, Iran. At the 2006 census, its population was 45, in 12 families.
