= Salah ol Din Mahalleh =

Salah ol Din Mahalleh صلاح الدين محله
- Village
- Location within Iran
- Coordinates: 36°37′20″N 53°05′12″E
- Country: Iran
- Province: Mazandaran
- County: Sari
- Bakhsh: Rudpey
- Rural District: Rudpey-ye Sharqi

Population (2016)
  - Total: 462
- Time zone: UTC+3:30 (IRST)

Salah ol Din Mahalleh (Persian: صلاح الدين محله, also Romanized as Şalāḩ ol Dīn Maḩalleh, Şalāḩ ed Dīn Maḩalleh, and Şalāḩ od Dīn Maḩalleh) is a village in Rudpey District of Sari County, Mazandaran Province, Iran. At the 2016 census, its population was 462, in 153 families. Up from 437 in 2006.
