= Khormakahn Shahrakhi =

Khormakahn Shahrakhi خرماكهن شاهرخي
- Village
- Country: Iran
- Province: Mazandaran
- County: Babol
- Bakhsh: Babol Kenar
- Rural District: Deraz Kola

Population (2006)
  - Total: 18
- Time zone: UTC+3:30 (IRST)
  - Summer (DST): UTC+4:30 (IRDT)

Khormakahn Shahrakhi (Persian: خرماكهن شاهرخي,) is a village in Deraz Kola Rural District, Babol Kenar District, Babol County, Mazandaran Province, Iran. At the 2006 census, its population was 18, in 4 families.
