= Seyyed Nezam ol Din =

Seyyed Nezam ol Din سيدنظام الدين
- Village
- Location within Iran
- Coordinates: 36°19′08″N 52°37′28″E
- Country: Iran
- Province: Mazandaran
- County: Babol
- Bakhsh: Bandpey-ye Sharqi
- Rural District: Sajjadrud

Population (2006)
  - Total: 1,033
- Time zone: UTC+3:30 (IRST)
  - Summer (DST): UTC+4:30 (IRDT)

Seyyed Nezam ol Din (Persian: سيدنظام الدين, also Romanized as Seyyed Nez̧ām ol Dīn, Seyyed Nez̧ām ed Dīn, and Seyyed Nez̧ām od Dīn) is a village in Sajjadrud Rural District, Bandpey-ye Sharqi District, Babol County, Mazandaran Province, Iran. At the 2006 census, its population was 1,033, in 267 families.
