= Nomudar Kola =

Nomudar Kola نموداركلا
- Village
- Location within Iran
- Coordinates: 36°33′29″N 52°32′52″E
- Country: Iran
- Province: Mazandaran
- County: Babol
- Bakhsh: Lalehabad
- Rural District: Karipey

Population (2006)
  - Total: 161
- Time zone: UTC+3:30 (IRST)
  - Summer (DST): UTC+4:30 (IRDT)

Nomudar Kola (Persian: نموداركلا, also Romanized as Nomūdār Kolā; also known as Nomūr Kolā) is a village in Karipey Rural District, Lalehabad District, Babol County, Mazandaran Province, Iran. At the 2006 census, its population was 161, in 39 families.
