= Yakshub =

Coordinates: 36°20′18″N 52°41′49″E

Yakshub يكشوب
- Village
- Interactive map of Yakshub
- Country: Iran
- Province: Mazandaran
- County: Babol
- Bakhsh: Babol Kenar
- Rural District: Deraz Kola

Population (2006)
  - Total: 87
- Time zone: UTC+3:30 (IRST)
  - Summer (DST): UTC+4:30 (IRDT)

Yakshub (Persian: يكشوب, also Romanized as Yakshūb) is a village in Deraz Kola Rural District, Babol Kenar District, Babol County, Mazandaran Province, Iran. At the 2006 census, its population was 87, in 21 families.
