= Anjil-e Si-ye Yek =

Anjil-e Si-ye Yek انجيل سي1
- Village
- Country: Iran
- Province: Mazandaran
- County: Babol
- Bakhsh: Bandpey-ye Sharqi
- Rural District: Sajjadrud

Population (2006)
  - Total: 32
- Time zone: UTC+3:30 (IRST)
  - Summer (DST): UTC+4:30 (IRDT)

Anjil-e Si-ye Yek (Persian: انجيل سي1, also Romanized as Ānjīl-e Sī-ye Yek) is a village in Sajjadrud Rural District, Bandpey-ye Sharqi District, Babol County, Mazandaran Province, Iran. At the 2006 census, its population was 32, in 6 families.
