= Babaabad =

negharchi mahaleh نقارچی محله
- Village
- Location within Iran
- Coordinates: 36°29′28″N 52°36′55″E
- Country: Iran
- Province: Mazandaran
- County: Babol
- Bakhsh: Central
- Rural District: Esbu Kola

Population (2006)
  - Total: 175
- Time zone: UTC+3:30 (IRST)
  - Summer (DST): UTC+4:30 (IRDT)

Negharchi mahalleh (Persian: نقارچی محله, also Romanized as Negharchi mahalleh) is a village in Esbu Kola Rural District, in the Central District of Babol County, Mazandaran Province, Iran. At the 2006 census, its population was 175, in 41 families.
