= Tarsu va Sibarun =

Tarsu va Sibarun ترسو و سيبرون
- Village
- Country: Iran
- Province: Mazandaran
- County: Babol
- Bakhsh: Bandpey-ye Sharqi
- Rural District: Firuzjah

Population (2006)
  - Total: 314
- Time zone: UTC+3:30 (IRST)
  - Summer (DST): UTC+4:30 (IRDT)

Tarsu va Sibarun (Persian: ترسو و سيبرون, also Romanized as Tarsū va Sībarūn) is a village in Firuzjah Rural District, Bandpey-ye Sharqi District, Babol County, Mazandaran Province, Iran. At the 2006 census, its population was 314, in 78 families.
