= Pink-e Asgarian =

Pink-e Asgarian پينك عسگريان
- Village
- Country: Iran
- Province: Mazandaran
- County: Babol
- Bakhsh: Bandpey-ye Sharqi
- Rural District: Sajjadrud

Population (2006)
  - Total: 38
- Time zone: UTC+3:30 (IRST)
  - Summer (DST): UTC+4:30 (IRDT)

Pink-e Asgarian (Persian: پينك عسگريان, also Romanized as Pīnk-e ʿAsgarīān) is a village in Sajjadrud Rural District, Bandpey-ye Sharqi District, Babol County, Mazandaran Province, Iran. At the 2006 census, its population was 38, in 9 families.
