= Dari Kandeh =

Dari Kandeh دری کنده
- Village
- Location within Iran
- Coordinates: 36°30′28″N 52°45′29″E
- Country: Iran
- Province: Mazandaran
- County: Babol
- Bakhsh: Central
- Rural District: Feyziyeh

Population (2016)
  - Total: 305
- Time zone: UTC+3:30 (IRST)

Dari Kandeh (Persian: دری کنده, also Romanized as Darī Kandeh) is a village in Feyziyeh Rural District, in the Central District of Babol County, Mazandaran Province, Iran.

At the time of the 2006 National Census, the village's population was 639 in 159 households. The following census in 2011 counted 558 people in 158 households. The 2016 census measured the population of the village as 305 people in 98 households.
