= Sang Rud Pey =

Sang Rud Pey سنگ رودپي
- Village
- Location within Iran
- Coordinates: 36°22′23″N 52°36′10″E
- Country: Iran
- Province: Mazandaran
- County: Babol
- Bakhsh: Bandpey-ye Gharbi
- Rural District: Khvosh Rud

Population (2006)
  - Total: 341
- Time zone: UTC+3:30 (IRST)
  - Summer (DST): UTC+4:30 (IRDT)

Sang Rud Pey (Persian: سنگ رودپي, also Romanized as Sang Rūd Pey) is a village in Khvosh Rud Rural District, Bandpey-ye Gharbi District, Babol County, Mazandaran Province, Iran. At the 2006 census, its population was 341, in 85 families.
