= Amir Deh =

Amir Deh اميرده
- Village
- Location within Iran
- Coordinates: 36°20′55″N 52°40′16″E
- Country: Iran
- Province: Mazandaran
- County: Babol
- Bakhsh: Bandpey-ye Sharqi
- Rural District: Sajjadrud

Population (2006)
  - Total: 200
- Time zone: UTC+3:30 (IRST)
  - Summer (DST): UTC+4:30 (IRDT)

Amir Deh (Persian: اميرده, also Romanized as Amīr Deh) is a village in Sajjadrud Rural District, Bandpey-ye Sharqi District, Babol County, Mazandaran Province, Iran. At the 2006 census, its population was 200, in 50 families.
