= Bez Cheft =

Bez Cheft بزچفت
- Village
- Location within Iran
- Coordinates: 36°23′00″N 52°45′00″E
- Country: Iran
- Province: Mazandaran
- County: Babol
- Bakhsh: Babol Kenar
- Rural District: Babol Kenar

Population (2006)
  - Total: 18
- Time zone: UTC+3:30 (IRST)
  - Summer (DST): UTC+4:30 (IRDT)

Bez Cheft (Persian: بزچفت) is a village in Babol Kenar Rural District, Babol Kenar District, Babol County, Mazandaran Province, Iran. At the 2006 census, its population was 18, in 7 families.
