= Ludasht =

Ludasht لودشت
- village
- Interactive map of Ludasht
- Coordinates: 36°14′42.8″N 52°46′44.1″E
- Country: Iran
- Province: Mazandaran
- County: North Savadkuh
- Rural District: Lafur

Population (2016)
  - Total: 127
- Time zone: UTC+3:30 (IRST)

Ludasht (Persian: لودشت, also Romanized as Lūdasht) is a village in Lafur Rural District, North Savadkuh County, Mazandaran Province, Iran. At the 2016 census, its population was 127, in 42 families. Increased from 61 in 2006.
