= Kuhpayeh Sara =

Kuhpayeh Sara كوهپايه سرا
- Village
- Location within Iran
- Coordinates: 36°18′28″N 52°37′45″E
- Country: Iran
- Province: Mazandaran
- County: Babol
- Bakhsh: Bandpey-ye Sharqi
- Rural District: Sajjadrud

Population (2006)
  - Total: 804
- Time zone: UTC+3:30 (IRST)
  - Summer (DST): UTC+4:30 (IRDT)

Kuhpayeh Sara (Persian: كوهپايه سرا, also Romanized as Kūhpāyeh Sarā; also known as Kūb Sarā) is a village in Sajjadrud Rural District, Bandpey-ye Sharqi District, Babol County, Mazandaran Province, Iran. At the 2006 census, its population was 804, in 187 families.
