= Lotfaliabad =

Lotfaliabad لطفعلی‌آباد
- Village
- Location within Iran
- Coordinates: 36°28′49″N 52°30′13″E
- Country: Iran
- Province: Mazandaran
- County: Babol
- Bakhsh: Lalehabad
- Rural District: Karipey

Population (2006)
  - Total: 48
- Time zone: UTC+3:30 (IRST)
  - Summer (DST): UTC+4:30 (IRDT)

Lotfaliabad (Persian: لطفعلی‌آباد, also Romanized as Loţf‘alīābād) is a village in Karipey Rural District, Lalehabad District, Babol County, Mazandaran Province, Iran. At the 2006 census, its population was 48, in 14 families.
