= Gashnian =

Gashnian گشنيان
- village
- Location within Iran
- Coordinates: 36°12′04″N 52°47′46″E
- Country: Iran
- Province: Mazandaran
- County: North Savadkuh
- Rural District: Lafur

Population (2016)
  - Total: 13
- Time zone: UTC+3:30 (IRST)

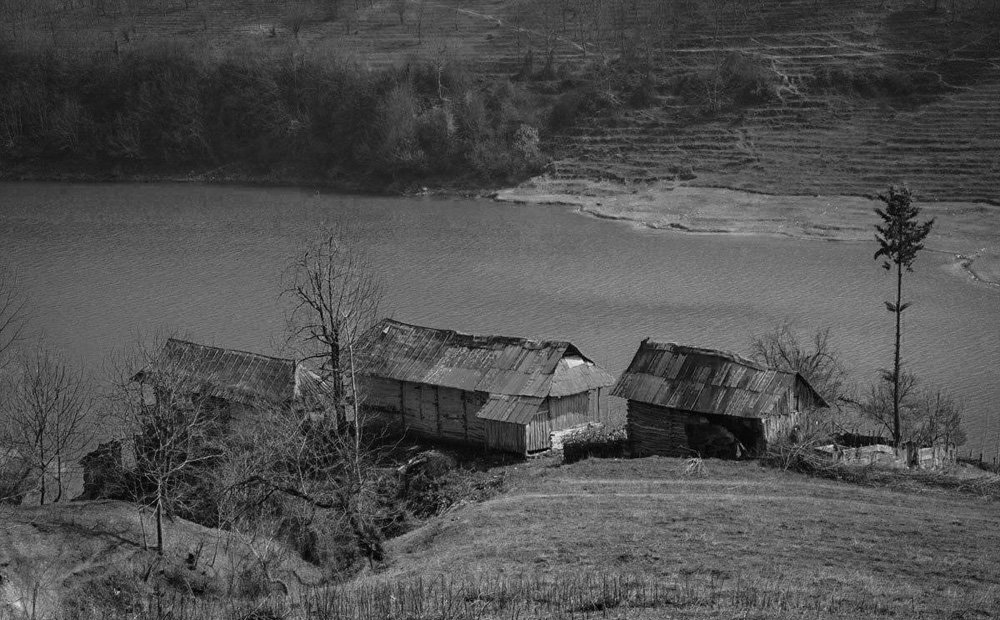
Gashnian

Gashnian (Persian: گشنيان, also Romanized as Gashnīān, Geshneyān, Geshnīān, and Geshnīyān) is a partly-abandoned village in Lafur Rural District, North Savadkuh County, Mazandaran Province, Iran. At the 2016 census, its population was 13, in 8 families. Large Decrease from 110 people in 2006.

Gashnian has been evacuated due to the construction of the Lafour Dam, and the main reason for this is the road connection being cut off. The rural houses here, which are subject to the climate of the Mazandaran region, have become ruins and abandoned today. When the weather becomes mild, only few residents return to the village to spend their weekends.
