= Emamzadeh Reza, Mazandaran =

Emamzadeh Reza امامزاده رضا
- Village
- Location within Iran
- Coordinates: 36°20′00″N 52°40′00″E
- Country: Iran
- Province: Mazandaran
- County: Babol
- Bakhsh: Bandpey-ye Sharqi
- Rural District: Sajjadrud

Population (2006)
  - Total: 220
- Time zone: UTC+3:30 (IRST)
  - Summer (DST): UTC+4:30 (IRDT)

Emamzadeh Reza (Persian: امامزاده رضا, also Romanized as Emāmzādeh Reẕā) is a village in Sajjadrud Rural District, Bandpey-ye Sharqi District, Babol County, Mazandaran Province, Iran. At the 2006 census, its population was 220, in 50 families.
