= Chaq-e Firuzjai =

Chaq-e Firuzjai چاق فيروزجائي
- Village
- Country: Iran
- Province: Mazandaran
- County: Babol
- Bakhsh: Bandpey-ye Gharbi
- Rural District: Khvosh Rud

Population (2006)
  - Total: 29
- Time zone: UTC+3:30 (IRST)
  - Summer (DST): UTC+4:30 (IRDT)

Chaq-e Firuzjai (Persian: چاق فيروزجائي, also Romanized as Chāq-e Fīrūzjā’ī) is a village in Khvosh Rud Rural District, Bandpey-ye Gharbi District, Babol County, Mazandaran province, Iran. At the 2006 census, its population was 29, in 8 families.
