= Shahneh Poshteh Hajji Mehdi =

Shahneh Poshteh Hajji Mehdi شهنه پشته حاجي مهد ئ
- Village
- Country: Iran
- Province: Mazandaran
- County: Babol
- Bakhsh: Bandpey-ye Gharbi
- Rural District: Khvosh Rud

Population (2006)
  - Total: 56
- Time zone: UTC+3:30 (IRST)
  - Summer (DST): UTC+4:30 (IRDT)

Shahneh Poshteh Hajji Mehdi (Persian: شهنه پشته حاجي مهد ئ, also Romanized as Shahneh Poshteh Ḩājjī Mehdi) is a village in Khvosh Rud Rural District, Bandpey-ye Gharbi District, Babol County, Mazandaran Province, Iran. At the 2006 census, its population was 56, in 15 families.
