= Owmal-e Estad Ahmad =

Owmal-e Ostad Ahmad اومال استاداحمد
- Village
- Location within Iran
- Coordinates: 36°27′06″N 52°53′31″E
- Country: Iran
- Province: Mazandaran
- County: Babol
- Bakhsh: Bandpey-ye Gharbi
- Rural District: Khvosh Rud

Population (2016)
  - Total: 44
- Time zone: UTC+3:30 (IRST)

Owmal-e Estad Ahmad (Persian: اومال استاداحمد, also Romanized as Owmāl-e Ostād Aḩmad; also known as Owmāl) is a village in Khvosh Rud Rural District, Bandpey-ye Gharbi District, Babol County, Mazandaran Province, Iran.

At the time of the 2006 National Census, the village's population was 41 in 11 households. The following census in 2011 counted 42 people in 12 households. The 2016 census measured the population of the village as 44 people in 14 households.
