= Mian Talar Hoseyni =

Mian Talar Hoseyni ميان طالارحسيني
- Village
- Country: Iran
- Province: Mazandaran
- County: Babol
- Bakhsh: Babol Kenar
- Rural District: Deraz Kola

Population (2006)
  - Total: 55
- Time zone: UTC+3:30 (IRST)
  - Summer (DST): UTC+4:30 (IRDT)

Mian Talar Hoseyni (Persian: ميان طالارحسيني, also Romanized as Mīān Ţālār Ḩoseynī) is a village in Deraz Kola Rural District, Babol Kenar District, Babol County, Mazandaran Province, Iran. At the 2006 census, its population was 55, in 12 families.
