= Namiun Anjil Si-ye Chahar =

Namiun Anjil Si-ye Chahar نميون انجيل سي4
- Village
- Country: Iran
- Province: Mazandaran
- County: Babol
- Bakhsh: Bandpey-ye Sharqi
- Rural District: Sajjadrud

Population (2006)
  - Total: 118
- Time zone: UTC+3:30 (IRST)
  - Summer (DST): UTC+4:30 (IRDT)

Namiun Anjil Si-ye Chahar (Persian: نميون انجيل سي4, also Romanized as Namīūn Ānjīl Sī-ye Chahār) is a village in Sajjadrud Rural District, Bandpey-ye Sharqi District, Babol County, Mazandaran Province, Iran. At the 2006 census, its population was 118, in 28 families.
