= Sarun Mahalleh =

Sarun Mahalleh سرون محله
- Village
- Location within Iran
- Coordinates: 36°30′01″N 52°33′42″E
- Country: Iran
- Province: Mazandaran
- County: Babol
- Bakhsh: Lalehabad
- Rural District: Karipey

Population (2006)
  - Total: 112
- Time zone: UTC+3:30 (IRST)
  - Summer (DST): UTC+4:30 (IRDT)

Sarun Mahalleh (Persian: سرون محله, also Romanized as Sarūn Maḩalleh) is a village in Karipey Rural District, Lalehabad District, Babol County, Mazandaran Province, Iran. At the 2006 census, its population was 112, in 32 families.
