= Kuhikheyl, Sari =

Kuhikheyl كوهی خيل
- Village
- Location within Iran
- Coordinates: 36°41′20″N 52°54′37″E
- Country: Iran
- Province: Mazandaran
- County: Sari
- Bakhsh: Rudpey
- Rural District: Rudpey-ye Sharqi

Population (2016)
  - Total: 380
- Time zone: UTC+3:30 (IRST)

Kuhikheyl (Persian: كوهی خيل, also Romanized as Kūhīkheyl) is a village in Rudpey-ye Sharqi Rural District, in the Rudpey District of Sari County, Mazandaran Province, Iran. At the 2016 census, its population was 380, in 127 families. Up from 205 people in 2006.
