= Rostam Kola, Babol =

Rostam Kola رستم كلا
- Village
- Location within Iran
- Coordinates: 36°21′01″N 52°39′20″E
- Country: Iran
- Province: Mazandaran
- County: Babol
- Bakhsh: Bandpey-ye Sharqi
- Rural District: Sajjadrud

Population (2006)
  - Total: 217
- Time zone: UTC+3:30 (IRST)
  - Summer (DST): UTC+4:30 (IRDT)

Rostam Kola (Persian: رستم كلا, also Romanized as Rostam Kolā) is a village in Sajjadrud Rural District, Bandpey-ye Sharqi District, Babol County, Mazandaran Province, Iran. At the 2006 census, its population was 217, in 58 families.
