= Owmal-e Shakrollah =

Owmal-e Shakrollah اومال شكراله
- Village
- Interactive map of Owmal-e Shakrollah
- Coordinates: 36.337°N 52.586°E
- Country: Iran
- Province: Mazandaran
- County: Babol
- Bakhsh: Bandpey-ye Gharbi
- Rural District: Khvosh Rud

Population (2016)
  - Total: 21
- Time zone: UTC+3:30 (IRST)

Owmal-e Shakrollah (Persian: اومال شكراله, also Romanized as Owmāl-e Shakrollah) is a village in Khvosh Rud Rural District, Bandpey-ye Gharbi District, Babol County, Mazandaran Province, Iran.

At the time of the 2006 National Census, the village's population was 23 in 5 households. The following census in 2011 counted 34 people in 10 households. The 2016 census measured the population of the village as 21 people in 6 households.
