= Rekaj =

Rekaj ركاج
- Village
- Location within Iran
- Coordinates: 36°25′18″N 52°30′34″E
- Country: Iran
- Province: Mazandaran
- County: Babol
- Bakhsh: Lalehabad
- Rural District: Lalehabad

Population (2006)
  - Total: 53
- Time zone: UTC+3:30 (IRST)
  - Summer (DST): UTC+4:30 (IRDT)

Rekaj (Persian: ركاج, also Romanized as Rekāj; also known as Rekāj Kolā) is a village in Lalehabad Rural District, Lalehabad District, Babol County, Mazandaran Province, Iran. At the 2006 census, its population was 53, in 13 families.
