= Marzy Koti Teyebi =

Marzy Koti Teyebi مرزئ كتي طيبي
- Village
- Country: Iran
- Province: Mazandaran
- County: Babol
- Bakhsh: Babol Kenar
- Rural District: Babol Kenar

Population (2006)
  - Total: 42
- Time zone: UTC+3:30 (IRST)
  - Summer (DST): UTC+4:30 (IRDT)

Marzy Koti Teyebi (Persian: مرزئ كتي طيبي, also Romanized as Marzy Kotī Ţeyebī) is a village in Babol Kenar Rural District, Babol Kenar District, Babol County, Mazandaran Province, Iran. At the 2006 census, its population was 42, in 11 families.
