= Shal Bakasht Vali =

Shal Bakasht Vali شال بكشت ولي
- Village
- Country: Iran
- Province: Mazandaran
- County: Babol
- Bakhsh: Babol Kenar
- Rural District: Deraz Kola

Population (2006)
  - Total: 16
- Time zone: UTC+3:30 (IRST)
  - Summer (DST): UTC+4:30 (IRDT)

Shal Bakasht Vali (Persian: شال بكشت ولي, also Romanized as Shāl Bakasht Valī) is a village in Deraz Kola Rural District, Babol Kenar District, Babol County, Mazandaran Province, Iran. At the 2006 census, its population was 16, in 5 families.
