= Sir Bagh =

Sir Bagh سيرباغ
- Village
- Location within Iran
- Coordinates: 36°12′52″N 52°39′19″E
- Country: Iran
- Province: Mazandaran
- County: Babol
- Bakhsh: Bandpey-ye Sharqi
- Rural District: Firuzjah

Population (2006)
  - Total: 20
- Time zone: UTC+3:30 (IRST)
  - Summer (DST): UTC+4:30 (IRDT)

Sir Bagh (Persian: سيرباغ, also Romanized as Sīr Bāgh; also known as Shīr Bāgh) is a village in Firuzjah Rural District, Bandpey-ye Sharqi District, Babol County, Mazandaran Province, Iran. At the 2006 census, its population was 20, in 5 families.
