= Mozaffar Kola =

Mozaffar Kola مظفركلا
- Village
- Location within Iran
- Coordinates: 36°27′13″N 52°30′19″E
- Country: Iran
- Province: Mazandaran
- County: Babol
- Bakhsh: Lalehabad
- Rural District: Lalehabad

Population (2006)
  - Total: 364
- Time zone: UTC+3:30 (IRST)
  - Summer (DST): UTC+4:30 (IRDT)

Mozaffar Kola (Persian: مظفركلا, also Romanized as Moz̧affar Kolā) is a village in Lalehabad Rural District, Lalehabad District, Babol County, Mazandaran Province, Iran. At the 2006 census, its population was 364, in 93 families.
