= Fereydun Kola =

Fereydun Kola فريدون كلا
- Village
- Country: Iran
- Province: Mazandaran
- County: Babol
- Bakhsh: Bandpey-ye Gharbi
- Rural District: Khvosh Rud

Population (2006)
  - Total: 65
- Time zone: UTC+3:30 (IRST)
  - Summer (DST): UTC+4:30 (IRDT)

Fereydun Kola (Persian: فريدون كلا, also Romanized as Fereydūn Kolā) is a village in Khvosh Rud Rural District, Bandpey-ye Gharbi District, Babol County, Mazandaran Province, Iran. At the 2006 census, its population was 65, in 16 families.
