= Dowlat Rud Bar =

Dowlat Rud Bar دولت رودبار
- Village
- Location within Iran
- Coordinates: 36°20′20″N 52°34′07″E
- Country: Iran
- Province: Mazandaran
- County: Babol
- Bakhsh: Bandpey-ye Gharbi
- Rural District: Khvosh Rud

Population (2006)
  - Total: 170
- Time zone: UTC+3:30 (IRST)
  - Summer (DST): UTC+4:30 (IRDT)

Dowlat Rud Bar (Persian: دولت رودبار, also Romanized as Dowlat Rūd Bār) is a village in Khvosh Rud Rural District, Bandpey-ye Gharbi District, Babol County, Mazandaran Province, Iran. At the 2006 census, its population was 170, in 48 families.
