= Shalikesh Amirqoli =

Shalikesh Amirqoli شاليكش اميرقلي
- Village
- Country: Iran
- Province: Mazandaran
- County: Babol
- Bakhsh: Bandpey-ye Sharqi
- Rural District: Sajjadrud

Population (2006)
  - Total: 103
- Time zone: UTC+3:30 (IRST)
  - Summer (DST): UTC+4:30 (IRDT)

Shalikesh Amirqoli (Persian: شاليكش اميرقلي, also Romanized as Shālīkesh Amīrqolī) is a village in Sajjadrud Rural District, Bandpey-ye Sharqi District, Babol County, Mazandaran Province, Iran. At the 2006 census, its population was 103, in 26 families.
