= Esfivashi =

Esfivashi اسفیواشی
- Village
- Location within Iran
- Coordinates: 36°37′17″N 53°04′46″E
- Country: Iran
- Province: Mazandaran
- County: Sari
- Bakhsh: Rudpey
- Rural District: Rudpey-ye Sharqi

Population (2006)
  - Total: 220
- Time zone: UTC+3:30 (IRST)

Esfivashi (Persian: اسفیواشی, also Romanized as Esfivāshī; also known as Esfūvāshī) is a village in Rudpey-ye Sharqi Rural District, in the Rudpey District of Sari County, Mazandaran Province, Iran. At the 2016 census, its population was 215, in 72 families. Down from 220 in 2006.
