= Marzi Darreh =

Marzi Darreh مرزيدره
- village
- Location within Iran
- Coordinates: 36°15′04″N 52°47′02″E
- Country: Iran
- Province: Mazandaran
- County: North Savadkuh
- Rural District: Lafur

Population (2016)
  - Total: 169
- Time zone: UTC+3:30 (IRST)

Marzi Darreh (Persian: مرزيدره, also romanized as Marzī Darreh; also known as Mīrzā Darreh) is a village in Lafur Rural District, North Savadkuh County, Mazandaran Province, Iran. At the 2016 census, its population was 169, in 59 families. Up from 120 people in 2006.
