= Kharkak =

Kharkak خركاك
- village
- Interactive map of Kharkak
- Coordinates: 36°13′17″N 52°42′37.6″E
- Country: Iran
- Province: Mazandaran
- County: North Savadkuh
- Rural District: Lafur

Population (2016)
  - Total: 174
- Time zone: UTC+3:30 (IRST)

Kharkak (Persian: خركاك, also Romanized as Kharkāk) is a village in Lafur Rural District, North Savadkuh County, Mazandaran Province, Iran. At the 2016 census, its population was 174, in 59 families. Increased from 102 people in 2006.
