= Davud Kola-ye Estaneh Sar =

Davud Kola-ye Estaneh Sar داودكلااستانه سر
- Village
- Location within Iran
- Coordinates: 36°27′11″N 52°29′32″E
- Country: Iran
- Province: Mazandaran
- County: Babol
- Bakhsh: Lalehabad
- Rural District: Lalehabad

Population (2006)
  - Total: 352
- Time zone: UTC+3:30 (IRST)
  - Summer (DST): UTC+4:30 (IRDT)

Davud Kola-ye Estaneh Sar (Persian: داودكلااستانه سر, also Romanized as Dāvūd Kolā-ye Estāneh Sar; also known as Dāvūd Kolā-ye Bālā) is a village in Lalehabad Rural District, Lalehabad District, Babol County, Mazandaran Province, Iran. At the 2006 census, its population was 352, in 94 families.
