= Faram Rudbar Hajji Sadeq =

Faram Rudbar Hajji Sadeq فرام رودبارحاجي صادق
- Village
- Country: Iran
- Province: Mazandaran
- County: Babol
- Bakhsh: Bandpey-ye Sharqi
- Rural District: Sajjadrud

Population (2006)
  - Total: 109
- Time zone: UTC+3:30 (IRST)

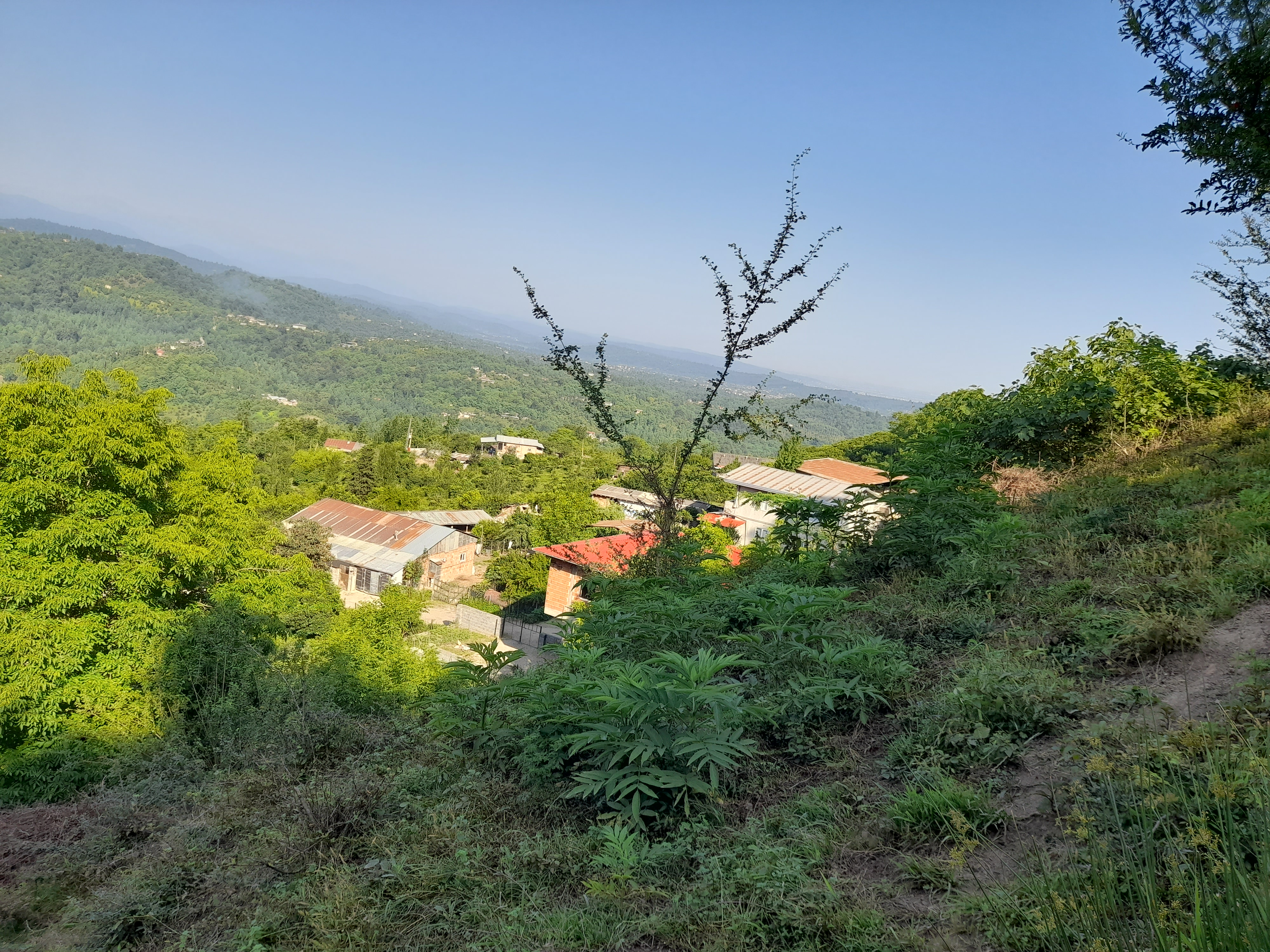
Faram Rudbar

Faram Rudbar Hajji Sadeq (Persian: فرام رودبارحاجي صادق, also Romanized as Farām Rūdbār Ḩājjī Şādeq) is a village in Sajjadrud Rural District, Bandpey-ye Sharqi District, Babol County, Mazandaran Province, Iran. At the 2006 census, its population was 79, in 28 families. Down from 109 people in 2006.
