= Alibak =

Alivak عالیواک
- Village
- Location within Iran
- Coordinates: 36°36′25″N 53°04′02″E
- Country: Iran
- Province: Mazandaran
- County: Sari
- Bakhsh: Rudpey
- Rural District: Rudpey-ye Sharqi

Population (2016)
  - Total: 303
- Time zone: UTC+3:30 (IRST)

Alivak (Persian: عالیواک, is a village in Rudpey-ye Sharqi Rural District, in the Rudpey District of Sari County, Mazandaran Province, Iran. At the 2016 census, its population was 303, in 59 families. Increased from 146 people in 2006.
