= Borji Kheyl-e Langur =

Borji Kheyl-e Langur برجی خيل لنگور
- Village
- Interactive map of Borji Kheyl-e Langur
- Coordinates: 36.619°N 52.7245°E
- Country: Iran
- Province: Mazandaran
- County: Babol
- Bakhsh: Central
- Rural District: Feyziyeh

Population (2016)
  - Total: 62
- Time zone: UTC+3:30 (IRST)

Borji Kheyl-e Langur (Persian: برجی خيل لنگور, also Romanized as Borjī Kheyl-e Langūr) is a village in Feyziyeh Rural District, in the Central District of Babol County, Mazandaran Province, Iran.

At the time of the 2006 National Census, the village's population was 72 in 20 households. The following census in 2011 counted 70 people in 25 households. The 2016 census measured the population of the village as 62 people in 22 households.
