= Zarivaran =

Zarivaran زريوران
- Village
- Location within Iran
- Coordinates: 36°21′55″N 52°39′08″E
- Country: Iran
- Province: Mazandaran
- County: Babol
- Bakhsh: Bandpey-ye Sharqi
- Rural District: Sajjadrud

Population (2006)
  - Total: 296
- Time zone: UTC+3:30 (IRST)
  - Summer (DST): UTC+4:30 (IRDT)

Zarivaran (Persian: زريوران, also Romanized as Zarīvarān; also known as Zarī Barān) is a village in Sajjadrud Rural District, Bandpey-ye Sharqi District, Babol County, Mazandaran Province, Iran. At the 2006 census, its population was 296, in 77 families.
