= Deh Kalan =

Deh Kalan دهكلان
- village
- Location within Iran
- Coordinates: 36°14′53″N 52°48′09″E
- Country: Iran
- Province: Mazandaran
- County: North Savadkuh
- Rural District: Lafur

Population (2016)
  - Total: 152
- Time zone: UTC+3:30 (IRST)

Deh Kalan (Persian: دهكلان, also Romanized as Deh Kalān; also known as Dīv Kalān) is a village in Lafur Rural District, North Savadkuh County, Mazandaran Province, Iran. At the 2016 census, its population was 152, in 70 families. Down from 210 people in 2006.
