= Kharabeh Khvoshrud Pey =

Kharabeh Khvoshrud Pey خرابه خوشرود پي
- Village
- Location within Iran
- Coordinates: 36°22′51″N 52°32′47″E
- Country: Iran
- Province: Mazandaran
- County: Babol
- Bakhsh: Bandpey-ye Gharbi
- Rural District: Khvosh Rud

Population (2006)
  - Total: 139
- Time zone: UTC+3:30 (IRST)
  - Summer (DST): UTC+4:30 (IRDT)

Kharabeh Khvoshrud Pey (Persian: خرابه خوشرود پي, also Romanized as Kharābeh Khvoshrūd Pey; also known as Khoshkrūd Pey) is a village in Khvosh Rud Rural District, Bandpey-ye Gharbi District, Babol County, Mazandaran Province, Iran. At the 2006 census, its population was 139, in 28 families.
