= Hamzeh Reza =

Hamzeh Reza حمزه رضا
- Village
- Location within Iran
- Coordinates: 36°26′00″N 52°33′00″E
- Country: Iran
- Province: Mazandaran
- County: Babol
- Bakhsh: Lalehabad
- Rural District: Lalehabad

Population (2006)
  - Total: 210
- Time zone: UTC+3:30 (IRST)
  - Summer (DST): UTC+4:30 (IRDT)

Hamzeh Reza (Persian: حمزه رضا, also Romanized as Ḩamzeh Reẕā) is a village in Lalehabad Rural District, Lalehabad District, Babol County, Mazandaran Province, Iran. At the 2006 census, its population was 210, in 56 families.
