= Lamsu Kola =

Lamsu Kola لمسوكلا
- Village
- Location within Iran
- Coordinates: 36°13′15″N 52°38′00″E
- Country: Iran
- Province: Mazandaran
- County: Babol
- Bakhsh: Bandpey-ye Sharqi
- Rural District: Firuzjah

Population (2006)
  - Total: 100
- Time zone: UTC+3:30 (IRST)
  - Summer (DST): UTC+4:30 (IRDT)

Lamsu Kola (Persian: لمسوكلا, also Romanized as Lamsū Kolā and Lamsū Kalā; also known as Samsū Kolā) is a village in Firuzjah Rural District, Bandpey-ye Sharqi District, Babol County, Mazandaran Province, Iran. At the 2006 census, its population was 100, in 28 families.
