= Bisheh Mahalleh =

Bisheh Mahalleh بيشه محله
- Village
- Location within Iran
- Coordinates: 36°31′15″N 52°28′58″E
- Country: Iran
- Province: Mazandaran
- County: Babol
- Bakhsh: Lalehabad
- Rural District: Karipey

Population (2006)
  - Total: 207
- Time zone: UTC+3:30 (IRST)
  - Summer (DST): UTC+4:30 (IRDT)

Bisheh Mahalleh (Persian: بيشه محله, also Romanized as Bīsheh Maḩalleh) is a village in Karipey Rural District, Lalehabad District, Babol County, Mazandaran Province, Iran. At the 2006 census, its population was 207, in 58 families.
