= Ney Kola =

Ney Kola ني كلا
- Village
- Location within Iran
- Coordinates: 36°36′40″N 52°43′13″E
- Country: Iran
- Province: Mazandaran
- County: Babol
- Bakhsh: Lalehabad
- Rural District: Karipey

Population (2006)
  - Total: 260
- Time zone: UTC+3:30 (IRST)
  - Summer (DST): UTC+4:30 (IRDT)

Ney Kola (Persian: ني كلا, also Romanised as Ney Kolā) is a village in Karipey Rural District, Lalehabad District, Babol County, Mazandaran Province, Iran. At the 2006 census, its population was 260, in 63 families.
