= Chak Sara =

Chak Sara چاكسرا
- village
- Location within Iran
- Coordinates: 36°12′15″N 52°50′25″E
- Country: Iran
- Province: Mazandaran
- County: North Savadkuh
- Rural District: Lafur

Population (2016)
  - Total: 16
- Time zone: UTC+3:30 (IRST)

Chak Sara (Persian: چاكسرا, also Romanized as Chāk Sarā; also known as Chak Safā and Chāk Sar) is a village in Lafur Rural District, North Savadkuh County, Mazandaran Province, Iran. At the 2016 census, its population was 16, in 10 families. Decreased from 34 people in 2006.
