= Akhmen =

Akhmen اخمن
- Village
- Location within Iran
- Coordinates: 36°21′00″N 52°41′00″E
- Country: Iran
- Province: Mazandaran
- County: Babol
- Bakhsh: Bandpey-ye Sharqi
- Rural District: Sajjadrud

Population (2006)
  - Total: 229
- Time zone: UTC+3:30 (IRST)
  - Summer (DST): UTC+4:30 (IRDT)

Akhmen (Persian: اخمن, also Romanized as Ākhmen) is a village in Sajjadrud Rural District, Bandpey-ye Sharqi District, Babol County, Mazandaran Province, Iran. At the 2006 census, its population was 229, in 52 families.
