= Ali Zamin =

Ali Zamin عالي زمين
- Village
- Location within Iran
- Coordinates: 36°27′08″N 52°35′30″E
- Country: Iran
- Province: Mazandaran
- County: Babol
- Bakhsh: Central
- Rural District: Esbu Kola

Population (2006)
  - Total: 497
- Time zone: UTC+3:30 (IRST)
  - Summer (DST): UTC+4:30 (IRDT)

Ali Zamin (Persian: عالي زمين, also Romanized as ‘Ālī Zamīn and ‘Alī Zamīn) is a village in Esbu Kola Rural District, in the Central District of Babol County, Mazandaran Province, Iran. At the 2006 census, its population was 497, in 118 families.
