= Kazem Beyki =

Kazem Beyki كاظم بيكي
- Village
- Location within Iran
- Coordinates: 36°26′49″N 52°30′49″E
- Country: Iran
- Province: Mazandaran
- County: Babol
- Bakhsh: Lalehabad
- Rural District: Lalehabad

Population (2006)
  - Total: 327
- Time zone: UTC+3:30 (IRST)
  - Summer (DST): UTC+4:30 (IRDT)

Kazem Beyki (Persian: كاظم بيكي, also Romanized as Kāz̧em Beykī; also known as Kāz̧em Bekī and Kāz̧em Beygī) is a village in Lalehabad Rural District, Lalehabad District, Babol County, Mazandaran Province, Iran. At the 2006 census, its population was 327, in 92 families.
