= Taj-ol Dowleh-ye Muziraj =

Taj-ol Dowleh-ye Muziraj تاج‌الدوله موزيرج
- Village
- Location within Iran
- Coordinates: 36°35′08″N 52°37′00″E
- Country: Iran
- Province: Mazandaran
- County: Babol
- Bakhsh: Lalehabad
- Rural District: Karipey

Population (2006)
  - Total: 134
- Time zone: UTC+3:30 (IRST)
  - Summer (DST): UTC+4:30 (IRDT)

Taj-ol-Dowleh-ye Muziraj (Persian: تاج‌الدوله موزيرج, also Romanized as Tāj-ol Dowleh-ye Mūzīraj; also known as Tāj-od Dowleh) is a village in Karipey Rural District, Lalehabad District, Babol County, Mazandaran Province, Iran. At the 2006 census, its population was 134, in 33 families.
