= Ojak, Mazandaran =

Ojak اجاك
- Village
- Location within Iran
- Coordinates: 36°23′53″N 52°42′25″E
- Country: Iran
- Province: Mazandaran
- County: Babol
- Bakhsh: Babol Kenar
- Rural District: Babol Kenar

Population (2006)
  - Total: 185
- Time zone: UTC+3:30 (IRST)
  - Summer (DST): UTC+4:30 (IRDT)

Ojak (Persian: اجاك, romanized: Ojāk) is a village in Babol Kenar Rural District, Babol Kenar District, Babol County, Mazandaran Province, Iran. At the 2006 census, its population was 185, in 46 families.
