= Arva Kheyl =

Arva Kheyl ارواخيل
- Village
- Location within Iran
- Coordinates: 36°38′26″N 53°04′43″E
- Country: Iran
- Province: Mazandaran
- County: Sari
- Bakhsh: Rudpey
- Rural District: Rudpey-ye Sharqi

Population (2006)
  - Total: 382
- Time zone: UTC+3:30 (IRST)

Arva Kheyl (Persian: ارواخيل, also Romanized as Arvā Kheyl) is a village in Rudpey-ye Sharqi Rural District, in the Rudpey District of Sari County, Mazandaran Province, Iran. At the 2006 census, its population was 372, in 127 families. Down from 382 in 2006.
