= Tari Mahalleh =

Tari Mahalleh تاري محله
- Village
- Location within Iran
- Coordinates: 36°28′37″N 52°30′42″E
- Country: Iran
- Province: Mazandaran
- County: Babol
- Bakhsh: Lalehabad
- Rural District: Karipey

Population (2006)
  - Total: 386
- Time zone: UTC+3:30 (IRST)
  - Summer (DST): UTC+4:30 (IRDT)

Tari Mahalleh (Persian: تاري محله, also Romanized as Tārī Maḩalleh; also known as Ţāherī Maḩalleh) is a village in Karipey Rural District, Lalehabad District, Babol County, Mazandaran Province, Iran. According to the 2016 census, its population was 452, in 115 families.
