= Nakh Kola =

Nakh Kola نخ كلا
- Village
- Location within Iran
- Coordinates: 36°31′46″N 52°45′49″E
- Country: Iran
- Province: Mazandaran
- County: Babol
- Bakhsh: Central
- Rural District: Feyziyeh

Population (2016)
  - Total: 75
- Time zone: UTC+3:30 (IRST)

Nakh Kola (Persian: نخ كلا, also Romanized as Nakh Kolā) is a village in Feyziyeh Rural District, in the Central District of Babol County, Mazandaran Province, Iran.

At the time of the 2006 National Census, the village's population was 98 in 27 households. The following census in 2011 counted 88 people in 26 households. The 2016 census measured the population of the village as 75 people in 25 households.
