= Deraz Kesh =

Coordinates: 36°16′26″N 52°39′39″E

Deraz Kesh درازكش
- Village
- Interactive map of Deraz Kesh
- Country: Iran
- Province: Mazandaran
- County: Babol
- Bakhsh: Bandpey-ye Sharqi
- Rural District: Sajjadrud

Population (2006)
  - Total: 281
- Time zone: UTC+3:30 (IRST)
  - Summer (DST): UTC+4:30 (IRDT)

Deraz Kesh (Persian: درازكش, also Romanized as Derāz Kesh) is a village in Sajjadrud Rural District, Bandpey-ye Sharqi District, Babol County, Mazandaran Province, Iran. At the 2006 census, its population was 281, in 77 families.
