= Shariat Kola-ye Karim Kola =

Shariat Kola-ye Karim Kola شريعت كلاكريم كلا
- Village
- Country: Iran
- Province: Mazandaran
- County: Babol
- Bakhsh: Lalehabad
- Rural District: Karipey

Population (2006)
  - Total: 382
- Time zone: UTC+3:30 (IRST)
  - Summer (DST): UTC+4:30 (IRDT)

Shariat Kola-ye Karim Kola (Persian: شريعت كلاكريم كلا, also Romanized as Sharī‘at Kolā-ye Karīm Kolā) is a village in Karipey Rural District, Lalehabad District, Babol County, Mazandaran Province, Iran. At the 2006 census, its population was 382, in 96 families.
