= Sang Si =

Sang Si سنگسي
- village
- Interactive map of Sang Si
- Coordinates: 36°12′15.5″N 52°42′16.3″E
- Country: Iran
- Province: Mazandaran
- County: North Savadkuh
- Rural District: Lafur

Population (2016)
  - Total: 63
- Time zone: UTC+3:30 (IRST)

Sang Si (Persian: سنگسي, also Romanized as Sang Sī) is a village in Lafur Rural District, North Savadkuh County, Mazandaran Province, Iran. At the 2016 census, its population was 63, in 23 families. Down from 77 in 2006.
