= Azarsi =

Azarsi (Persian: ازارسي) may refer to:

- Azarsi, Bandpey-ye Gharbi
- Azarsi, Bandpey-ye Sharqi
- Azarsi-ye Babal Konar
- Azarsi Hattem
- Azarsi-ye Hoseyn Khanzadeh
- Azarsi-ye Nematollah
- Azarsi-ye Sadollah
- Azarsi-ye Taskanu
