= Eslamabad, North Savadkuh =

Village in Mazandaran province, Iran

Eslamabad Persian: اسلام آباد
- Village
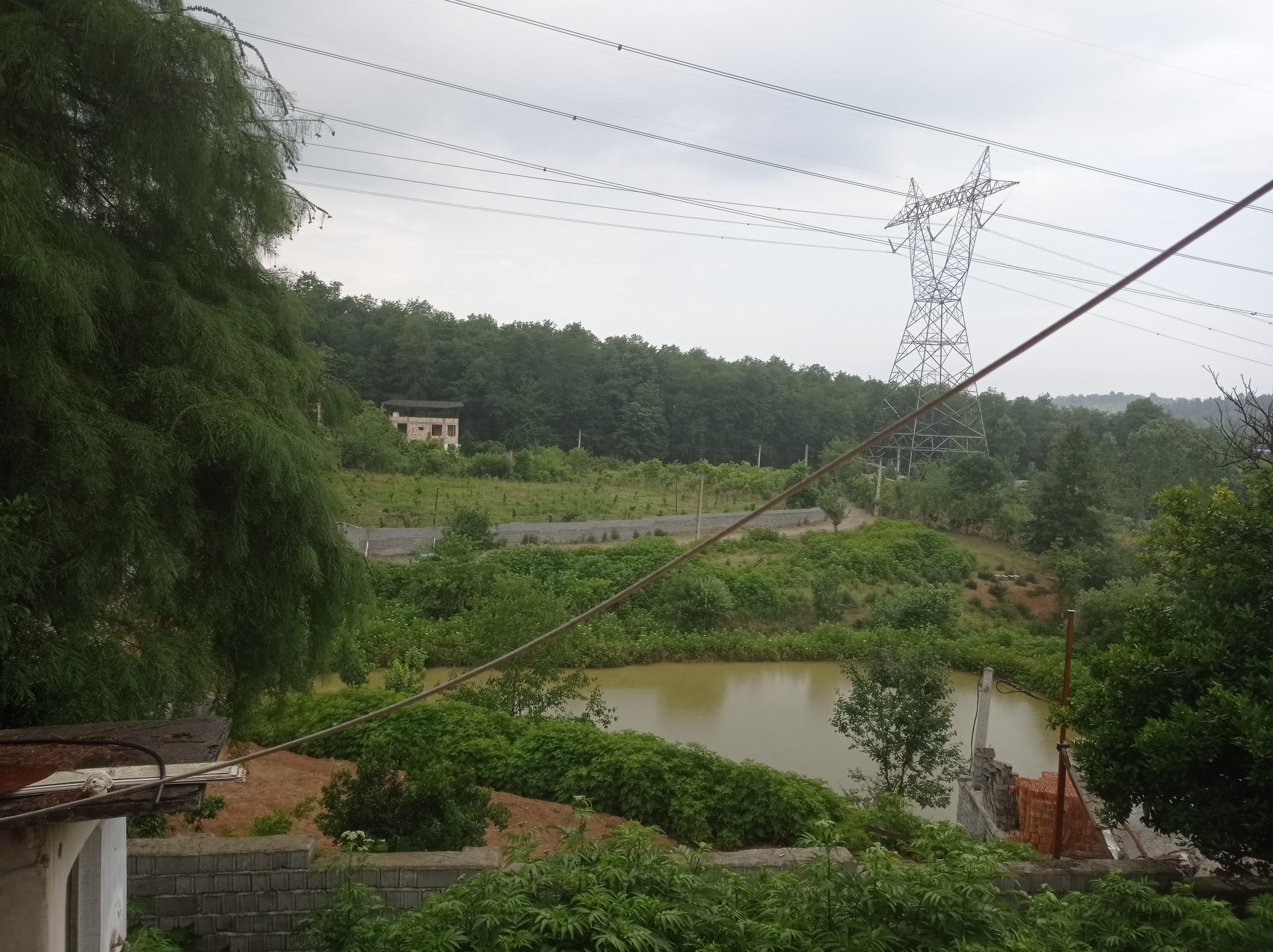
- The village of Eslamabad

- Location within Iran
- Coordinates: 36°18′55″N 52°49′24″E
- Country: Iran
- Province: Mazandaran
- County: North Savadkuh
- District: Central
- Rural District: Sharq va Gharb-e Shirgah

Population (2016)
  - Total: 138
- Time zone: UTC+3:30 (IRST)

Eslamabad (Persian: اسلام آباد) (Note: AAlso romanized as Eslāmābād; formerly known as Nahiyeh Sanati-ye Eslamabad (ناحيه صنعتي اسلام آباد), also romanized as Nāḩīyeh Şan‘atī-ye Eslāmābād, English: Islamabad Industrial Area) is a village in Sharq va Gharb-e Shirgah Rural District of the Central District in North Savadkuh County, Mazandaran province, Iran.

Eslamabad is on the road between Shirgah and Marzikola. The industrial zone is located west of the village. Nearby villages are Kalij Kheyl in the east and Gavan Kola, Babol Kenar in the west.

== Demographics ==
=== Population ===
At the time of the 2006 National Census, the village's population, as Nahiyeh Sanati-ye Eslamabad, was 62 in 17 households, when it was in the former Shirgah District of Savadkuh County. The following census in 2011 counted 83 people in 27 households. The 2016 census measured the population of the village as 138 people in 41 households, by which time the district had been separated from the county in the establishment of North Savadkuh County. The rural district was transferred to the new Central District and the village was listed as Eslamabad.
