= Andar Goli =

Neighborhood in Mazandaran province, Iran

Andar Goli Persian: اندارگلی
- Neighborhood
- Location within Iran
- Coordinates: 36°20′25″N 52°52′44″E
- Country: Iran
- Province: Mazandaran
- County: North Savadkuh
- District: Narenjestan
- Rural District: Chaybagh
- Village: Chaybagh

Population (2016)
  - Total: 795
- Time zone: UTC+3:30 (IRST)

Andar Goli (Persian: اندارگلی) (Note: Also romanized as Andār Golī) is a neighborhood in the village of Chaybagh in Chaybagh Rural District of Narenjestan District in North Savadkuh County, Mazandaran province, Iran.

== Demographics ==
=== Population ===
At the time of the 2006 National Census, Andar Goli's population was 616 in 171 households, when it was a village in Sharq va Gharb-e Shirgah Rural District of the former Shirgah District in Savadkuh County. The following census in 2011 counted 560 people in 180 households. The 2016 census measured the population of the village as 795 people in 249 households, by which time the district had been separated from the county in the establishment of North Savadkuh County. The rural district was transferred to the new Central District, and the village was transferred to Chaybagh Rural District created in the new Narenjestan District. Andar Goli had merged with the neighboring village of Chaybagh in 2013.
