= Bur Kheyl =

Village in Mazandaran province, Iran

Bur Kheyl Persian: بورخيل
- Village
- Location within Iran
- Coordinates: 36°22′11″N 52°49′36″E
- Country: Iran
- Province: Mazandaran
- County: North Savadkuh
- District: Narenjestan
- Rural District: Hatkeh

Population (2016)
  - Total: 725
- Time zone: UTC+3:30 (IRST)

Bur Kheyl (Persian: بورخيل) (Note: Also romanized as Būr Kheyl) is a village in, and the capital of, Hatkeh Rural District in Narenjestan District of North Savadkuh County, Mazandaran province, Iran.

== Demographics ==
=== Population ===
At the time of the 2006 National Census, the village's population was 803 in 230 households, when it was in Sharq va Gharb-e Shirgah Rural District of the former Shirgah District in Savadkuh County. The following census in 2011 counted 727 people in 235 households. The 2016 census measured the population of the village as 725 people in 264 households, by which time the district had been separated from the county in the establishment of North Savadkuh County. The rural district was transferred to the new Central District, and Bur Kheyl was transferred to Hatkeh Rural District created in the new Narenjestan District.
