= Ivek, Mazandaran =

Village in Mazandaran province, Iran

Ivek Persian: ایوک
- Village
- Location within Iran
- Coordinates: 36°22′36″N 52°49′51″E
- Country: Iran
- Province: Mazandaran
- County: North Savadkuh
- District: Narenjestan
- Rural District: Hatkeh

Population (2016)
  - Total: 1,048
- Time zone: UTC+3:30 (IRST)

Ivek (Persian: ایوک) (Note: Also romanized as Īvek; also known as Dīvek) is a village in Hatkeh Rural District of Narenjestan District in North Savadkuh County, Mazandaran province, Iran.

== Demographics ==
=== Population ===
At the time of the 2006 National Census, the village's population was 893 in 214 households, when it was in Sharq va Gharb-e Shirgah Rural District of the former Shirgah District in Savadkuh County. The following census in 2011 counted 981 people in 272 households. The 2016 census measured the population of the village as 1,048 people in 347 households, by which time the district had been separated from the county in the establishment of North Savadkuh County. The rural district was transferred to the new Central District, and Ivek was transferred to Hatkeh Rural District created in the new Narenjestan District. It was the most populous village in its rural district.
