= Hatkehlu =

Village in Mazandaran province, Iran

Hatkehlu Persian: هتكه لو
- Village
- Location within Iran
- Coordinates: 36°21′21″N 52°49′57″E
- Country: Iran
- Province: Mazandaran
- County: North Savadkuh
- District: Narenjestan
- Rural District: Hatkeh

Population (2016)
  - Total: 114
- Time zone: UTC+3:30 (IRST)

Hatkehlu (Persian: هتكه لو) (Note: Also romanized as Hatkehlū) is a village in Hatkeh Rural District of Narenjestan District in North Savadkuh County, Mazandaran province, Iran.

== Demographics ==
=== Population ===
At the time of the 2006 National Census, the village's population was 103 in 32 households, when it was in Sharq va Gharb-e Shirgah Rural District of the former Shirgah District in Savadkuh County. The following census in 2011 counted 83 people in 28 households. The 2016 census measured the population of the village as 114 people in 44 households, by which time the district had been separated from the county in the establishment of North Savadkuh County. The rural district was transferred to the new Central District, and Hatkehlu was transferred to Hatkeh Rural District created in the new Narenjestan District.
