= Faramarz Kola =

Village in Mazandaran province, Iran

Faramarz Kola Persian: فرامرزكلا
- Village
- Location within Iran
- Coordinates: 36°21′35″N 52°48′35″E
- Country: Iran
- Province: Mazandaran
- County: North Savadkuh
- District: Narenjestan
- Rural District: Hatkeh

Population (2016)
  - Total: 632
- Time zone: UTC+3:30 (IRST)

Faramarz Kola (Persian: فرامرزكلا) (Note: Also romanized as Farāmarz Kolā) is a village in Hatkeh Rural District of Narenjestan District in North Savadkuh County, Mazandaran province, Iran.

== Demographics ==
=== Population ===
At the time of the 2006 National Census, the village's population was 561 in 143 households, when it was in Sharq va Gharb-e Shirgah Rural District of the former Shirgah District in Savadkuh County. The following census in 2011 counted 545 people in 165 households. The 2016 census measured the population of the village as 632 people in 202 households, by which time the district had been separated from the county in the establishment of North Savadkuh County. The rural district was transferred to the new Central District, and Faramarz Kola was transferred to Hatkeh Rural District created in the new Narenjestan District.
