= Yagh Kuh =

Village in Mazandaran province, Iran

Yagh Kuh Persian: ياغكوه
- Village
- Location within Iran
- Coordinates: 36°22′34″N 52°53′54″E
- Country: Iran
- Province: Mazandaran
- County: North Savadkuh
- District: Narenjestan
- Rural District: Chaybagh

Population (2016)
  - Total: 156
- Time zone: UTC+3:30 (IRST)

Yagh Kuh (Persian: ياغكوه) (Note: Also romanized as Yāgh Kūh) is a village in Chaybagh Rural District of Narenjestan District in North Savadkuh County, Mazandaran province, Iran.

== Demographics ==
=== Population ===
At the time of the 2006 National Census, the village's population was 86 in 25 households, when it was in Sharq va Gharb-e Shirgah Rural District of the former Shirgah District in Savadkuh County. The following census in 2011 counted 97 people in 33 households. The 2016 census measured the population of the village as 156 people in 59 households, by which time the district had been separated from the county in the establishment of North Savadkuh County. The rural district was transferred to the new Central District, and Yagh Kuh was transferred to Chaybagh Rural District created in the new Narenjestan District.
