= Bazir Kola =

Village in Mazandaran province, Iran

Bazir Kola Persian: بازيركلا
- Village
- Location within Iran
- Coordinates: 36°21′49″N 52°49′21″E
- Country: Iran
- Province: Mazandaran
- County: North Savadkuh
- District: Narenjestan
- Rural District: Hatkeh

Population (2016)
  - Total: 125
- Time zone: UTC+3:30 (IRST)

Bazir Kola (Persian: بازيركلا) (Note: Also romanized as Bāzīr Kolā; also known as Bāzīār Kolā) is a village in Hatkeh Rural District of Narenjestan District in North Savadkuh County, Mazandaran province, Iran.

== Demographics ==
=== Population ===
At the time of the 2006 National Census, the village's population was 84 in 24 households, when it was in Sharq va Gharb-e Shirgah Rural District of the former Shirgah District in Savadkuh County. The following census in 2011 counted 129 people in 45 households. The 2016 census measured the population of the village as 125 people in 49 households, by which time the district had been separated from the county in the establishment of North Savadkuh County. The rural district was transferred to the new Central District, and Bazir Kola was transferred to Hatkeh Rural District created in the new Narenjestan District.
