= Rezaabad, Mazandaran =

Village in Mazandaran province, Iran

Rezaabad Persian: رضااباد
- Village
- Location within Iran
- Coordinates: 36°21′10″N 52°51′39″E
- Country: Iran
- Province: Mazandaran
- County: North Savadkuh
- District: Narenjestan
- Rural District: Chaybagh

Population (2016)
  - Total: 44
- Time zone: UTC+3:30 (IRST)

Rezaabad (Persian: رضااباد) (Note: Also romanized as Rez̤āābād) is a village in Chaybagh Rural District of Narenjestan District in North Savadkuh County, Mazandaran province, Iran.

== Demographics ==
=== Population ===
At the time of the 2006 National Census, the village's population was 75 in 20 households, when it was in Sharq va Gharb-e Shirgah Rural District of the former Shirgah District in Savadkuh County. The following census in 2011 counted 45 people in 15 households. The 2016 census measured the population of the village as 44 people in 18 households, by which time the district had been separated from the county in the establishment of North Savadkuh County. The rural district was transferred to the new Central District, and Rezaabad was transferred to Chaybagh Rural District created in the new Narenjestan District.
