= Koti Lateh =

Village in Mazandaran province, Iran

Koti Lateh Persian: كتي لته
- Village
- Location within Iran
- Coordinates: 36°21′24″N 52°50′30″E
- Country: Iran
- Province: Mazandaran
- County: North Savadkuh
- District: Narenjestan
- Rural District: Hatkeh

Population (2016)
  - Total: 445
- Time zone: UTC+3:30 (IRST)

Koti Lateh (Persian: كتي لته) (Note: Also romanized as Kotī Lateh; also known as Kotī Latak) is a village in Hatkeh Rural District of Narenjestan District in North Savadkuh County, Mazandaran province, Iran.

== Demographics ==
=== Population ===
At the time of the 2006 National Census, the village's population was 440 in 128 households, when it was in Sharq va Gharb-e Shirgah Rural District of the former Shirgah District in Savadkuh County. The following census in 2011 counted 392 people in 130 households. The 2016 census measured the population of the village as 445 people in 157 households, by which time the district had been separated from the county in the establishment of North Savadkuh County. The rural district was transferred to the new Central District, and Koti Lateh was transferred to Hatkeh Rural District created in the new Narenjestan District.
