= Beshel =

Village in Mazandaran province, Iran

Beshel Persian: بشل
- Village
- Location within Iran
- Coordinates: 36°21′32″N 52°52′27″E
- Country: Iran
- Province: Mazandaran
- County: North Savadkuh
- District: Narenjestan
- Rural District: Chaybagh

Population (2016)
  - Total: 694
- Time zone: UTC+3:30 (IRST)

Beshel (Persian: بشل) (Note: Also known as Besh) is a village in Chaybagh Rural District of Narenjestan District in North Savadkuh County, Mazandaran province, Iran.

== Demographics ==
=== Population ===
At the time of the 2006 National Census, the village's population was 567 in 150 households, when it was in Sharq va Gharb-e Shirgah Rural District of the former Shirgah District in Savadkuh County. The following census in 2011 counted 985 people in 309 households. The 2016 census measured the population of the village as 694 people in 236 households, by which time the district had been separated from the county in the establishment of North Savadkuh County. The rural district was transferred to the new Central District, and Beshel was transferred to Chaybagh Rural District created in the new Narenjestan District.
