= Berenjestanak =

Village in Mazandaran province, Iran

Berenjestanak Persian: برنجستانك
- Village
- Location within Iran
- Coordinates: 36°22′25″N 52°55′11″E
- Country: Iran
- Province: Mazandaran
- County: North Savadkuh
- District: Narenjestan
- Rural District: Chaybagh

Population (2016)
  - Total: 273
- Time zone: UTC+3:30 (IRST)

Berenjestanak (Persian: برنجستانك) (Note: Also romanized as Berenjestānak; also known as Barenjestānak-e Bālā and Berenjestānak-e Pā’īn) is a village in Chaybagh Rural District of Narenjestan District in North Savadkuh County, Mazandaran province, Iran.

== Demographics ==
=== Population ===
At the time of the 2006 National Census, the village's population was 281 in 85 households, when it was in Sharq va Gharb-e Shirgah Rural District of the former Shirgah District in Savadkuh County. The following census in 2011 counted 211 people in 70 households. The 2016 census measured the population of the village as 273 people in 89 households, by which time the district had been separated from the county in the establishment of North Savadkuh County. The rural district was transferred to the new Central District, and Berenjestanak was transferred to Chaybagh Rural District created in the new Narenjestan District.
