= Mangol, Mazandaran =

Village in Mazandaran province, Iran

Mangol Persian: منگل
- Village
- Location within Iran
- Coordinates: 36°22′49″N 52°50′42″E
- Country: Iran
- Province: Mazandaran
- County: North Savadkuh
- District: Narenjestan
- Rural District: Hatkeh

Population (2016)
  - Total: 278
- Time zone: UTC+3:30 (IRST)

Mangol (Persian: منگل) is a village in Hatkeh Rural District of Narenjestan District in North Savadkuh County, Mazandaran province, Iran.

== Demographics ==
=== Population ===
At the time of the 2006 National Census, the village's population was 215 in 63 households, when it was in Sharq va Gharb-e Shirgah Rural District of the former Shirgah District in Savadkuh County. The following census in 2011 counted 190 people in 63 households. The 2016 census measured the population of the village as 278 people in 91 households, by which time the district had been separated from the county in the establishment of North Savadkuh County. The rural district was transferred to the new Central District, and Mangol was transferred to Hatkeh Rural District created in the new Narenjestan District.
