= Chaybagh =

Village in Mazandaran province, Iran

Chaybagh Persian: چایباغ
- Village
- Location within Iran
- Coordinates: 36°20′29″N 52°52′16″E
- Country: Iran
- Province: Mazandaran
- County: North Savadkuh
- District: Narenjestan
- Rural District: Chaybagh

Population (2016)
  - Total: 870
- Time zone: UTC+3:30 (IRST)

Chaybagh (Persian: چایباغ) (Note: Formerly Malafeh (ملفه), also romanized as Molfeh; also known as Chohesan) is a village in Chaybagh Rural District of Narenjestan District in North Savadkuh County, Mazandaran province, Iran, serving as capital of both the district and the rural district.

== Demographics ==
=== Population ===
At the time of the 2006 National Census, the village's population, as Malafeh, was 936 in 264 households, when it was in Sharq va Gharb-e Shirgah Rural District of the former Shirgah District in Savadkuh County. The following census in 2011 counted 855 people in 269 households. The 2016 census measured the population of the village as 870 people in 292 households, by which time the district had been separated from the county in the establishment of North Savadkuh County. The rural district was transferred to the new Central District, and Malafeh was transferred to Chaybagh Rural District created in the new Narenjestan District. The village was listed as Chaybagh after having merged with the village of Andar Goli, and was the most populous in its rural district.
