= Shirjeh Kola =

Village in Mazandaran province, Iran

Shirjeh Kola Persian: شيرجه كلا
- Village
- Location within Iran
- Coordinates: 36°18′44″N 52°51′47″E
- Country: Iran
- Province: Mazandaran
- County: North Savadkuh
- District: Central
- Rural District: Sharq va Gharb-e Shirgah

Population (2016)
  - Total: 385
- Time zone: UTC+3:30 (IRST)

Shirjeh Kola (Persian: شيرجه كلا) (Note: Also romanized as Shīrjeh Kolā) is a village in Sharq va Gharb-e Shirgah Rural District of the Central District in North Savadkuh County, Mazandaran province, Iran.

== Demographics ==
=== Population ===
At the time of the 2006 National Census, the village's population was 399 in 95 households, when it was in the former Shirgah District of Savadkuh County. The following census in 2011 counted 281 people in 82 households. The 2016 census measured the population of the village as 385 people in 126 households, by which time the district had been separated from the county in the establishment of North Savadkuh County. The rural district was transferred to the new Central District.
