= Owbon =

Owbon اوبن
- Village
- Interactive map of Owbon
- Coordinates: 36°12′57.7″N 52°43′6.9″E
- Country: Iran
- Province: Mazandaran
- County: Savadkuh
- Bakhsh: Shirgah
- Rural District: Lafur

Population (2016)
  - Total: 197
- Time zone: UTC+3:30 (IRST)

Owbon (Persian: اوبن) is a village in Lafur Rural District, North Savadkuh County, Mazandaran Province, Iran. At the 2016 census, its population was 197, in 59 families.
