= Alem Kola =

Village in Mazandaran province, Iran

Alem Kola Persian: عالمكلا
- Village
- Location within Iran
- Coordinates: 36°14′15″N 52°46′26″E
- Country: Iran
- Province: Mazandaran
- County: North Savadkuh
- District: Central
- Rural District: Lafur

Population (2016)
  - Total: 454
- Time zone: UTC+3:30 (IRST)

Alem Kola (Persian: عالمكلا) (Note: Also romanized as ‘Ālam Kalā, ‘Alam Kolā, ‘Ālem Kalā, and ‘Ālem Kolā) is a village in Lafur Rural District of the Central District in North Savadkuh County, Mazandaran province, Iran.

== Demographics ==
=== Population ===
At the time of the 2006 National Census, the village's population was 503 in 155 households, when it was in the former Shirgah District of Savadkuh County. The following census in 2011 counted 515 people in 181 households. The 2016 census measured the population of the village as 454 people in 183 households, by which time the district had been separated from the county in the establishment of North Savadkuh County. The rural district was transferred to the new Central District.
