= Emam Kola =

Village in Mazandaran province, Iran

Emam Kola Persian: امام كلا
- Village
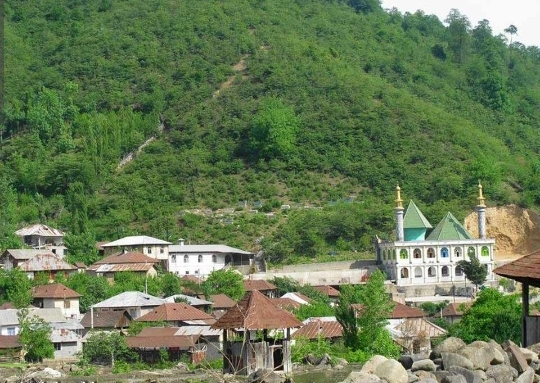
- The village of Emam Kola

- Location within Iran
- Coordinates: 36°11′30″N 52°41′57″E
- Country: Iran
- Province: Mazandaran
- County: North Savadkuh
- District: Central
- Rural District: Lafur

Population (2016)
  - Total: 283
- Time zone: UTC+3:30 (IRST)

Emam Kola (Persian: امام كلا) (Note: Also romanized as Emām Kolā; formerly known as Shah Kola, also romanized as Shāh Kolā) is a village in Lafur Rural District of the Central District in North Savadkuh County, Mazandaran province, Iran.

== Demographics ==
=== Population ===
At the time of the 2006 National Census, the village's population was 287 in 70 households, when it was in the former Shirgah District of Savadkuh County. The following census in 2011 counted 347 people in 110 households. The 2016 census measured the population of the village as 283 people in 99 households, by which time the district had been separated from the county in the establishment of North Savadkuh County. The rural district was transferred to the new Central District.
