= Naft Chal, North Savadkuh =

Village in Mazandaran province, Iran

Naft Chal Persian: نفت چال
- Village
- Location within Iran
- Coordinates: 36°13′55″N 52°49′07″E
- Country: Iran
- Province: Mazandaran
- County: North Savadkuh
- District: Central
- Rural District: Lafur

Population (2016)
  - Total: 236
- Time zone: UTC+3:30 (IRST)

Naft Chal (Persian: نفت چال) (Note: Also romanized as Naft Chāl) is a village in Lafur Rural District of the Central District in North Savadkuh County, Mazandaran province, Iran.

== Demographics ==
=== Population ===
At the time of the 2006 National Census, the village's population was 340 in 114 households, when it was in the former Shirgah District of Savadkuh County. The following census in 2011 counted 272 people in 92 households. The 2016 census measured the population of the village as 236 people in 101 households, by which time the district had been separated from the county in the establishment of North Savadkuh County. The rural district was transferred to the new Central District.
