= Bur Khani =

Village in Mazandaran province, Iran

Bur Khani Persian: بورخاني
- Village
- Location within Iran
- Coordinates: 36°14′05″N 52°50′07″E
- Country: Iran
- Province: Mazandaran
- County: North Savadkuh
- District: Central
- Rural District: Lafur

Population (2016)
  - Total: 378
- Time zone: UTC+3:30 (IRST)

Bur Khani (Persian: بورخاني) (Note: Also romanized as Būr Khānī) is a village in Lafur Rural District of the Central District in North Savadkuh County, Mazandaran province, Iran.

== Demographics ==
=== Population ===
At the time of the 2006 National Census, the village's population was 322 in 111 households, when it was in the former Shirgah District of Savadkuh County. The following census in 2011 counted 313 people in 116 households. The 2016 census measured the population of the village as 378 people in 136 households, by which time the district had been separated from the county in the establishment of North Savadkuh County. The rural district was transferred to the new Central District.
