= Sharqelet =

Village in Mazandaran province, Iran

Sharqelet Persian: شارقلت
- Village
- Location within Iran
- Coordinates: 36°15′31″N 52°47′30″E
- Country: Iran
- Province: Mazandaran
- County: North Savadkuh
- District: Central
- Rural District: Lafur

Population (2016)
  - Total: 179
- Time zone: UTC+3:30 (IRST)

Sharqelet (Persian: شارقلت) (Note: Also romanized as Shārqelet) is a village in, and the capital of, Lafur Rural District in the Central District of North Savadkuh County, Mazandaran province, Iran.

== Demographics ==
=== Population ===
At the time of the 2006 National Census, the village's population was 136 in 38 households, when it was in the former Shirgah District of Savadkuh County. The following census in 2011 counted 201 people in 61 households. The 2016 census measured the population of the village as 179 people in 60 households, by which time the district had been separated from the county in the establishment of North Savadkuh County. The rural district was transferred to the new Central District.
