= Mangol =

Mangol (Persian: منگل) may refer to:

- Mangol, Bushehr
- Mangol, Mazandaran
- Mangol, West Azerbaijan
