= Ahangar Kola, North Savadkuh =

Village in Mazandaran province, Iran

Ahangar Kola Persian: آهنگر كلا
- Village
- Location within Iran
- Coordinates: 36°20′07″N 52°50′55″E
- Country: Iran
- Province: Mazandaran
- County: North Savadkuh
- District: Central
- Rural District: Sharq va Gharb-e Shirgah

Population (2016)
  - Total: 581
- Time zone: UTC+3:30 (IRST)

Ahangar Kola (Persian: آهنگركلا) (Note: Also romanized as Āhangar Kalā and Āhangar Kolā) is a village in Sharq va Gharb-e Shirgah Rural District of the Central District in North Savadkuh County, Mazandaran province, Iran.

== Demographics ==
=== Population ===
At the time of the 2006 National Census, the village's population was 529 in 153 households, when it was in the former Shirgah District of Savadkuh County. The following census in 2011 counted 576 people in 177 households. The 2016 census measured the population of the village as 581 people in 202 households, by which time the district had been separated from the county in the establishment of North Savadkuh County. The rural district was transferred to the new Central District.
