= Galesh Kola, North Savadkuh =

Village in Mazandaran province, Iran

Galesh Kola Persian: گالش كلا
- Village
- Location within Iran
- Coordinates: 36°12′35″N 52°46′11″E
- Country: Iran
- Province: Mazandaran
- County: North Savadkuh
- District: Central
- Rural District: Lafur

Population (2016)
  - Total: 334
- Time zone: UTC+3:30 (IRST)

Galesh Kola (Persian: گالش كلا) (Note: Also romanized as Gālesh Kolā) is a village in Lafur Rural District of the Central District in North Savadkuh County, Mazandaran province, Iran.

== Demographics ==
=== Population ===
At the time of the 2006 National Census, the village's population was 346 in 124 households, when it was in the former Shirgah District of Savadkuh County. The following census in 2011 counted 214 people in 104 households. The 2016 census measured the population of the village as 334 people in 135 households, by which time the district had been separated from the county in the establishment of North Savadkuh County. The rural district was transferred to the new Central District.
