= Nowabad, North Savadkuh =

Village in Mazandaran province, Iran

Nowabad Persian: نواباد
- Village
- Location within Iran
- Coordinates: 36°20′57″N 52°50′22″E
- Country: Iran
- Province: Mazandaran
- County: North Savadkuh
- District: Central
- Rural District: Sharq va Gharb-e Shirgah

Population (2016)
  - Total: 193
- Time zone: UTC+3:30 (IRST)

Nowabad (Persian: نواباد) (Note: Also romanized as Nowābād) is a village in Sharq va Gharb-e Shirgah Rural District of the Central District in North Savadkuh County, Mazandaran province, Iran.

== Demographics ==
=== Population ===
At the time of the 2006 National Census, the village's population was 85 in 24 households, when it was in the former Shirgah District of Savadkuh County. The following census in 2011 counted 145 people in 59 households. The 2016 census measured the population of the village as 193 people in 69 households, by which time the district had been separated from the county in the establishment of North Savadkuh County. The rural district was transferred to the new Central District.
