= Afrasi =

Afrasi (Persian: افراسي) may refer to:

- Afrasi, Babol
- Afrasi, Savadkuh
