= Chali, Mazandaran =

Village in Mazandaran province, Iran

Chali Persian: چالی
- Village
- Location within Iran
- Coordinates: 36°19′06″N 52°53′08″E
- Country: Iran
- Province: Mazandaran
- County: North Savadkuh
- District: Central
- Rural District: Sharq va Gharb-e Shirgah

Population (2016)
  - Total: 924
- Time zone: UTC+3:30 (IRST)

Chali (Persian: چالی) (Note: Also romanized as Chālī) is a village in Sharq va Gharb-e Shirgah Rural District of the Central District in North Savadkuh County, Mazandaran province, Iran.

== Demographics ==
=== Population ===
At the time of the 2006 National Census, the village's population was 915 in 245 households, when it was in the former Shirgah District of Savadkuh County. The following census in 2011 counted 909 people in 273 households. The 2016 census measured the population of the village as 924 people in 298 households, by which time the district had been separated from the county in the establishment of North Savadkuh County. The rural district was transferred to the new Central District.
