= Mazdakati =

Mazdakati مزداكتي
- Village
- Location within Iran
- Coordinates: 36°23′00″N 52°40′00″E
- Country: Iran
- Province: Mazandaran
- County: Babol
- Bakhsh: Babol Kenar
- Rural District: Babol Kenar

Population (2006)
  - Total: 372
- Time zone: UTC+3:30 (IRST)
  - Summer (DST): UTC+4:30 (IRDT)

Mazdakati (Persian: مزداكتي, also Romanized as Mazdākatī) is a village in Babol Kenar Rural District, Babol Kenar District, Babol County, Mazandaran Province, Iran. At the 2006 census, its population was 372, in 85 families.
