= Narivaran =

Narivaran (Persian: ناريوران) may refer to:

- Narivaran-e Gharbi
- Narivaran-e Sharqi
