= Babol Kenar =

Babol Kenar (Persian: بابل‌کنار) may refer to:

- Babol Kenar District
- Babol Kenar Rural District
