= Rais Kola, North Savadkuh =

Village in Mazandaran province, Iran

Rais Kola Persian: رئيس كلا
- Village
- Location within Iran
- Coordinates: 36°12′41″N 52°42′37″E
- Country: Iran
- Province: Mazandaran
- County: North Savadkuh
- District: Central
- Rural District: Lafur

Population (2016)
  - Total: 507
- Time zone: UTC+3:30 (IRST)

Rais Kola (Persian: رئيس كلا) (Note: Also romanized as Ra’īs Kalā and Ra’īs Kolā) is a village in Lafur Rural District of the Central District in North Savadkuh County, Mazandaran province, Iran.

== Demographics ==
=== Population ===
At the time of the 2006 National Census, the village's population was 519 in 131 households, when it was in the former Shirgah District of Savadkuh County. The following census in 2011 counted 459 people in 140 households. The 2016 census measured the population of the village as 507 people in 181 households, by which time the district had been separated from the county in the establishment of North Savadkuh County. The rural district was transferred to the new Central District.
