= Kalij Kheyl =

Village in Mazandaran province, Iran

Kalij Kheyl Persian: كليج خيل
- Village
- Location within Iran
- Coordinates: 36°18′56″N 52°50′58″E
- Country: Iran
- Province: Mazandaran
- County: North Savadkuh
- District: Central
- Rural District: Sharq va Gharb-e Shirgah

Population (2016)
  - Total: 1,562
- Time zone: UTC+3:30 (IRST)

Kalij Kheyl (Persian: كليج خيل) (Note: Also romanized as Kalīj Kheyl) is a village in, and the capital of, Sharq va Gharb-e Shirgah Rural District in the Central District of North Savadkuh County, Mazandaran province, Iran.

== Demographics ==
=== Population ===
At the time of the 2006 National Census, the village's population was 1,526 in 417 households, when it was in the former Shirgah District of Savadkuh County. The following census in 2011 counted 1,427 people in 442 households. The 2016 census measured the population of the village as 1,562 people in 540 households, by which time the district had been separated from the county in the establishment of North Savadkuh County. The rural district was transferred to the new Central District. Kalij Kheyl was the most populous village in its rural district.
