= Tappeh Sar =

Village in Mazandaran province, Iran

Tappeh Sar Persian: تپه سر
- Village
- Location within Iran
- Coordinates: 36°19′54″N 52°52′00″E
- Country: Iran
- Province: Mazandaran
- County: North Savadkuh
- District: Central
- Rural District: Sharq va Gharb-e Shirgah

Population (2016)
  - Total: 93
- Time zone: UTC+3:30 (IRST)

Tappeh Sar (Persian: تپه سر) is a village in Sharq va Gharb-e Shirgah Rural District of the Central District in North Savadkuh County, Mazandaran province, Iran.

== Demographics ==
=== Population ===
At the time of the 2006 National Census, the village's population was 76 in 19 households, when it was in the former Shirgah District of Savadkuh County. The following census in 2011 counted 60 people in 15 households. The 2016 census measured the population of the village as 93 people in 37 households, by which time the district had been separated from the county in the establishment of North Savadkuh County. The rural district was transferred to the new Central District.
