= Ab Bandan Nonush =

Ab Bandan Nonush آب‌بندان ننوش آبندون ننوس (Mazandarani)
- Village
- Location within Iran
- Coordinates: 36°26′57″N 52°51′39″E
- Country: Iran
- Province: Mazandaran
- County: Babol
- Bakhsh: Bandpey-ye Sharqi
- Rural District: Sajjadrud

Population (2016)
  - Total: 78
- Time zone: UTC+3:30 (IRST)

Ab Bandan Nonush (Persian: آب‌بندان ننوش, Mazanderani: Ābandun Nēnus, also Romanized as Āb Bandān Nonūsh; also known as Ābandān Sar and Āb Bandān Sar) is a village in Sajjadrud Rural District, Bandpey-ye Sharqi District, Babol County, Mazandaran province, Iran. At the 2016 census, its population was 78, in 22 families.
