= Balef Kola =

Balef Kola (Persian: بالف كلا) may refer to:

- Balef Kola-ye Gharbi
- Balef Kola-ye Sharqi
