= Qoran Talar =

Qoran Talar قران تالار
- Village
- Location within Iran
- Coordinates: 36°18′25″N 52°46′27″E
- Country: Iran
- Province: Mazandaran
- County: Babol
- Bakhsh: Babol Kenar
- Rural District: Babol Kenar

Population (2006)
  - Total: 440
- Time zone: UTC+3:30 (IRST)
  - Summer (DST): UTC+4:30 (IRDT)

Qoran Talar (Persian: قران تالار, also Romanized as Qorān Tālār and Qorān Tālar; also known as Qorān Qālū) is a village in Babol Kenar Rural District, Babol Kenar District, Babol County, Mazandaran Province, Iran. At the 2006 census, its population was 440, in 135 families.
