= Darun Kola =

Darun Kala or Darun Kola (Persian: درونكلا) may refer to:

- Darun Kola-ye Gharbi
- Darun Kola-ye Sharqi
