= Vavali =

Vavali (Persian: وولي) may refer to:

- Vavali Galleh
- Vavali Gardan
