= Khvajeh Kola =

Khvajeh Kola or Khvajeh Kala (Persian: خواجه كلا) may refer to:

- Khvajeh Kola, Babol Kenar, Babol County
- Khvajeh Kola, Bandpey-ye Sharqi, Babol County
- Khvajeh Kola, Savadkuh, Savadkuh County
