= Khalil Kola =

Khalil Kola or Khalil Kala (Persian: خليل كلا) may refer to:

- Khalil Kola, Bandpey-ye Sharqi
- Khalil Kola, Lalehabad
