= Kali Kola =

Village in Mazandaran province, Iran

Kali Kola Persian: كالي كلا
- Village
- Location within Iran
- Coordinates: 36°13′38″N 52°43′56″E
- Country: Iran
- Province: Mazandaran
- County: North Savadkuh
- District: Central
- Rural District: Lafur

Population (2016)
  - Total: 850
- Time zone: UTC+3:30 (IRST)

Kali Kola (Persian: كالي كلا) (Note: Also romanized as Kālī Kalā and Kālī Kolā; also known as Kārī Kolā) is a village in Lafur Rural District of the Central District in North Savadkuh County, Mazandaran province, Iran.

== Demographics ==
=== Population ===
At the time of the 2006 National Census, the village's population was 772 in 194 households, when it was in the former Shirgah District of Savadkuh County. The following census in 2011 counted 870 people in 237 households. The 2016 census measured the population of the village as 850 people in 265 households, by which time the district had been separated from the county in the establishment of North Savadkuh County. The rural district was transferred to the new Central District. Kali Kola was the most populous village in its rural district.
