= Khartusi =

Coordinates: 36°18′01″N 52°39′54″E

Khartusi خرطوسي
- Village
- Interactive map of Khartusi
- Country: Iran
- Province: Mazandaran
- County: Babol
- Bakhsh: Bandpey-ye Sharqi
- Rural District: Sajjadrud

Population (2006)
  - Total: 92
- Time zone: UTC+3:30 (IRST)
  - Summer (DST): UTC+4:30 (IRDT)

Khartusi (Persian: خرطوسي, also Romanized as Kharţūsī) is a village in Sajjadrud Rural District, Bandpey-ye Sharqi District, Babol County, Mazandaran Province, Iran. At the 2006 census, its population was 92, in 24 families.
