= Ab Dang Sar, North Savadkuh =

Village in Mazandaran province, Iran

Ab Dang Sar Persian: ابدنگسر
- Village
- Location within Iran
- Coordinates: 36°19′31″N 52°52′10″E
- Country: Iran
- Province: Mazandaran
- County: North Savadkuh
- District: Central
- Rural District: Sharq va Gharb-e Shirgah

Population (2016)
  - Total: 287
- Time zone: UTC+3:30 (IRST)

Ab Dang Sar (Persian: آبدنگسر) (Note: Also romanized as Āb Dang Sar; also known as Udangesar (اودنگسر) in Mazandarani, and Odangesar, Udangisar, and Udangsar) is a village in Sharq va Gharb-e Shirgah Rural District of the Central District in North Savadkuh County, Mazandaran province, Iran.

== Demographics ==
=== Population ===
At the time of the 2006 National Census, the village's population was 266 in 59 households, when it was in the former Shirgah District of Savadkuh County. The following census in 2011 counted 253 people in 75 households. The 2016 census measured the population of the village as 287 people in 95 households, by which time the district had been separated from the county in the establishment of North Savadkuh County. The rural district was transferred to the new Central District.
