= Mamerz =

Mamerz (Persian: ممرز) may refer to:

- Mamerz Kan
- Mamerz Si
