= Shahrbon =

Coordinates: 36°22′59″N 52°38′22″E

Shahrbon شهربن
- Village
- Interactive map of Shahrbon
- Country: Iran
- Province: Mazandaran
- County: Babol
- Bakhsh: Bandpey-ye Sharqi
- Rural District: Sajjadrud

Population (2006)
  - Total: 128
- Time zone: UTC+3:30 (IRST)
  - Summer (DST): UTC+4:30 (IRDT)

Shahrbon (Persian: شهربن) is a village in Sajjadrud Rural District, Bandpey-ye Sharqi District, Babol County, Mazandaran Province, Iran. At the 2006 census, its population was 128, in 39 families.
