= Rais Kola =

Rais Kola or Rais Kala (Persian: رييس كلا or رئيس كلا) may refer to:

- Rais Kola, Babol (رييس كلا - Ra’īs Kolā)
- Rais Kola, Nur (رئيس كلا - Ra’īs Kolā)
- Rais Kola, Savadkuh (رئيس كلا - Ra’īs Kolā)
