= Chal Sarun =

Chal Sarun چالسرون
- Village
- Location within Iran
- Coordinates: 36°23′00″N 52°23′00″E
- Country: Iran
- Province: Mazandaran
- County: Babol
- Bakhsh: Bandpey-ye Sharqi
- Rural District: Firuzjah

Population (2006)
  - Total: 28
- Time zone: UTC+3:30 (IRST)
  - Summer (DST): UTC+4:30 (IRDT)

Chal Sarun (Persian: چالسرون, also Romanized as Chāl Sarūn; also known as Chāl Sarā) is a village in Firuzjah Rural District, Bandpey-ye Sharqi District, Babol County, Mazandaran Province, Iran. At the 2006 census, its population was 28, in 8 families.
