= Fek =

Fek or FEK may refer to:

- Fek, Iran
- Fek, Nepal
- Feck, a vernacular term in Hiberno-English, Scots and Middle English
- Ferkessédougou Airport, in the Ivory Coast
- Government Gazette (Greece)
