= Kari Kola =

Kari Kola or Kari Kala (Persian: كريكلا or كاريكلا) may refer to:

- Kari Kola, Babol (كريكلا - Karī Kolā)
- Kari Kola, Babolsar (كاريكلا - Kārī Kolā)
- Kari Kola, Savadkuh (كريكلا - Karī Kolā)
- Kari Kola, Shirgah, Savadkuh County (كاريكلا - Kārī Kolā)
