= Ganj Kola =

Ganj Kola (Persian: گنج كلا) may refer to:

- Ganj Kola-ye Bala
- Ganj Kola-ye Pain
