= Anjil Si Kabud Tabar =

Anjil Si Kabud Tabar انجيل سي كبودتبار
- Village
- Country: Iran
- Province: Mazandaran
- County: Babol
- Bakhsh: Babol Kenar
- Rural District: Deraz Kola

Population (2006)
  - Total: 66
- Time zone: UTC+3:30 (IRST)
  - Summer (DST): UTC+4:30 (IRDT)

Anjil Si Kabud Tabar (Persian: انجيل سي كبودتبار, also Romanized as Ānjīl Sī Kabūd Tabār) is a village in Deraz Kola Rural District, Babol Kenar District, Babol County, Mazandaran Province, Iran. At the 2006 census, its population was 66, in 17 families.
