= Mirar Kola =

Mirar Kola ميراركلا
- village
- Location within Iran
- Coordinates: 36°13′04″N 52°47′25″E
- Country: Iran
- Province: Mazandaran
- County: North Savadkuh
- Rural District: Lafur

Population (2016)
  - Total: 85
- Time zone: UTC+3:30 (IRST)

Mirar Kola (Persian: ميراركلا, also Romanized as Mīrar Kolā; also known as Mīzār Kolā) is a village in Lafur Rural District, North Savadkuh County, Mazandaran Province, Iran. At the 2016 census, its population was 85, in 40 families. Down from 92 in 2006.
