= Dardekasht =

Village in Mazandaran province, Iran

Dardekasht Persian: دارد كاشت
- Village
- Location within Iran
- Coordinates: 36°24′17″N 52°44′23″E
- Country: Iran
- Province: Mazandaran
- County: Babol
- District: Babol Kenar
- Rural District: Babol Kenar

Population (2016)
  - Total: 942
- Time zone: UTC+3:30 (IRST)

Dardekasht (Persian: دارد كاشت) (Note: Also romanized as Dārd Kāshet, Dārdekāsht, and Dārdekāšt) is a village in Babol Kenar Rural District of Babol Kenar District in Babol County, Mazandaran province, Iran.

== Demographics ==
=== Population ===
At the time of the 2006 National Census, the village's population was 1,111 in 285 households. The following census in 2011 counted 1,048 people in 327 households. The 2016 census measured the population of the village as 942 people in 315 households.
