= Zavar Deh =

Village in Mazandaran province, Iran

Zavar Deh Persian: زوارده
- Village
- Location within Iran
- Coordinates: 36°21′30″N 52°39′08″E
- Country: Iran
- Province: Mazandaran
- County: Babol
- District: Bandpey-e Sharqi
- Rural District: Sajjadrud

Population (2016)
  - Total: 671
- Time zone: UTC+3:30 (IRST)

Zavar Deh (Persian: زوارده) (Note: Also romanized as Zavār Deh) is a village in Sajjadrud Rural District of Bandpey-e Sharqi District in Babol County, Mazandaran province, Iran.

== Demographics ==
=== Population ===
At the time of the 2006 National Census, the village's population was 591 in 141 households. The following census in 2011 counted 625 people in 179 households. The 2016 census measured the population of the village as 671 people in 211 households.
