= Vatileh =

Village in Mazandaran province, Iran

Vatileh Persian: وتيله
- Village
- Location within Iran
- Coordinates: 36°12′21″N 52°39′47″E
- Country: Iran
- Province: Mazandaran
- County: Babol
- District: Bandpey-e Sharqi
- Rural District: Firuzjah

Population (2016)
  - Total: 233
- Time zone: UTC+3:30 (IRST)

Vatileh (Persian: وتيله) (Note: Also romanized as Vatīleh) is a village in Firuzjah Rural District of Bandpey-e Sharqi District in Babol County, Mazandaran province, Iran.

== Demographics ==
=== Population ===
At the time of the 2006 National Census, the village's population was 232 in 56 households. The following census in 2011 counted 308 people in 48 households. The 2016 census measured the population of the village as 233 people in 60 households.
