= Narivaran-e Gharbi =

Narivaran-e Gharbi ناريوران غربي
- Village
- Location within Iran
- Coordinates: 36°21′29″N 52°38′46″E
- Country: Iran
- Province: Mazandaran
- County: Babol
- Bakhsh: Bandpey-ye Sharqi
- Rural District: Sajjadrud

Population (2006)
  - Total: 390
- Time zone: UTC+3:30 (IRST)
  - Summer (DST): UTC+4:30 (IRDT)

Narivaran-e Gharbi (Persian: ناريوران غربي, also Romanized as Nārīvarān-e Gharbī; also known as Nārīvarān) is a village in Sajjadrud Rural District, Bandpey-ye Sharqi District, Babol County, Mazandaran Province, Iran. At the 2006 census, its population was 390, in 96 families.
