= Tirkan, Mazandaran =

Village in Mazandaran province, Iran

Tirkan Persian: تيركن
- Village
- Location within Iran
- Coordinates: 36°16′09″N 52°43′49″E
- Country: Iran
- Province: Mazandaran
- County: Babol
- District: Babol Kenar
- Rural District: Deraz Kola

Population (2016)
  - Total: 205
- Time zone: UTC+3:30 (IRST)

Tirkan (Persian: تيركن) (Note: Also romanized as Tīrkan) is a village in Deraz Kola Rural District of Babol Kenar District in Babol County, Mazandaran province, Iran.

== Demographics ==
=== Population ===
At the time of the 2006 National Census, the village's population was 192 in 56 households. The following census in 2011 counted 189 people in 58 households. The 2016 census measured the population of the village as 205 people in 67 households.
