= Deraz Kola =

Village in Mazandaran province, Iran

Deraz Kola Persian: درازكلا
- Village
- Location within Iran
- Coordinates: 36°20′03″N 52°43′51″E
- Country: Iran
- Province: Mazandaran
- County: Babol
- District: Babol Kenar
- Rural District: Deraz Kola

Population (2016)
  - Total: 1,694
- Time zone: UTC+3:30 (IRST)

Deraz Kola (Persian: درازكلا) (Note: Also romanized as Derāz Kalā and Derāz Kolā) is a village in, and the capital of, Deraz Kola Rural District in Babol Kenar District of Babol County, Mazandaran province, Iran.

== Demographics ==
=== Population ===
At the time of the 2006 National Census, the village's population was 1,226 in 358 households. The following census in 2011 counted 1,478 people in 484 households. The 2016 census measured the population of the village as 1,694 people in 573 households.
