= Shirgah =

City in Mazandaran province, Iran

Shirgah Persian: شيرگاه
- City
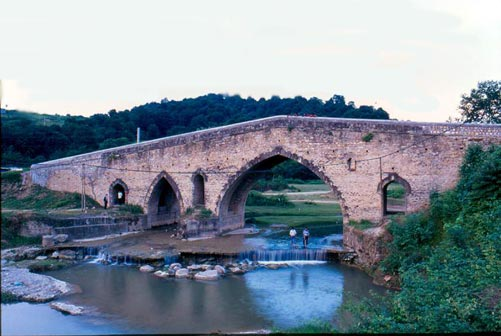
- Shahpur Bridge in the city of Shirgah

- Location within Iran
- Coordinates: 36°18′06″N 52°52′55″E
- Country: Iran
- Province: Mazandaran
- County: North Savadkuh
- District: Central

Population (2016)
  - Total: 8,671
- Time zone: UTC+3:30 (IRST)

Shirgah (Persian: شيرگاه) (Note: Also romanized as Shīr Gāh and Shīrgāh) is a city in the Central District of North Savadkuh County, Mazandaran province, Iran, serving as capital of both the county and the district. The road connecting Tehran to Qaem Shahr passes through the city, as does the railway from Tehran to the north.

== History ==
It seems that this city does not have much documented history, because the early inhabitants of the city lived in Chali and Tappeh Sar, and especially in Ab Dang Sar. The city's inhabitants built their houses on highlands so that they could defend themselves against thieves and rebels.

During the time of Reza Khan, a brave man named Hezhbar Sultan fought with Reza Khan and sometimes entered Shirgah to take food, clothes, etc. from the people. During World War II, some Russian troops settled in a small section near Kaligkhel (Shirgah village), who later came to Rusabad to resupply and rebuild.

== Demographics ==
=== Population ===
At the time of the 2006 National Census, the city's population was 8,529 in 2,269 households, when it was capital of the former Shirgah District in Savadkuh County. The following census in 2011 counted 8,129 people in 2,439 households. The 2016 census measured the population of the city as 8,671 people in 2,869 households, by which time the district had separated from the county in the establishment of North Savadkuh County. Shirgah was transferred to the new Central District as the county's capital.

== Economy and geography ==
The occupation of most people in this area is agriculture and farming, because this area is surrounded by mountains on all sides except for the fields in the north and has fertile lands. Its mountains are called Terez in the west, Veresk in the east, and Sāre-Sar and Shah-Kuh in the south. Shirgāh is the confluence of two rivers of Mazandaran, Telar and Kaslian. Telar originates from the slopes of Gāduk. The occupation of the people of this city is logging and animal husbandry. During the commute to the forests of this area, the gradual migration of people to Shirgāh led to the construction of small houses that became their permanent homes. People settled in the current city and its slopes, which led to the creation of the initial center of Shirgāh.

There are only three factories in this city. Wood industries, one in Chali, Pichkoban in Sartepeh, and the wood impregnation factory, which was established in 1932 AD (1311 solar year) and its production is limited due to the less use of wooden bars in the railway. This factory was the first wood impregnation factory in Iran.

Because of the many valleys and bridges, Shirgah is called the city of bridges. Of these bridges, the most famous are the Dokhtar Bridge (in Chali), the historical Shah Abbas Bridge (built during the Safavid era), the Ab Dang Sar Bridge (on the Qaemshahr road), and the Shahpur Bridge. Several other bridges have also been built, such as the railway bridge in Tappeh Sar, two bridges in the city, on the Qaemshahr road, and outside the city.
