= Anarestan, Mazandaran =

Village in Mazandaran province, Iran

Anarestan Persian: انارستان
- Village
- Location within Iran
- Coordinates: 36°24′37″N 52°42′40″E
- Country: Iran
- Province: Mazandaran
- County: Babol
- District: Babol Kenar
- Rural District: Babol Kenar

Population (2016)
  - Total: 634
- Time zone: UTC+3:30 (IRST)

Anarestan (Persian: انارستان) (Note: Also romanized as Anārestān) is a village in Babol Kenar Rural District of Babol Kenar District in Babol County, Mazandaran province, Iran.

== Demographics ==
=== Population ===
At the time of the 2006 National Census, the village's population was 635 in 146 households. The following census in 2011 counted 680 people in 198 households. The 2016 census measured the population of the village, as 634 people in 193 households.
