= Talvat =

Village in Mazandaran province, Iran

Talvat Persian: طلوت
- Village
- Location within Iran
- Coordinates: 36°26′12″N 52°42′53″E
- Country: Iran
- Province: Mazandaran
- County: Babol
- District: Babol Kenar
- Rural District: Babol Kenar

Population (2016)
  - Total: 1,056
- Time zone: UTC+3:30 (IRST)

Talvat (Persian: طلوت) (Note: Also romanized as Talūt, Ţalvat, and Tolūt) is a village in Babol Kenar Rural District of Babol Kenar District in Babol County, Mazandaran province, Iran.

== Demographics ==
=== Population ===
At the time of the 2006 National Census, the village's population was 1,040 in 266 households. The following census in 2011 counted 1,088 people in 312 households. The 2016 census measured the population of the village as 1,056 people in 362 households.
