= Kardar Kola =

Village in Mazandaran province, Iran

Kardar Kola Persian: كاردركلا
- Village
- Location within Iran
- Coordinates: 36°18′27″N 52°45′40″E
- Country: Iran
- Province: Mazandaran
- County: Babol
- District: Babol Kenar
- Rural District: Deraz Kola

Population (2016)
  - Total: 662
- Time zone: UTC+3:30 (IRST)

Kardar Kola (Persian: كاردركلا) (Note: Also romanized as Kardar Kolā; also known as Kār Degar Kolā, Kār Der Kolā, Kārdgar Kalā, and Kārdgar Kolā) is a village in Deraz Kola Rural District of Babol Kenar District in Babol County, Mazandaran province, Iran.

== Demographics ==
=== Population ===
At the time of the 2006 National Census, the village's population was 546 in 167 households. The following census in 2011 counted 696 people in 238 households. The 2016 census measured the population of the village as 662 people in 256 households.
