= Kashi Kola =

Village in Mazandaran province, Iran

Kashi Kola Persian: كاشيكلا
- Village
- Location within Iran
- Coordinates: 36°21′27″N 52°37′40″E
- Country: Iran
- Province: Mazandaran
- County: Babol
- District: Bandpey-e Sharqi
- Rural District: Sajjadrud

Population (2016)
  - Total: 796
- Time zone: UTC+3:30 (IRST)

Kashi Kola (Persian: كاشيكلا) (Note: Also romanized as Kāshī Kalā and Kāshī Kolā)) is a village in Sajjadrud Rural District of Bandpey-e Sharqi District in Babol County, Mazandaran province, Iran.

== Demographics ==
=== Population ===
At the time of the 2006 National Census, the village's population was 694 in 173 households. The following census in 2011 counted 706 people in 206 households. The 2016 census measured the population of the village as 796 people in 270 households.
