= Siah Darka =

Village in Mazandaran province, Iran

Siah Darka Persian: سياه دركا
- Village
- Location within Iran
- Coordinates: 36°21′44″N 52°44′51″E
- Country: Iran
- Province: Mazandaran
- County: Babol
- District: Babol Kenar
- Rural District: Babol Kenar

Population (2016)
  - Total: 938
- Time zone: UTC+3:30 (IRST)

Siah Darka (Persian: سياه دركا) (Note: Also romanized as Seyāh Darkā and Sīāh Darkā) is a village in Babol Kenar Rural District of Babol Kenar District in Babol County, Mazandaran province, Iran.

== Demographics ==
=== Population ===
At the time of the 2006 National Census, the village's population was 1,129 in 290 households. The following census in 2011 counted 1,088 people in 339 households. The 2016 census measured the population of the village as 938 people in 328 households.
