= Hali Khal =

Village in Mazandaran province, Iran

Hali Khal Persian: هلي خال
- Village
- Location within Iran
- Coordinates: 36°20′12″N 52°41′13″E
- Country: Iran
- Province: Mazandaran
- County: Babol
- District: Babol Kenar
- Rural District: Deraz Kola

Population (2016)
  - Total: 586
- Time zone: UTC+3:30 (IRST)

Hali Khal (Persian: هلي خال) (Note: Also romanized as Halī Khāl) is a village in Deraz Kola Rural District of Babol Kenar District in Babol County, Mazandaran province, Iran.

== Demographics ==
=== Population ===
At the time of the 2006 National Census, the village's population was 247 in 59 households. The following census in 2011 counted 524 people in 167 households. The 2016 census measured the population of the village as 586 people in 192 households.
