= Balef Kola-ye Gharbi =

Balef Kola-ye Gharbi بالف كلاغربي
- Village
- Location within Iran
- Coordinates: 36°20′07″N 52°44′53″E
- Country: Iran
- Province: Mazandaran
- County: Babol
- Bakhsh: Babol Kenar
- Rural District: Deraz Kola

Population (2006)
  - Total: 105
- Time zone: UTC+3:30 (IRST)
  - Summer (DST): UTC+4:30 (IRDT)

Balef Kola-ye Gharbi (Persian: بالف كلاغربي, also Romanized as Bālef Kolā-ye Gharbī) is a village in Deraz Kola Rural District, Babol Kenar District, Babol County, Mazandaran Province, Iran. At the 2006 census, its population was 105, in 33 families.
