= Sarjah Kola =

Village in Mazandaran province, Iran

Sarjah Kola Persian: سرجه كلا
- Village
- Location within Iran
- Coordinates: 36°13′04″N 52°38′39″E
- Country: Iran
- Province: Mazandaran
- County: Babol
- District: Bandpey-e Sharqi
- Rural District: Firuzjah

Population (2016)
  - Total: 103
- Time zone: UTC+3:30 (IRST)

Sarjah Kola (Persian: سرجه كلا) (Note: Also romanized as Sarjah Kolā) is a village in Firuzjah Rural District of Bandpey-e Sharqi District in Babol County, Mazandaran province, Iran.

== Demographics ==
=== Population ===
At the time of the 2006 National Census, the village's population was 51 in 15 households. The following census in 2011 counted 71 people in 27 households. The 2016 census measured the population of the village as 103 people in 37 households.
