= Gord Rudbar =

Village in Mazandaran province, Iran

Gord Rudbar Persian: گردرودبار
- Village
- Location within Iran
- Coordinates: 36°21′39″N 52°40′14″E
- Country: Iran
- Province: Mazandaran
- County: Babol
- District: Bandpey-e Sharqi
- Rural District: Sajjadrud

Population (2016)
  - Total: 991
- Time zone: UTC+3:30 (IRST)

Gord Rudbar (Persian: گردرودبار) (Note: Also romanized as Gerd Rūdbār and Gord Rūdbār; also known as Kord Rūdbār) is a village in Sajjadrud Rural District of Bandpey-e Sharqi District in Babol County, Mazandaran province, Iran.

== Demographics ==
=== Population ===
At the time of the 2006 National Census, the village's population was 959 in 265 households. The following census in 2011 counted 966 people in 273 households. The 2016 census measured the population of the village as 991 people in 315 households.
