= Seyyed Kola, Babol Kenar =

Village in Mazandaran province, Iran

Seyyed Kola Persian: سيدكلا
- Village
- Location within Iran
- Coordinates: 36°18′46″N 52°47′29″E
- Country: Iran
- Province: Mazandaran
- County: Babol
- District: Babol Kenar
- Rural District: Babol Kenar

Population (2016)
  - Total: 736
- Time zone: UTC+3:30 (IRST)

Seyyed Kola (Persian: سيدكلا) (Note: Also romanized as Seyyed Kalā and Seyyed Kolā) is a village in Babol Kenar Rural District of Babol Kenar District in Babol County, Mazandaran province, Iran.

== Demographics ==
=== Population ===
At the time of the 2006 National Census, the village's population was 865 in 241 households. The following census in 2011 counted 755 people in 252 households. The 2016 census measured the population of the village as 736 people in 259 households.
