= Firuz Ja-ye Sabet =

Village in Mazandaran province, Iran

Firuz Ja-ye Sabet Persian: فيروزجاثابت
- Village
- Location within Iran
- Coordinates: 36°11′50″N 52°39′26″E
- Country: Iran
- Province: Mazandaran
- County: Babol
- District: Bandpey-e Sharqi
- Rural District: Firuzjah

Population (2016)
  - Total: 275
- Time zone: UTC+3:30 (IRST)

Firuz Ja-ye Sabet (Persian: فيروزجاثابت) (Note: Also romanized as Fīrūz Jā-ye S̄ābet; also known as Fīrūz Jāh and Fīrūz Jāh-e S̄ābet) is a village in, and the capital of, Firuzjah Rural District in Bandpey-e Sharqi District of Babol County, Mazandaran province, Iran.

== Demographics ==
=== Population ===
At the time of the 2006 National Census, the village's population was 408 in 89 households. The following census in 2011 counted 386 people in 86 households. The 2016 census measured the population of the village as 275 people in 92 households. It was the most populous village in its rural district.
