= Tahamtan Kola =

Village in Mazandaran province, Iran

Tahamtan Kola Persian: تهمتن كلا
- Village
- Location within Iran
- Coordinates: 36°19′24″N 52°38′08″E
- Country: Iran
- Province: Mazandaran
- County: Babol
- District: Bandpey-e Sharqi
- Rural District: Sajjadrud

Population (2016)
  - Total: 1,184
- Time zone: UTC+3:30 (IRST)

Tahamtan Kola (Persian: تهمتن كلا) (Note: Also romanized as Tahamtan Kolā) is a village in Sajjadrud Rural District of Bandpey-e Sharqi District in Babol County, Mazandaran province, Iran.

== Demographics ==
=== Population ===
At the time of the 2006 National Census, the village's population was 926 in 229 households. The following census in 2011 counted 1,129 people in 300 households. The 2016 census measured the population of the village as 1,184 people in 352 households.
