= Chehreh =

Village in Mazandaran province, Iran

Chehreh Persian: چهره
- Village
- Location within Iran
- Coordinates: 36°20′54″N 52°43′44″E
- Country: Iran
- Province: Mazandaran
- County: Babol
- District: Babol Kenar
- Rural District: Babol Kenar

Population (2016)
  - Total: 759
- Time zone: UTC+3:30 (IRST)

Chehreh (Persian: چهره) is a village in Babol Kenar Rural District of Babol Kenar District in Babol County, Mazandaran province, Iran.

== Demographics ==
=== Population ===
At the time of the 2006 National Census, the village's population was 744 in 203 households. The following census in 2011 counted 783 people in 265 households. The 2016 census measured the population of the village as 759 people in 266 households.
