= Hatkeh Rural District =

Rural district in Mazandaran province, Iran

Hatkeh Rural District Persian: دهستان هتکه
- Rural District
- Location within Iran
- Coordinates: 36°22′N 52°50′E
- Country: Iran
- Province: Mazandaran
- County: North Savadkuh
- District: Narenjestan
- Established: 2013
- Capital: Bur Kheyl

Population (2016)
  - Total: 3,621
- Time zone: UTC+3:30 (IRST)

Hatkeh Rural District (Persian: دهستان هتکه) is in Narenjestan District of North Savadkuh County, Mazandaran province, Iran. Its capital is the village of Bur Kheyl.

== History ==
In 2013, Shirgah District was separated from Savadkuh County in the establishment of North Savadkuh County, and Hatkeh Rural District was created in the new Narenjestan District.

== Demographics ==
=== Population ===
At the time of the 2016 National Census, the rural district's population was 3,621 in 1,249 households. The most populous of its eight villages was Ivek, with 1,048 people.

=== Other villages in the rural district ===
- Bazir Kola
- Faramarz Kola
- Hajji Kola
- Hatkehlu
- Koti Lateh
- Mangol
