= Gavzan Mahalleh, Bandpey-e Sharqi =

Village in Mazandaran province, Iran

Gavzan Mahalleh Persian: گاوزن محله
- Village
- Location within Iran
- Coordinates: 36°10′56″N 52°37′19″E
- Country: Iran
- Province: Mazandaran
- County: Babol
- District: Bandpey-e Sharqi
- Rural District: Firuzjah

Population (2016)
  - Total: 157
- Time zone: UTC+3:30 (IRST)

Gavzan Mahalleh (Persian: گاوزن محله) (Note: Also romanized as Gāvzan Maḩalleh) is a village in Firuzjah Rural District of Bandpey-e Sharqi District in Babol County, Mazandaran province, Iran.

== Demographics ==
=== Population ===
At the time of the 2006 National Census, the village's population was 121 in 41 households. The following census in 2011 counted 118 people in 45 households. The 2016 census measured the population of the village as 157 people in 51 households.
