= Kola Gar Sara =

Kola Gar Sara (Persian: كلاگرسرا) may refer to:

- Kola Gar Sara, Babol
- Kola Gar Sara, Fereydunkenar
