= Shah Reza Gavzan Mahalleh =

Village in Mazandaran province, Iran

Shah Reza Gavzan Mahalleh Persian: شاهرضاگاوزن محله
- Village
- Location within Iran
- Coordinates: 36°25′29″N 52°42′27″E
- Country: Iran
- Province: Mazandaran
- County: Babol
- District: Babol Kenar
- Rural District: Babol Kenar

Population (2016)
  - Total: 556
- Time zone: UTC+3:30 (IRST)

Shah Reza Gavzan Mahalleh (Persian: شاهرضاگاوزن محله) (Note: Also romanized as Shāh Rez̤ā Gāvzan Maḩalleh) is a village in Babol Kenar Rural District of Babol Kenar District in Babol County, Mazandaran province, Iran.

== Demographics ==
=== Population ===
At the time of the 2006 National Census, the village's population was 542 in 137 households. The following census in 2011 counted 571 people in 180 households. The 2016 census measured the population of the village as 556 people in 179 households.
