= Ledar =

Village in Mazandaran province, Iran

Ledar Persian: لدار
- Village
- Location within Iran
- Coordinates: 36°20′03″N 52°39′49″E
- Country: Iran
- Province: Mazandaran
- County: Babol
- District: Bandpey-e Sharqi
- Rural District: Sajjadrud

Population (2016)
  - Total: 531
- Time zone: UTC+3:30 (IRST)

Ledar (Persian: لدار) (Note: Also romanized as Ledār) is a village in Sajjadrud Rural District of Bandpey-e Sharqi District in Babol County, Mazandaran province, Iran.

== Demographics ==
=== Population ===
At the time of the 2006 National Census, the village's population was 664 in 158 households. The following census in 2011 counted 601 people in 166 households. The 2016 census measured the population of the village as 531 people in 167 households.
