= Firuzabad, Bandpey-e Sharqi =

Village in Mazandaran province, Iran

Firuzabad Persian: فیروزآباد
- Village
- Location within Iran
- Country: Iran
- Province: Mazandaran
- County: Babol
- District: Bandpey-e Sharqi
- Rural District: Sajjadrud

Population (2016)
  - Total: 541
- Time zone: UTC+3:30 (IRST)

Firuzabad (Persian: فيروزاباد) (Note: Also romanized as Fīrūzābād; also known as Firozabad, also romanized as Fīrozābād; formerly known as Shah Kola (شاه كلا), also romanized as Shāh Kolā) is a village in Sajjadrud Rural District of Bandpey-e Sharqi District in Babol County, Mazandaran province, Iran.

== Demographics ==
=== Population ===
At the time of the 2006 National Census, the village's population was 439 in 112 households. The following census in 2011 counted 559 people in 157 households. The 2016 census measured the population of the village as 541 people in 156 households.
