= Balef Kola-ye Sharqi =

Balef Kola-ye Sharqi بالف كلاشرقي
- Village
- Location within Iran
- Coordinates: 36°20′35″N 52°45′08″E
- Country: Iran
- Province: Mazandaran
- County: Babol
- Bakhsh: Babol Kenar
- Rural District: Babol Kenar

Population (2006)
  - Total: 342
- Time zone: UTC+3:30 (IRST)
  - Summer (DST): UTC+4:30 (IRDT)

Balef Kola-ye Sharqi (Persian: بالف كلاشرقي, also Romanized as Bālef Kolā-ye Sharqī) is a village in Babol Kenar Rural District, Babol Kenar District, Babol County, Mazandaran Province, Iran. At the 2006 census, its population was 342, in 116 families.
