= Pust Kola =

Village in Mazandaran province, Iran

Pust Kola Persian: پوست كلا
- Village
- Location within Iran
- Coordinates: 36°20′00″N 52°38′39″E
- Country: Iran
- Province: Mazandaran
- County: Babol
- District: Bandpey-e Sharqi
- Rural District: Sajjadrud

Population (2016)
  - Total: 1,086
- Time zone: UTC+3:30 (IRST)

Pust Kola (Persian: پوست كلا) (Note: Also romanized as Pūst Kalā, Pūst Kolā, and Pust Kolā) is a village in Sajjadrud Rural District of Bandpey-e Sharqi District in Babol County, Mazandaran province, Iran.

== Demographics ==
=== Population ===
At the time of the 2006 National Census, the village's population was 1,137 in 284 households. The following census in 2011 counted 1,052 people in 306 households. The 2016 census measured the population of the village as 1,086 people in 355 households.
