= Ari, Iran =

Village in Mazandaran province, Iran

Ari Persian: آری
- Village
- Location within Iran
- Coordinates: 36°12′31″N 52°40′37″E
- Country: Iran
- Province: Mazandaran
- County: Babol
- District: Bandpey-e Sharqi
- Rural District: Firuzjah

Population (2016)
  - Total: 218
- Time zone: UTC+3:30 (IRST)

Ari (Persian: آری) (Note: Also romanized as Ārī) is a village in Firuzjah Rural District of Bandpey-e Sharqi District in Babol County, Mazandaran province, Iran.

== Demographics ==
=== Population ===
At the time of the 2006 National Census, the village's population was 179 in 45 households. The following census in 2011 counted 302 people in 46 households. The 2016 census measured the population of the village as 218 people in 55 households.
