= Halidasht =

Village in Mazandaran province, Iran

Halidasht Persian: هليدشت
- Village
- Location within Iran
- Coordinates: 36°24′59″N 52°44′06″E
- Country: Iran
- Province: Mazandaran
- County: Babol
- District: Babol Kenar
- Rural District: Babol Kenar

Population (2016)
  - Total: 965
- Time zone: UTC+3:30 (IRST)

Halidasht (Persian: هليدشت) (Note: Also romanized as Halīdasht) is a village in Babol Kenar Rural District of Babol Kenar District in Babol County, Mazandaran province, Iran.

== Demographics ==
=== Population ===
At the time of the 2006 National Census, the village's population was 935 in 237 households. The following census in 2011 counted 924 people in 271 households. The 2016 census measured the population of the village as 965 people in 304 households.
