= Azarsi-ye Taskanu =

Azarsi-ye Taskanu ازارسي تسكانو
- Village
- Country: Iran
- Province: Mazandaran
- County: Babol
- Bakhsh: Babol Kenar
- Rural District: Deraz Kola

Population (2006)
  - Total: 22
- Time zone: UTC+3:30 (IRST)
  - Summer (DST): UTC+4:30 (IRDT)

Azarsi-ye Taskanu (Persian: ازارسي تسكانو, also Romanized as Āzārsī-ye Taskānū) is a village in Deraz Kola Rural District, Babol Kenar District, Babol County, Mazandaran Province, Iran. At the 2006 census, its population was 22, in 5 families.
