= Sama Gush Mahalleh =

Village in Mazandaran province, Iran

Sama Gush Mahalleh Persian: سماگوش محله
- Village
- Location within Iran
- Coordinates: 36°11′08″N 52°37′54″E
- Country: Iran
- Province: Mazandaran
- County: Babol
- District: Bandpey-e Sharqi
- Rural District: Firuzjah

Population (2016)
  - Total: 102
- Time zone: UTC+3:30 (IRST)

Sama Gush Mahalleh (Persian: سماگوش محله) (Note: Also romanized as Samā Gūsh Maḩalleh; also known as Samā’ Kūsh Maḩalleh and Samā Kūsh Maḩalleh) is a village in Firuzjah Rural District of Bandpey-e Sharqi District in Babol County, Mazandaran province, Iran.

== Demographics ==
=== Population ===
At the time of the 2006 National Census, the village's population was 127 in 41 households. The following census in 2011 counted 187 people in 75 households. The 2016 census measured the population of the village as 102 people in 45 households.
