= Azarsi-ye Nematollah =

Azarsi-ye Nematollah ازارسي نعمت اله
- Village
- Country: Iran
- Province: Mazandaran
- County: Babol
- Bakhsh: Babol Kenar
- Rural District: Deraz Kola

Population (2006)
  - Total: 63
- Time zone: UTC+3:30 (IRST)
  - Summer (DST): UTC+4:30 (IRDT)

Azarsi-ye Nematollah (Persian: ازارسي نعمت اله, also Romanized as Āzārsī-ye Neʿmatollah) is a village in Deraz Kola Rural District, Babol Kenar District, Babol County, Mazandaran Province, Iran. At the 2006 census, its population was 63, in 16 families.
