= Tashun =

Village in Mazandaran province, Iran

Tashun Persian: تشون
- Village
- Location within Iran
- Coordinates: 36°20′33″N 52°38′20″E
- Country: Iran
- Province: Mazandaran
- County: Babol
- District: Bandpey-e Sharqi
- Rural District: Sajjadrud

Population (2016)
  - Total: 558
- Time zone: UTC+3:30 (IRST)

Tashun (Persian: تشون) (Note: Also romanized as Tashūn) is a village in Sajjadrud Rural District of Bandpey-e Sharqi District in Babol County, Mazandaran province, Iran.

== Demographics ==
=== Population ===
At the time of the 2006 National Census, the village's population was 529 in 123 households. The following census in 2011 counted 587 people in 156 households. The 2016 census measured the population of the village as 558 people in 171 households.
