= Amir Kola, Babol Kenar =

Village in Mazandaran province, Iran

Amir Kola Persian: اميركلا
- Village
- Location within Iran
- Coordinates: 36°19′12″N 52°44′50″E
- Country: Iran
- Province: Mazandaran
- County: Babol
- District: Babol Kenar
- Rural District: Deraz Kola

Population (2016)
  - Total: 464
- Time zone: UTC+3:30 (IRST)

Amir Kola (Persian: اميركلا) (Note: Also romanized as Amīr Kalā and Amīr Kolā) is a village in Deraz Kola Rural District of Babol Kenar District in Babol County, Mazandaran province, Iran.

== Demographics ==
=== Population ===
At the time of the 2006 National Census, the village's population was 466 in 158 households. The following census in 2011 counted 530 people in 194 households. The 2016 census measured the population of the village as 464 people in 186 households.
