= Fulad Kola, Babol =

Village in Mazandaran province, Iran

Fulad Kola Persian: فولادكلا
- Village
- Location within Iran
- Coordinates: 36°24′51″N 52°44′24″E
- Country: Iran
- Province: Mazandaran
- County: Babol
- District: Babol Kenar
- Rural District: Babol Kenar

Population (2016)
  - Total: 353
- Time zone: UTC+3:30 (IRST)

Fulad Kola (Persian: فولادكلا) (Note: Also romanized as Fūlād Kolā) is a village in Babol Kenar Rural District of Babol Kenar District in Babol County, Mazandaran province, Iran.

== Demographics ==
=== Population ===
At the time of the 2006 National Census, the village's population was 337 in 79 households. The following census in 2011 counted 335 people in 100 households. The 2016 census measured the population of the village as 353 people in 120 households.
