= Ganj Afruz =

Ganj Afruz (Persian: گنج افروز) may refer to:

- Bala Ganj Afruz
- Pain Ganj Afruz
