= Kebria Kola =

Village in Mazandaran province, Iran

Kebria Kola Persian: كبرياكلا
- Village
- Location within Iran
- Coordinates: 36°19′56″N 52°44′04″E
- Country: Iran
- Province: Mazandaran
- County: Babol
- District: Babol Kenar
- Rural District: Deraz Kola

Population (2016)
  - Total: 1,925
- Time zone: UTC+3:30 (IRST)

Kebria Kola (Persian: كبرياكلا) (Note: Also romanized as Kebrīā Kolā) is a village in Deraz Kola Rural District of Babol Kenar District in Babol County, Mazandaran province, Iran.

== Demographics ==
=== Population ===
At the time of the 2006 National Census, the village's population was 1,885 in 570 households. The following census in 2011 counted 1,872 people in 644 households. The 2016 census measured the population of the village as 1,925 people in 681 households. It was the most populous village in its rural district.
