= Afrasi, Savadkuh =

Afrasi افراسي
- village
- Interactive map of Afrasi
- Coordinates: 36°14′21.9″N 52°43′52.9″E
- Country: Iran
- Province: Mazandaran
- County: North Savadkuh
- Rural District: Lafur

Population (2016)
  - Total: 155
- Time zone: UTC+3:30 (IRST)

Afrasi (Persian: افراسي, also Romanized as Āfrāsī) is a village in Lafur Rural District, North Savadkuh County, Mazandaran Province, Iran. At the 2016 census, its population was 155, in 52 families. Up from 130 in 2006.
