= Edmola =

Village in Mazandaran province, Iran

Edmola Persian: ادملا
- Village
- Location within Iran
- Coordinates: 36°18′39″N 52°35′41″E
- Country: Iran
- Province: Mazandaran
- County: Babol
- District: Bandpey-e Sharqi
- Rural District: Sajjadrud

Population (2016)
  - Total: 1,239
- Time zone: UTC+3:30 (IRST)

Edmola (Persian: ادملا) (Note: Also romanized as Edmolā) is a village in Sajjadrud Rural District of Bandpey-e Sharqi District in Babol County, Mazandaran province, Iran.

== Demographics ==
=== Population ===
At the time of the 2006 National Census, the village's population was 1,023 in 248 households. The following census in 2011 counted 1,378 people in 335 households. The 2016 census measured the population of the village as 1,239 people in 390 households.
