= Azarsi-ye Sadollah =

Azarsi-ye Sadollah ازارسي سعداله
- Village
- Country: Iran
- Province: Mazandaran
- County: Babol
- Bakhsh: Bandpey-ye Sharqi
- Rural District: Sajjadrud

Population (2006)
  - Total: 39
- Time zone: UTC+3:30 (IRST)
  - Summer (DST): UTC+4:30 (IRDT)

Azarsi-ye Sadollah (Persian: ازارسي سعداله, also Romanized as Āzārsī-ye Saʿdollah) is a village in Sajjadrud Rural District, Bandpey-ye Sharqi District, Babol County, Mazandaran Province, Iran. At the 2006 census, its population was 39, in 9 families.
