= Shir Dar Kola =

Village in Mazandaran province, Iran

Shir Dar Kola Persian: شيرداركلا
- Village
- Location within Iran
- Coordinates: 36°20′15″N 52°46′01″E
- Country: Iran
- Province: Mazandaran
- County: Babol
- District: Babol Kenar
- Rural District: Babol Kenar

Population (2016)
  - Total: 1,138
- Time zone: UTC+3:30 (IRST)

Shir Dar Kola (Persian: شيرداركلا) (Note: Also romanized as Shīr Dār Kolā) is a village in Babol Kenar Rural District of Babol Kenar District in Babol County, Mazandaran province, Iran.

== Demographics ==
=== Population ===
At the time of the 2006 National Census, the village's population was 1,338 in 384 households. The following census in 2011 counted 1,282 people in 451 households. The 2016 census measured the population of the village as 1,138 people in 439 households.
