= Ganj Kola-ye Bala =

Ganj Kola-ye Bala گنج كلابالا
- Village
- Location within Iran
- Coordinates: 36°19′46″N 52°37′33″E
- Country: Iran
- Province: Mazandaran
- County: Babol
- Bakhsh: Bandpey-ye Sharqi
- Rural District: Sajjadrud

Population (2006)
  - Total: 578
- Time zone: UTC+3:30 (IRST)
  - Summer (DST): UTC+4:30 (IRDT)

Ganj Kola-ye Bala (Persian: گنج كلابالا, also Romanized as Ganj Kolā-ye Bālā; also known as Bālā Ganjkolāh) is a village in Sajjadrud Rural District, Bandpey-ye Sharqi District, Babol County, Mazandaran Province, Iran. At the 2006 census, its population was 578, in 153 families.
