= Azarsi-ye Hoseyn Khanzadeh =

Azarsi-ye Hoseyn Khanzadeh ازارسي حسين خان زاده
- Village
- Country: Iran
- Province: Mazandaran
- County: Babol
- Bakhsh: Babol Kenar
- Rural District: Deraz Kola

Population (2006)
  - Total: 20
- Time zone: UTC+3:30 (IRST)
  - Summer (DST): UTC+4:30 (IRDT)

Azarsi-ye Hoseyn Khanzadeh (Persian: ازارسي حسين خان زاده, also Romanized as Āzārsī-ye Ḩoseyn Khānzādeh) is a village that is located in the Deraz Kola Rural District of Babol Kenar District, in Babol County, in the Mazandaran Province of Iran. At the 2006 census, its population was 20, in 4 families.
