= Surat, Iran =

Village in Mazandaran province, Iran

Surat Persian: صورت
- Village
- Location within Iran
- Coordinates: 36°22′52″N 52°38′45″E
- Country: Iran
- Province: Mazandaran
- County: Babol
- District: Bandpey-e Sharqi
- Rural District: Sajjadrud

Population (2016)
  - Total: 1,034
- Time zone: UTC+3:30 (IRST)

Surat (Persian: صورت) (Note: Also romanized as Şūrat) is a village in Sajjadrud Rural District of Bandpey-e Sharqi District in Babol County, Mazandaran province, Iran.

== Demographics ==
=== Population ===
At the time of the 2006 National Census, the village's population was 1,013 in 276 households. The following census in 2011 counted 1,079 people in 315 households. The 2016 census measured the population of the village as 1,034 people in 350 households.
