= Kord Mahalleh, Babol =

Village in Mazandaran province, Iran

Kord Mahalleh Persian: كردمحله
- Village
- Location within Iran
- Coordinates: 36°23′14″N 52°39′49″E
- Country: Iran
- Province: Mazandaran
- County: Babol
- District: Bandpey-e Sharqi
- Rural District: Sajjadrud

Population (2016)
  - Total: 686
- Time zone: UTC+3:30 (IRST)

Kord Mahalleh (Persian: كردمحله) (Note: Also romanized as Kord Maḩalleh) is a village in Sajjadrud Rural District of Bandpey-e Sharqi District in Babol County, Mazandaran province, Iran.

== Demographics ==
=== Population ===
At the time of the 2006 National Census, the village's population was 679 in 175 households. The following census in 2011 counted 727 people in 210 households. The 2016 census measured the population of the village as 686 people in 223 households.
