= Khvajeh Kola, Bandpey-ye Sharqi =

Khvajeh Kola خواجه كلا
- Village
- Location within Iran
- Coordinates: 36°13′32″N 52°38′55″E
- Country: Iran
- Province: Mazandaran
- County: Babol
- Bakhsh: Bandpey-ye Sharqi
- Rural District: Firuzjah

Population (2006)
  - Total: 97
- Time zone: UTC+3:30 (IRST)
  - Summer (DST): UTC+4:30 (IRDT)

Khvajeh Kola (Persian: خواجه كلا, also Romanized as Khvājeh Kolā and Khvājeh Kalā; also known as Khājeh Kalā) is a village in Firuzjah Rural District, Bandpey-ye Sharqi District, Babol County, Mazandaran Province, Iran. At the 2006 census, its population was 97, in 27 families.
