= Galugah, Babol =

City in Mazandaran province, Iran

Galugah Persian: گلوگاه
- City
- Location within Iran
- Coordinates: 36°18′28″N 52°37′33″E
- Country: Iran
- Province: Mazandaran
- County: Babol
- District: Bandpey-e Sharqi

Population (2016)
  - Total: 6,908
- Time zone: UTC+3:30 (IRST)

Galugah (Persian: گلوگاه) (Note: Also romanized as Galūgāh; Mazandarani: گلیا)) is a city in, and the capital of, Bandpey-e Sharqi District in Babol County, Mazandaran province, Iran. It also serves as the administrative center for Sajjadrud Rural District.

== Demographics ==
=== Population ===
At the time of the 2006 National Census, the city's population was 2,512 in 644 households. The following census in 2011 counted 2,643 people in 733 households. The 2016 census measured the population of the city as 6,908 people in 2,138 households.
