= Narivaran-e Sharqi =

Village in Mazandaran province, Iran

Narivaran-e Sharqi Persian: ناريوران شرقي
- Village
- Location within Iran
- Coordinates: 36°21′28″N 52°38′49″E
- Country: Iran
- Province: Mazandaran
- County: Babol
- District: Bandpey-e Sharqi
- Rural District: Sajjadrud

Population (2016)
  - Total: 1,312
- Time zone: UTC+3:30 (IRST)

Narivaran-e Sharqi (Persian: ناريوران شرقي) (Note: Also romanized as Nārīvarān-e Sharqī) is a village in Sajjadrud Rural District of Bandpey-e Sharqi District in Babol County, Mazandaran province, Iran.

== Demographics ==
=== Population ===
At the time of the 2006 National Census, the village's population was 1,155 in 280 households. The following census in 2011 counted 1,275 people in 351 households. The 2016 census measured the population of the village as 1,312 people in 404 households. It was the most populous village in its rural district.
