= Chaybagh Rural District =

Rural district in Mazandaran province, Iran

Chaybagh Rural District Persian: دهستان چایباغ
- Rural District
- Location within Iran
- Coordinates: 36°20′N 52°57′E
- Country: Iran
- Province: Mazandaran
- County: North Savadkuh
- District: Narenjestan
- Established: 2013
- Capital: Chaybagh

Population (2016)
  - Total: 3,395
- Time zone: UTC+3:30 (IRST)

Chaybagh Rural District (Persian: دهستان چایباغ) is in Narenjestan District of North Savadkuh County, Mazandaran province, Iran. Its capital is the village of Chaybagh. (Note: Formerly Malafeh)

== History ==
In 2013, Shirgah District was separated from Savadkuh County in the establishment of North Savadkuh County, and Chaybagh Rural District was created in the new Narenjestan District.

== Demographics ==
=== Population ===
At the time of the 2016 National Census, the rural district's population was 3,395 in 1,140 households. The most populous of its 12 settlements was Chaybagh, with 870 people.

=== Other villages in the rural district ===
- Berenjestanak
- Beshel
- Chak Sar
- Mehdiabad
- Rezaabad
- Shahid Yunesi Bakhtun Kola Garrison
- Yagh Kuh
