= Azarsi-ye Babol Kenar =

Village in Mazandaran province, Iran

Azarsi-ye Babol Kenar Persian: ازارسي بابل كنار
- Village
- Location within Iran
- Coordinates: 36°21′50″N 52°41′50″E
- Country: Iran
- Province: Mazandaran
- County: Babol
- District: Babol Kenar
- Rural District: Deraz Kola

Population (2016)
  - Total: 343
- Time zone: UTC+3:30 (IRST)

Azarsi-ye Babol Kenar (Persian: ازارسي بابل كنار) (Note: Also romanized as Āzārsī-ye Bābol Kenār) is a village in Deraz Kola Rural District of Babol Kenar District in Babol County, Mazandaran province, Iran.

== Demographics ==
=== Population ===
At the time of the 2006 National Census, the village's population was 219 in 50 households. The following census in 2011 counted 185 people in 50 households. The 2016 census measured the population of the village as 343 people in 105 households.
