= Mamerz Kan =

Village in Mazandaran province, Iran

Mamerz Kan Persian: ممرزكن
- Village
- Country: Iran
- Province: Mazandaran
- County: Babol
- District: Babol Kenar
- Rural District: Deraz Kola

Population (2016)
  - Total: 297
- Time zone: UTC+3:30 (IRST)

Mamerz Kan (Persian: ممرزكن) is a village in Deraz Kola Rural District of Babol Kenar District in Babol County, Mazandaran province, Iran.

== Demographics ==
=== Population ===
At the time of the 2006 National Census, the village's population was 192 in 54 households. The following census in 2011 counted 240 people in 74 households. The 2016 census measured the population of the village as 297 people in 95 households.
