= Bala Ganj Afruz =

Village in Mazandaran province, Iran

Bala Ganj Afruz Persian: بالاگنج افروز
- Village
- Location within Iran
- Coordinates: 36°25′12″N 52°42′01″E
- Country: Iran
- Province: Mazandaran
- County: Babol
- District: Babol Kenar
- Rural District: Babol Kenar

Population (2016)
  - Total: 408
- Time zone: UTC+3:30 (IRST)

Bala Ganj Afruz (Persian: بالاگنج افروز) (Note: Also romanized as Bālā Ganj Afrūz) is a village in Babol Kenar Rural District of Babol Kenar District in Babol County, Mazandaran province, Iran.

== Demographics ==
=== Population ===
At the time of the 2006 National Census, the village's population was 481 in 118 households. The following census in 2011 counted 454 people in 140 households. The 2016 census measured the population of the village as 408 people in 139 households.
