= Rais Kola, Babol =

Village in Mazandaran province, Iran

Rais Kola Persian: رييس كلا
- Village
- Location within Iran
- Coordinates: 36°22′14″N 52°43′49″E
- Country: Iran
- Province: Mazandaran
- County: Babol
- District: Babol Kenar
- Rural District: Babol Kenar

Population (2016)
  - Total: 687
- Time zone: UTC+3:30 (IRST)

Rais Kola (Persian: رييس كلا) (Note: Also romanized as Ra’īs Kolā) is a village in Babol Kenar Rural District of Babol Kenar District in Babol County, Mazandaran province, Iran.

== Demographics ==
=== Population ===
At the time of the 2006 National Census, the village's population was 678 in 167 households. The following census in 2011 counted 642 people in 193 households. The 2016 census measured the population of the village as 687 people in 219 households.
