= Kola Gar Sara, Babol =

Village in Mazandaran province, Iran

Kola Gar Sara Persian: كلاگرسرا
- Village
- Location within Iran
- Coordinates: 36°13′18″N 52°41′01″E
- Country: Iran
- Province: Mazandaran
- County: Babol
- District: Bandpey-e Sharqi
- Rural District: Firuzjah

Population (2016)
  - Total: 122
- Time zone: UTC+3:30 (IRST)

Kola Gar Sara (Persian: كلاگرسرا) (Note: Also romanized as Kolā Gar Sarā) is a village in Firuzjah Rural District of Bandpey-e Sharqi District in Babol County, Mazandaran province, Iran.

== Demographics ==
=== Population ===
At the time of the 2006 National Census, the village's population was 116 in 27 households. The following census in 2011 counted 147 people in 37 households. The 2016 census measured the population of the village as 122 people in 41 households.
