= Ahmad Kola =

Village in Mazandaran province, Iran

Ahmad Kola Persian: احمدكلا
- Village
- Location within Iran
- Coordinates: 36°22′25″N 52°39′20″E
- Country: Iran
- Province: Mazandaran
- County: Babol
- District: Country side of Babolsr
- Rural District: Babolsar

Population (2016)
  - Total: 783
- Time zone: UTC+3:30 (IRST)

Ahmad Kola (Persian: احمدكلا) (Note: Also romanized as Aḩmad Kolā) is a village in Babolsar of Bandpey-e Sharqi District in Babol County, Mazandaran province, Iran.

== Demographics ==
=== Population ===
At the time of the 2006 National Census, the village's population was 920 in 217 households. The following census in 2011 counted 867 people in 220 households. The 2016 census measured the population of the village as 783 people in 221 households.
