= Darun Kola-ye Gharbi =

Village in Mazandaran province, Iran

Darun Kola-ye Gharbi Persian: درونكلاغربي
- Village
- Location within Iran
- Coordinates: 36°23′08″N 52°42′36″E
- Country: Iran
- Province: Mazandaran
- County: Babol
- District: Babol Kenar
- Rural District: Babol Kenar

Population (2016)
  - Total: 1,060
- Time zone: UTC+3:30 (IRST)

Darun Kola-ye Gharbi (Persian: درونكلاغربي) (Note: Also romanized as Darūn Kolā-ye Gharbī; also known as Darūn Kalā and Darūn Kolā) is a village in Babol Kenar Rural District of Babol Kenar District in Babol County, Mazandaran province, Iran.

== Demographics ==
=== Population ===
At the time of the 2006 National Census, the village's population was 1,057 in 271 households. The following census in 2011 counted 1,014 people in 319 households. The 2016 census measured the population of the village as 1,060 people in 352 households.
