= Darun Kola-ye Sharqi =

Village in Mazandaran province, Iran

Darun Kola-ye Sharqi Persian: درونكلاشرقي
- Village
- Location within Iran
- Coordinates: 36°23′17″N 52°43′43″E
- Country: Iran
- Province: Mazandaran
- County: Babol
- District: Babol Kenar
- Rural District: Babol Kenar

Population (2016)
  - Total: 1,781
- Time zone: UTC+3:30 (IRST)

Darun Kola-ye Sharqi (Persian: درونكلاشرقي) (Note: Also romanized as Darūn Kalā Sharqī, Darūn Kolā Sharqī, and Darūn Kolā-ye Sharqī) is a village in Babol Kenar Rural District of Babol Kenar District in Babol County, Mazandaran province, Iran.

== Demographics ==
=== Population ===
At the time of the 2006 National Census, the village's population was 2,007 in 551 households. The following census in 2011 counted 1,808 people in 570 households. The 2016 census measured the population of the village as 1,781 people in 627 households. It was the most populous village in its rural district.
