= Khalil Kola, Bandpey-e Sharqi =

Village in Mazandaran province, Iran

Khalil Kola Persian: خليل كلا
- Village
- Location within Iran
- Coordinates: 36°13′44″N 52°41′40″E
- Country: Iran
- Province: Mazandaran
- County: Babol
- District: Bandpey-e Sharqi
- Rural District: Firuzjah

Population (2016)
  - Total: 202
- Time zone: UTC+3:30 (IRST)

Khalil Kola (Persian: خليل كلا) (Note: Also romanized as Khalīl Kalā and Khalīl Kolā) is a village in Firuzjah Rural District of Bandpey-e Sharqi District in Babol County, Mazandaran province, Iran.

== Demographics ==
=== Population ===
At the time of the 2006 National Census, the village's population was 174 in 52 households. The following census in 2011 counted 174 people in 59 households. The 2016 census measured the population of the village as 202 people in 75 households.
