= Kari Kola, Babol =

Village in Mazandaran province, Iran

Kari Kola Persian: كريكلا
- Village
- Location within Iran
- Coordinates: 36°21′49″N 52°43′03″E
- Country: Iran
- Province: Mazandaran
- County: Babol
- District: Babol Kenar
- Rural District: Deraz Kola

Population (2016)
  - Total: 651
- Time zone: UTC+3:30 (IRST)

Kari Kola (Persian: كريكلا) (Note: Also romanized as Karī Kolā; also known as Kolārī Kalā and Kolārī Kolā) is a village in Deraz Kola Rural District of Babol Kenar District in Babol County, Mazandaran province, Iran.

== Demographics ==
=== Population ===
At the time of the 2006 National Census, the village's population was 617 in 168 households. The following census in 2011 counted 660 people in 200 households. The 2016 census measured the population of the village as 651 people in 233 households.
