= Ganj Kola-ye Pain =

Village in Mazandaran province, Iran

Ganj Kola-ye Pain Persian: گنج كلاپائين
- Village
- Location within Iran
- Coordinates: 36°19′44″N 52°37′30″E
- Country: Iran
- Province: Mazandaran
- County: Babol
- District: Bandpey-e Sharqi
- Rural District: Sajjadrud

Population (2016)
  - Total: 839
- Time zone: UTC+3:30 (IRST)

Ganj Kola-ye Pain (Persian: گنج كلاپائين) (Note: Also romanized as Ganj Kolā-ye Pā’īn; also known as Pā’īn Ganjkolāh) is a village in Sajjadrud Rural District of Bandpey-e Sharqi District in Babol County, Mazandaran province, Iran.

== Demographics ==
=== Population ===
At the time of the 2006 National Census, the village's population was 854 in 199 households. The following census in 2011 counted 880 people in 247 households. The 2016 census measured the population of the village as 839 people in 267 households.
