= Gavan Kola, Babol Kenar =

Village in Mazandaran province, Iran

Gavan Kola Persian: گاوانكلا
- Village
- Location within Iran
- Coordinates: 36°19′43″N 52°46′38″E
- Country: Iran
- Province: Mazandaran
- County: Babol
- District: Babol Kenar
- Rural District: Babol Kenar

Population (2016)
  - Total: 1,190
- Time zone: UTC+3:30 (IRST)

Gavan Kola (Persian: گاوانكلا) (Note: Also romanized as Gāvān Kalā and Gāvān Kolā) is a village in Babol Kenar Rural District of Babol Kenar District in Babol County, Mazandaran province, Iran.

== Demographics ==
=== Population ===
At the time of the 2006 National Census, the village's population was 1,311 in 357 households. The following census in 2011 counted 1,266 people in 402 households. The 2016 census measured the population of the village as 1,190 people in 420 households.
