= Manqal =

Manqal منقل
- Village
- Location within Iran
- Coordinates: 28°31′28″N 51°24′46″E
- Country: Iran
- Province: Bushehr
- County: Dashti
- Bakhsh: Central
- Rural District: Markazi

Population (2006)
  - Total: 10
- Time zone: UTC+3:30 (IRST)
  - Summer (DST): UTC+4:30 (IRDT)

Manqal (Persian: منقل; also known as Mangol) is a village in Markazi Rural District, in the Central District of Dashti County, Bushehr Province, Iran. At the 2006 census, its population was 10, in 4 families.
