= Mingol =

Mingol مينگل
- Village
- Location within Iran
- Coordinates: 37°55′34″N 44°44′21″E
- Country: Iran
- Province: West Azerbaijan
- County: Urmia
- Bakhsh: Sumay-ye Beradust
- Rural District: Sumay-ye Shomali

Population (2006)
  - Total: 315
- Time zone: UTC+3:30 (IRST)
  - Summer (DST): UTC+4:30 (IRDT)

Mingol (Persian: مينگل, also Romanized as Mīngol; also known as Mangol, Mangowl, Mengowl, and Mingul) is a village in Sumay-ye Shomali Rural District, Sumay-ye Beradust District, Urmia County, West Azerbaijan Province, Iran. At the 2006 census, its population was 315, in 55 families.
