= Khalil Kola, Lalehabad =

Khalil Kola خليل كلا
- Village
- Location within Iran
- Coordinates: 36°30′42″N 52°34′18″E
- Country: Iran
- Province: Mazandaran
- County: Babol
- Bakhsh: Lalehabad
- Rural District: Karipey

Population (2006)
  - Total: 559
- Time zone: UTC+3:30 (IRST)
  - Summer (DST): UTC+4:30 (IRDT)

Khalil Kola (Persian: خليل كلا, also Romanized as Khalīl Kolā and Khalīl Kalā; also known as Khalīl Kūlā) is a village in Karipey Rural District, Lalehabad District, Babol County, Mazandaran Province, Iran. At the 2006 census, its population was 559, in 154 families.
