= Azarsi, Bandpey-ye Gharbi =

Coordinates: 36°21′34″N 52°41′47″E

Azarsi ازارسي
- Village
- Interactive map of Azarsi
- Country: Iran
- Province: Mazandaran
- County: Babol
- Bakhsh: Bandpey-ye Gharbi
- Rural District: Khvosh Rud

Population (2006)
  - Total: 64
- Time zone: UTC+3:30 (IRST)
  - Summer (DST): UTC+4:30 (IRDT)

Azarsi (Persian: ازارسي, also Romanized as Āzārsī) is a village in Khvosh Rud Rural District, Bandpey-ye Gharbi District, Babol County, Mazandaran Province, Iran. At the 2006 census, its population was 64, in 16 families.
