= Marzikola =

City in Mazandaran province, Iran

Marzikola Persian: مرزيكلا
- City
- Location within Iran
- Coordinates: 36°21′47″N 52°44′05″E
- Country: Iran
- Province: Mazandaran
- County: Babol
- District: Babol Kenar

Population (2016)
  - Total: 868
- Time zone: UTC+3:30 (IRST)

Marzikola (Persian: مرزيكلا) (Note: Also romanized as Marzī Kalā, Marzī Kolā, and Marzīkolā) is a city in, and the capital of, Babol Kenar District in Babol County, Mazandaran province, Iran. It also serves as the administrative center for Babol Kenar Rural District.

== Demographics ==
=== Population ===
At the time of the 2006 National Census, the city's population was 525 in 141 households. The following census in 2011 counted 555 people in 178 households. The 2016 census measured the population of the city as 868 people in 301 households.
