= Lafur Rural District =

Rural district in Mazandaran province, Iran

Lafur Rural District Persian: دهستان لفور
- Rural District
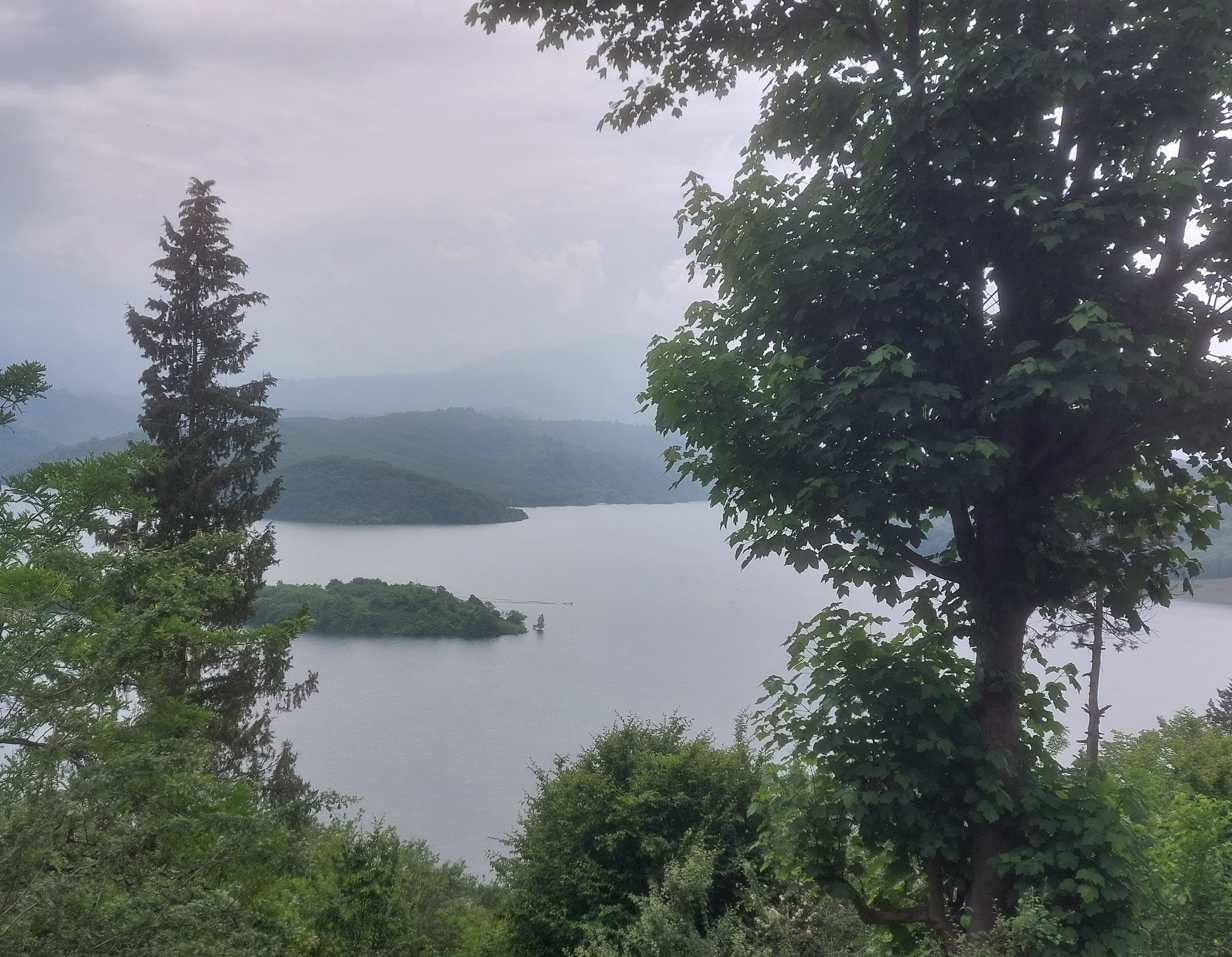
- Alborz (Lafur) Dam and nearby forests

- Location within Iran
- Coordinates: 36°13′N 52°49′E
- Country: Iran
- Province: Mazandaran
- County: North Savadkuh
- District: Central
- Established: 1987
- Capital: Sharqelet

Population (2016)
  - Total: 4,959
- Time zone: UTC+3:30 (IRST)

Lafur Rural District (Persian: دهستان لفور) is in the Central District of North Savadkuh County, Mazandaran province, Iran. Its capital is the village of Sharqelet.

== Demographics ==
=== Population ===
At the time of the 2006 National Census, the rural district's population (as a part of the former Shirgah District in Savadkuh County) was 4,826 in 1,427 households. There were 4,493 inhabitants in 1,483 households at the following census of 2011. The 2016 census measured the population of the rural district as 4,959 in 1,808 households, by which time the district had been separated from the county in the establishment of North Savadkuh County. The rural district was transferred to the new Central District. The most populous of its 28 villages was Kali Kola, with 850 people.

=== Other villages in the rural district ===
- Alem Kola
- Bur Khani
- Emam Kola
- Galesh Kola
- Naft Chal
- Rais Kola

== Natural sights ==
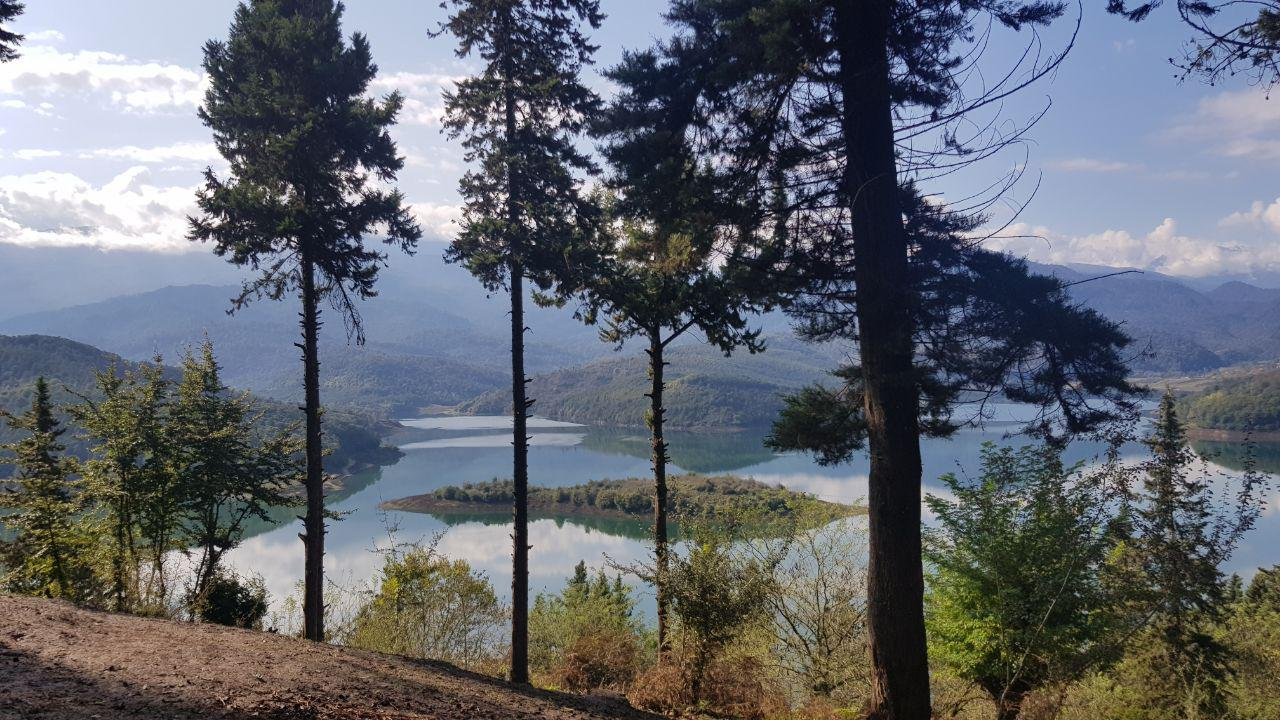
View of Lafur Alborz Dam from Azarrud Park

Lafur rural district is known for the Alborz Dam and its reservoir, known as Lafur Dam, inside the Hyrcanian forests on the Babolrud river.
