= Babol Kenar Rural District =

Rural district in Mazandaran province, Iran

Babol Kenar Rural District دهستان بابل‌کنار
- Rural District
- Location within Iran
- Coordinates: 36°23′N 52°44′E
- Country: Iran
- Province: Mazandaran
- County: Babol
- District: Babol Kenar
- Established: 1987
- Capital: Marzikola

Population (2016)
  - Total: 15,815
- Time zone: UTC+3:30 (IRST)

Babol Kenar Rural District (Persian: دهستان بابل‌کنار) is in Babol Kenar District of Babol County, Mazandaran province, Iran. It is administered from the city of Marzikola.

== Demographics ==
=== Population ===
At the time of the 2006 National Census, the rural district's population was 16,990 in 4,491 households. There were 16,515 inhabitants in 5,231 households at the following census of 2011. The 2016 census measured the population of the rural district as 15,815 in 5,449 households. The most populous of its 26 villages was Darun Kola-ye Sharqi, with 1,781 people.

=== Other villages in the rural district ===
- Anarestan
- Bala Ganj Afruz
- Chehreh
- Dardekasht
- Darun Kola-ye Gharbi
- Fulad Kola
- Gavan Kola
- Halidasht
- Rais Kola
- Seyyed Kola
- Shah Reza Gavzan Mahalleh
- Shir Dar Kola
- Siah Darka
- Talvat
