= Firuzjah Rural District =

Rural district in Mazandaran province, Iran

Firuzjah Rural District Persian: دهستان فيروزجاه
- Rural District
- Location within Iran
- Coordinates: 36°06′N 52°38′E
- Country: Iran
- Province: Mazandaran
- County: Babol
- District: Bandpey-e Sharqi
- Established: 1987
- Capital: Firuz Ja-ye Sabet

Population (2016)
  - Total: 2,600
- Time zone: UTC+3:30 (IRST)

Firuzjah Rural District (Persian: دهستان فيروزجاه) is in Bandpey-e Sharqi District of Babol County, Mazandaran province, Iran. Its capital is the village of Firuz Ja-ye Sabet.

== Demographics ==
=== Population ===
At the time of the 2006 National Census, the rural district's population was 3,201 in 861 households. There were 3,019 inhabitants in 858 households at the following census of 2011. The 2016 census measured the population of the rural district as 2,600 in 865 households. The most populous of its 159 villages was Firuz Ja-ye Sabet, with 275 people.

== Geography ==
The district spans the biodiverse Caspian Hyrcanian mixed forests ecoregion, and a species of species of Tarphius ironclad beetle was first described there.

=== Other villages in the rural district ===
- Ari
- Gavzan Mahalleh
- Khalil Kola
- Kola Gar Sara
- Sama Gush Mahalleh
- Sarjah Kola
- Vatileh
