= Deraz Kola Rural District =

Rural district in Mazandaran province, Iran

Deraz Kola Rural District Persian: دهستان درازكلا
- Rural District
- Location within Iran
- Coordinates: 36°17′N 52°44′E
- Country: Iran
- Province: Mazandaran
- County: Babol
- District: Babol Kenar
- Established: 1997
- Capital: Deraz Kola

Population (2016)
  - Total: 8,487
- Time zone: UTC+3:30 (IRST)

Deraz Kola Rural District (Persian: دهستان درازكلا) is in Babol Kenar District of Babol County, Mazandaran province, Iran. Its capital is the village of Deraz Kola.

== Demographics ==
=== Population ===
At the time of the 2006 National Census, the rural district's population was 7,431 in 2,136 households. There were 7,999 inhabitants in 2,635 households at the following census of 2011. The 2016 census measured the population of the rural district as 8,487 in 2,942 households. The most populous of its 44 villages was Kebria Kola, with 1,925 people.

=== Other villages in the rural district ===
- Amir Kola
- Azarsi-ye Babol Kenar
- Hali Khal
- Kardar Kola
- Kari Kola
- Mamerz Kan
- Tirkan
