= Narenjestan District =

District in Mazandaran province, Iran

Narenjestan District Persian: بخش نارنجستان
- District
- Location within Iran
- Coordinates: 36°21′N 52°56′E
- Country: Iran
- Province: Mazandaran
- County: North Savadkuh
- Established: 2013
- Capital: Chaybagh

Population (2016)
  - Total: 7,016
- Time zone: UTC+3:30 (IRST)

Narenjestan District (Persian: بخش نارنجستان) is in North Savadkuh County, Mazandaran province, Iran. Its capital is the village of Chaybagh. (Note: Formerly Malafeh)

== History ==
In 2013, Shirgah District was separated from Savadkuh County in the establishment of North Savadkuh County, which was divided into two districts of two rural districts each, with Shirgah as its capital and only city at the time.

== Demographics ==
=== Population ===
At the time of the 2016 National Census, the district's population was 7,016 inhabitants in 2,389 households.

=== Administrative divisions ===
Narenjestan District Population
Administrative Divisions	2016
Chaybagh RD	3,395
Hatkeh RD	3,621
Total	7,016
RD = Rural District
