= Sharq va Gharb-e Shirgah Rural District =

Rural district in Mazandaran province, Iran

Sharq va Gharb-e Shirgah Rural District Persian: دهستان شرق وغرب شيرگاه
- Rural District
- Location within Iran
- Coordinates: 36°17′N 52°53′E
- Country: Iran
- Province: Mazandaran
- County: North Savadkuh
- District: Central
- Established: 1987
- Capital: Kalij Kheyl

Population (2016)
  - Total: 4,188
- Time zone: UTC+3:30 (IRST)

Sharq va Gharb-e Shirgah Rural District (Persian: دهستان شرق وغرب شيرگاه) is in the Central District of North Savadkuh County, Mazandaran province, Iran. Its capital is the village of Kalij Kheyl.

== Demographics ==
=== Population ===
At the time of the 2006 National Census, the rural district's population (as a part of the former Shirgah District of Savadkuh County) was 10,396 in 2,826 households. There were 10,787 inhabitants in 3,061 households at the following census of 2011. The 2016 census measured the population of the rural district as 4,188 in 1,410 households, by which time the district had been separated from the county in the establishment of North Savadkuh County. The rural district was transferred to the new Central District. The most populous of its nine villages was Kalij Kheyl, with 1,562 people.

=== Other villages in the rural district ===
- Ab Dang Sar
- Ahangar Kola
- Chali
- Eslamabad
- Nowabad
- Shirjeh Kola
- Tappeh Sar
