= Sajjadrud Rural District =

Rural district in Mazandaran province, Iran

Sajjadrud Rural District Persian: دهستان سجادرود
- Rural District
- Location within Iran
- Coordinates: 36°18′N 52°39′E
- Country: Iran
- Province: Mazandaran
- County: Babol
- District: Bandpey-e Sharqi
- Established: 1987
- Capital: Galugah

Population (2016)
  - Total: 25,724
- Time zone: UTC+3:30 (IRST)

Sajjadrud Rural District (Persian: دهستان سجادرود) is in Bandpey-e Sharqi District of Babol County, Mazandaran province, Iran. It is administered from the city of Galugah.

== Demographics ==
=== Population ===
At the time of the 2006 National Census, the rural district's population was 26,809 in 6,738 households. There were 27,846 inhabitants in 7,900 households at the following census of 2011. The 2016 census measured the population of the rural district as 25,724 in 8,298 households. The most populous of its 169 villages was Narivaran-e Sharqi, with 1,312 people.

=== Other villages in the rural district ===
- Ahmad Kola
- Edmola
- Firuzabad
- Ganj Kola-ye Pain
- Gord Rudbar
- Kashi Kola
- Kord Mahalleh
- Ledar
- Pust Kola
- Surat
- Tahamtan Kola
- Tashun
- Zavar Deh
