= Central District (North Savadkuh County) =

District in Mazandaran province, Iran

Central District (North Savadkuh County) Persian: بخش مرکزی شهرستان سوادکوه شمالی
- District
- Location within Iran
- Coordinates: 36°18′N 52°53′E
- Country: Iran
- Province: Mazandaran
- County: North Savadkuh
- Established: 2013
- Capital: Shirgah

Population (2016)
  - Total: 17,818
- Time zone: UTC+3:30 (IRST)

The Central District of North Savadkuh County (Persian: بخش مرکزی شهرستان سوادکوه شمالی) is in Mazandaran province, Iran. Its capital is the city of Shirgah.

== History ==
In 2013, Shirgah District was separated from Savadkuh County in the establishment of North Savadkuh County, which was divided into two districts of two rural districts each, with Shirgah as its capital and only city at the time.

== Demographics ==
=== Population ===
At the time of the 2016 National Census, the district's population was 17,818 inhabitants in 6,087 households.

=== Administrative divisions ===
Central District (North Savadkuh County) Population
Administrative Divisions	2016
Lafur RD	4,959
Sharq va Gharb-e Shirgah RD	4,188
Shirgah (city)	8,671
Total	17,818
RD = Rural District
