= North Savadkuh County =

County in Mazandaran province, Iran

North Savadkuh County Persian: شهرستان سوادکوه شمالی
- County
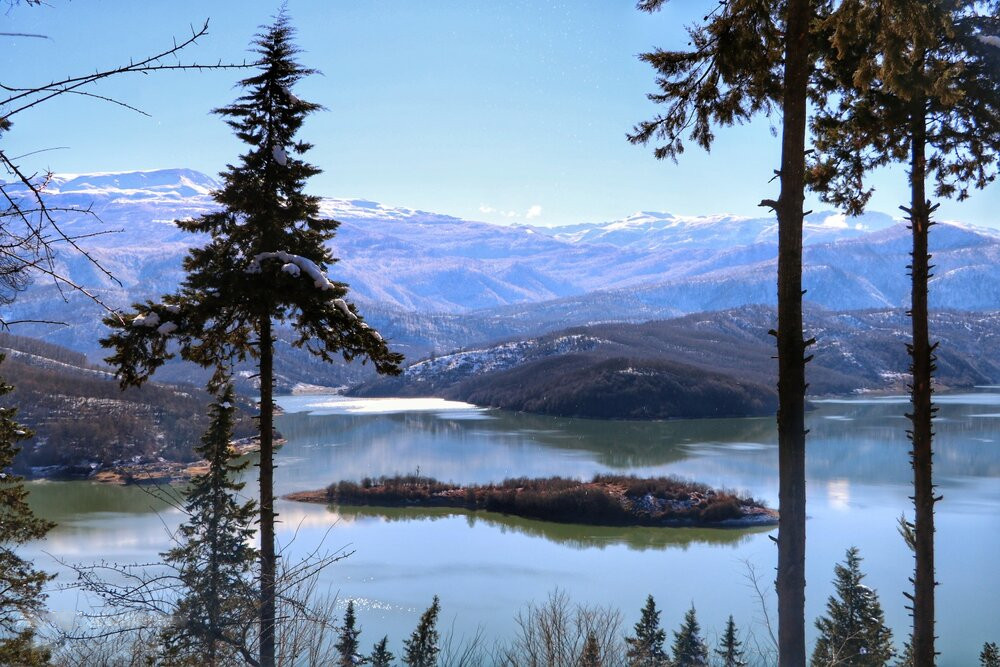
- Snowy face of Alborz Dam

- Location of North Savadkuh County in Mazandaran province (center right, pink)

- Location of Mazandaran province in Iran
- Coordinates: 36°19′N 52°56′E
- Country: Iran
- Province: Mazandaran
- Established: 2013
- Capital: Shirgah
- Districts: Central, Narenjestan

Population (2016)
  - Total: 24,834
- Time zone: UTC+3:30 (IRST)

North Savadkuh County (Persian: شهرستان سوادکوه شمالی) is in Mazandaran province, Iran. Its capital is the city of Shirgah.

== History ==
In 2013, Shirgah District was separated from Savadkuh County in the establishment of North Savadkuh County, which was divided into two districts of two rural districts each, with Shirgah as its capital and only city at the time.

== Demographics ==
=== Population ===
At the time of the 2016 National Census, the county's population was 24,834 in 8,476 households.

=== Administrative divisions ===
North Savadkuh County's population and administrative structure are shown in the following table.

North Savadkuh County Population
Administrative Divisions	2016
Central District	17,818
Lafur RD	4,959
Sharq va Gharb-e Shirgah RD	4,188
Shirgah (city)	8,671
Narenjestan District	7,016
Chaybagh RD	3,395
Hatkeh RD	3,621
Total	24,834
RD = Rural District

== See also ==
Media related to North Savadkuh County at Wikimedia Commons
