= Shirgah District =

Former district in Mazandaran province, Iran

Shirgah District Persian: بخش شيرگاه
- Former District
- Location within Iran
- Coordinates: 36°19′N 52°56′E
- Country: Iran
- Province: Mazandaran
- County: Savadkuh
- Capital: Shirgah

Population (2011)
  - Total: 23,409
- Time zone: UTC+3:30 (IRST)

Shirgah District (Persian: بخش شيرگاه) is a former administrative division of Savadkuh County, Mazandaran province, Iran. Its capital was the city of Shirgah.

== History ==
2013, the district was separated from the county in the establishment of North Savadkuh County.

== Demographics ==
=== Population ===
At the time of the 2006 National Census, the district's population was 23,751 in 6,522 households. The following census in 2011 counted 23,409 people in 6,983 households.

=== Administrative divisions ===
Shirgah District Population
Administrative Divisions	2006	2011
Lafur RD	4,826	4,493
Sharq va Gharb-e Shirgah RD	10,396	10,787
Shirgah (city)	8,529	8,129
Total	23,751	23,409
RD = Rural District
