= Babol Kenar District =

District in Mazandaran province, Iran

Babol Kenar District بخش بابل‌کنار
- District
- Location within Iran
- Coordinates: 36°20′N 52°44′E
- Country: Iran
- Province: Mazandaran
- County: Babol
- Established: 1997
- Capital: Marzikola

Population (2016)
  - Total: 25,170
- Time zone: UTC+3:30 (IRST)

Babol Kenar District (Persian: بخش بابل‌کنار) is in Babol County, Mazandaran province, Iran. Its capital is the city of Marzikola.

== Demographics ==
=== Population ===
At the time of the 2006 National Census, the district's population was 24,946 in 6,768 households. The following census in 2011 counted 25,069 people in 8,044 households. The 2016 census measured the population of the district as 25,170 inhabitants in 8,694 households.

=== Administrative divisions ===
Babol Kenar District Population
Administrative Divisions	2006	2011	2016
Babol Kenar RD	16,990	16,515	15,815
Deraz Kola RD	7,431	7,999	8,487
Marzikola (city)	525	555	868
Total	24,946	25,069	25,170
RD = Rural District
