= Bandpey-e Sharqi District =

District in Mazandaran province, Iran

Bandpey-e Sharqi District Persian: بخش بندپی شرقی
- District
- Location within Iran
- Coordinates: 36°10′N 52°38′E
- Country: Iran
- Province: Mazandaran
- County: Babol
- Established: 1991
- Capital: Galugah

Population (2016)
  - Total: 35,232
- Time zone: UTC+3:30 (IRST)

Bandpey-e Sharqi District (Persian: بخش بندپی شرقی) is in Babol County, Mazandaran province, Iran. Its capital is the city of Galugah.

== Demographics ==
=== Population ===
At the time of the 2006 National Census, the district's population was 32,522 in 8,243 households. The following census in 2011 counted 33,508 people in 9,491 households. The 2016 census measured the population of the district as 35,232 inhabitants in 11,301 households.

=== Administrative divisions ===
Bandpey-e Sharqi District Population
Administrative Divisions	2006	2011	2016
Firuzjah RD	3,201	3,019	2,600
Sajjadrud RD	26,809	27,846	25,724
Galugah (city)	2,512	2,643	6,908
Total	32,522	33,508	35,232
RD = Rural District
