= Darzi Kola =

Darzi Kola or Darzikola or Darzi Kala (Persian: درزيكلا), also rendered as Darzi Kula, may refer to:

- Darzi Kola, Amol
- Darzi Kola-ye Aqa Shafi, Babol County
- Darzi Kola-ye Bozorg, Babol County
- Darzi Kola-ye Karim Kola, Babol County
- Darzi Kola-ye Kuchek, Babol County
- Darzikola-ye Akhund-e Baba, Babol County
- Darzikola-ye Akhundi-ye Bala, Babol County
- Darzikola-ye Akhundi-ye Pain, Babol County
- Darzikola-ye Nasirai, Babol County
- Darzikola-ye Navshirvan, Babol County
- Darzi Kola, Neka
- Darzi Kola, Nowshahr
- Darzi Kola, Sari
- Darzi Kola, Savadkuh
