= Shamshir Mahalleh =

Shamshir Mahalleh شمشيرمحله
- Village
- Interactive map of Shamshir Mahalleh
- Coordinates: 36.586°N 52.666°E
- Country: Iran
- Province: Mazandaran
- County: Babol
- Bakhsh: Central
- Rural District: Feyziyeh

Population (2016)
  - Total: 276
- Time zone: UTC+3:30 (IRST)

Shamshir Mahalleh (Persian: شمشيرمحله, also Romanized as Shamshīr Maḩalleh) is a village in Feyziyeh Rural District, in the Central District of Babol County, Mazandaran Province, Iran. It is a suburban village between Babol and Amirkola cities west of Babolrud river, with Barik Kola village just to its west.

At the time of the 2006 National Census, the village's population was 226 in 61 households. The following census in 2011 counted 246 people in 73 households. The 2016 census measured the population of the village as 276 people in 93 households.
