= Khatibi (surname) =

Khatibi (Arabic: الخطيبي, Persian: خطیبی) or Khatib is a surname. Notable people with the surname include: :

- Abdelkebir Khatibi (1938–2009), Moroccan literary critic, novelist and playwright
- Amin Khatibi (born 1997), Iranian footballer
- Hossein Khatibi (born 1975), former Iranian footballer
- Rasoul Khatibi (born 1978), Iranian football retired player and coach
- Reza Khatibi (born 1969), Iranian filmmaker
- Sanam Khatibi (born 1979), Belgian artist

== See also ==
- Khatibi, village in South Khorasan Province, Iran
- Khatib (disambiguation)
- Katib
