= Garmich =

Garmich گرميچ
- Village
- Location within Iran
- Coordinates: 36°29′35″N 52°34′46″E
- Country: Iran
- Province: Mazandaran
- County: Babol
- Bakhsh: Lalehabad
- Rural District: Lalehabad

Population (2006)
  - Total: 271
- Time zone: UTC+3:30 (IRST)
  - Summer (DST): UTC+4:30 (IRDT)

Garmich (Persian: گرميچ, also Romanized as Garmīch) is a village in Lalehabad Rural District, Lalehabad District, Babol County, Mazandaran Province, Iran. At the 2006 census, its population was 271, in 62 families.
