= Kerfu Kola =

Kerfu Kola كرفوكلا
- Village
- Location within Iran
- Coordinates: 36°35′05″N 52°33′23″E
- Country: Iran
- Province: Mazandaran
- County: Babol
- Bakhsh: Lalehabad
- Rural District: Karipey

Population (2006)
  - Total: 338
- Time zone: UTC+3:30 (IRST)
  - Summer (DST): UTC+4:30 (IRDT)

Kerfu Kola (Persian: كرفوكلا, also Romanized as Kerfū Kolā; also known as Kerfā Kolā) is a village in Karipey Rural District, Lalehabad District, Babol County, Mazandaran Province, Iran. At the 2006 census, its population was 338, in 80 families.
