= Teraqechi Kola =

Teraqechi Kola طرقچي كلا
- Village
- Location within Iran
- Coordinates: 36°27′00″N 52°31′00″E
- Country: Iran
- Province: Mazandaran
- County: Babol
- Bakhsh: Lalehabad
- Rural District: Lalehabad

Population (2006)
  - Total: 342
- Time zone: UTC+3:30 (IRST)
  - Summer (DST): UTC+4:30 (IRDT)

Teraqechi Kola (Persian: طرقچي كلا, also Romanized as Ţeraqechī Kolā; also known as Ţeraqīchī Kolā) is a village in Lalehabad Rural District, Lalehabad District, Babol County, Mazandaran Province, Iran. At the 2006 census, its population was 342, in 87 families.
