= Khatib (disambiguation) =

Khatib may refer to the following:

- Khatib, an Islamic term for a person who delivers a sermon
- Khatib (surname)
- Khatib, Saudi Arabia, a village in Jizan Province, in southwestern Saudi Arabia
- Khatib, Kerman, a village in Kerman Province, Iran
- Khatib, Mazandaran, a village in Mazandaran Province, Iran
- Khatib, Tabriz, a district in Tabriz
- Khatib, Singapore, a subzone in the town of Yishun, Singapore
- Khatib MRT station, a rapid transit station in Singapore located in Khatib Subzone
