= Esbu Kola =

Esbu Kola or Asbu Kala or Asbu Kola (Persian: اسبوكلا) may refer to:

- Esbu Kola, Babol
- Esbu Kola-ye Karim Kola, Fereydunkenar County
- Esbu Kola, Sari
- Esbu Kola, Savadkuh
- Esbu Kola Rural District, in Babol County
