= Buleh Kola =

Buleh Kola بوله كلا
- Village
- Location within Iran
- Coordinates: 36°29′52″N 52°37′41″E
- Country: Iran
- Province: Mazandaran
- County: Babol
- Bakhsh: Central
- Rural District: Esbu Kola

Population (2006)
  - Total: 350
- Time zone: UTC+3:30 (IRST)
  - Summer (DST): UTC+4:30 (IRDT)

Buleh Kola (Persian: بوله كلا, also Romanized as Būleh Kolā) is a village in Esbu Kola Rural District, in the Central District of Babol County, Mazandaran Province, Iran. At the 2006 census, its population was 350, spread across 90 families.
