= Soleyman Kola =

Soleyman Kola سليمان كلا
- Village
- Location within Iran
- Coordinates: 36°33′50″N 52°46′03″E
- Country: Iran
- Province: Mazandaran
- County: Babol
- Bakhsh: Central
- Rural District: Feyziyeh

Population (2016)
  - Total: 395
- Time zone: UTC+3:30 (IRST)

Soleyman Kola (Persian: سليمان كلا, also Romanized as Soleymān Kolā) is a village in Feyziyeh Rural District, in the Central District of Babol County, Mazandaran Province, Iran.

At the time of the 2006 National Census, the village's population was 305 in 80 households. The following census in 2011 counted 342 people in 104 households. The 2016 census measured the population of the village as 395 people in 142 households.
