= Shasib Kola =

Shasib Kola شاسيبكلا
- Village
- Location within Iran
- Coordinates: 36°26′49″N 52°35′50″E
- Country: Iran
- Province: Mazandaran
- County: Babol
- Bakhsh: Central
- Rural District: Esbu Kola

Population (2006)
  - Total: 127
- Time zone: UTC+3:30 (IRST)
  - Summer (DST): UTC+4:30 (IRDT)

Shasib Kola (Persian: شاسيبكلا, also romanized as Shāsīb Kolā; also known as Shāseb Kolā and Shāyeb Kolā) is a village in Esbu Kola Rural District, in the Central District of Babol County, Mazandaran Province, Iran. At the 2006 census, its population was 127, in 35 families.
