= Masir Mahalleh =

Masir Mahalleh مصيرمحله
- Village
- Location within Iran
- Coordinates: 36°28′01″N 52°31′22″E
- Country: Iran
- Province: Mazandaran
- County: Babol
- Bakhsh: Lalehabad
- Rural District: Karipey

Population (2006)
  - Total: 233
- Time zone: UTC+3:30 (IRST)
  - Summer (DST): UTC+4:30 (IRDT)

Masir Mahalleh (Persian: مصيرمحله, also Romanized as Masīr Maḩalleh; also known as Masīr Maḩalleh-ye Bālā, Maşīr Maḩalleh-ye Bālā, and Moşber Maḩalleh) is a village in Karipey Rural District, Lalehabad District, Babol County, Mazandaran Province, Iran. At the 2006 census, its population was 233, in 64 families.
