= Shahid Abdollah =

Shahid Abdollah شهيدعبداله
- Village
- Country: Iran
- Province: Mazandaran
- County: Babol
- Bakhsh: Lalehabad
- Rural District: Karipey

Population (2006)
  - Total: 331
- Time zone: UTC+3:30 (IRST)
  - Summer (DST): UTC+4:30 (IRDT)

Shahid Abdollah (Persian: شهيدعبداله, also Romanized as Shahīd ʿAbdollah) is a village in Karipey Rural District, Lalehabad District, Babol County, Mazandaran Province, Iran. At the 2006 census, its population was 331, in 86 families.
