= Kalmadan-e Naqib =

Kalmadan-e Naqib كلمدان نقيب
- Village
- Location within Iran
- Coordinates: 36°32′31″N 52°45′38″E
- Country: Iran
- Province: Mazandaran
- County: Babol
- Bakhsh: Central
- Rural District: Feyziyeh

Population (2016)
  - Total: 286
- Time zone: UTC+3:30 (IRST)

Kalmadan-e Naqib (Persian: كلمدان نقيب, also Romanized as Kalmadān-e Naqīb; also known as Galmadān, Kalmeyn, Kalmīdān, and Kelemeydān) is a village in Feyziyeh Rural District, in the Central District of Babol County, Mazandaran Province, Iran.

At the time of the 2006 National Census, the village's population was 287 in 77 households. The following census in 2011 counted 284 people in 93 households. The 2016 census measured the population of the village as 286 people in 101 households.
