= Darvish Khak =

Darvish Khak (Persian: درويش خاك) may refer to:

- Darvish Khak-e Bala
- Darvish Khak-e Marzun
- Darvish Khak-e Pain
