= Gorjiabad =

Village in Mazandaran province, Iran

Gorjiabad Persian: گرجی اباد
- Village
- Location within Iran
- Coordinates: 36°31′13″N 52°43′16″E
- Country: Iran
- Province: Mazandaran
- County: Babol
- District: Central
- Rural District: Feyziyeh

Population (2016)
  - Total: 2,174
- Time zone: UTC+3:30 (IRST)

Gorjiabad (Persian: گرجی‌آباد) (Note: Also romanized as Gorjīābād) is a village in Feyziyeh Rural District of the Central District in Babol County, Mazandaran province, Iran.

== Demographics ==
=== Population ===
At the time of the 2006 National Census, the village's population was 2,069 in 518 households. The following census in 2011 counted 2,155 people in 606 households. The 2016 census measured the population of the village as 2,174 people in 725 households.
