= Barsemnan =

Village in Mazandaran province, Iran

Barsemnan Persian: برسمنان
- Village
- Location within Iran
- Coordinates: 36°32′34″N 52°36′35″E
- Country: Iran
- Province: Mazandaran
- County: Babol
- District: Lalehabad
- Rural District: Karipey

Population (2016)
  - Total: 1,600
- Time zone: UTC+3:30 (IRST)

Barsemnan (Persian: برسمنان) (Note: Also romanized as Barsemnān) is a village in Karipey Rural District of Lalehabad District in Babol County, Mazandaran province, Iran.

== Demographics ==
=== Population ===
At the time of the 2006 National Census, the village's population was 1,565 in 360 households. The following census in 2011 counted 1,673 people in 476 households. The 2016 census measured the population of the village as 1,600 people in 519 households.
