= Ahmad Chaleh Pey =

Ahmad Chaleh Pey (Persian: احمدچاله پي) may refer to:

- Bala Ahmad Chaleh Pey
- Pain Ahmad Chaleh Pey
