= Laluk, Babol =

Laluk للوك
- Village
- Location within Iran
- Coordinates: 36°26′15″N 52°31′20″E
- Country: Iran
- Province: Mazandaran
- County: Babol
- Bakhsh: Lalehabad
- Rural District: Lalehabad

Population (2006)
  - Total: 421
- Time zone: UTC+3:30 (IRST)
  - Summer (DST): UTC+4:30 (IRDT)

Laluk (Persian: للوك, also Romanized as Lalūk) is a village in Lalehabad Rural District, Lalehabad District, Babol County, Mazandaran Province, Iran. At the 2006 census, its population was 421, in 102 families.
