= Bazyar =

Bazyar or Baziar (Persian: بازيار) may refer to:

- Bala Bazyar
- Pain Bazyar
