= Langur (disambiguation) =

Langurs are a subgroup of the Colobinae family of monkeys.

Langur may also refer to:

- Langur, a populated place in Iran, consisting of Langur-e Bala and Langur-e Pain
- Langur River, a river in Russia, tributary of the Sosva
- Langur, Russia, a settlement in the district of Ivdel, Russia

== See also ==
- Langor (disambiguation)
