= Qaemiyeh, Mazandaran =

Village in Mazandaran province, Iran

Qaemiyeh Persian: قائميه
- Village
- Location within Iran
- Coordinates: 36°33′25″N 52°46′25″E
- Country: Iran
- Province: Mazandaran
- County: Babol
- District: Central
- Rural District: Feyziyeh

Population (2016)
  - Total: 551
- Time zone: UTC+3:30 (IRST)

Qaemiyeh (Persian: قائميه) (Note: Also romanized as Qā’emīyeh and Qa‘emīyeh) is a village in Feyziyeh Rural District of the Central District in Babol County, Mazandaran province, Iran.

== Demographics ==
=== Population ===
At the time of the 2006 National Census, the village's population was 507 in 135 households. The following census in 2011 counted 533 people in 167 households. The 2016 census measured the population of the village as 551 people in 187 households.
