= Babalkan-e Olya =

Babalkan-e Olya بابلكان عليا
- Village
- Location within Iran
- Coordinates: 36°29′14″N 52°34′05″E
- Country: Iran
- Province: Mazandaran
- County: Babol
- Bakhsh: Lalehabad
- Rural District: Lalehabad

Population (2006)
  - Total: 379
- Time zone: UTC+3:30 (IRST)
  - Summer (DST): UTC+4:30 (IRDT)

Babalkan-e Olya (Persian: بابلكان عليا, also Romanized as Bābalkān-e ‘Olyā; also known as Bābalkān-e Bālā and Bālā Bābalkān) is a village in Lalehabad Rural District, Lalehabad District, Babol County, Mazandaran Province, Iran. At the 2006 census, its population was 379, in 96 families.
