= Qadi Kola, Babol =

Village in Mazandaran province, Iran

Qadi Kola Persian: قاديكلا
- Village
- Location within Iran
- Coordinates: 36°35′16″N 52°35′18″E
- Country: Iran
- Province: Mazandaran
- County: Babol
- District: Lalehabad
- Rural District: Karipey

Population (2016)
  - Total: 508
- Time zone: UTC+3:30 (IRST)

Qadi Kola (Persian: قاديكلا) (Note: Also romanized as Qādī Kolā; also known as Pā’īn Qādī Kolā) is a village in Karipey Rural District of Lalehabad District in Babol County, Mazandaran province, Iran.

== Demographics ==
=== Population ===
At the time of the 2006 National Census, the village's population was 530 in 144 households. The following census in 2011 counted 579 people in 177 households. The 2016 census measured the population of the village as 508 people in 180 households.
