= Beji (disambiguation) =

Beji, Béji or Bejī may refer to the following:

== Places ==
- Beji, a district in Depok city, Indonesia
- Beji, a district in Pasuruan Regency, Indonesia
- Bejī Kolā, an alternate name for Biji Kola, a village in Iran

== Food ==
- Beji (cookie), an Iranian confectionery

== People ==
=== Given name ===
- Beji Caid Essebsi (1926 – 2019), Tunisian politician
- Beji Anthony (born 1999), Nigerian footballer

=== Surname ===
- Hélé Béji (born 1948), Tunisian writer
- Ghazi Beji, a Tunisian convict

== See also ==
- Bejís, a municipality in Spain
- Pura Beji Sangsit
