= Soltan Mohammad-e Taher =

Village in Mazandaran province, Iran

Soltan Mohammad-e Taher Persian: سلطان محمد طاهر
- Village
- Location within Iran
- Coordinates: 36°32′55″N 52°43′48″E
- Country: Iran
- Province: Mazandaran
- County: Babol
- District: Central
- Rural District: Feyziyeh

Population (2016)
  - Total: 2,081
- Time zone: UTC+3:30 (IRST)

Soltan Mohammad-e Taher (Persian: سلطان محمدطاهر) (Note: Also romanized as Solţān Moḩammad-e Ţāher; also known as Emāmzādeh Solţān Moḩammad-e Ţāher) is a village in, and the capital of, Feyziyeh Rural District in the Central District of Babol County, Mazandaran province, Iran.

== Demographics ==
=== Population ===
At the time of the 2006 National Census, the village's population was 1,352 in 369 households. The following census in 2011 counted 1,616 people in 420 households. The 2016 census measured the population of the village as 2,081 people in 634 households.
