= Gardanbori-ye Sofla =

Gardanbori-ye Sofla گردن بري سفلي
- Village
- Location within Iran
- Coordinates: 36°33′07″N 52°33′40″E
- Country: Iran
- Province: Mazandaran
- County: Babol
- Bakhsh: Lalehabad
- Rural District: Karipey

Population (2006)
  - Total: 306
- Time zone: UTC+3:30 (IRST)
  - Summer (DST): UTC+4:30 (IRDT)

Gardanbori-ye Sofla (Persian: گردن بري سفلي, also Romanized as Gardanborī-ye Soflá; also known as Pā’īn Gardan Borī) is a village in Karipey Rural District, Lalehabad District, Babol County, Mazandaran Province, Iran. At the 2006 census, its population was 306, in 72 families.
