= Khardun Kola =

Village in Mazandaran province, Iran

Khardun Kola Persian: خردون كلا
- Village
- Location within Iran
- Coordinates: 36°31′15″N 52°38′02″E
- Country: Iran
- Province: Mazandaran
- County: Babol
- District: Lalehabad
- Rural District: Karipey

Population (2016)
  - Total: 1,172
- Time zone: UTC+3:30 (IRST)

Khardun Kola (Persian: خردون كلا) (Note: Also romanized as Khardūn Kolā; also known as Khardonkolā-ye Bālā Maḩal and Khardūn Kolā-ye Bālā) is a village in Karipey Rural District of Lalehabad District in Babol County, Mazandaran province, Iran.

== Demographics ==
=== Population ===
At the time of the 2006 National Census, the village's population was 1,111 in 308 households. The following census in 2011 counted 1,203 people in 373 households. The 2016 census measured the population of the village as 1,172 people in 388 households.
