= Asb-e Shur Pey =

Village in Mazandaran province, Iran

Asb-e Shur Pey Persian: اسب شورپي
- Village
- Location within Iran
- Coordinates: 36°33′28″N 52°32′23″E
- Country: Iran
- Province: Mazandaran
- County: Babol
- District: Lalehabad
- Rural District: Karipey

Population (2016)
  - Total: 567
- Time zone: UTC+3:30 (IRST)

Asb-e Shur Pey (Persian: اسب شورپي) (Note: Also romanized as Asb Shūrpey and Asb-e Shūr Pey; also known as Asb Shūr’ī) is a village in Karipey Rural District of Lalehabad District in Babol County, Mazandaran province, Iran.

== Demographics ==
=== Population ===
At the time of the 2006 National Census, the village's population was 585 in 148 households. The following census in 2011 counted 588 people in 179 households. The 2016 census measured the population of the village as 567 people in 186 households.
