= Gardanbori =

Gardanbori or Gardan Bori (Persian: گردن بري) may refer to:

- Gardanbori-ye Olya
- Gardanbori-ye Sofla
