= Qomi Kola =

Village in Mazandaran province, Iran

Qomi Kola Persian: قمی‌کلا
- Village
- Location within Iran
- Coordinates: 36°26′46″N 52°36′22″E
- Country: Iran
- Province: Mazandaran
- County: Babol
- District: Central
- Rural District: Esbu Kola

Population (2016)
  - Total: 612
- Time zone: UTC+3:30 (IRST)

Qomi Kola (Persian: قمی‌کلا) (Note: Also romanized as Qomī Kalā and Qomī Kolā) is a village in Esbu Kola Rural District of the Central District in Babol County, Mazandaran province, Iran.

== Demographics ==
=== Population ===
At the time of the 2006 National Census, the village's population was 652 in 181 households. The following census in 2011 counted 628 people in 203 households. The 2016 census measured the population of the village as 612 people in 216 households.

== Notable persons ==
- Masih Alinejad (born 1976), Iranian-American journalist, author, and political activist
