= Shareh =

Shareh or Sharah (Persian: شاره or شره) may refer to:

- Shareh, Khuzestan (شره)
- Shareh, Mazandaran (شاره - Shāreh)
- Shareh, Razavi Khorasan (شاره - Shāreh)
