= Hamzeh Kola-ye Shesh Pol =

Village in Mazandaran province, Iran

Hamzeh Kola-ye Shesh Pol Persian: حمزه كلا شش پل
- Village
- Location within Iran
- Coordinates: 36°29′00″N 52°35′31″E
- Country: Iran
- Province: Mazandaran
- County: Babol
- District: Central
- Rural District: Esbu Kola

Population (2016)
  - Total: 1,235
- Time zone: UTC+3:30 (IRST)

Hamzeh Kola-ye Shesh Pol (Persian: حمزه كلا شش پل) (Note: Also romanized as Ḩamzeh Kolā-ye Shesh Pol; also known as Ḩamzeh Kalā and Ḩamzeh Kolā) is a village in Esbu Kola Rural District of the Central District in Babol County, Mazandaran province, Iran.

== Demographics ==
=== Population ===
At the time of the 2006 National Census, the village's population was 1,180 in 328 households. The following census in 2011 counted 1,160 people in 364 households. The 2016 census measured the population of the village as 1,235 people in 417 households.
