= Kati Sar, Lalehabad =

Kati Sar كتي سر
- Village
- Location within Iran
- Coordinates: 36°33′29″N 52°36′02″E
- Country: Iran
- Province: Mazandaran
- County: Babol
- Bakhsh: Lalehabad
- Rural District: Karipey

Population (2006)
  - Total: 427
- Time zone: UTC+3:30 (IRST)
  - Summer (DST): UTC+4:30 (IRDT)

Kati Sar (Persian: كتي سر, also Romanized as Katī Sar; also known as Kūtī Sar) is a village in Karipey Rural District, Lalehabad District, Babol County, Mazandaran Province, Iran. At the 2006 census, its population was 427, in 102 families.
