= Shariat Kola =

Village in Mazandaran province, Iran

Shariat Kola Persian: شريعت كلا
- Village
- Location within Iran
- Coordinates: 36°34′56″N 52°33′14″E
- Country: Iran
- Province: Mazandaran
- County: Babol
- District: Lalehabad
- Rural District: Karipey

Population (2016)
  - Total: 604
- Time zone: UTC+3:30 (IRST)

Shariat Kola (Persian: شريعت كلا) (Note: Also romanized as Sharī‘at Kolā; also known as Shāh Kolā) is a village in Karipey Rural District of Lalehabad District in Babol County, Mazandaran province, Iran.

== Demographics ==
=== Population ===
At the time of the 2006 National Census, the village's population was 723 in 179 households. The following census in 2011 counted 685 people in 199 households. The 2016 census measured the population of the village as 604 people in 206 households.
