= Basra-ye Bala =

Village in Mazandaran province, Iran

Basra-ye Bala Persian: بصرابالا
- Village
- Location within Iran
- Coordinates: 36°32′56″N 52°35′37″E
- Country: Iran
- Province: Mazandaran
- County: Babol
- District: Lalehabad
- Rural District: Karipey

Population (2016)
  - Total: 622
- Time zone: UTC+3:30 (IRST)

Basra-ye Bala (Persian: بصرابالا) (Note: Also romanized as Başrā-ye Bālā; also known as Bālā Başrā and Başrā) is a village in Karipey Rural District of Lalehabad District in Babol County, Mazandaran province, Iran.

== Demographics ==
=== Population ===
At the time of the 2006 National Census, the village's population was 473 in 119 households. The following census in 2011 counted 445 people in 132 households. The 2016 census measured the population of the village as 622 people in 204 households.
