= Mansur Kandeh =

Village in Mazandaran province, Iran

Mansur Kandeh Persian: منصوركنده
- Village
- Location within Iran
- Coordinates: 36°31′58″N 52°44′09″E
- Country: Iran
- Province: Mazandaran
- County: Babol
- District: Central
- Rural District: Feyziyeh

Population (2016)
  - Total: 911
- Time zone: UTC+3:30 (IRST)

Mansur Kandeh (Persian: منصوركنده) (Note: Also romanized as Manşūr Kandeh) is a village in Feyziyeh Rural District of the Central District in Babol County, Mazandaran province, Iran.

== Demographics ==
=== Population ===
At the time of the 2006 National Census, the village's population was 915 in 226 households. The following census in 2011 counted 899 people in 260 households. The 2016 census measured the population of the village as 911 people in 302 households.
