= Langur-e Bala =

Langur-e Bala لنگوربالا
- Neighborhood
- Location within Iran
- Coordinates: 36°36′19″N 52°44′36″E
- Country: Iran
- Province: Mazandaran
- County: Babol
- Bakhsh: Central
- Rural District: Feyziyeh
- Village: Langur

Population (2006)
  - Total: 406
- Time zone: UTC+3:30 (IRST)

Langur-e Bala (Persian: لنگوربالا, also Romanized as Langūr-e Bālā; also known as Bālā Langūr) is a neighborhood of Langur village in Feyziyeh Rural District, in the Central District of Babol County, Mazandaran Province, Iran.

At the 2006 census, its population was 406, in 108 families, when it was a separate village.
