= Mati Kola =

Village in Mazandaran province, Iran

Mati Kola Persian: متي كلا
- Village
- Location within Iran
- Coordinates: 36°30′16″N 52°38′13″E
- Country: Iran
- Province: Mazandaran
- County: Babol
- District: Central
- Rural District: Esbu Kola

Population (2016)
  - Total: 2,902
- Time zone: UTC+3:30 (IRST)
- Website: www.matikola.ir

Mati Kola (Persian: متي كلا) (Note: Also romanized as Matī Kolā; also known as Mateh Kolā, Matteh Kalā, and Matteh Kolā) is a village in Esbu Kola Rural District of the Central District in Babol County, Mazandaran province, Iran.

== Demographics ==
=== Population ===
At the time of the 2006 National Census, the village's population was 1,166 in 312 households. The following census in 2011 counted 2,693 people in 387 households. The 2016 census measured the population of the village as 2,902 people in 443 households. It was the most populous village in its rural district.
