= Taligaran =

Village in Mazandaran province, Iran

Taligaran Persian: تلي گران
- Village
- Location within Iran
- Coordinates: 36°34′26″N 52°34′55″E
- Country: Iran
- Province: Mazandaran
- County: Babol
- District: Lalehabad
- Rural District: Karipey

Population (2016)
  - Total: 1,015
- Time zone: UTC+3:30 (IRST)

Taligaran (Persian: تلي گران) (Note: Also romanized as Talīgarān; also known as Talīkarān) is a village in Karipey Rural District of Lalehabad District in Babol County, Mazandaran province, Iran.

== Demographics ==
=== Population ===
At the time of the 2006 National Census, the village's population was 955 in 260 households. The following census in 2011 counted 1,024 people in 330 households. The 2016 census measured the population of the village as 1,015 people in 371 households.
