= Aminabad, Babol =

Village in Mazandaran province, Iran

Aminabad Persian: امین‌آباد
- Village
- Location within Iran
- Coordinates: 36°30′23″N 52°32′54″E
- Country: Iran
- Province: Mazandaran
- County: Babol
- District: Lalehabad
- Rural District: Karipey

Population (2016)
  - Total: 1,952
- Time zone: UTC+3:30 (IRST)

Aminabad (Persian: امین‌آباد) (Note: Also romanized as Amīnābād) is a village in Karipey Rural District of Lalehabad District in Babol County, Mazandaran province, Iran.

== Demographics ==
=== Population ===
At the time of the 2006 National Census, the village's population was 1,970 in 550 households. The following census in 2011 counted 2,019 people in 639 households. The 2016 census measured the population of the village as 1,952 people in 672 households. It was the most populous village in its rural district.
