= Darvish Khak-e Pain =

Darvish Khak-e Pain درويش خاك پائين
- Village
- Location within Iran
- Coordinates: 36°30′09″N 52°37′11″E
- Country: Iran
- Province: Mazandaran
- County: Babol
- Bakhsh: Central
- Rural District: Esbu Kola

Population (2006)
  - Total: 354
- Time zone: UTC+3:30 (IRST)
  - Summer (DST): UTC+4:30 (IRDT)

Darvish Khak-e Pain (Persian: درويش خاك پائين, also Romanized as Darvīsh Khāk-e Pā’īn; also known as Pā’īn Darvīsh Khāk) is a village in Esbu Kola Rural District, in the Central District of Babol County, Mazandaran Province, Iran. At the 2006 census, its population was 354, in 93 families.
