= Kalhu Dasht-e Bala =

Kalhu Dasht-e Bala كلهودشت بالا
- Village
- Location within Iran
- Coordinates: 36°32′18″N 52°47′44″E
- Country: Iran
- Province: Mazandaran
- County: Babol
- Bakhsh: Central
- Rural District: Feyziyeh

Population (2016)
  - Total: 179
- Time zone: UTC+3:30 (IRST)

Kalhu Dasht-e Bala (Persian: كلهودشت بالا, also Romanized as Kalhū Dasht-e Bālā) is a village in Feyziyeh Rural District, in the Central District of Babol County, Mazandaran Province, Iran.

At the time of the 2006 National Census, the village's population was 146 in 39 households. The following census in 2011 counted 135 people in 43 households. The 2016 census measured the population of the village as 179 people in 58 households.
