= Mir Rud Posht =

Village in Mazandaran province, Iran

Mir Rud Posht Persian: ميررودپشت
- Village
- Location within Iran
- Coordinates: 36°28′58″N 52°42′43″E
- Country: Iran
- Province: Mazandaran
- County: Babol
- District: Central
- Rural District: Ganj Afruz

Population (2016)
  - Total: 1,225
- Time zone: UTC+3:30 (IRST)

Mir Rud Posht (Persian: ميررودپشت) (Note: Also romanized as Mīr Rūd Posht; also known as Mīrūd Posht) is a village in Ganj Afruz Rural District of the Central District in Babol County, Mazandaran province, Iran.

== Demographics ==
=== Population ===
At the time of the 2006 National Census, the village's population was 1,339 in 362 households. The following census in 2011 counted 1,356 people in 412 households. The 2016 census measured the population of the village as 1,225 people in 410 households.
