= Basra-ye Pain =

Village in Mazandaran province, Iran

Basra-ye Pain Persian: بصراپايين
- Village
- Location within Iran
- Coordinates: 36°33′27″N 52°35′17″E
- Country: Iran
- Province: Mazandaran
- County: Babol
- District: Lalehabad
- Rural District: Karipey

Population (2016)
  - Total: 533
- Time zone: UTC+3:30 (IRST)

Basra-ye Pain (Persian: بصراپايين) (Note: Also romanized as Başrā-ye Pā’īn; also known as Pā’īn Başrā and Pā’īn Başreh) is a village in Karipey Rural District of Lalehabad District in Babol County, Mazandaran province, Iran.

== Demographics ==
=== Population ===
At the time of the 2006 National Census, the village's population was 537 in 128 households. The following census in 2011 counted 528 people in 154 households. The 2016 census measured the population of the village as 533 people in 176 households.
