= Keru Kola =

Keru Kola or Karu Kola (Persian: كروكلا) may refer to:

- Bala Keru Kola
- Pain Karu Kola
