= Tork Mahalleh, Babol =

Village in Mazandaran province, Iran

Tork Mahalleh Persian: ترك محله
- Village
- Location within Iran
- Coordinates: 36°30′49″N 52°39′04″E
- Country: Iran
- Province: Mazandaran
- County: Babol
- District: Central
- Rural District: Esbu Kola

Population (2016)
  - Total: 1,811
- Time zone: UTC+3:30 (IRST)

Tork Mahalleh (Persian: ترك محله) (Note: Also romanized as Terk Mahalleh and Tork Maḩalleh) is a village in Esbu Kola Rural District of the Central District in Babol County, Mazandaran province, Iran.

== Demographics ==
=== Population ===
At the time of the 2006 National Census, the village's population was 1,638 in 413 households. The following census in 2011 counted 1,799 people in 530 households. The 2016 census measured the population of the village as 1,811 people in 580 households.
