= Varmatun =

Village in Mazandaran province, Iran

Varmatun Persian: ورمتون
- Village
- Location within Iran
- Coordinates: 36°29′37″N 52°33′52″E
- Country: Iran
- Province: Mazandaran
- County: Babol
- District: Lalehabad
- Rural District: Lalehabad

Population (2016)
  - Total: 515
- Time zone: UTC+3:30 (IRST)

Varmatun (Persian: ورمتون) (Note: Also romanized as Varmatūn; also known as Varmatān) is a village in Lalehabad Rural District of Lalehabad District in Babol County, Mazandaran province, Iran.

== Demographics ==
=== Population ===
At the time of the 2006 National Census, the village's population was 490 in 131 households. The following census in 2011 counted 431 people in 138 households. The 2016 census measured the population of the village as 515 people in 176 households.
