= Chamaz Kola, Babol =

Village in Mazandaran province, Iran

Chamaz Kola Persian: چمازكلا
- Village
- Location within Iran
- Coordinates: 36°30′44″N 52°45′06″E
- Country: Iran
- Province: Mazandaran
- County: Babol
- District: Central
- Rural District: Feyziyeh

Population (2016)
  - Total: 1,007
- Time zone: UTC+3:30 (IRST)

Chamaz Kola (Persian: چمازكلا) (Note: Also romanized as Chamāz Kolā) is a village in Feyziyeh Rural District of the Central District in Babol County, Mazandaran province, Iran.

== Demographics ==
=== Population ===
At the time of the 2006 National Census, the village's population was 858 in 210 households. The following census in 2011 counted 969 people in 277 households. The 2016 census measured the population of the village as 1,007 people in 320 households.
