= Navai Kola =

Village in Mazandaran province, Iran

Navai Kola Persian: نوايي كلا
- Village
- Location within Iran
- Coordinates: 36°28′46″N 52°31′19″E
- Country: Iran
- Province: Mazandaran
- County: Babol
- District: Lalehabad
- Rural District: Karipey

Population (2016)
  - Total: 727
- Time zone: UTC+3:30 (IRST)

Navai Kola (Persian: نوايي كلا) (Note: Also romanized as Navā’ī Kolā) is a village in Karipey Rural District of Lalehabad District in Babol County, Mazandaran province, Iran.

== Demographics ==
=== Population ===
At the time of the 2006 National Census, the village's population was 746 in 178 households. The following census in 2011 counted 789 people in 218 households. The 2016 census measured the population of the village as 727 people in 209 households.
