= Pain Ganj Afruz =

Village in Mazandaran province, Iran

Pain Ganj Afruz Persian: پايين گنج افروز
- Village
- Location within Iran
- Coordinates: 36°27′22″N 52°41′56″E
- Country: Iran
- Province: Mazandaran
- County: Babol
- District: Central
- Rural District: Ganj Afruz

Population (2016)
  - Total: 4,945
- Time zone: UTC+3:30 (IRST)

Pain Ganj Afruz (Persian: پايين گنج افروز) (Note: Also romanized as Pā’īn Ganj Afrūz) is a village in, and the capital of, Ganj Afruz Rural District in the Central District of Babol County, Mazandaran province, Iran.

== Demographics ==
=== Population ===
At the time of the 2006 National Census, the village's population was 4,821 in 1,380 households. The following census in 2011 counted 4,912 people in 1,567 households. The 2016 census measured the population of the village as 4,945 people in 1,686 households. It was the most populous village in its rural district.
