= Ramnet =

Village in Mazandaran province, Iran

Ramnet Persian: رمنت
- Village
- Location within Iran
- Coordinates: 36°34′13″N 52°44′06″E
- Country: Iran
- Province: Mazandaran
- County: Babol
- District: Central
- Rural District: Feyziyeh

Population (2016)
  - Total: 2,265
- Time zone: UTC+3:30 (IRST)

Ramnet (Persian: رمنت) (Note: Also known as Ramtet) is a village in Feyziyeh Rural District of the Central District in Babol County, Mazandaran province, Iran.

== Demographics ==
=== Population ===
At the time of the 2006 National Census, the village's population was 2,350 in 629 households. The following census in 2011 counted 2,306 people in 732 households. The 2016 census measured the population of the village as 2,265 people in 768 households.
