= Galleh Kola =

Village in Mazandaran province, Iran

Galleh Kola Persian: گله كلا
- Village
- Location within Iran
- Coordinates: 36°35′16″N 52°39′34″E
- Country: Iran
- Province: Mazandaran
- County: Babol
- District: Central
- Rural District: Feyziyeh

Population (2016)
  - Total: 550
- Time zone: UTC+3:30 (IRST)

Galleh Kola (Persian: گله كلا) (Note: Also romanized as Galleh Kolā) is a village in Feyziyeh Rural District of the Central District in Babol County, Mazandaran province, Iran.

== Demographics ==
=== Population ===
At the time of the 2006 National Census, the village's population was 542 in 134 households. The following census in 2011 counted 532 people in 156 households. The 2016 census measured the population of the village as 550 people in 179 households.
