= Chamazin =

Village in Mazandaran province, Iran

Chamazin Persian: چمازين
- Village
- Location within Iran
- Coordinates: 36°30′36″N 52°35′14″E
- Country: Iran
- Province: Mazandaran
- County: Babol
- District: Lalehabad
- Rural District: Karipey

Population (2016)
  - Total: 769
- Time zone: UTC+3:30 (IRST)

Chamazin (Persian: چمازين) (Note: Also romanized as Chamāzīn) is a village in Karipey Rural District of Lalehabad District in Babol County, Mazandaran province, Iran.

== Demographics ==
=== Population ===
At the time of the 2006 National Census, the village's population was 758 in 177 households. The following census in 2011 counted 782 people in 230 households. The 2016 census measured the population of the village as 769 people in 250 households.
