= Alamdar, Mazandaran =

Village in Mazandaran province, Iran

Alamdar Persian: علمدار
- Village
- Location within Iran
- Coordinates: 36°30′46″N 52°42′32″E
- Country: Iran
- Province: Mazandaran
- County: Babol
- District: Central
- Rural District: Ganj Afruz

Population (2016)
  - Total: 2,324
- Time zone: UTC+3:30 (IRST)

Alamdar (Persian: علمدار) (Note: Also romanized as Alamdār and ‘Alamdār) is a village in Ganj Afruz Rural District of the Central District in Babol County, Mazandaran province, Iran.

== Demographics ==
=== Population ===
At the time of the 2006 National Census, the village's population was 1,713 in 479 households. The following census in 2011 counted 1,884 people in 606 households. The 2016 census measured the population of the village as 2,324 people in 784 households.
