= Buleh Kola-ye Marzunabad =

Village in Mazandaran province, Iran

Buleh Kola-ye Marzunabad Persian: بوله كلا مرزون آباد
- Village
- Location within Iran
- Coordinates: 36°34′23″N 52°39′01″E
- Country: Iran
- Province: Mazandaran
- County: Babol
- District: Central
- Rural District: Feyziyeh

Population (2016)
  - Total: 1,166
- Time zone: UTC+3:30 (IRST)

Buleh Kola-ye Marzunabad (Persian: بوله کلا مرزون‌آباد) (Note: Also romanized as Būleh Kolā-ye Marzūnābād; also known as Būleh Kolāy and Būleh Kolā-ye Mūzīraj) is a village in Feyziyeh Rural District of the Central District in Babol County, Mazandaran province, Iran.

== Demographics ==
=== Population ===
At the time of the 2006 National Census, the village's population was 819 in 223 households. The following census in 2011 counted 868 people in 269 households. The 2016 census measured the population of the village as 1,166 people in 389 households.
