= Babalkan =

Babalkan or Babolkan (Persian: بابلكان) may refer to:

- Babalkan-e Olya
- Babalkan-e Sofla
