= Aghuzbon, Babol =

Village in Mazandaran province, Iran

Aghuzbon Persian: آغوزبن
- Village
- Location within Iran
- Coordinates: 36°34′43″N 52°42′10″E
- Country: Iran
- Province: Mazandaran
- County: Babol
- District: Central
- Rural District: Feyziyeh

Population (2016)
  - Total: 1,442
- Time zone: UTC+3:30 (IRST)

Aghuzbon (Persian: آغوزبن) (Note: Also romanized as Āghūzbon) is a village in Feyziyeh Rural District of the Central District in Babol County, Mazandaran province, Iran.

== Demographics ==
=== Population ===
At the time of the 2006 National Census, the village's population was 1,435 in 376 households. The following census in 2011 counted 1,583 people in 461 households. The 2016 census measured the population of the village as 1,442 people in 463 households.
