= Naqib Kola-ye Salas =

Village in Mazandaran province, Iran

Naqib Kola-ye Salas Persian: نقيب كلاثلاث
- Village
- Location within Iran
- Coordinates: 36°28′33″N 52°45′29″E
- Country: Iran
- Province: Mazandaran
- County: Babol
- District: Central
- Rural District: Ganj Afruz

Population (2016)
  - Total: 446
- Time zone: UTC+3:30 (IRST)

Naqib Kola-ye Salas (Persian: نقيب كلاثلاث) (Note: Also romanized as Naqīb Kolā-ye S̄alās̱ and Naqīb Kolā-ye S̄alās; also known as Naqīb Kalā Joneyd, Naqīb Kolā, and Naqīb Kolā Joneyd) is a village in Ganj Afruz Rural District of the Central District in Babol County, Mazandaran province, Iran.

== Demographics ==
=== Population ===
At the time of the 2006 National Census, the village's population was 458 in 116 households. The following census in 2011 counted 422 people in 118 households. The 2016 census measured the population of the village as 446 people in 149 households.
