= Taraji Kola =

Village in Mazandaran province, Iran

Taraji Kola Persian: ترجیکلا
- Village
- Location within Iran
- Coordinates: 36°27′38″N 52°44′15″E
- Country: Iran
- Province: Mazandaran
- County: Babol
- District: Central
- Rural District: Ganj Afruz

Population (2016)
  - Total: 223
- Time zone: UTC+3:30 (IRST)

Taraji Kola (Persian: تراجکلا) (Note: Also romanized as Tarājī Kolā; also known as Tarāj Kolā (تراجکلا)) is a village in Ganj Afruz Rural District of the Central District in Babol County, Mazandaran province, Iran.

== Demographics ==
=== Population ===
At the time of the 2006 National Census, the village's population was 270 in 60 households. The following census in 2011 counted 272 people in 70 households. The 2016 census measured the population of the village as 223 people in 71 households.

== Climate ==
The highest temperature recorded in 2018 was 94 °F (34 °C) and, the lowest was 46 °F (8 °C).

Weather Averages in 2018
Month	°C	°F
January	10	49
February	10	50
March	15	60
April	15	59
May	23	73
June	25	78
July	30	86
August	27	80
September	25	77
October	22	72
November	15	59
December	14	56
