= Kalhu Dasht =

Kalhu Dasht (Persian: كلهودشت) may refer to:

- Kalhu Dasht-e Bala
- Kalhu Dasht-e Pain
