= Darzikola-ye Navshirvan =

Darzikola-ye Navshirvan درزئ كلانوشيروان
- Village
- Country: Iran
- Province: Mazandaran
- County: Babol
- Bakhsh: Central
- Rural District: Esbu Kola

Population (2006)
  - Total: 211
- Time zone: UTC+3:30 (IRST)
  - Summer (DST): UTC+4:30 (IRDT)

Darzikola-ye Navshirvan (Persian: درزئ كلانوشيروان, also Romanized as Darzikolā-ye Navshīrvān) is a village in Esbu Kola Rural District, in the Central District of Babol County, Mazandaran Province, Iran. At the 2006 census, its population was 211, in 56 families.
