= Sadat Mahalleh, Babol =

Village in Mazandaran province, Iran

Sadat Mahalleh Persian: سادات محله
- Village
- Location within Iran
- Coordinates: 36°28′18″N 52°36′46″E
- Country: Iran
- Province: Mazandaran
- County: Babol
- District: Central
- Rural District: Esbu Kola

Population (2016)
  - Total: 531
- Time zone: UTC+3:30 (IRST)

Sadat Mahalleh (Persian: سادات محله) (Note: Also romanized as Sādāt Maḩalleh) is a village in Esbu Kola Rural District of the Central District in Babol County, Mazandaran province, Iran.

== Demographics ==
=== Population ===
At the time of the 2006 National Census, the village's population was 483 in 125 households. The following census in 2011 counted 465 people in 138 households. The 2016 census measured the population of the village as 531 people in 175 households.
