= Andi Kola =

Village in Mazandaran province, Iran

Andi Kola Persian: انديكلا
- Village
- Location within Iran
- Coordinates: 36°28′51″N 52°32′02″E
- Country: Iran
- Province: Mazandaran
- County: Babol
- District: Lalehabad
- Rural District: Karipey

Population (2016)
  - Total: 710
- Time zone: UTC+3:30 (IRST)

Andi Kola (Persian: انديكلا) (Note: Also romanized as Andī Kolā; also known as Pā’īn Andī Kalā, and Pā’īn Andī Kolā) is a village in Karipey Rural District of Lalehabad District in Babol County, Mazandaran province, Iran.

== Demographics ==
=== Population ===
At the time of the 2006 National Census, the village's population was 916 in 260 households. The following census in 2011 counted 793 people in 248 households. The 2016 census measured the population of the village as 710 people in 255 households.
