= Muzigaleh =

Village in Mazandaran province, Iran

Muzigaleh Persian: موزی گله
- Village
- Location within Iran
- Coordinates: 36°33′03″N 52°45′24″E
- Country: Iran
- Province: Mazandaran
- County: Babol
- District: Central
- Rural District: Feyziyeh

Population (2016)
  - Total: 755
- Time zone: UTC+3:30 (IRST)

Muzigaleh (Persian: موزی گله) (Note: Also romanized as Mūzīgaleh) is a village in Feyziyeh Rural District of the Central District in Babol County, Mazandaran province, Iran.

== Demographics ==
=== Population ===
At the time of the 2006 National Census, the village's population was 608 in 161 households. The following census in 2011 counted 634 people in 188 households. The 2016 census measured the population of the village as 755 people in 255 households.
