= Kamangar, Iran =

Village in Mazandaran province, Iran

Kamangar Persian: كمانگر
- Village
- Location within Iran
- Coordinates: 36°31′53″N 52°36′11″E
- Country: Iran
- Province: Mazandaran
- County: Babol
- District: Lalehabad
- Rural District: Karipey

Population (2016)
  - Total: 900
- Time zone: UTC+3:30 (IRST)

Kamangar (Persian: كمانگر) (Note: Also romanized as Kamāngar) is a village in Karipey Rural District of Lalehabad District in Babol County, Mazandaran province, Iran.

== Demographics ==
=== Population ===
At the time of the 2006 National Census, the village's population was 921 in 227 households. The following census in 2011 counted 936 people in 251 households. The 2016 census measured the population of the village as 900 people in 276 households.
