= Chareh, Babol =

Village in Mazandaran province, Iran

Chareh Persian: چاره
- Village
- Location within Iran
- Coordinates: 36°27′48″N 52°40′45″E
- Country: Iran
- Province: Mazandaran
- County: Babol
- District: Central
- Rural District: Ganj Afruz

Population (2016)
  - Total: 2,592
- Time zone: UTC+3:30 (IRST)

Chareh (Persian: چاره) (Note: Also romanized as Chāreh; also known as Chārī) is a village in Ganj Afruz Rural District of the Central District in Babol County, Mazandaran province, Iran.

== Demographics ==
=== Population ===
At the time of the 2006 National Census, the village's population was 2,812 in 713 households. The following census in 2011 counted 2,784 people in 793 households. The 2016 census measured the population of the village as 2,592 people in 868 households.
