= Pija Kola =

Village in Mazandaran province, Iran

Pija Kola Persian: پيجاكلا
- Village
- Location within Iran
- Coordinates: 36°33′45″N 52°35′15″E
- Country: Iran
- Province: Mazandaran
- County: Babol
- District: Lalehabad
- Rural District: Karipey

Population (2016)
  - Total: 1,199
- Time zone: UTC+3:30 (IRST)

Pija Kola (Persian: پيجاكلا) (Note: Also romanized as Pījā Kolā; also known as Pīchā Kolā) is a village in Karipey Rural District of Lalehabad District in Babol County, Mazandaran province, Iran.

== Demographics ==
=== Population ===
At the time of the 2006 National Census, the village's population was 1,318 in 322 households. The following census in 2011 counted 1,290 people in 382 households. The 2016 census measured the population of the village as 1,199 people in 403 households.
