= Espi Kola-ye Ramnet =

Village in Mazandaran province, Iran

Espi Kola-ye Ramnet Persian: اسپی كلا رمنت
- Village
- Location within Iran
- Coordinates: 36.557°N 52.73°E
- Country: Iran
- Province: Mazandaran
- County: Babol
- District: Central
- Rural District: Feyziyeh

Population (2016)
  - Total: 739
- Time zone: UTC+3:30 (IRST)

Espi Kola-ye Ramnet (Persian: اسپی كلا رمنت) (Note: Also romanized as Espī Kolā-ye Ramnet) is a village in Feyziyeh Rural District of the Central District in Babol County, Mazandaran province, Iran.

== Demographics ==
=== Population ===
At the time of the 2006 National Census, the village's population was 588 in 155 households. The following census in 2011 counted 728 people in 198 households. The 2016 census measured the population of the village as 739 people in 239 households.
