= Dehak, Mazandaran =

Village in Mazandaran province, Iran

Dehak Persian: دهك
- Village
- Location within Iran
- Coordinates: 36°31′30″N 52°37′14″E
- Country: Iran
- Province: Mazandaran
- County: Babol
- District: Lalehabad
- Rural District: Karipey

Population (2016)
  - Total: 942
- Time zone: UTC+3:30 (IRST)

Dehak (Persian: دهك) is a village in Karipey Rural District of Lalehabad District in Babol County, Mazandaran province, Iran.

== Demographics ==
=== Population ===
At the time of the 2006 National Census, the village's population was 826 in 236 households. The following census in 2011 counted 928 people in 289 households. The 2016 census measured the population of the village as 942 people in 319 households.
