= Div Dasht =

Village in Mazandaran province, Iran

Div Dasht Persian: ديودشت
- Village
- Location within Iran
- Coordinates: 36°28′14″N 52°44′55″E
- Country: Iran
- Province: Mazandaran
- County: Babol
- District: Central
- Rural District: Ganj Afruz

Population (2016)
  - Total: 388
- Time zone: UTC+3:30 (IRST)

Div Dasht (Persian: ديودشت) (Note: Also romanized as Dīv Dasht) is a village in Ganj Afruz Rural District of the Central District in Babol County, Mazandaran province, Iran.

== Demographics ==
=== Population ===
At the time of the 2006 National Census, the village's population was 485 in 130 households. The following census in 2011 counted 512 people in 156 households. The 2016 census measured the population of the village as 388 people in 134 households.
