= Hatkeh Posht =

Village in Mazandaran province, Iran

Hatkeh Posht Persian: هتكه پشت
- Village
- Location within Iran
- Coordinates: 36°29′41″N 52°44′43″E
- Country: Iran
- Province: Mazandaran
- County: Babol
- District: Central
- Rural District: Ganj Afruz

Population (2016)
  - Total: 1,370
- Time zone: UTC+3:30 (IRST)

Hatkeh Posht (Persian: هتكه پشت) (Note: Also known as Matkeh Posht) is a village in Ganj Afruz Rural District of the Central District in Babol County, Mazandaran province, Iran.

== Demographics ==
=== Population ===
At the time of the 2006 National Census, the village's population was 1,269 in 320 households. The following census in 2011 counted 1,370 people in 457 households. The 2016 census measured the population of the village as 1,370 people in 457 households.
