= Neqarechi Mahalleh, Babol =

Village in Mazandaran province, Iran

Neqarechi Mahalleh Persian: نقارچي محله
- Village
- Location within Iran
- Coordinates: 36°28′58″N 52°37′36″E
- Country: Iran
- Province: Mazandaran
- County: Babol
- District: Central
- Rural District: Esbu Kola

Population (2016)
  - Total: 1,090
- Time zone: UTC+3:30 (IRST)

Neqarechi Mahalleh (Persian: نقارچي محله) (Note: Also romanized as Neqārechī Maḩalleh; also known as Neqārehchī and Neqārehchī Maḩalleh) is a village in Esbu Kola Rural District of the Central District in Babol County, Mazandaran province, Iran.

== Demographics ==
=== Population ===
At the time of the 2006 National Census, the village's population was 1,067 in 267 households. The following census in 2011 counted 1,097 people in 326 households. The 2016 census measured the population of the village as 1,090 people in 345 households.
