= Aqa Shafi =

Aqa Shafi (Persian: اقاشفيع) may refer to:

- Aqa Shafi, Kohgiluyeh and Boyer-Ahmad
- Aqa Shafi, Mazandaran
