= Now Shirvan Kola =

Village in Mazandaran province, Iran

Now Shirvan Kola Persian: نوشيروان كلا
- Village
- Location within Iran
- Coordinates: 36°27′38″N 52°36′38″E
- Country: Iran
- Province: Mazandaran
- County: Babol
- District: Central
- Rural District: Esbu Kola

Population (2016)
  - Total: 580
- Time zone: UTC+3:30 (IRST)

Now Shirvan Kola (Persian: نوشيروان كلا) (Note: Also romanized as Now Shīrvān Kolā; also known as Nūshīrvān Kalā Chārī and Nūshīrvān Kolā Chārī) is a village in Esbu Kola Rural District of the Central District in Babol County, Mazandaran province, Iran.

== Demographics ==
=== Population ===
At the time of the 2006 National Census, the village's population was 632 in 177 households. The following census in 2011 counted 624 people in 201 households. The 2016 census measured the population of the village as 580 people in 208 households.
