= Khorasan Mahalleh =

Village in Mazandaran province, Iran

Khorasan Mahalleh Persian: خراسان محله
- Village
- Location within Iran
- Coordinates: 36°28′55″N 52°36′10″E
- Country: Iran
- Province: Mazandaran
- County: Babol
- District: Central
- Rural District: Esbu Kola

Population (2016)
  - Total: 1,709
- Time zone: UTC+3:30 (IRST)

Khorasan Mahalleh (Persian: خراسان محله) (Note: Also romanized as Khorāsān Maḩalleh) is a village in Esbu Kola Rural District of the Central District in Babol County, Mazandaran province, Iran.

== Demographics ==
=== Population ===
At the time of the 2006 National Census, the village's population was 1,618 in 411 households. The following census in 2011 counted 1,809 people in 525 households. The 2016 census measured the population of the village as 1,709 people in 554 households.
