= Bala Bisheh Sar =

Village in Mazandaran province, Iran

Bala Bisheh Sar Persian: بالابيشه سر
- Village
- Location within Iran
- Coordinates: 36°35′33″N 52°43′05″E
- Country: Iran
- Province: Mazandaran
- County: Babol
- District: Central
- Rural District: Feyziyeh

Population (2016)
  - Total: 822
- Time zone: UTC+3:30 (IRST)

Bala Bisheh Sar (Persian: بالابيشه‌سر) (Note: Also romanized as Bālā Bīsheh Sar; also known as Bīsheh Sar Bālā) is a village in Feyziyeh Rural District of the Central District in Babol County, Mazandaran province, Iran.

== Demographics ==
=== Population ===
At the time of the 2006 National Census, the village's population was 807 in 208 households. The following census in 2011 counted 897 people in 270 households. The 2016 census measured the population of the village as 822 people in 273 households.
