= Hari Kandeh =

Village in Mazandaran province, Iran

Hari Kandeh Persian: هري كنده
- Village
- Location within Iran
- Coordinates: 36°29′43″N 52°43′05″E
- Country: Iran
- Province: Mazandaran
- County: Babol
- District: Central
- Rural District: Ganj Afruz

Population (2016)
  - Total: 2,011
- Time zone: UTC+3:30 (IRST)

Hari Kandeh (Persian: هري كنده) (Note: Also romanized as Harī Kandeh; also known as Harī Kandeh-e Pā’īn) is a village in Ganj Afruz Rural District of the Central District in Babol County, Mazandaran province, Iran.

== Demographics ==
=== Population ===
At the time of the 2006 National Census, the village's population was 1,998 in 501 households. The following census in 2011 counted 2,089 people in 672 households. The 2016 census measured the population of the village as 2,011 people in 663 households.
