= Darzi Kola-ye Kuchek =

Darzi Kola noshirvani درزی کُلا نوشیروانی
- Village
- Location within Iran
- Coordinates: 36°27′30″N 52°35′33″E
- Country: Iran
- Province: Mazandaran
- County: Babol
- Bakhsh: Lalehabad
- Rural District: Karipey

Population (2006)
  - Total: 242
- Time zone: UTC+3:30 (IRST)
  - Summer (DST): UTC+4:30 (IRDT)

Darzi Kola noshirvani (Persian: درزی کلا نوشیروانی, also Romanized as Darzī Kolā noshirvani, Darzī Kolā Noshirvani

, and Darzī Kolā noshirvani) is a village in Karipey Rural District, Lalehabad District, Babol County, Mazandaran Province, Iran. At the 2006 census, its population was 242, living in 59 families.
