= Hajji Kola, Lalehabad =

Village in Mazandaran province, Iran

Hajji Kola Persian: حاجي كلاا
- Village
- Location within Iran
- Coordinates: 36°30′57″N 52°36′32″E
- Country: Iran
- Province: Mazandaran
- County: Babol
- District: Lalehabad
- Rural District: Karipey

Population (2016)
  - Total: 931
- Time zone: UTC+3:30 (IRST)

Hajji Kola (Persian: حاجي كلا) (Note: Also romanized as Ḩājjī Kolā) is a village in Karipey Rural District of Lalehabad District in Babol County, Mazandaran province, Iran.

== Demographics ==
=== Population ===
At the time of the 2006 National Census, the village's population was 849 in 223 households. The following census in 2011 counted 936 people in 278 households. The 2016 census measured the population of the village as 931 people in 302 households.
