= Siah Kola Mahalleh =

Village in Mazandaran province, Iran

Siah Kola Mahalleh Persian: سياه کلا محله
- Village
- Location within Iran
- Coordinates: 36°30′23″N 52°41′20″E
- Country: Iran
- Province: Mazandaran
- County: Babol
- District: Central
- Rural District: Ganj Afruz

Population (2016)
  - Total: 3,866
- Time zone: UTC+3:30 (IRST)

Siah Kola Mahalleh (Persian: سياه کلا محله) (Note: Also romanized as Sīāh Kalā Maḩalleh and Sīāh Kolā Maḩalleh; also known as Sīāh Kalā Maḩalleh-ye Sharqī, Sīāh Kolā Maḩalleh-ye Sharqī, Sukra Mahalleh, and Surkh Mahalleh) is a village in Ganj Afruz Rural District of the Central District in Babol County, Mazandaran province, Iran.

== Demographics ==
=== Population ===
At the time of the 2006 National Census, the village's population was 3,854 in 1,045 households. The following census in 2011 counted 4,054 people in 1,218 households. The 2016 census measured the population of the village as 3,866 people in 1,239 households.
