= Kati Sar =

Kati Sar (Persian: كتي سر) may refer to:

- Kati Sar, Bandpey-ye Sharqi
- Kati Sar, Lalehabad
