= Bandar Kola-ye Aghowzin =

Village in Mazandaran province, Iran

Bandar Kola-ye Aghowzin Persian: بنداركلا آغوزين
- Village
- Location within Iran
- Coordinates: 36°34′51″N 52°41′29″E
- Country: Iran
- Province: Mazandaran
- County: Babol
- District: Central
- Rural District: Feyziyeh

Population (2016)
  - Total: 508
- Time zone: UTC+3:30 (IRST)

Bandar Kola-ye Aghowzin (Persian: بنداركلا آغوزين) (Note: Also romanized as Bandār Kolā-ye Āghowzīn; also known as Bandar Kolā and Bandār Kolā-ye Āghowz Bon) is a village in Feyziyeh Rural District of the Central District in Babol County, Mazandaran province, Iran.

== Demographics ==
=== Population ===
At the time of the 2006 National Census, the village's population was 337 in 85 households. The following census in 2011 counted 486 people in 137 households. The 2016 census measured the population of the village as 508 people in 156 households.
