= Halal Kola =

Village in Mazandaran province, Iran

Halal Kola Persian: هلال كلا
- Village
- Location within Iran
- Coordinates: 36°30′33″N 52°31′56″E
- Country: Iran
- Province: Mazandaran
- County: Babol
- District: Lalehabad
- Rural District: Karipey

Population (2016)
  - Total: 781
- Time zone: UTC+3:30 (IRST)

Halal Kola (Persian: هلال كلا) (Note: Also romanized as Halāl Kolā) is a village in Karipey Rural District of Lalehabad District in Babol County, Mazandaran province, Iran.

== Demographics ==
=== Population ===
At the time of the 2006 National Census, the village's population was 793 in 207 households. The following census in 2011 counted 787 people in 232 households. The 2016 census measured the population of the village as 781 people in 243 households.
