= Gardanbori-ye Olya =

Gardanbori-ye Olya گردن برئ عليا
- Village
- Location within Iran
- Coordinates: 36°32′45″N 52°33′47″E
- Country: Iran
- Province: Mazandaran
- County: Babol
- Bakhsh: Lalehabad
- Rural District: Karipey

Population (2006)
  - Total: 175
- Time zone: UTC+3:30 (IRST)
  - Summer (DST): UTC+4:30 (IRDT)

Gardanbori-ye Olya (Persian: گردن برئ عليا, also Romanizeed as Gardanborī-ye ‘Olyā. Also known as Bālā Gardan Borī) is a village in Karipey Rural District, Lalehabad District, Babol County, Mazandaran Province, Iran. At the 2006 census, its population was 175, in 44 families.
