= Khatif =

Khatif (Persian: خطيف) may refer to:

- Khatif, Kerman
- Khatif, Mazandaran
