= Babalkan-e Sofla =

Babalkan-e Sofla بابلكان سفلي
- Village
- Location within Iran
- Coordinates: 36°29′34″N 52°34′15″E
- Country: Iran
- Province: Mazandaran
- County: Babol
- Bakhsh: Lalehabad
- Rural District: Lalehabad

Population (2006)
  - Total: 161
- Time zone: UTC+3:30 (IRST)
  - Summer (DST): UTC+4:30 (IRDT)

Babalkan-e Sofla (Persian: بابلكان سفلي, also Romanized as Bābalkān-e Soflá; also known as Bābalkān-e Pā’īn and Pā’īn Bābolkān) is a village in Lalehabad Rural District, Lalehabad District, Babol County, Mazandaran Province, Iran. At the 2006 census, its population was 161, in 41 families.
