= Allah Chal =

Village in Mazandaran province, Iran

Allah Chal Persian: الله چال
- Village
- Location within Iran
- Coordinates: 36°25′53″N 52°34′14″E
- Country: Iran
- Province: Mazandaran
- County: Babol
- District: Lalehabad
- Rural District: Lalehabad

Population (2016)
  - Total: 1,065
- Time zone: UTC+3:30 (IRST)

Allah Chal (Persian: الله چال) (Note: Also romanized as Āllah Chāl; also known as Aleh Chāl) is a village in Lalehabad Rural District of Lalehabad District in Babol County, Mazandaran province, Iran.

== Demographics ==
=== Population ===
At the time of the 2006 National Census, the village's population was 979 in 264 households. The following census in 2011 counted 1,021 people in 314 households. The 2016 census measured the population of the village as 1,065 people in 351 households.
