= Qassab Kola-ye Miandeh =

Village in Mazandaran province, Iran

Qassab Kola-ye Miandeh Persian: قصاب كلا ميانده
- Village
- Location within Iran
- Coordinates: 36°27′20″N 52°34′40″E
- Country: Iran
- Province: Mazandaran
- County: Babol
- District: Lalehabad
- Rural District: Lalehabad

Population (2016)
  - Total: 560
- Time zone: UTC+3:30 (IRST)

Qassab Kola-ye Miandeh (Persian: قصاب كلا ميانده) (Note: Also romanized as Qaşşāb Kolā-ye Mīāndeh; also known as Qaşşāb Kolā) is a village in Lalehabad Rural District of Lalehabad District in Babol County, Mazandaran province, Iran.

== Demographics ==
=== Population ===
At the time of the 2006 National Census, the village's population was 493 in 121 households. The following census in 2011 counted 485 people in 141 households. The 2016 census measured the population of the village as 560 people in 169 households.
