= Esterdikola =

Village in Mazandaran province, Iran

Esterdikola Persian: استرديكلا
- Village
- Location within Iran
- Coordinates: 36°31′30″N 52°44′22″E
- Country: Iran
- Province: Mazandaran
- County: Babol
- District: Central
- Rural District: Feyziyeh

Population (2016)
  - Total: 680
- Time zone: UTC+3:30 (IRST)

Esterdikola (Persian: استرديكلا) (Note: Also romanized as Esterdīkolā; also known as Estedīr Kolā) is a village in Feyziyeh Rural District of the Central District in Babol County, Mazandaran province, Iran.

== Demographics ==
=== Population ===
At the time of the 2006 National Census, the village's population was 645 in 167 households. The following census in 2011 counted 634 people in 191 households. The 2016 census measured the population of the village as 680 people in 238 households.
