= Rowshanabad, Mazandaran =

Village in Mazandaran province, Iran

Rowshanabad Persian: روشن اباد
- Village
- Location within Iran
- Coordinates: 36°29′08″N 52°41′40″E
- Country: Iran
- Province: Mazandaran
- County: Babol
- District: Central
- Rural District: Ganj Afruz

Population (2016)
  - Total: 3,634
- Time zone: UTC+3:30 (IRST)

Rowshanabad (Persian: روشن‌آباد) (Note: Also romanized as Rowshanābād; also known as Rowshanābād-e Bālā) is a village in Ganj Afruz Rural District of the Central District in Babol County, Mazandaran province, Iran.

== Demographics ==
=== Population ===
At the time of the 2006 National Census, the village's population was 3,773 in 989 households. The following census in 2011 counted 3,825 people in 1,095 households. The 2016 census measured the population of the village as 3,634 people in 1,154 households.
