= Pain Bisheh Sar =

Village in Mazandaran province, Iran

Pain Bisheh Sar Persian: پائين بيشه سر
- Village
- Location within Iran
- Coordinates: 36°36′16″N 52°43′22″E
- Country: Iran
- Province: Mazandaran
- County: Babol
- District: Central
- Rural District: Feyziyeh

Population (2016)
  - Total: 3,098
- Time zone: UTC+3:30 (IRST)

Pain Bisheh Sar (Persian: پائين بيشه سر) (Note: Also romanized as Pā’īn Bīsheh Sar; also known as Bīsheh Sar Pā’īn) is a village in Feyziyeh Rural District of the Central District in Babol County, Mazandaran province, Iran.

== Demographics ==
=== Population ===
At the time of the 2006 National Census, the village's population was 2,849 in 739 households. The following census in 2011 counted 3,173 people in 936 households. The 2016 census measured the population of the village as 3,098 people in 1,039 households. It was the most populous village in its rural district.
