= Marzbal =

Village in Mazandaran province, Iran

Marzbal Persian: مرزبال
- Village
- Location within Iran
- Coordinates: 36°32′32″N 52°34′53″E
- Country: Iran
- Province: Mazandaran
- County: Babol
- District: Lalehabad
- Rural District: Karipey

Population (2016)
  - Total: 630
- Time zone: UTC+3:30 (IRST)

Marzbal (Persian: مرزبال) (Note: Also romanized as Marzbāl) is a village in Karipey Rural District of Lalehabad District in Babol County, Mazandaran province, Iran.

== Demographics ==
=== Population ===
At the time of the 2006 National Census, the village's population was 593 in 149 households. The following census in 2011 counted 571 people in 175 households. The 2016 census measured the population of the village as 630 people in 208 households.
