= Aktij Kola =

Village in Mazandaran province, Iran

Aktij Kola Persian: اكتيج كلا
- Village
- Location within Iran
- Coordinates: 36°28′32″N 52°34′42″E
- Country: Iran
- Province: Mazandaran
- County: Babol
- District: Lalehabad
- Rural District: Lalehabad

Population (2016)
  - Total: 763
- Time zone: UTC+3:30 (IRST)

Aktij Kola (Persian: اكتيج كلا) (Note: Also romanized as Āktīj Kolā) is a village in Lalehabad Rural District of Lalehabad District in Babol County, Mazandaran province, Iran.

== Demographics ==
=== Population ===
At the time of the 2006 National Census, the village's population was 742 in 178 households. The following census in 2011 counted 760 people in 211 households. The 2016 census measured the population of the village as 763 people in 240 households.
