= Kalhu Dasht-e Pain =

Kalhu Dasht-e Pain كلهودشت پائين
- Village
- Location within Iran
- Coordinates: 36°32′33″N 52°47′44″E
- Country: Iran
- Province: Mazandaran
- County: Babol
- Bakhsh: Central
- Rural District: Feyziyeh

Population (2016)
  - Total: 374
- Time zone: UTC+3:30 (IRST)

Kalhu Dasht-e Pain (Persian: كلهودشت پائين, also Romanized as Kalhū Dasht-e Pā’īn) is a village in Feyziyeh Rural District, in the Central District of Babol County, Mazandaran Province, Iran.

At the time of the 2006 National Census, the village's population was 342 in 93 households. The following census in 2011 counted 344 people in 107 households. The 2016 census measured the population of the village as 374 people in 133 households.
