= Miandasteh =

Village in Mazandaran province, Iran

Miandasteh Persian: مياندسته
- Village
- Location within Iran
- Coordinates: 36°31′59″N 52°33′18″E
- Country: Iran
- Province: Mazandaran
- County: Babol
- District: Lalehabad
- Rural District: Karipey

Population (2016)
  - Total: 512
- Time zone: UTC+3:30 (IRST)

Miandasteh (Persian: مياندسته) (Note: Also romanized as Mīāndasteh; also known as Mīān Dasteh-ye Jalāl Arzak) is a village in Karipey Rural District of Lalehabad District in Babol County, Mazandaran province, Iran.

== Demographics ==
=== Population ===
At the time of the 2006 National Census, the village's population was 600 in 145 households. The following census in 2011 counted 567 people in 157 households. The 2016 census measured the population of the village as 512 people in 169 households.
