= Allah Rudbar =

Village in Mazandaran province, Iran

Allah Rudbar Persian: الله رودبار
- Village
- Location within Iran
- Coordinates: 36°29′12″N 52°38′21″E
- Country: Iran
- Province: Mazandaran
- County: Babol
- District: Central
- Rural District: Esbu Kola

Population (2016)
  - Total: 1,502
- Time zone: UTC+3:30 (IRST)

Allah Rudbar (Persian: الله رودبار) (Note: Also romanized as Allāh Rūdbār; also known as Aleh Rudbar (اله رودبار), also romanized as Ale Rūdbār and Aleh Rūdbār) is a village in Esbu Kola Rural District of the Central District in Babol County, Mazandaran province, Iran. Most of the village's people are farmers, and some work in the city of Babol. There is a rose garden here that is visited by many people every year.

== Demographics ==
=== Population ===
At the time of the 2006 National Census, the village's population was 1,608 in 390 households. The following census in 2011 counted 1,643 people in 449 households. The 2016 census measured the population of the village as 1,502 people in 494 households.
