= Qasab-e Zalkan =

Village in Mazandaran province, Iran

Qasab-e Zalkan Persian: قصاب ذالكان
- Village
- Country: Iran
- Province: Mazandaran
- County: Babol
- District: Central
- Rural District: Esbu Kola

Population (2016)
  - Total: 505
- Time zone: UTC+3:30 (IRST)

Qasab-e Zalkan (Persian: قصاب ذالكان) (Note: Also romanized as Qaşāb-e Z̄ālkān) is a village in Esbu Kola Rural District of the Central District in Babol County, Mazandaran province, Iran.

== Demographics ==
=== Population ===
At the time of the 2006 National Census, the village's population was 432 in 120 households. The following census in 2011 counted 416 people in 137 households. The 2016 census measured the population of the village as 505 people in 185 households.
