= Aqa Malek =

Village in Mazandaran province, Iran

Aqa Malek Persian: اقاملك
- Village
- Location within Iran
- Coordinates: 36°27′24″N 52°34′06″E
- Country: Iran
- Province: Mazandaran
- County: Babol
- District: Lalehabad
- Rural District: Lalehabad

Population (2016)
  - Total: 1,370
- Time zone: UTC+3:30 (IRST)

Aqa Malek (Persian: اقاملك) (Note: Also romanized as Āqā Malek, Aqa Molk, and Āqā Molk) is a village in Lalehabad Rural District of Lalehabad District in Babol County, Mazandaran province, Iran.

== Demographics ==
=== Population ===
At the time of the 2006 National Census, the village's population was 1,298 in 351 households. The following census in 2011 counted 1,336 people in 441 households. The 2016 census measured the population of the village as 1,370 people in 459 households.
