= Zahed Kola, Babol =

Village in Mazandaran province, Iran

Zahed Kola Persian: زاهدكلا
- Village
- Location within Iran
- Coordinates: 36°26′38″N 52°31′23″E
- Country: Iran
- Province: Mazandaran
- County: Babol
- District: Lalehabad
- Rural District: Lalehabad

Population (2016)
  - Total: 556
- Time zone: UTC+3:30 (IRST)

Zahed Kola (Persian: زاهدكلا) (Note: Also romanized as Zāhed Kolā) is a village in Lalehabad Rural District of Lalehabad District in Babol County, Mazandaran province, Iran.

== Demographics ==
=== Population ===
At the time of the 2006 National Census, the village's population was 570 in 149 households. The following census in 2011 counted 531 people in 157 households. The 2016 census measured the population of the village as 556 people in 175 households.
