= Bala Bazyar =

Village in Mazandaran province, Iran

Bala Bazyar Persian: بالابازيار
- Village
- Location within Iran
- Coordinates: 36°24′48″N 52°31′45″E
- Country: Iran
- Province: Mazandaran
- County: Babol
- District: Lalehabad
- Rural District: Lalehabad

Population (2016)
  - Total: 947
- Time zone: UTC+3:30 (IRST)

Bala Bazyar (Persian: بالابازيار) (Note: Also romanized as Bālā Bāzīār and Bālā Bāzyār; also known as Bāzyār-e Bālā) is a village in Lalehabad Rural District of Lalehabad District in Babol County, Mazandaran province, Iran.

== Demographics ==
=== Population ===
At the time of the 2006 National Census, the village's population was 1,021 in 317 households. The following census in 2011 counted 1,195 people in 381 households. The 2016 census measured the population of the village as 947 people in 328 households.
