= Delavar Kola =

Delavar Kola (Persian: دلاوركلا) may refer to:

- Delavar Kola, Gatab
- Delavar Kola, Lalehabad
