= Darzi Kola-ye Bozorg =

Village in Mazandaran province, Iran

Darzi Kola-ye Bozorg Persian: درزيكلابزرگ
- Village
- Location within Iran
- Coordinates: 36°29′43″N 52°31′21″E
- Country: Iran
- Province: Mazandaran
- County: Babol
- District: Lalehabad
- Rural District: Karipey

Population (2016)
  - Total: 627
- Time zone: UTC+3:30 (IRST)

Darzi Kola-ye Bozorg (Persian: درزيكلابزرگ) (Note: Also romanized as Darzī Kolā-ye Bozorg) is a village in Karipey Rural District of Lalehabad District in Babol County, Mazandaran province, Iran.

== Demographics ==
=== Population ===
At the time of the 2006 National Census, the village's population was 765 in 204 households. The following census in 2011 counted 818 people in 225 households. The 2016 census measured the population of the village as 627 people in 214 households.
