= Kapur Chal, Mazandaran =

Village in Mazandaran province, Iran

Kapur Chal Persian: كپورچال
- Village
- Location within Iran
- Coordinates: 36°32′57″N 52°46′27″E
- Country: Iran
- Province: Mazandaran
- County: Babol
- District: Central
- Rural District: Feyziyeh

Population (2016)
  - Total: 542
- Time zone: UTC+3:30 (IRST)

Kapur Chal (Persian: كپورچال) (Note: Also romanized as Kapūr Chāl) is a village in Feyziyeh Rural District of the Central District in Babol County, Mazandaran province, Iran.

== Demographics ==
=== Population ===
At the time of the 2006 National Census, the village's population was 504 in 144 households. The following census in 2011 counted 513 people in 172 households. The 2016 census measured the population of the village as 542 people in 187 households.
