= Darvish Khak-e Bala =

Village in Mazandaran province, Iran

Darvish Khak-e Bala Persian: درويش خاك بالا
- Village
- Location within Iran
- Coordinates: 36°29′41″N 52°37′02″E
- Country: Iran
- Province: Mazandaran
- County: Babol
- District: Central
- Rural District: Esbu Kola

Population (2016)
  - Total: 782
- Time zone: UTC+3:30 (IRST)

Darvish Khak-e Bala (Persian: درويش خاك بالا) (Note: Also romanized as Darvīsh Khāk-e Bālā; also known as Bālā Darvīsh Khāk and Darvīsh Khāk) is a village in Esbu Kola Rural District of the Central District in Babol County, Mazandaran province, Iran.

== Demographics ==
=== Population ===
At the time of the 2006 National Census, the village's population was 668 in 161 households. The following census in 2011 counted 750 people in 209 households. The 2016 census measured the population of the village as 782 people in 264 households.
