= Esbu Kola, Babol =

Village in Mazandaran province, Iran

Esbu Kola Persian: اسبوكلا
- Village
- Location within Iran
- Coordinates: 36°29′46″N 52°36′04″E
- Country: Iran
- Province: Mazandaran
- County: Babol
- District: Central
- Rural District: Esbu Kola

Population (2016)
  - Total: 2,693
- Time zone: UTC+3:30 (IRST)
- Website: www.matikola.ir

Esbu Kola (Persian: اسبوكلا) (Note: Also romanized as Esbū Kolā) is a village in, and the capital of, Esbu Kola Rural District in the Central District of Babol County, Mazandaran province, Iran.

== Demographics ==
=== Population ===
At the time of the 2006 National Census, the village's population was 2,544 in 651 households. The following census in 2011 counted 2,619 people in 773 households. The 2016 census measured the population of the village as 2,693 people in 872 households.
