= Shareh, Mazandaran =

Village in Mazandaran province, Iran

Shareh Persian: شاره
- Village
- Location within Iran
- Coordinates: 36°35′50″N 52°34′20″E
- Country: Iran
- Province: Mazandaran
- County: Babol
- District: Lalehabad
- Rural District: Karipey

Population (2016)
  - Total: 828
- Time zone: UTC+3:30 (IRST)

Shareh (Persian: شاره) (Note: Also romanized as Shāreh) is a village in Karipey Rural District of Lalehabad District in Babol County, Mazandaran province, Iran.

== Demographics ==
=== Population ===
At the time of the 2006 National Census, the village's population was 844 in 204 households. The following census in 2011 counted 839 people in 242 households. The 2016 census measured the population of the village as 828 people in 268 households.
