= Langur, Mazandaran =

Village in Mazandaran province, Iran

Langur Persian: لنگور
- Village
- Location within Iran
- Coordinates: 36°36′57″N 52°44′38″E
- Country: Iran
- Province: Mazandaran
- County: Babol
- District: Central
- Rural District: Feyziyeh

Population (2016)
  - Total: 1,063
- Time zone: UTC+3:30 (IRST)

Langur (Persian: لنگور) (Note: Also romanized as Langūr; formerly known as Langur-e Pain (لنگورپائين), also romanized as Langūr-e Pā’īn; also known as Langūre-e Pā’īn and Pā’īn Langūr) is a village in Feyziyeh Rural District of the Central District in Babol County, Mazandaran province, Iran.

== Demographics ==
=== Population ===
At the time of the 2006 National Census, the village's population, as Langur-e Pain, was 663 in 162 households. The following census in 2011 counted 1,068 people in 327 households, by which time the village merged with Langur-e Bala and became Langur. The 2016 census measured the population of the village as 1,063 people in 348 households.
