= Pain Karu Kola =

Village in Mazandaran province, Iran

Pain Karu Kola Persian: پائين كروكلا
- Village
- Location within Iran
- Coordinates: 36°29′45″N 52°33′37″E
- Country: Iran
- Province: Mazandaran
- County: Babol
- District: Lalehabad
- Rural District: Karipey

Population (2016)
  - Total: 599
- Time zone: UTC+3:30 (IRST)

Pain Karu Kola (Persian: پائين كروكلا) (Note: Also romanized as Pā’īn Karū Kolā) is a village in Karipey Rural District of Lalehabad District in Babol County, Mazandaran province, Iran.

== Demographics ==
=== Population ===
At the time of the 2006 National Census, the village's population was 551 in 146 households. The following census in 2011 counted 591 people in 176 households. The 2016 census measured the population of the village as 599 people in 197 households.
