= Biji Kola =

Village in Mazandaran province, Iran

Biji Kola Persian: بيجي كلا
- Village
- Location within Iran
- Coordinates: 36°32′12″N 52°32′41″E
- Country: Iran
- Province: Mazandaran
- County: Babol
- District: Lalehabad
- Rural District: Karipey

Population (2016)
  - Total: 1,088
- Time zone: UTC+3:30 (IRST)

Biji Kola (Persian: بيجي كلا) (Note: Also Romanized as Bījī Kolā; also known as Bejī Kolā and Bījā Kalā) is a village in Karipey Rural District of Lalehabad District in Babol County, Mazandaran province, Iran.

== Demographics ==
=== Population ===
At the time of the 2006 National Census, the village's population was 1,027 in 263 households. The following census in 2011 counted 1,023 people in 310 households. The 2016 census measured the population of the village as 1,088 people in 332 households.
