= Pain Bazyar =

Village in Mazandaran province, Iran

Pain Bazyar Persian: پايين بازيار
- Village
- Location within Iran
- Coordinates: 36°25′17″N 52°31′58″E
- Country: Iran
- Province: Mazandaran
- County: Babol
- District: Lalehabad
- Rural District: Lalehabad

Population (2016)
  - Total: 1,279
- Time zone: UTC+3:30 (IRST)

Pain Bazyar (Persian: پايين بازيار) (Note: Also romanized as Pā’īn Bazeyār, Pā’īn Bazīār, Pā’īn Bāzīār, and Pā’īn Bazyār; also known as Bāzyār-e Pā’īn) is a village in Lalehabad Rural District of Lalehabad District in Babol County, Mazandaran province, Iran.

== Demographics ==
=== Population ===
At the time of the 2006 National Census, the village's population was 1,345 in 350 households. The following census in 2011 counted 1,362 people in 462 households. The 2016 census measured the population of the village as 1,279 people in 425 households.
