= Kapur Chal =

Kapur Chal or Kapurchal or Kopur Chal (Persian: كپورچال) may refer to:

- Kapurchal, Gilan
- Kapur Chal, Mazandaran
