= Laluk =

Laluk (Persian: للوك) may refer to:

- Laluk, Babol
- Laluk, Savadkuh
- Laluk, Assam, India
