= Bala Ahmad Chaleh Pey =

Village in Mazandaran province, Iran

Bala Ahmad Chaleh Pey Persian: بالااحمدچاله پي
- Village
- Location within Iran
- Coordinates: 36°27′23″N 52°32′54″E
- Country: Iran
- Province: Mazandaran
- County: Babol
- District: Lalehabad
- Rural District: Lalehabad

Population (2016)
  - Total: 1,733
- Time zone: UTC+3:30 (IRST)

Bala Ahmad Chaleh Pey (Persian: بالااحمدچاله پي) (Note: Also romanized as Bālā Aḩmad Chāleh Pey) is a village in Lalehabad Rural District of Lalehabad District in Babol County, Mazandaran province, Iran.

== Demographics ==
=== Population ===
At the time of the 2006 National Census, the village's population was 1,538 in 412 households. The following census in 2011 counted 1,631 people in 499 households. The 2016 census measured the population of the village as 1,733 people in 563 households.
