= Archi, Iran =

Village in Mazandaran province, Iran

Archi Persian: ارچي
- Village
- Location within Iran
- Coordinates: 36°35′38″N 52°35′22″E
- Country: Iran
- Province: Mazandaran
- County: Babol
- District: Lalehabad
- Rural District: Karipey

Population (2016)
  - Total: 643
- Time zone: UTC+3:30 (IRST)

Archi (Persian: ارچي) (Note: Also romanized as Archī and Arechī) is a village in Karipey Rural District of Lalehabad District in Babol County, Mazandaran province, Iran.

== Demographics ==
=== Population ===
At the time of the 2006 National Census, the village's population was 668 in 172 households. The following census in 2011 counted 640 people in 203 households. The 2016 census measured the population of the village as 643 people in 206 households.
