= Arechi =

Arechi may refer to:

- Archi, Iran, a village in Karipey Rural District, Lalehabad District, Babol County, Mazandaran Province, Iran
- Arechis I of Benevento (died 641), duke of Benevento
- Arechis II of Benevento (died 787), duke of Benevento
- Stadio Arechi, a multi-purpose stadium in Salerno, Italy, named after Arechis II of Benevento
- Arechi, a Japanese literary journal; see Ryūichi Tamura
