= Darzi Kola-ye Karim Kola =

Village in Mazandaran province, Iran

Darzi Kola-ye Karim Kola Persian: درزيكلاكريم كلا
- Village
- Location within Iran
- Coordinates: 36°35′15″N 52°33′32″E
- Country: Iran
- Province: Mazandaran
- County: Babol
- District: Lalehabad
- Rural District: Karipey

Population (2016)
  - Total: 527
- Time zone: UTC+3:30 (IRST)

Darzi Kola-ye Karim Kola (Persian: درزيكلاكريم كلا) (Note: Also romanized as Darzī Kolā-ye Karīm Kolā; also known as Darzī Kolā) is a village in Karipey Rural District of Lalehabad District in Babol County, Mazandaran province, Iran.

== Demographics ==
=== Population ===
At the time of the 2006 National Census, the village's population was 494 in 117 households. The following census in 2011 counted 493 people in 143 households. The 2016 census measured the population of the village as 527 people in 177 households.
