= Pain Ahmad Chaleh Pey =

Village in Mazandaran province, Iran

Pain Ahmad Chaleh Pey Persian: پائين احمد چاله پي
- Village
- Location within Iran
- Coordinates: 36°28′10″N 52°33′47″E
- Country: Iran
- Province: Mazandaran
- County: Babol
- District: Lalehabad
- Rural District: Lalehabad

Population (2016)
  - Total: 1,875
- Time zone: UTC+3:30 (IRST)

Pain Ahmad Chaleh Pey (Persian: پائين احمدچاله پي) (Note: Also romanized as Pā’īn Aḩmad Chāleh Pey; also known as Anjelibei, Pā’īn Aḩmad, Pā’īn Aḩmad Chāl Pey, and Pā’īn Chāl) is a village in, and the capital of, Lalehabad Rural District in Lalehabad District of Babol County, Mazandaran province, Iran.

== Demographics ==
=== Population ===
At the time of the 2006 National Census, the village's population was 1,684 in 445 households. The following census in 2011 counted 1,929 people in 580 households. The 2016 census measured the population of the village as 1,875 people in 608 households. It was the most populous village in its rural district.
