= Barik Kola =

Village in Mazandaran province, Iran

Barik Kola Persian: باریک كلا
- Village
- Location within Iran
- Coordinates: 36°35′06″N 52°39′38″E
- Country: Iran
- Province: Mazandaran
- County: Babol
- District: Central
- Rural District: Feyziyeh

Population (2016)
  - Total: 1,098
- Time zone: UTC+3:30 (IRST)

Barik Kola (Persian: باریک كلا) (Note: Also romanized as Bārīk Kalā and Bārīk Kolā) is a village in Feyziyeh Rural District of the Central District in Babol County, Mazandaran province, Iran.

== Demographics ==
=== Population ===
At the time of the 2006 National Census, the village's population was 969 in 238 households. The following census in 2011 counted 980 people in 281 households. The 2016 census measured the population of the village as 1,098 people in 348 households.
