= Bala Karu Kola =

Village in Mazandaran province, Iran

Bala Karu Kola Persian: بالاكروكلا
- Village
- Location within Iran
- Coordinates: 36°29′43″N 52°33′18″E
- Country: Iran
- Province: Mazandaran
- County: Babol
- District: Lalehabad
- Rural District: Karipey

Population (2016)
  - Total: 437
- Time zone: UTC+3:30 (IRST)

Bala Karu Kola (Persian: بالاكروكلا) (Note: Also romanized as Bālā Karū Kolā, Bala Keru Kola, and Bālā Kerū Kolā; also known as Kerū Kolā) is a village in Karipey Rural District of Lalehabad District in Babol County, Mazandaran province, Iran.

== Demographics ==
=== Population ===
At the time of the 2006 National Census, the village's population was 470 in 121 households. The following census in 2011 counted 452 people in 150 households. The 2016 census measured the population of the village as 437 people in 152 households.
