= Marzunabad-e Darvish Kheyl =

Village in Mazandaran province, Iran

Marzunabad-e Darvish Kheyl Persian: مرزون آباد درويش خيل
- Village
- Location within Iran
- Coordinates: 36°33′57″N 52°38′39″E
- Country: Iran
- Province: Mazandaran
- County: Babol
- District: Central
- Rural District: Feyziyeh

Population (2016)
  - Total: 1,303
- Time zone: UTC+3:30 (IRST)

Marzunabad-e Darvish Kheyl (Persian: مرزون آباد درويش خيل) (Note: Also romanized as Marzūnābād-e Darvīsh Kheyl and Marzūnābād-e Darvīsh Khīl; formerly known as Darvish Khak-e Marzun (درويش خاك مرزون), also romanized as Darvīsh Khāk-e Marzūn) is a village in Feyziyeh Rural District of the Central District in Babol County, Mazandaran province, Iran.

== Demographics ==
=== Population ===
At the time of the 2006 National Census, the village's population, as Darvish Khak-e Marzun, was 1,169 in 285 households. The following census in 2011 counted 1,191 people in 345 households. The 2016 census measured the population of the village as 1,303 people in 426 households, by which time the village was listed as Marzunabad-e Darvish Kheyl.
