= Delavar Kola, Lalehabad =

Village in Mazandaran province, Iran

Delavar Kola Persian: دلاوركلا
- Village
- Location within Iran
- Coordinates: 36°26′43″N 52°32′54″E
- Country: Iran
- Province: Mazandaran
- County: Babol
- District: Lalehabad
- Rural District: Lalehabad

Population (2016)
  - Total: 764
- Time zone: UTC+3:30 (IRST)

Delavar Kola (Persian: دلاوركلا) (Note: Also romanized as Delāvar Kolā; also known as Delāvar Kolā-ye Pā’īn) is a village in Lalehabad Rural District of Lalehabad District in Babol County, Mazandaran province, Iran.

== Demographics ==
=== Population ===
At the time of the 2006 National Census, the village's population was 791 in 227 households. The following census in 2011 counted 822 people in 260 households. The 2016 census measured the population of the village as 764 people in 247 households.
