= Ganj Afruz Rural District =

Rural district in Mazandaran province, Iran

Ganj Afruz Rural District Persian: دهستان گنج افروز
- Rural District
- Location within Iran
- Coordinates: 36°28′N 52°43′E
- Country: Iran
- Province: Mazandaran
- County: Babol
- District: Central
- Established: 1987
- Capital: Pain Ganj Afruz

Population (2016)
  - Total: 23,024
- Time zone: UTC+3:30 (IRST)

Ganj Afruz Rural District (Persian: دهستان گنج افروز) is in the Central District of Babol County, Mazandaran province, Iran. Its capital is the village of Pain Ganj Afruz.

== Demographics ==
=== Population ===
At the time of the 2006 National Census, the rural district's population was 22,792 in 6,095 households. There were 23,480 inhabitants in 7,094 households at the following census of 2011. The 2016 census measured the population of the rural district as 23,024 in 7,615 households. The most populous of its 11 villages was Pain Ganj Afruz, with 4,945 people.

=== Other villages in the rural district ===
- Alamdar
- Chareh
- Div Dasht
- Hari Kandeh
- Hatkeh Posht
- Mir Rud Posht
- Naqib Kola-ye Salas
- Rowshanabad
- Siah Kola Mahalleh
- Taraji Kola
