= Zargar, Babol =

City in Mazandaran province, Iran

Zargar Persian: زرگر
- City
- Location within Iran
- Coordinates: 36°30′59″N 52°34′28″E
- Country: Iran
- Province: Mazandaran
- County: Babol
- District: Lalehabad

Population (2016)
  - Total: 3,991
- Time zone: UTC+3:30 (IRST)

Zargar (Persian: زرگر) (Note: Formerly Zargarmahalleh (زرگرمحله),) is a city in, and the capital of, Lalehabad District in Babol County, Mazandaran province, Iran. It is also the administrative center for Karipey Rural District.

== Demographics ==
=== Population ===
At the time of the 2006 National Census, the city's population (as Zargarmahalleh) was 425 in 110 households. The following census in 2011 counted 423 people in 127 households. The 2016 census measured the population of the city as 3,991 people in 1,311 households. The city was renamed Zargar in 2021.
