= Kati Sar, Bandpey-ye Sharqi =

Kati Sar كتي سر
- Village
- Location within Iran
- Coordinates: 36°20′42″N 52°38′31″E
- Country: Iran
- Province: Mazandaran
- County: Babol
- Bakhsh: Bandpey-ye Sharqi
- Rural District: Sajjadrud

Population (2006)
  - Total: 215
- Time zone: UTC+3:30 (IRST)
  - Summer (DST): UTC+4:30 (IRDT)

Kati Sar (Persian: كتي سر, also Romanized as Katī Sar) is a village in Sajjadrud Rural District, Bandpey-ye Sharqi District, Babol County, Mazandaran Province, Iran. At the 2006 census, its population was 215, in 55 families.
