= Langor =

Langor may refer to:

- Langor Island, in the Marshall Islands
- Langor Township, Minnesota, in the United States

== See also ==
- Langore, a village in England
- Langour
- Langur (disambiguation)
