= Khatib, Mazandaran =

Village in Mazandaran province, Iran

Khatib Persian: خطيب
- Village
- Location within Iran
- Coordinates: 36°26′33″N 52°30′10″E
- Country: Iran
- Province: Mazandaran
- County: Babol
- District: Lalehabad
- Rural District: Lalehabad

Population (2016)
  - Total: 611
- Time zone: UTC+3:30 (IRST)

Khatib (Persian: خطيب) (Note: Also romanized as Khaţīb; also known as Khaţīf) is a village in Lalehabad Rural District of Lalehabad District in Babol County, Mazandaran province, Iran.

== Demographics ==
=== Population ===
At the time of the 2006 National Census, the village's population was 568 in 144 households. The following census in 2011 counted 596 people in 173 households. The 2016 census measured the population of the village as 611 people in 192 households.
