= Darzi Kola-ye Aqa Shafi =

Village in Mazandaran province, Iran

Darzi Kola-ye Aqa Shafi Persian: درزيكلااقاشفيع
- Village
- Location within Iran
- Coordinates: 36°26′32″N 52°34′08″E
- Country: Iran
- Province: Mazandaran
- County: Babol
- District: Lalehabad
- Rural District: Lalehabad

Population (2016)
  - Total: 937
- Time zone: UTC+3:30 (IRST)

Darzi Kola-ye Aqa Shafi (Persian: درزيكلااقاشفيع) (Note: Also romanized as Darzī Kolā-ye Āqā Shafī‘; also known as Āqā Shafī‘) is a village in Lalehabad Rural District of Lalehabad District in Babol County, Mazandaran province, Iran.

== Demographics ==
=== Population ===
At the time of the 2006 National Census, the village's population was 1,022 in 258 households. The following census in 2011 counted 1,013 people in 317 households. The 2016 census measured the population of the village as 937 people in 336 households.
