= Deh-e Aqa Shafi =

Deh-e Aqa Shafi ده اقاشفيع
- Village
- Location within Iran
- Coordinates: 30°44′16″N 51°31′25″E
- Country: Iran
- Province: Kohgiluyeh and Boyer-Ahmad
- County: Boyer-Ahmad
- Bakhsh: Central
- Rural District: Sarrud-e Shomali

Population (2006)
  - Total: 299
- Time zone: UTC+3:30 (IRST)
  - Summer (DST): UTC+4:30 (IRDT)

Deh-e Aqa Shafi (Persian: ده اقاشفيع, also Romanizeed as Deh-e Āqā Shafī‘; also known as Āqā Shafī‘) is a village in Sarrud-e Shomali Rural District, in the Central District of Boyer-Ahmad County, Kohgiluyeh and Boyer-Ahmad Province, Iran. At the 2006 census, its population was 299, in 61 families.
