= Khatib, Saudi Arabia =

Khatib
- Village
- Location in Saudi Arabia
- Coordinates: 16°53′46″N 41°51′27″E
- Country: Saudi Arabia
- Province: Jizan Province
- Time zone: UTC+3 (EAT)
  - Summer (DST): UTC+3 (EAT)

Khatib is a village in Jizan Province, in south-western Saudi Arabia, in the Arabian Sea.
