= Reza Khatibi =

Iranian filmmaker (born 1969)

- رضا خطیبی
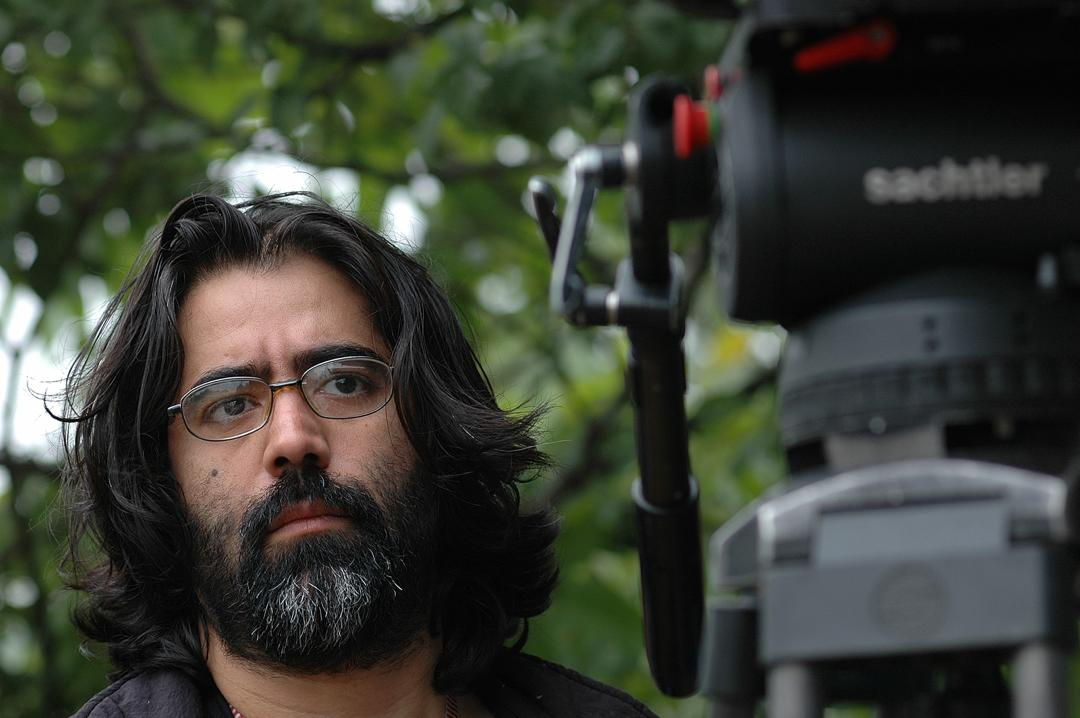
- Born: Tahran, Iran
- Other name: Reza
- Occupations: Director & Screenwriter
- Years active: 2002–present

Reza Khatibi (Persian: رضا خطیبی) is an Iranian filmmaker.

== Biography ==
At 16 he moves to France for secondary schooling. Fascinated by the silver screen he enters the artistic scene by joining the "Théatre de l'Atelier", directed by Jean Darnel. As he learns the ropes and forms a group of aficionados, he eventually directs his first short film, "l'enfer". Satisfied by the results the group of actors joined him for his second short film, "le tourbillon".

In 2002, he directs his first feature film, "7 Days in Teheran", with his friends from the theatre. The movie was produced by Jean-Marie Boulet from "Artefilm" and co-written by Reza Khatibi, Esfandiar Esfandi and Anahita Maafi. Released in France in 2002 the movie quickly gathered praise from international movie festivals. It won the Viewer's Choice award at the Bergamo Film Meeting in Italy and was acclaimed at the Fajr festival in 2003.

Finding inspiration in the Cohen brothers' "The Big Lebowski", Reza Khatibi writes and directs in 2007 "Dar shahr khabari nist, hast". The movie was cowritten with Hadi Hossein Nejad and produced by Mostafa Shayeste from Hedayat Film.

In 2009 he cowrites with Mehdi Hossein Nejad "L'enclave", the first Iranian fantastic thriller. It was nominated at the Amiens festival in France. The movie he directed and cowrote with Behrooz Forooghi in 2016, "A Hell of a Wedding", brings him some fame. It is the first 3D Iranian movie. It received two awards, the Grand Prix at the Lieges 3D festival as well as the jury's prize at the Korean international 3D film festival.

== Filmography ==
=== Cinema ===
- 2002: 7 Days in Tehran
- 2007: Dar shahr khabari nist
- 2009: L'enclave
- 2016: Brawl in the Wedding
