= Beji (cookie) =

Kurdish cookie

- Alternative names: Bersagh
- Type: Pastry
- Place of origin: Iran
- Region or state: Kermanshah, Ilam and Kurdistan
- Main ingredients: Flour، Oil

Beji, Berji, Peshi, or Bersaq (Southern Kurdish: بژی Bijî; برژی Birjî; برساق Birsaq, Gurani: پشی Pişî) is a traditional Kurdish pastry that is mostly prepared in Kermanshah, Ilam, Lorestan and Kurdistan Provinces. Beji is made from a combination of wheat flour and Oil. After frying, some sugar or powdered sugar is poured on it and used.

== Recipes ==
Beji is made from wheat flour, sugar, oil, eggs, milk, cumin, fennel and turmeric. All ingredients are mixed together and fried in oil and garnished with sugar.

== Name ==
The word beji or berji (Southern Kurdish: بژی Bijî; برژی Birjî) is derived from the infinitive Berjanen (Southern Kurdish: برژانن Birjanin), which in southern Kurdish means toasting, and Beji or Berji means toasted. This is also the case with Peshi (Gurani: پشی Pişî), which is derived from the Horami infinitive Peshaney (Gurani: پشانەی Pişaney). Also, "bersaq" is the arabized of the Southern Kurdish word Berjiag/Bershiag (Sorani Kurdish: برژیاگ Birjiyag; برشیاگ Birşiyag), which is a past participle meaning "toasted".
