= Darzi Kola, Savadkuh =

Darzi Kola درزيكلا
- village
- Location within Iran
- Coordinates: 36°13′02″N 52°43′59″E
- Country: Iran
- Province: Mazandaran
- County: North Savadkuh
- Rural District: Lafur

Population (2016)
  - Total: 72
- Time zone: UTC+3:30 (IRST)

Darzi Kola (Persian: درزيكلا, also Romanized as Darzī Kolā) is a village in Lafur Rural District, North Savadkuh County, Mazandaran Province, Iran. At the 2016 census, its population was 72, in 28 families. Increased from 16 people in 2006.
