= Esbu Kola, Savadkuh =

Esbu Kola اسبوكلا
- village
- Location within Iran
- Coordinates: 36°12′21″N 52°48′24″E
- Country: Iran
- Province: Mazandaran
- County: North Savadkuh
- Rural District: Lafur

Population (2016)
  - Total: 14
- Time zone: UTC+3:30 (IRST)

Esbu Kola (Persian: اسبوكلا, also Romanized as Esbū Kolā; also known as Esmū Kolā) is a village in Lafur Rural District, North Savadkuh County, Mazandaran Province, Iran. At the 2016 census, its population was 14, in 7 families. Decreased from 43 people in 2006.

== History ==
The completion of the Alborz (Lefur) Dam in 1997 resulted in much of the area of the village being flooded. Most of the 120 families at the site migrated to nearby cities, leaving only a small population of people staying at the site, especially after electricity was cut off.
