= Sanam Khatibi =

Belgian artist

- Born: 1979 (age 46–47); Tehran, Iran
- Known for: Painting, sculpture, embroidery, tapestry

Sanam Khatibi (born 1979) is an Iranian-born Belgian visual artist. Her work consists of paintings, embroideries, tapestries, and sculptures. Themes of her work relate to humanity's primal instincts and animality, male-female dynamics, balance of power between the sexes, domination and submission, and fear and desire. Her works have been shown in solo and group exhibitions in Europe and the U.S. She lives and works in Brussels, Belgium.

== Work ==
Khatibi cites Frida Kahlo, Hieronymus Bosch, and Henry Darger as her sources of inspiration. Khatibi's paintings often resemble Renaissance imagery, with groups of almost transparent nude female figures against backgrounds of pastel-coloured landscapes. The ghost-like women interact with the surrounding wildlife and explore their animal impulses. Her work is seen as putting "a contemporary spin on surrealism and the uncanny."

A self-taught artist, Khatibi is described as "guided by an untamed instinct", and "each work seems to be an invitation to a sexual game, tender or brutal, romantic or savage." Khatibi explains, “No matter how much society tries to cover it up, no matter how polite and educated we act, our impulses remain primitive.”

The emotional tone of her work is considered benign, despite the underlying themes: "Along with the apparent bestiality and the violence of the depicted scenes, the artist keeps an amused eye on the joyful carnival." Furthermore, "her female subjects are presented as protagonists, not victims. They hunt, tame, or seduce the wild beasts, rather than being ravaged by them."

Khatibi says her female figures are "the predators, the dominant figures, who are quite impulsive and playful... often depicted within the same plane as the flora and fauna." A review notes that "the women have an ambiguous relationship with power, violence, sensuality, and one another." Khatibi adds that “I suppose they are all me—and they are all bits and pieces of us all.”

Her series, "The Murders of the Green River," exhibited in 2019 at the Rodolphe Janssen gallery in Brussels, examined the crimes of the serial killer Gary Ridgway in the Green River area of Washington State.

== Solo exhibitions ==
Khatibi has shown her work in various exhibitions throughout Europe and the United States. Notable solo exhibitions include:

- Séduire ou crever de faim, Island, Brussels, Belgium (2014)
- Ask me nicely, Trampoline, Antwerp, Belgium (2015)
- The hollow in the ferns, NICC Vitrine, Brussels, Belgium (2016)
- Le jardin décomposé, Super Dakota, Brussels, Belgium (2016)
- No Church in the wild, The Cabin LA, Los Angeles CA, USA (2017)
- With tendresse and longing, Billboard Series #6: Art in Public Space, Artlead, Gent, Belgium (2017)
- Rivers in your mouth, Rodolphe Janssen, Brussels, Belgium (2017)
- Wild Mink, Artlead Salon, Brussels, Belgium (2018)
- The Murders of the Green River, Rodolphe Janssen, Brussels, Belgium (2019)
- “Cruelest of the Seas” Kunsthal Ghent (2020)
- Lemon Drizzle, Groeningemuseum Bruges (2021)

== Group exhibitions ==
- Quel amour!, MAC, Musée d’Art Contemporain, Marseille, France, 2018
- NICC 20 Years Jubilee, NICC, Antwerp, Belgium, 2018
- Hecate, Various Small Fires, Los Angeles, CA, USA, 2017
- Summer in the City, Christine Konig Gallery, Vienna, Austria, 2016
- Biennial of Painting, Museum of Deinze, Deinze, Belgium, 2016
- Balls & Glory, rodolphe janssen, Brussels, Belgium, 2016
- Louise 186, Brussels Art Days, Brussels, Belgium, 2015
- Me, myself and I, trampoline, Antwerp, Belgium, 2015
- The Seventh Continent 16th Istanbul Biennial, 2019
- “The Tears of Eros: Moesman, Surrealism and the Sexes” Utrecht, 2020
