= Khatib, Tabriz =

Coordinates: 38°04′N 46°14′E

Khatib is a historic and ancient district of Tabriz, Iran. The founding of this district is attributed to Khatib Tabrizi.

== Famous people ==
- Rasoul Khatibi

== Sources ==
- Khatib^{[usurped]}
