= Khatib, Kerman =

Khatif خطيف
- village
- Location within Iran
- Coordinates: 29°29′00″N 56°35′48″E
- Country: Iran
- Province: Kerman
- County: Bardsir
- Bakhsh: Lalehzar
- Rural District: Qaleh Askar

Population (2006)
  - Total: 106
- Time zone: UTC+3:30 (IRST)
  - Summer (DST): UTC+4:30 (IRDT)

Khatif (Persian: خطيف, also Romanized as Khaṭīf; also known as Khaṭīf) is a village in Qaleh Askar Rural District, Lalehzar District, Bardsir County, Kerman Province, Iran. At the 2006 census, its population was 106, in 24 families.
