= Esbu Kola Rural District =

Rural district in Mazandaran province, Iran

Esbu Kola Rural District Persian: دهستان اسبوكلا
- Rural District
- Location within Iran
- Coordinates: 36°29′N 52°39′E
- Country: Iran
- Province: Mazandaran
- County: Babol
- District: Central
- Established: 2000
- Capital: Esbu Kola

Population (2016)
  - Total: 18,709
- Time zone: UTC+3:30 (IRST)

Esbu Kola Rural District (Persian: دهستان اسبوكلا) is in the Central District of Babol County, Mazandaran province, Iran. Its capital is the village of Esbu Kola.

== Demographics ==
=== Population ===
At the time of the 2006 National Census, the rural district's population was 16,319 in 4,197 households. There were 18,310 inhabitants in 5,016 households at the following census of 2011. The 2016 census measured the population of the rural district as 18,709 in 5,636 households. The most populous of its 22 villages was Mati Kola, with 2,902 people.

=== Other villages in the rural district ===
- Allah Rudbar
- Darvish Khak-e Bala
- Hamzeh Kola-ye Shesh Pol
- Khorasan Mahalleh
- Neqarechi Mahalleh
- Now Shirvan Kola
- Qasab-e Zalkan
- Qomi Kola
- Sadat Mahalleh
- Tork Mahalleh
