= Lalehabad Rural District =

Rural district in Mazandaran province, Iran

Lalehabad Rural District Persian: دهستان لاله‌آباد
- Rural District
- Location within Iran
- Coordinates: 36°28′N 52°34′E
- Country: Iran
- Province: Mazandaran
- County: Babol
- District: Kaki
- Established: 1987
- Capital: Pain Ahmad Chaleh Pey

Population (2016)
  - Total: 17,323
- Time zone: UTC+3:30 (IRST)

Lalehabad Rural District (Persian: دهستان لاله‌آباد) is in Lalehabad District of Babol County, Mazandaran province, Iran. Its capital is the village of Pain Ahmad Chaleh Pey.

== Demographics ==
=== Population ===
At the time of the 2006 National Census, the rural district's population was 17,197 in 4,533 households. There were 17,790 inhabitants in 5,430 households at the following census of 2011. The 2016 census measured the population of the rural district as 17,323 in 5,745 households. The most populous of its 29 villages was Pain Ahmad Chaleh Pey, with 1,875 people.

=== Other villages in the rural district ===
- Aktij Kola
- Allah Chal
- Aqa Malek
- Bala Ahmad Chaleh Pey
- Bala Bazyar
- Darzi Kola-ye Aqa Shafi
- Delavar Kola
- Khatib
- Pain Bazyar
- Qassab Kola-ye Miandeh
- Varmatun
- Zahed Kola
