= Feyziyeh Rural District =

Rural district in Mazandaran province, Iran

Feyziyeh Rural District Persian: دهستان فيضيه
- Rural District
- Location within Iran
- Coordinates: 36°34′N 52°43′E
- Country: Iran
- Province: Mazandaran
- County: Babol
- District: Central
- Established: 1987
- Capital: Soltan Mohammad-e Taher

Population (2016)
  - Total: 26,670
- Time zone: UTC+3:30 (IRST)

Feyziyeh Rural District (Persian: دهستان فيضيه) is in the Central District of Babol County, Mazandaran province, Iran. Its capital is the village of Soltan Mohammad-e Taher.

== Demographics ==
=== Population ===
At the time of the 2006 National Census, the rural district's population was 24,073 in 6,210 households. There were 25,451 inhabitants in 7,468 households at the following census of 2011. The 2016 census measured the population of the rural district as 26,670 in 8,744 households. The most populous of its 33 villages was Pain Bisheh Sar, with 3,098 people.

=== Other villages in the rural district ===
- Aghuzbon
- Bala Bisheh Sar
- Bandar Kola-ye Aghowzin
- Barik Kola
- Buleh Kola-ye Marzunabad
- Chamaz Kola
- Espi Kola-ye Ramnet
- Esterdikola
- Galleh Kola
- Gorjiabad
- Kapur Chal
- Langur
- Mansur Kandeh
- Marzunabad-e Darvish Kheyl
- Muzigaleh
- Qaemiyeh
- Ramnet
