= Karipey Rural District =

Rural district in Mazandaran province, Iran

Karipey Rural District Persian: دهستان كارئ پي
- Rural District
- Location within Iran
- Coordinates: 36°33′N 52°34′E
- Country: Iran
- Province: Mazandaran
- County: Babol
- District: Lalehabad
- Established: 1987
- Capital: Zargar

Population (2016)
  - Total: 27,828
- Time zone: UTC+3:30 (IRST)

Karipey Rural District (Persian: دهستان كارئ پي) is in Lalehabad District of Babol County, Mazandaran province, Iran. It is administered from the city of Zargar. (Note: Formerly Zagarmahalleh)

== Demographics ==
=== Population ===
At the time of the 2006 National Census, the rural district's population was 31,761 in 8,094 households. There were 31,971 inhabitants in 9,506 households at the following census of 2011. The 2016 census measured the population of the rural district as 27,828 in 9,206 households. The most populous of its 51 villages was Aminabad, with 1,952 people.

=== Other villages in the rural district ===
- Andi Kola
- Archi
- Asb-e Shur Pey
- Bala Karu Kola
- Barsemnan
- Basra-ye Bala
- Basra-ye Pain
- Biji Kola
- Chamazin
- Darzi Kola-ye Bozorg
- Darzi Kola-ye Karim Kola
- Dehak
- Hajji Kola
- Halal Kola
- Kamangar
- Khardun Kola
- Marzbal
- Miandasteh
- Navai Kola
- Pain Karu Kola
- Pija Kola
- Qadi Kola
- Shareh
- Shariat Kola
- Taligaran
