= Lalehabad District =

District in Mazandaran province, Iran

Lalehabad District Persian: بخش لاله‌آباد
- District
- Location within Iran
- Coordinates: 36°31′N 52°34′E
- Country: Iran
- Province: Mazandaran
- County: Babol
- Established: 1997
- Capital: Zargar

Population (2016)
  - Total: 49,142
- Time zone: UTC+3:30 (IRST)

Lalehabad District (Persian: بخش لاله‌آباد) is in Babol County, Mazandaran province, Iran. Its capital is the city of Zargar. (Note: Formerly Zagarmahalleh)

== Demographics ==
=== Population ===
At the time of the 2006 National Census, the district's population was 49,383 in 12,737 households. The following census in 2011 counted 50,184 people in 15,063 households. The 2016 census measured the population of the district as 49,142 inhabitants in 16,262 households.

Lalehabad District Population
Administrative Divisions	2006	2011	2016
Karipey RD	31,761	31,971	27,828
Lalehabad RD	17,197	17,790	17,323
Zargar (city)	425	423	3,991
Total	49,383	50,184	49,142
RD = Rural District
