= Central District (Babol County) =

District in Mazandaran province, Iran

Central District (Babol County) Persian: بخش مرکزی شهرستان بابل
- District
- Location within Iran
- Coordinates: 36°31′N 52°43′E
- Country: Iran
- Province: Mazandaran
- County: Babol
- Capital: Babol

Population (2016)
  - Total: 349,098
- Time zone: UTC+3:30 (IRST)

The Central District of Babol County (Persian: بخش مرکزی شهرستان بابل) is in Mazandaran province, Iran. Its capital is the city of Babol.

== Demographics ==
=== Population ===
At the time of the 2006 National Census, the district's population was 287,006 in 79,368 households. The following census in 2011 counted 314,794 people in 95,280 households. The 2016 census measured the population of the district as 349,098 inhabitants in 113,687 households.

=== Administrative divisions ===
Central District (Babol County) Population
Administrative Divisions	2006	2011	2016
Esbu Kola RD	16,319	18,310	18,709
Feyziyeh RD	24,073	25,451	26,670
Ganj Afruz RD	22,792	23,480	23,024
Amirkola (city)	25,186	28,086	30,478
Babol (city)	198,636	219,467	250,217
Total	287,006	314,794	349,098
RD = Rural District
