= Babol County =

County in Mazandaran province, Iran

Babol County Persian: شهرستان بابل
- County
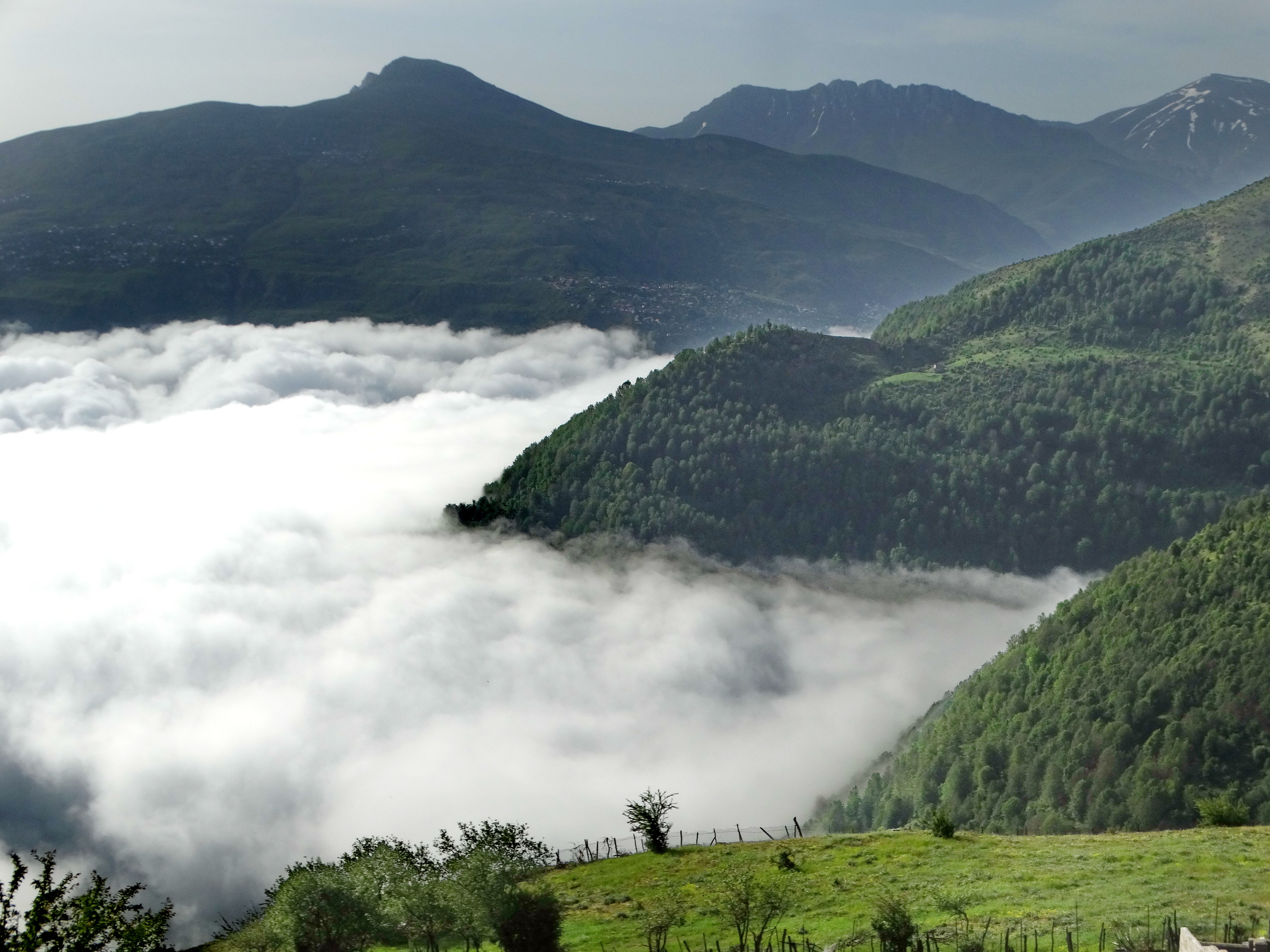
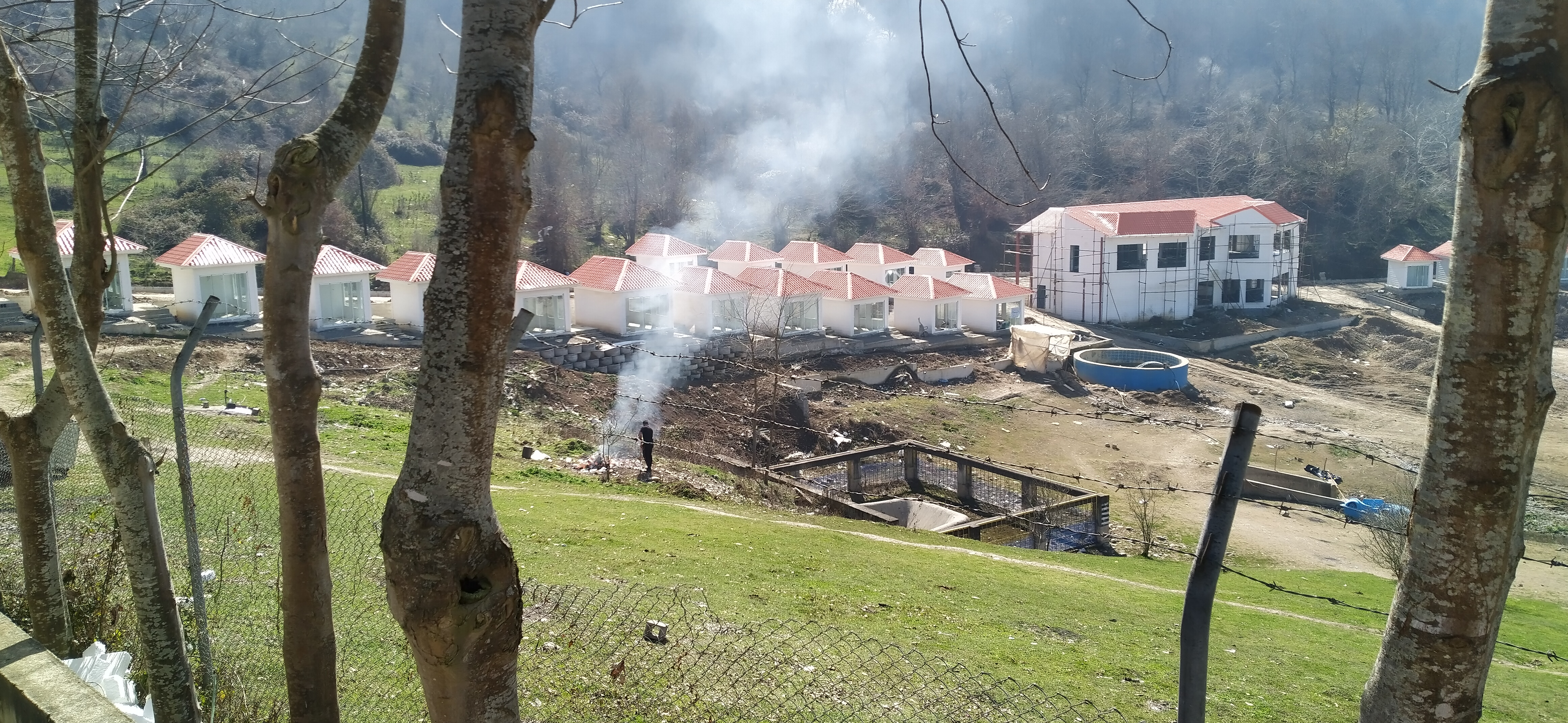
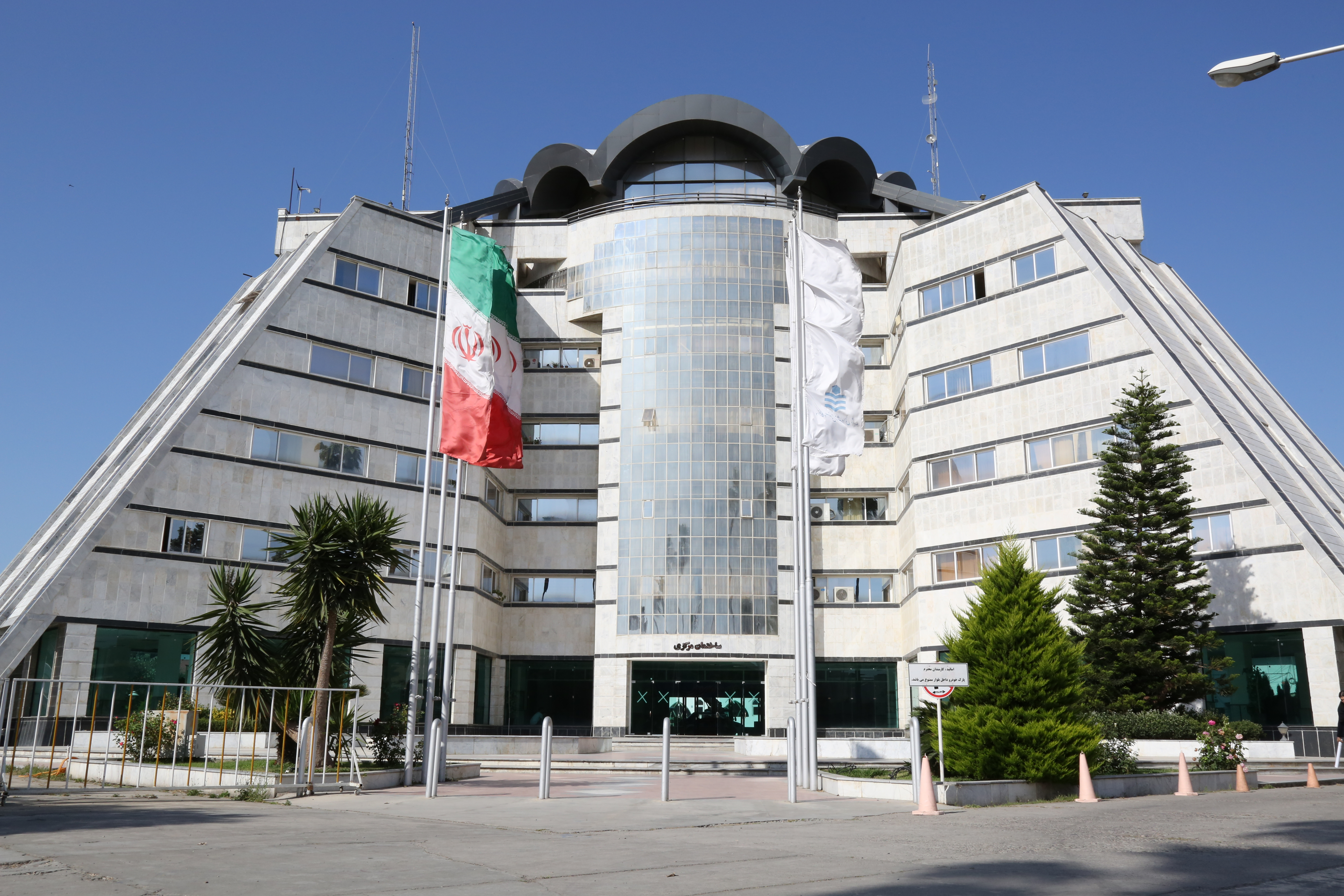
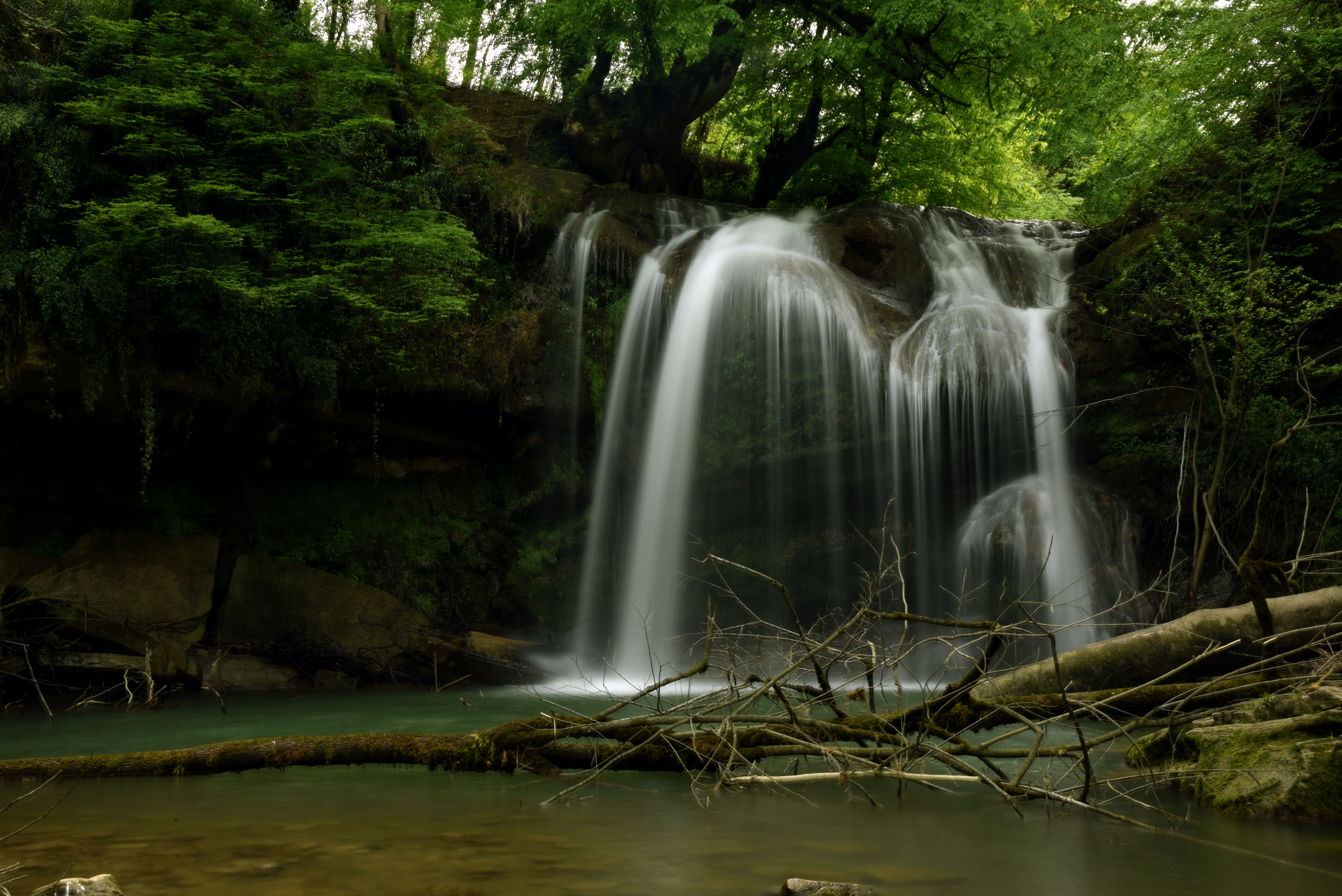
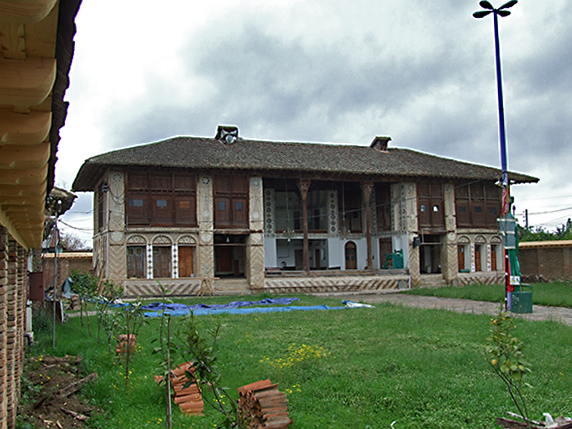
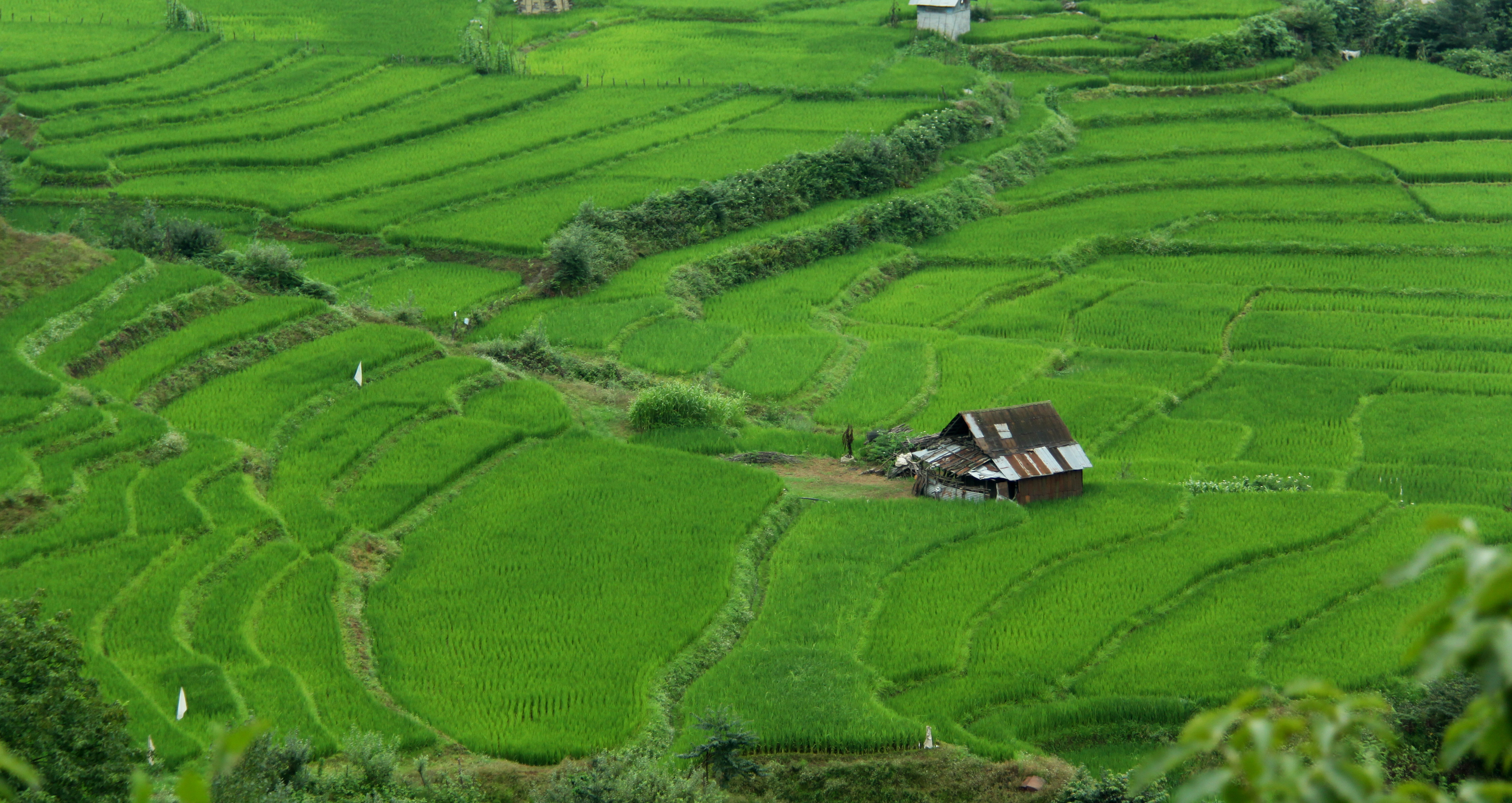

- Location of Babol County in Mazandaran province (center, purple)

- Location of Mazandaran province in Iran
- Coordinates: 36°16′N 52°36′E
- Country: Iran
- Province: Mazandaran
- Capital: Babol
- Districts: Central, Babol Kenar, Bandpey-e Gharbi, Bandpey-e Sharqi, Gatab, Lalehabad

Area
  - Total: 1,578.10 km^{2} (609.31 sq mi)

Population (2016)
  - Total: 531,930
  - Density: 337.07/km^{2} (873.01/sq mi)
- Time zone: UTC+3:30 (IRST)

Babol County (Persian: شهرستان بابل) is the most populous county in Mazandaran province and the second most populous county in northern Iran. The capital of the county is the city of Babol. Babol County consists of six districts, seven cities, and nearly 700 villages.

The elevation of the city of Babol is 2 meters below sea level, making it the "lowest" city in Mazandaran province. The elevation in the county, from the north to 10 kilometers south, is below sea level. The city of Babol is divided into two urban areas. The population of Babol in 2016 was 250,217, and that of Babol County 531,930.

== History ==
Babol County was called Barforush in the 19th century.

== Demographics ==
=== Population ===
At the time of the 2006 National Census, the county's population was 464,538 in 125,187 households. The next census in 2011 counted 495,472 people in 149,320 households. The 2016 census measured the population of the county as 531,930 in 174,351 households.

=== Administrative divisions ===
Babol County's population history and administrative structure over three consecutive censuses are shown in the following table.

Babol County Population
Administrative Divisions	2006	2011	2016
Central District	287,006	314,794	349,098
Esbu Kola RD	16,319	18,310	18,709
Feyziyeh RD	24,073	25,451	26,670
Ganj Afruz RD	22,792	23,480	23,024
Amirkola (city)	25,186	28,086	30,478
Babol (city)	198,636	219,467	250,217
Babol Kenar District	24,946	25,069	25,170
Babol Kenar RD	16,990	16,515	15,815
Deraz Kola RD	7,431	7,999	8,487
Marzikola (city)	525	555	868
Bandpey-e Gharbi District	25,577	25,876	26,233
Khvosh Rud RD	11,758	11,878	11,309
Shahidabad RD	10,879	10,681	9,182
Khush Rudpey (city)	2,940	3,317	5,742
Bandpey-e Sharqi District	32,522	33,508	35,232
Firuzjah RD	3,201	3,019	2,600
Sajjadrud RD	26,809	27,846	25,724
Galugah (city)	2,512	2,643	6,908
Gatab District	45,104	46,041	47,054
Gatab-e Jonubi RD	14,743	14,955	15,030
Gatab-e Shomali RD (Note: Formerly Gatab Rural District)	23,405	23,844	24,650
Gatab (city)	6,956	7,242	7,374
Lalehabad District	49,383	50,184	49,142
Karipey RD	31,761	31,971	27,828
Lalehabad RD	17,197	17,790	17,323
Zargar (city) (Note: Formerly Zargarmahalleh)	425	423	3,991
Total	464,538	495,472	531,930
RD = Rural District

== See also ==
Media related to Babol County at Wikimedia Commons
