= Shamsabad =

Shamsabad or Shemsabad may refer to:

== Azerbaijan ==
- Şəmsabad

== India ==
- Shamsabad, Agra
- Shamsabad, Farrukhabad
- Shamshabad, town in Telangana, India near Hyderabad
  - Shamshabad Rajiv Gandhi International Airport, serving Hyderabad, India
- Shamshabad, Madhya Pradesh
  - Shamshabad (Vidhan Sabha constituency), of the Madhya Pradesh Legislative Assembly

== Iran ==
=== Ardabil Province ===
- Shamsabad, Khalkhal, a village in Khalkhal County
- Shamsabad, Meshgin Shahr, a village in Meshgin Shahr County
- Shamsabad, Nir, a village in Nir County
- Shamsabad, Sareyn, a village in Sareyn County

=== Chaharmahal and Bakhtiari Province ===
- Shamsabad, Chaharmahal and Bakhtiari, a village in Shahrekord County

=== Fars Province ===
- Shamsabad, Bakhtajerd, a village in Darab County
- Shamsabad, Paskhan, a village in Darab County
- Shamsabad, Estahban, a village in Estahban County
- Shamsabad-e Borzu, a village in Marvdasht County
- Shamsabad-e Chahar Taq, a village in Marvdasht County
- Shamsabad-e Takht, a village in Marvdasht County
- Shamsabad, Sepidan, a village in Sepidan County
- Shamsabad-e Qareh Gozlu, a village in Sepidan County

=== Golestan Province ===
- Shamsabad, Golestan, a village in Gorgan County, Golestan Province

=== Hamadan Province ===
- Shamsabad, Hamadan, a village in Hamadan County, Hamadan Province

=== Isfahan Province ===
- Shamsabad, Ardestan, a village in Ardestan County
- Shamsabad, Isfahan, a village in Isfahan County

=== Kerman Province ===
- Shamsabad, Anbarabad, a village in Anbarabad County
- Shamsabad, Arzuiyeh, a village in Arzuiyeh County
- Shamsabad-e Olya, a village in Bam County
- Shamsabad-e Chahdegal, a village in Fahraj County
- Shamsabad, Kerman, a village in Kerman County
- Shamsabad, Qaleh Ganj, a village in Qaleh Ganj County
- Shamsabad, Sorkh Qaleh, a village in Qaleh Ganj County
- Shamsabad, Rafsanjan, a village in Rafsanjan County
- Shamsabad, Sirjan, a village in Sirjan County

=== Kermanshah Province ===
- Shamsabad, Kermanshah, a village in Harsin County

=== Khuzestan Province ===
- Shamsabad, Bagh-e Malek, a village in Bagh-e Malek County
- Shamsabad, Dezful, a village in Dezful County
- Shamsabad Rural District (Khuzestan Province)
- Shamsabad, Golgir, a village in Masjed Soleyman County

=== Kohgiluyeh and Boyer-Ahmad Province ===
- Shamsabad, Kohgiluyeh and Boyer-Ahmad, a village in Charam County

=== Lorestan Province ===
- Shamsabad, Lorestan

=== Markazi Province ===
- Shamsabad, Amiriyeh, a village in Arak County
- Shamsabad, Davudabad, a village in Arak County
- Shamsabad, Shamsabad, a village in Arak County
- Shamsabad, Khomeyn, a village in Khomeyn County
- Shamsabad Rural District (Markazi Province)

=== Mazandaran Province ===
- Shamsabad, Amol, a village in Amol County
- Shamsabad, Tonekabon, a village in Tonekabon County

=== Qom Province ===
- Shamsabad, Qom

=== Razavi Khorasan Province ===
- Shamsabad, Bardaskan, a village in Bardaskan County
- Shamsabad (36°11′ N 58°38′ E), Firuzeh, a village in Firuzeh County
- Shamsabad, Jowayin, a village in Jowayin County
- Shamsabad, Khoshab, a village in Khoshab County
- Shamsabad, Mahvelat, a village in Mahvelat County
- Shamsabad, Mashhad, a village in Mashhad County
- Shamsabad, Mazul, a village in Nishapur County
- Shamsabad, Rivand, a village in Nishapur County
- Shamsabad, Sabzevar, a village in Sabzevar County

=== Sistan and Baluchestan Province ===
- Shamsabad, Bampur, a village in Bampur County
- Shamsabad, Dalgan, a village in Dalgan County
- Shamsabad-e Sarhang, a village in Iranshahr County

=== South Khorasan Province ===
- Shamsabad, Birjand, a village in Birjand County
- Shamsabad, Darmian, a village in Darmian County
- Shamsabad, Khusf, a village in Khusf County
- Shamsabad, Tabas, a village in Tabas County

=== Tehran Province ===
- Shamsabad, Tehran
- Shamsabad, Eslamshahr, a village in Eslamshahr County
- Shamsabad, Fashapuyeh, a village in Rey County
- Shamsabad, Kahrizak, a village in Rey County
- Shamsabad, Varamin, a village in Varamin County
- Shamsabad-e Arab, a village in Varamin County

=== Yazd Province ===
- Shamsabad, Abarkuh, a village in Abarkuh County
- Shamsabad, Ardakan, a village in Ardakan County
- Shamsabad, Saduq, a village in Saduq County
- Shamsabad (31°43′ N 53°39′ E), Taft, a village in Taft County
- Shamsabad (31°49′ N 53°45′ E), Taft, a village in Taft County

== Pakistan ==
- Shamsabad, Pakistan, near Attock

== See also ==
- Shamshabad, Iran (disambiguation)
