= Borjak =

Borjak (Persian: برجك) may refer to:

- Barjak, Hamadan
- Barjak, Kerman
- Borjak-e Hasan, Kerman Province
- Borjak-e Seyfollah, Kerman Province
- Borjak, Markazi
- Borjak, Bardaskan, Razavi Khorasan Province
- Borjak-e Naqdali, Razavi Khorasan Province
- Borjak-e Sheykhi, Razavi Khorasan Province
- Borjak, alternate name of Bijvard, Razavi Khorasan Province

== See also ==
- Borjaki, Hamadan Province, Iran
- Barjak (disambiguation)
