= Gelu =

Gelu may refer to:

== People ==
- Gelou, 10th-century leader of the Vlachs and Slavs in Transylvania
- Gelu Barbu (1932–2016), Romanian-born Spanish ballet dancer and choreographer
- Gelu Lisac (born 1967), Romanian water polo player
- Gelu Radu (born 1957), Romanian weightlifter
- Gelu Velici (born 1992), Romanian footballer
- Gelu Vlașin (born 1966), Romanian poet
- Gelu Voican Voiculescu (born 1941), Romanian politician
- Jacques Gélu (fl. 1427–1432), Archbishop of Embrun
- Lakpa Gelu (born 1967), Nepalese Sherpa climber

== Places ==
=== Iran ===
- Gelu, Qaleh Ganj, a village in Kerman Province
- Gelu, Rudbar-e Jonubi, a village in Kerman Province

=== Nepal ===
- Gelu, Nepal

=== Romania ===
- Gelu, Satu Mare
- Gelu, a village in Terebești Commune, Satu Mare County
- Gelu, a village in Variaș Commune, Timiș County

== Other uses ==
- Karluks, a Turkic tribal confederacy
- Gelu, a fictional character introduced in Heroes of Might and Magic III: Armageddon's Blade
- GELU (Gaussian error linear unit), a type of activation function used in artificial neural networks
