= Shamzan =

Shamzan (Persian: شمزان) may refer to:

- Shamzan-e Chah Bagh
- Shamzan-e Hiyet
- Shamzan-e Jehadiyeh
