= Barjak =

Barjak may refer to:

- Barjak, Hamadan, a village in Iran
- Barjak, Kerman, a village in Iran
- Bajrak, also known as Barjak, an Ottoman territorial unit type
- Bajraku, also known as Oštro koplje, a mountain peak in Kosovo
- Borjak-e Seyfollah, also known as Barjak, a village in Kerman Province, Iran

== See also ==
- Borjak (disambiguation)
- Barjok (disambiguation)
