= Sorkh Qaleh =

Sorkh Qaleh (Persian: سرخ قلعه) may refer to:

- Sorkh Qaleh, Kerman
- Sorkh Qaleh, North Khorasan
- Sorkh Qaleh-ye Kordha, North Khorasan Province
- Sorkh Qaleh Rural District, in Kerman Province
