= Shamshabad, Iran =

Shamshabad (Persian: شمش اباد) in Iran may refer to:

- Shamshabad, Chaharmahal and Bakhtiari
- Shamshabad, Kerman

== See also ==
- Shamsabad (disambiguation)
- Shamshabad, town in Telangana, India near Hyderabad
  - Shamshabad Rajiv Gandhi International Airport, serving Hyderabad, India
- Shamshabad, Madhya Pradesh
  - Shamshabad (Vidhan Sabha constituency), of the Madhya Pradesh Legislative Assembly
