= Qaleh Sar, Tonekabon =

Qaleh Sar قلعه سر
- Village
- Interactive map of Qaleh Sar
- Coordinates: 36°44′18.8″N 50°59′52″E
- Country: Iran
- Province: Mazandaran
- County: Tonekabon
- Bakhsh: Nashta
- Rural District: Tameshkol

Population (2016)
  - Total: 170
- Time zone: UTC+3:30 (IRST)

Qaleh Sar (Persian: قلعه سر, also Romanized as Qal‘eh Sar) is a village in Tameshkol Rural District, Nashta District, Tonekabon County, Mazandaran Province, Iran. At the 2006 census, its population was 179, in 44 families. In 2016, its population was 170, in 59 households.

Qaleh Sar is a suburb of Nashtarud city, and is located south of Maka Rud village.
