= Chakadeh =

Chakadeh چكاده
- Village
- Location within Iran
- Coordinates: 36°43′56″N 51°00′01″E
- Country: Iran
- Province: Mazandaran
- County: Tonekabon
- Bakhsh: Nashta
- Rural District: Tameshkol

Population (2006)
  - Total: 47
- Time zone: UTC+3:30 (IRST)
  - Summer (DST): UTC+4:30 (IRDT)

Chakadeh (Persian: چكاده, also Romanized as Chakādeh) is a village in Tameshkol Rural District, Nashta District, Tonekabon County, Mazandaran Province, Iran. At the 2006 census, its population was 47, in 15 families.
