= Tombat =

Tombat (Persian: تم بت) may refer to:

- Tombat-e Bala
- Tombat-e Pain
