= Chehel Mani, Qaleh Ganj =

Village in Kerman province, Iran

Chehel Mani Persian: چهل مني
- Village
- Location within Iran
- Coordinates: 27°42′29″N 58°02′43″E
- Country: Iran
- Province: Kerman
- County: Qaleh Ganj
- District: Sorkh Qaleh
- Rural District: Chehel Mani

Population (2016)
  - Total: 1,162
- Time zone: UTC+3:30 (IRST)

Chehel Mani (Persian: چهل مني (Note: Also romanized as Chehel Manī) is a village in, and the capital of, Chehel Mani Rural District of Sorkh Qaleh District, Qaleh Ganj County, Kerman province, Iran.

== Demographics ==
=== Population ===
At the time of the 2006 National Census, the village's population was 1,298 in 270 households, when it was in Sorkh Qaleh Rural District of the Central District. The following census in 2011 counted 1,351 people in 353 households. The 2016 census measured the population of the village as 1,162 people in 313 households.

After the census, the rural district was separated from the district in the formation of Sorkh Qaleh District. Chehel Mani was transferred to Chehel Mani Rural District created in the new district.
