= Tarikmah =

Tarikmah تاريك ماه
- Village
- Location within Iran
- Coordinates: 27°37′59″N 57°55′42″E
- Country: Iran
- Province: Kerman
- County: Qaleh Ganj
- Bakhsh: Central
- Rural District: Qaleh Ganj

Population (2006)
  - Total: 742
- Time zone: UTC+3:30 (IRST)
  - Summer (DST): UTC+4:30 (IRDT)

Tarikmah (Persian: تاريك ماه, also Romanized as Tārīkmāh) is a village in Qaleh Ganj Rural District, in the Central District of Qaleh Ganj County, Kerman Province, Iran. At the 2006 census, its population was 742, in 151 families.
