= Tomgaran =

Tomgaran تم گران
- Village
- Location within Iran
- Coordinates: 27°20′51″N 58°03′29″E
- Country: Iran
- Province: Kerman
- County: Qaleh Ganj
- Bakhsh: Central
- Rural District: Qaleh Ganj

Population (2006)
  - Total: 688
- Time zone: UTC+3:30 (IRST)
  - Summer (DST): UTC+4:30 (IRDT)

Tomgaran (Persian: تم گران, also Romanized as Tomgarān and Tom Garan; also known as Tamp-e Gīrān, Tūmgīrān, and Tūmpgīrān) is a village in Qaleh Ganj Rural District, in the Central District of Qaleh Ganj County, Kerman Province, Iran. At the 2006 census, its population was 688, in 151 families.
