= Keshit =

Keshit or Kashit (Persian: كشيت) may refer to:

- Keshit, Anbarabad
- Kashit, Jiroft
- Keshit, Kerman
- Keshit, Qaleh Ganj
- Keshit Rural District, in Kerman County
