= Shahid Reza Chah Nasiri =

Shahid Reza Chah Nasiri شهيد رضا چاه نصيري
- Village
- Interactive map of Shahid Reza Chah Nasiri
- Country: Iran
- Province: Kerman
- County: Qaleh Ganj
- Bakhsh: Central
- Rural District: Qaleh Ganj

Population (2006)
  - Total: 125
- Time zone: UTC+3:30 (IRST)
  - Summer (DST): UTC+4:30 (IRDT)

Shahid Reza Chah Nasiri (Persian: شهيد رضا چاه نصيري, also Romanized as Shahīd Rez̤ā Chāh Naṣīrī) is a village in Qaleh Ganj Rural District, in the Central District of Qaleh Ganj County, Kerman Province, Iran. At the 2006 census, its population was 125 people in 30 families.
