= Sefid Ab, Mazandaran =

Sefid Ab سفيداب
- Village
- Location within Iran
- Coordinates: 36°40′28″N 51°01′06″E
- Country: Iran
- Province: Mazandaran
- County: Tonekabon
- Bakhsh: Nashta
- Rural District: Tameshkol

Population (2006)
  - Total: 170
- Time zone: UTC+3:30 (IRST)
  - Summer (DST): UTC+4:30 (IRDT)

Sefid Ab (Persian: سفيداب, also Romanized as Sefīd Āb) is a village in Tameshkol Rural District, Nashta District, Tonekabon County, Mazandaran Province, Iran. At the 2006 census, its population was 170, in 40 families.
