= Chehel Mani =

Chehel Mani or Chehil Mani (Persian: چهل مني) may refer to:

- Chehel Mani, Anbarabad, Kerman Province
- Chehel Mani, Qaleh Ganj, Kerman Province
- Chehel Mani, Khuzestan
- Chehel Mani, Sistan and Baluchestan
