= Pamikh =

Pamikh پاميخ
- Village
- Location within Iran
- Coordinates: 27°26′30″N 57°56′06″E
- Country: Iran
- Province: Kerman
- County: Qaleh Ganj
- Bakhsh: Central
- Rural District: Qaleh Ganj

Population (2006)
  - Total: 69
- Time zone: UTC+3:30 (IRST)
  - Summer (DST): UTC+4:30 (IRDT)

Pamikh (Persian: پاميخ, also Romanized as Pāmīkh; also known as Pā’emī and Yā’emī) is a village in Qaleh Ganj Rural District, in the Central District of Qaleh Ganj County, Kerman Province, Iran. At the 2006 census, its population was 69, in 9 families.
