= Sar Bud =

Sar Bud سربود
- Village
- Location within Iran
- Coordinates: 36°43′39″N 50°58′26″E
- Country: Iran
- Province: Mazandaran
- County: Tonekabon
- Bakhsh: Nashta
- Rural District: Katra

Population (2016)
  - Total: 170
- Time zone: UTC+3:30 (IRST)

Sar Bud (Persian: سربود, also Romanized as Sar Būd) is a village in Katra Rural District, Nashta District, Tonekabon County, Mazandaran Province, Iran.

At the time of the 2006 National Census, the village's population was 190 in 58 households. The following census in 2011 counted 184 people in 63 households. The 2016 census measured the population of the village as 170 people in 58 households.
