= Babulat =

Babulat بابولات
- Village
- Location within Iran
- Coordinates: 36°45′11″N 50°57′42″E
- Country: Iran
- Province: Mazandaran
- County: Tonekabon
- Bakhsh: Nashta
- Rural District: Katra

Population (2016)
  - Total: 266
- Time zone: UTC+3:30 (IRST)

Babulat (Persian: بابولات, also Romanized as Bābūlāt) is a village in Katra Rural District, Nashta District, Tonekabon County, Mazandaran Province, Iran.

At the time of the 2006 National Census, the village's population was 219 in 56 households. The following census in 2011 counted 230 people in 73 households. The 2016 census measured the population of the village as 266 people in 91 households.
