= Shahrak-e Sahab ol Zeman =

Shahrak-e Sahab ol Zeman شهرك صاحب الزمان
- Village
- Interactive map of Shahrak-e Sahab ol Zeman
- Country: Iran
- Province: Kerman
- County: Qaleh Ganj
- Bakhsh: Central
- Rural District: Sorkh Qaleh

Population (2006)
  - Total: 219
- Time zone: UTC+3:30 (IRST)
  - Summer (DST): UTC+4:30 (IRDT)

Shahrak-e Sahab ol Zeman (Persian: شهرك صاحب الزمان, also Romanized as Shahrak-e Şāḥab ol Zemān) is a village in Sorkh Qaleh Rural District, in the Central District of Qaleh Ganj County, Kerman Province, Iran. At the 2006 census, its population was 219, in 51 families.
