= Rigmatin =

Rigmatin ريگ متين
- Village
- Location within Iran
- Coordinates: 27°38′27″N 58°07′37″E
- Country: Iran
- Province: Kerman
- County: Qaleh Ganj
- Bakhsh: Central
- Rural District: Sorkh Qaleh

Population (2006)
  - Total: 578
- Time zone: UTC+3:30 (IRST)
  - Summer (DST): UTC+4:30 (IRDT)

Rigmatin (Persian: ريگ متين, also Romanized as Rīgmatīn) is a village in Sorkh Qaleh Rural District, in the Central District of Qaleh Ganj County, Kerman Province, Iran. At the 2006 census, its population was 578, in 155 families.
