= Tomesorkh =

Tomesorkh تم سرخ
- Village
- Location within Iran
- Coordinates: 27°44′00″N 58°00′23″E
- Country: Iran
- Province: Kerman
- County: Qaleh Ganj
- Bakhsh: Central
- Rural District: Sorkh Qaleh

Population (2006)
  - Total: 151
- Time zone: UTC+3:30 (IRST)
  - Summer (DST): UTC+4:30 (IRDT)

Tomesorkh (Persian: تم سرخ) is a village in Sorkh Qaleh Rural District, in the Central District of Qaleh Ganj County, Kerman Province, Iran. At the 2006 census, its population was 151, in 33 families.
