= Dasht-e Ganjabad Ashayir Alidadi =

Dasht-e Ganjabad Ashayir Alidadi دشت گنج اباد عشاير عليدادي
- Village
- Country: Iran
- Province: Kerman
- County: Qaleh Ganj
- Bakhsh: Central
- Rural District: Sorkh Qaleh

Population (2006)
  - Total: 50
- Time zone: UTC+3:30 (IRST)
  - Summer (DST): UTC+4:30 (IRDT)

Dasht-e Ganjabad Ashayir Alidadi (Persian: دشت گنج اباد عشاير عليدادي, also Romanized as Dasht-e Ganjābād ʿAshāīyr ʿAlīdādī) is a village in Sorkh Qaleh Rural District, in the Central District of Qaleh Ganj County, Kerman Province, Iran. At the 2006 census, its population was 50, in 10 families.
