= Pishizan =

Pishizan پيشيزان
- Village
- Interactive map of Pishizan
- Country: Iran
- Province: Kerman
- County: Qaleh Ganj
- Bakhsh: Central
- Rural District: Qaleh Ganj

Population (2006)
  - Total: 48
- Time zone: UTC+3:30 (IRST)
  - Summer (DST): UTC+4:30 (IRDT)

Pishizan (Persian: پيشيزان, also Romanized as Pīshīzān) is a village in Qaleh Ganj Rural District, in the Central District of Qaleh Ganj County, Kerman Province, Iran. At the 2006 census, its population was 48, in 11 families.
