= Homrud Bon =

Homrud Bon همرودبن
- Village
- Interactive map of Homrud Bon
- Coordinates: 36.709°N 50.966°E
- Country: Iran
- Province: Mazandaran
- County: Tonekabon
- Bakhsh: Nashta
- Rural District: Katra

Population (2016)
  - Total: 50
- Time zone: UTC+3:30 (IRST)

Homrud Bon (Persian: همرودبن, also Romanized as Homrūd Bon) is a village in Katra Rural District, Nashta District, Tonekabon County, Mazandaran Province, Iran. At the 2006 census, its population was 70, in 26 families.

At the time of the 2006 National Census, the village's population was 70 in 26 households. The following census in 2011 counted 57 people in 22 households. The 2016 census measured the population of the village as 50 people in 21 households.
