= Chehel Mani Rural District =

Rural district in Kerman province, Iran

Chehel Mani Rural District Persian: دهستان چهل منی
- Rural District
- Location within Iran
- Coordinates: 27°47′29″N 57°56′33″E
- Country: Iran
- Province: Kerman
- County: Qaleh Ganj
- District: Sorkh Qaleh
- Capital: Chehel Mani
- Time zone: UTC+3:30 (IRST)

Chehel Mani Rural District (Persian: دهستان چهل منی) is in Sorkh Qaleh District of Qaleh Ganj County, Kerman province, Iran. Its capital is the village of Chehel Mani, whose population at the time of the 2016 National Census was 1,162 people in 313 households.

== History ==
After the 2016 census, Sorkh Qaleh Rural District was separated from the Central District in the formation of Sorkh Qaleh District, and Chehel Mani Rural District was created in the new district.
