= Rustai-ye Kermat =

Rustai-ye Kermat روستائ كرمت
- Village
- Interactive map of Rustai-ye Kermat
- Country: Iran
- Province: Kerman
- County: Qaleh Ganj
- Bakhsh: Central
- Rural District: Sorkh Qaleh

Population (2006)
  - Total: 302
- Time zone: UTC+3:30 (IRST)
  - Summer (DST): UTC+4:30 (IRDT)

Rustai-ye Kermat (Persian: روستائ كرمت, also Romanized as Rūstāi-ye Kermat) is a village in Sorkh Qaleh Rural District, in the Central District of Qaleh Ganj County, Kerman Province, Iran. At the 2006 census, its population was 302, in 62 families.
