= Jamshahi =

Jamshahi جم شاهي
- Village
- Location within Iran
- Coordinates: 27°29′45″N 57°55′56″E
- Country: Iran
- Province: Kerman
- County: Qaleh Ganj
- Bakhsh: Central
- Rural District: Qaleh Ganj

Population (2006)
  - Total: 285
- Time zone: UTC+3:30 (IRST)
  - Summer (DST): UTC+4:30 (IRDT)

Jamshahi (Persian: جم شاهي, also Romanized as Jamshāhī) is a village in Qaleh Ganj Rural District, in the Central District of Qaleh Ganj County, Kerman Province, Iran. At the 2006 census, its population was 285, in 67 families.
