= Kamiliyeh =

Komeyliyeh كميليه
- Village
- Interactive map of Komeyliyeh
- Coordinates: 36.722°N 50.965°E
- Country: Iran
- Province: Mazandaran
- County: Tonekabon
- Bakhsh: Nashta
- Rural District: Katra

Population (2006)
  - Total: 266
- Time zone: UTC+3:30 (IRST)

Komeyliyeh (Persian: كميليه, also Romanized as Kamīlīyeh), also known by its former name as Shabkhus Meidan, is a village in Katra Rural District, Nashta District, Tonekabon County, Mazandaran Province, Iran.

At the time of the 2006 National Census, the village's population was 315 in 90 households. The following census in 2011 counted 294 people in 96 households. The 2016 census measured the population of the village as 266 people in 99 households.
