= Shahrak-e Saduqi =

Shahrak-e Saduqi شهرك صدوقي
- village
- Interactive map of Shahrak-e Saduqi
- Coordinates: 36.2717°N 59.6601°E
- Country: Iran
- Province: Kerman
- County: Qaleh Ganj
- Bakhsh: Central
- Rural District: Sorkh Qaleh

Population (2006)
  - Total: 312
- Time zone: UTC+3:30 (IRST)
  - Summer (DST): UTC+4:30 (IRDT)

Shahrak-e Saduqi (Persian: شهرك صدوقي, also Romanized as Shahrak-e Şadūqī) is a village in Sorkh Qaleh Rural District, in the Central District of Qaleh Ganj County, Kerman Province, Iran. At the 2006 census, its population was 312, in 69 families.
