= Mianju Ahmadabad =

Mianju Ahmadabad ميان جواحمداباد
- Village
- Interactive map of Mianju Ahmadabad
- Country: Iran
- Province: Kerman
- County: Qaleh Ganj
- Bakhsh: Central
- Rural District: Sorkh Qaleh

Population (2006)
  - Total: 211
- Time zone: UTC+3:30 (IRST)
  - Summer (DST): UTC+4:30 (IRDT)

Mianju Ahmadabad (Persian: ميان جواحمداباد, also Romanized as Mīānjū Aḩmadābād) is a village in Sorkh Qaleh Rural District, in the Central District of Qaleh Ganj County, Kerman Province, Iran. At the 2006 census, its population was 211, in 38 families.
