= Rigsalimi =

Rigsalimi ريگ سليمي
- Village
- Location within Iran
- Coordinates: 27°46′17″N 57°58′25″E
- Country: Iran
- Province: Kerman
- County: Qaleh Ganj
- Bakhsh: Central
- Rural District: Sorkh Qaleh

Population (2006)
  - Total: 597
- Time zone: UTC+3:30 (IRST)
  - Summer (DST): UTC+4:30 (IRDT)

Rigsalimi (Persian: ريگ سليمي, also Romanized as Rīgsalīmī; also known as Rīgsalmī) is a village in Sorkh Qaleh Rural District, in the Central District of Qaleh Ganj County, Kerman Province, Iran. According to the 2006 census, the villages population was 597, in 108 families.
