= Bani Taratom =

Bani Taratom بني تراتم
- Village
- Location within Iran
- Coordinates: 27°34′08″N 57°54′53″E
- Country: Iran
- Province: Kerman
- County: Qaleh Ganj
- Bakhsh: Central
- Rural District: Qaleh Ganj

Population (2006)
  - Total: 263
- Time zone: UTC+3:30 (IRST)
  - Summer (DST): UTC+4:30 (IRDT)

Bani Taratom (Persian: بني تراتم, also romanized as Banī Tarātom and Banī Terātom; also known as Banūtarātom) is a village in Qaleh Ganj Rural District, in the Central District of Qaleh Ganj County, Kerman Province, Iran. At the 2006 census, its population was 263, in 50 families.
