= Shumehri =

Shumehri شومهري
- Village
- Location within Iran
- Coordinates: 27°46′47″N 57°52′47″E
- Country: Iran
- Province: Kerman
- County: Qaleh Ganj
- Bakhsh: Central
- Rural District: Sorkh Qaleh

Population (2006)
  - Total: 585
- Time zone: UTC+3:30 (IRST)
  - Summer (DST): UTC+4:30 (IRDT)

Shumehri (Persian: شومهري, also romanized as Shūmehrī; also known as Shūmedrī) is a village in Sorkh Qaleh Rural District, in the Central District of Qaleh Ganj County, Kerman Province, Iran. At the 2006 census its population was 585, in 104 families.
