= Bond-e Bari =

Bond-e Bari (Persian: بندبري) may refer to:

- Bond-e Bari (1)
- Bond-e Bari (2)
