= Kuti Bazar =

Kuti Bazar كوتي بازار
- Village
- Country: Iran
- Province: Mazandaran
- County: Tonekabon
- Bakhsh: Nashta
- Rural District: Tameshkol

Population (2006)
  - Total: 56
- Time zone: UTC+3:30 (IRST)
  - Summer (DST): UTC+4:30 (IRDT)

Kuti Bazar (Persian: كوتي بازار, also Romanized as Kūtī Bāzār) is a village in Tameshkol Rural District, Nashta District, Tonekabon County, Mazandaran Province, Iran. At the 2006 census, its population was 56, in 13 families.
