= Ahuan =

Ahuan (Persian: اهوان) may refer to:

- Ahuan-e Bala
- Ahuan-e Vasat
