= Luleh Deh =

Luleh Deh لوله ده
- Village
- Location within Iran
- Coordinates: 36°44′21″N 51°00′35″E
- Country: Iran
- Province: Mazandaran
- County: Tonekabon
- Bakhsh: Nashta
- Rural District: Tameshkol

Population (2016)
  - Total: 465
- Time zone: UTC+3:30 (IRST)

Luleh Deh (Persian: لوله ده, also Romanized as Lūleh Deh) is a village in Tameshkol Rural District, Nashta District, Tonekabon County, Mazandaran Province, Iran. In the 2006 census, its population is 418, in 114 families.

At the time of the 2006 National Census, the village's population was 418 in 114 households. The following census in 2011 counted 438 people in 138 households. The 2016 census measured 465 people in 165 households.
