= Lat Siah Moshteh =

Lat Siah Moshteh لات سياه مشته
- Village
- Location within Iran
- Coordinates: 36°40′26″N 50°59′24″E
- Country: Iran
- Province: Mazandaran
- County: Tonekabon
- Bakhsh: Nashta
- Rural District: Katra

Population (2016)
  - Total: 72
- Time zone: UTC+3:30 (IRST)

Lat Siah Moshteh (Persian: لات سياه مشته, also Romanized as Lāt Sīāh Moshteh; also known as Lāt Sīā Moshteh) is a village in Katra Rural District, Nashta District, Tonekabon County, Mazandaran Province, Iran.

At the time of the 2006 National Census, the village's population was 55 in 15 households. The following census in 2011 counted 80 people in 28 households. The 2016 census measured 72 people in 26 households.
