= Keshit, Qaleh Ganj =

Keshit كشيت
- Village
- Location within Iran
- Coordinates: 27°25′40″N 57°48′12″E
- Country: Iran
- Province: Kerman
- County: Qaleh Ganj
- Bakhsh: Central
- Rural District: Qaleh Ganj

Population (2006)
  - Total: 173
- Time zone: UTC+3:30 (IRST)
  - Summer (DST): UTC+4:30 (IRDT)

Keshit (Persian: كشيت, also Romanized as Keshīt; also known as Geshīt) is a village in Qaleh Ganj Rural District, in the Central District of Qaleh Ganj County, Kerman Province, Iran. At the 2006 census, its population was 173, in 40 families.
