= Dulab, Qaleh Ganj =

Village in Kerman province, Iran

Dulab Persian: دولاب
- Village
- Location within Iran
- Coordinates: 27°37′08″N 57°55′05″E
- Country: Iran
- Province: Kerman
- County: Qaleh Ganj
- District: Central
- Rural District: Dulab

Population (2016)
  - Total: 1,253
- Time zone: UTC+3:30 (IRST)

Dulab (Persian: دولاب) (Note: Also romanized as Dūlāb) is a village in, and the capital of, Dulab Rural District of the Central District of Qaleh Ganj County, Kerman province, Iran.

== Demographics ==
=== Population ===
At the time of the 2006 National Census, the village's population was 1,808 in 377 households, when it was in Qaleh Ganj Rural District. The following census in 2011 counted 2,093 people in 532 households. The 2016 census measured the population of the village as 1,253 people in 357 households. It was the most populous village in its rural district.

After the census, Dulab was transferred to Dulab Rural District created in the district.
