= Alkaleh =

Village in Mazandaran province, Iran

Alkaleh Persian: الكله
- Village
- Location within Iran
- Coordinates: 36°46′02″N 50°58′05″E
- Country: Iran
- Province: Mazandaran
- County: Tonekabon
- District: Nashta
- Rural District: Katra

Population (2016)
  - Total: 763
- Time zone: UTC+3:30 (IRST)

Alkaleh (Persian: الكله) (Note: Also romanized as Āl Kaleh and Ālkaleh) is a village in Katra Rural District (Note: Formerly Nashtarud Rural District) of Nashta District in Tonekabon County, Mazandaran province, Iran.

== Demographics ==
=== Population ===
At the time of the 2006 National Census, the village's population was 654 in 195 households. The following census in 2011 counted 687 people in 228 households. The 2016 census measured the population of the village as 763 people in 266 households.
