= Mazubon-e Olya =

Village in Mazandaran province, Iran

Mazubon-e Olya Persian: مازوبن عليا
- Village
- Location within Iran
- Coordinates: 36°43′41″N 50°57′36″E
- Country: Iran
- Province: Mazandaran
- County: Tonekabon
- District: Nashta
- Rural District: Katra

Population (2016)
  - Total: 586
- Time zone: UTC+3:30 (IRST)

Mazubon-e Olya (Persian: مازوبن عليا) (Note: Also romanized as Māzūbon-e ‘Olyā; also known as Māzūbon) is a village in Katra Rural District (Note: Formerly Nashtarud Rural District) of Nashta District in Tonekabon County, Mazandaran province, Iran.

== Demographics ==
=== Population ===
At the time of the 2006 National Census, the village's population was 548 in 162 households. The following census in 2011 counted 572 people in 206 households. The 2016 census measured the population of the village as 586 people in 225 households.
