= Tombat-e Bala =

Tombat-e Bala تم بت بالا
- Village
- Location within Iran
- Coordinates: 27°42′17″N 58°04′07″E
- Country: Iran
- Province: Kerman
- County: Qaleh Ganj
- Bakhsh: Central
- Rural District: Sorkh Qaleh

Population (2006)
  - Total: 294
- Time zone: UTC+3:30 (IRST)
  - Summer (DST): UTC+4:30 (IRDT)

Tombat-e Bala (Persian: تم بت بالا, also Romanized as Tombat-e Bālā) is a village in Sorkh Qaleh Rural District, in the Central District of Qaleh Ganj County, Kerman Province, Iran. At the 2006 census, its population was 294, in 61 families.
