= Kazemabad, Mazandaran =

Village in Mazandaran province, Iran

Kazemabad Persian: كاظم اباد
- Village
- Location within Iran
- Coordinates: 36°44′00″N 51°01′15″E
- Country: Iran
- Province: Mazandaran
- County: Tonekabon
- District: Nashta
- Rural District: Tameshkol

Population (2016)
  - Total: 687
- Time zone: UTC+3:30 (IRST)

Kazemabad (Persian: كاظم اباد) (Note: Also romanized as Kāẓemābād) is a village in Tameshkol Rural District of Nashta District in Tonekabon County, Mazandaran province, Iran.

== Demographics ==
=== Population ===
At the time of the 2006 National Census, the village's population was 674 in 192 households. The following census in 2011 counted 640 people in 194 households. The 2016 census measured the population of the village as 687 people in 230 households.
