= Sarfaqihabad =

Village in Mazandaran province, Iran

Sarfaqihabad Persian: سرفقيه اباد
- Village
- Location within Iran
- Coordinates: 36°42′58″N 51°02′40″E
- Country: Iran
- Province: Mazandaran
- County: Tonekabon
- District: Nashta
- Rural District: Tameshkol

Population (2016)
  - Total: 537
- Time zone: UTC+3:30 (IRST)

Sarfaqihabad (Persian: سرفقيه اباد) (Note: Also romanized as Sarfaqīhābād) is a village in Tameshkol Rural District of Nashta District in Tonekabon County, Mazandaran province, Iran.

== Demographics ==
=== Population ===
At the time of the 2006 National Census, the village's population was 546 in 138 households. The following census in 2011 counted 497 people in 124 households. The 2016 census measured the population of the village as 537 people in 158 households.
