= Tilpordehsar =

Village in Mazandaran province, Iran

Tilpordehsar Persian: تيل پرده سر
- Village
- Location within Iran
- Coordinates: 36°46′30″N 50°57′38″E
- Country: Iran
- Province: Mazandaran
- County: Tonekabon
- District: Nashta
- Rural District: Katra

Population (2016)
  - Total: 621
- Time zone: UTC+3:30 (IRST)

Tilpordehsar (Persian: تيل پرده سر) (Note: Also romanized as Tīlpordehsar) is a village in Katra Rural District (Note: Formerly Nashtarud Rural District) of Nashta District in Tonekabon County, Mazandaran province, Iran.

== Demographics ==
=== Population ===
At the time of the 2006 National Census, the village's population was 598 in 157 households. The following census in 2011 counted 557 people in 168 households. The 2016 census measured the population of the village as 621 people in 212 households.
