= Khoshk Bur =

Village in Mazandaran province, Iran

Khoshk Bur Persian: خشكبور
- Village
- Location within Iran
- Coordinates: 36°44′06″N 51°00′52″E
- Country: Iran
- Province: Mazandaran
- County: Tonekabon
- District: Nashta
- Rural District: Tameshkol

Population (2016)
  - Total: 541
- Time zone: UTC+3:30 (IRST)

Khoshk Bur (Persian: خشكبور) (Note: Also romanized as Khoshk Būr; also known as Khoshkeh Būr) is a village in Tameshkol Rural District of Nashta District in Tonekabon County, Mazandaran province, Iran.

== Demographics ==
=== Population ===
At the time of the 2006 National Census, the village's population was 307 in 79 households. The following census in 2011 counted 335 people in 97 households. The 2016 census measured the population of the village as 541 people in 179 households.
