= Bond-e Bari (1) =

Coordinates: 27.7812°N 57.9941°E

Bond-e Bari بندبري
- Village
- Interactive map of Bond-e Bari
- Country: Iran
- Province: Kerman
- County: Qaleh Ganj
- Bakhsh: Central
- Rural District: Sorkh Qaleh

Population (2006)
  - Total: 619
- Time zone: UTC+3:30 (IRST)
  - Summer (DST): UTC+4:30 (IRDT)

Bond-e Bari (Persian: بندبري, also Romanized as Bond-e Barī) is a village in Sorkh Qaleh Rural District, in the Central District of Qaleh Ganj County, Kerman Province, Iran. At the 2006 census, its population was 619, in 128 families.
