= Qaleh Sar =

Qaleh Sar (Persian: قلعه سر) may refer to:

- Qaleh Sar, Neka, Mazandaran Province
- Qaleh Sar, Sari, Mazandaran Province
- Qaleh Sar, Tonekabon, Mazandaran Province
