= Dizeh (disambiguation) =

Dizeh is a city in Kurdistan Province, Iran.

Dizeh (Persian: ديزه) may also refer to various places in Iran:

- Dizeh, Marand, East Azerbaijan Province
- Dizeh, Osku, East Azerbaijan Province
- Dizeh, Shabestar, East Azerbaijan Province
- Dizeh, Varzaqan, East Azerbaijan Province
- Dizeh Posht, Mazandaran Province
- Dizeh, Khoy, West Azerbaijan Province
- Dizeh, Naqadeh, West Azerbaijan Province
- Dizeh, Urmia, West Azerbaijan Province
