= Makarud =

Makarud or Maka Rud or Makarood (Persian: مكارود) may refer to:

- Makarud, Kelardasht, Chalus County
- Maka Rud, Kuhestan, Chalus County
- Maka Rud, Tonekabon
