= Moallem Kuh =

Village in Mazandaran province, Iran

Moallem Kuh Persian: معلم كوه
- Village
- Location within Iran
- Coordinates: 36°43′23″N 50°59′05″E
- Country: Iran
- Province: Mazandaran
- County: Tonekabon
- District: Nashta
- Rural District: Tameshkol

Population (2016)
  - Total: 759
- Time zone: UTC+3:30 (IRST)

Moallem Kuh (Persian: معلم كوه) (Note: Also romanized as Mo‘allem Kūh) is a village in Tameshkol Rural District of Nashta District in Tonekabon County, Mazandaran province, Iran.

== Demographics ==
=== Population ===
At the time of the 2006 National Census, the village's population was 798 in 236 households. The following census in 2011 counted 818 people in 266 households. The 2016 census measured the population of the village as 759 people in 258 households.
