= Shamsabad, Sorkh Qaleh =

Shamsabad شمس اباد
- Village
- Location within Iran
- Coordinates: 27°49′07″N 58°25′00″E
- Country: Iran
- Province: Kerman
- County: Qaleh Ganj
- Bakhsh: Central
- Rural District: Sorkh Qaleh

Population (2006)
  - Total: 257
- Time zone: UTC+3:30 (IRST)
  - Summer (DST): UTC+4:30 (IRDT)

Shamsabad (Persian: شمس اباد, also Romanized as Shamsābād) is a village in Sorkh Qaleh Rural District, in the Central District of Qaleh Ganj County, Kerman province, Iran. At the 2006 census, its population was 257, in 48 families.
