= Zavar, Mazandaran =

Village in Mazandaran province, Iran

Zavar Persian: زوار
- Village
- Location within Iran
- Coordinates: 36°45′17″N 50°58′22″E
- Country: Iran
- Province: Mazandaran
- County: Tonekabon
- District: Nashta
- Rural District: Katra

Population (2016)
  - Total: 762
- Time zone: UTC+3:30 (IRST)

Zavar (Persian: زوار) (Note: Also romanized as Zavār) is a village in Katra Rural District (Note: Formerly Nashtarud Rural District) of Nashta District in Tonekabon County, Mazandaran province, Iran.

== Demographics ==
=== Population ===
At the time of the 2006 National Census, the village's population was 763 in 217 households. The following census in 2011 counted 768 people in 252 households. The 2016 census measured the population of the village as 762 people in 270 households.
