= Pol Sara =

Village in Mazandaran province, Iran

Pol Sara Persian: پل سرا
- Village
- Location within Iran
- Coordinates: 36°42′40″N 50°59′11″E
- Country: Iran
- Province: Mazandaran
- County: Tonekabon
- District: Nashta
- Rural District: Tameshkol

Population (2016)
  - Total: 1,057
- Time zone: UTC+3:30 (IRST)

Pol Sara (Persian: پل سرا) (Note: Also romanized as Pol Sarā) is a village in Tameshkol Rural District of Nashta District in Tonekabon County, Mazandaran province, Iran.

== Demographics ==
=== Population ===
At the time of the 2006 National Census, the village's population was 1,090 in 296 households. The following census in 2011 counted 1,091 people in 341 households. The 2016 census measured the population of the village as 1,057 people in 365 households.
