= Dinar Sara =

Village in Mazandaran province, Iran

Dinar Sara Persian: دينارسرا
- Village
- Location within Iran
- Coordinates: 36°41′12″N 50°59′02″E
- Country: Iran
- Province: Mazandaran
- County: Tonekabon
- District: Nashta
- Rural District: Tameshkol

Population (2016)
  - Total: 537
- Time zone: UTC+3:30 (IRST)

Dinar Sara (Persian: دينارسرا) (Note: Also romanized as Dīnār Sarā) is a village in Tameshkol Rural District of Nashta District in Tonekabon County, Mazandaran province, Iran.

== Demographics ==
=== Population ===
At the time of the 2006 National Census, the village's population was 718 in 180 households. The following census in 2011 counted 553 people in 161 households. The 2016 census measured the population of the village as 537 people in 168 households.
