= Faqihabad =

Village in Mazandaran province, Iran

Faqihabad Persian: فقيه اباد
- Village
- Location within Iran
- Coordinates: 36°43′17″N 51°01′56″E
- Country: Iran
- Province: Mazandaran
- County: Tonekabon
- District: Nashta
- Rural District: Tameshkol

Population (2016)
  - Total: 1,110
- Time zone: UTC+3:30 (IRST)

Faqihabad (Persian: فقيه اباد) (Note: Also romanized as Faqīhābād) is a village in Tameshkol Rural District of Nashta District in Tonekabon County, Mazandaran province, Iran.

== Demographics ==
=== Population ===
At the time of the 2006 National Census, the village's population was 1,043 in 279 households. The following census in 2011 counted 1,151 people in 347 households. The 2016 census measured the population of the village as 1,110 people in 366 households.
