= Katra, Mazandaran =

Village in Mazandaran province, Iran

Katra Persian: كترا
- Village
- Location within Iran
- Coordinates: 36°44′16″N 50°59′09″E
- Country: Iran
- Province: Mazandaran
- County: Tonekabon
- District: Nashta
- Rural District: Katra

Population (2016)
  - Total: 1,832
- Time zone: UTC+3:30 (IRST)

Katra (Persian: كترا) (Note: Also romanized as Katrā) is a village in, and the capital of, Katra Rural District (Note: Formerly Nashtarud Rural District) in Nashta District of Tonekabon County, Mazandaran province, Iran.

== Demographics ==
=== Population ===
At the time of the 2006 National Census, the village's population was 1,914 in 543 households. The following census in 2011 counted 1,887 people in 607 households. The 2016 census measured the population of the village as 1,832 people in 626 households, the most populous in its rural district.
