= Borjak-e Hasan =

Borjak-e Hasan برجک حسن
- Village
- Location within Iran
- Coordinates: 27°40′27″N 58°05′46″E
- Country: Iran
- Province: Kerman
- County: Qaleh Ganj
- Bakhsh: Central
- Rural District: Sorkh Qaleh

Population (2006)
  - Total: 392
- Time zone: UTC+3:30 (IRST)
  - Summer (DST): UTC+4:30 (IRDT)

Borjak-e Hasan (Persian: برجک حسن, also Romanized as Borjak-e Ḩasan) is a village in Sorkh Qaleh Rural District, in the Central District of Qaleh Ganj County, Kerman Province, Iran. At the 2006 census, its population was 392, in 86 families.
