= Palat Kaleh =

Palat Kaleh may refer to:

- Palat Kaleh, Gilan in the Gilan province of Iran
- Palat Kaleh, Mazandaran in the Mazandaran province of Iran
