= Miyanshahr =

Miyanshahr or Mianshahr (Persian: ميان شهر) may refer to:

- Miyanshahr, Fars
- Miyanshahr, Kerman
- Miyanshahr, Sistan and Baluchestan
