= Rudgar Mahalleh =

Village in Mazandaran province, Iran

Rudgar Mahalleh Persian: رودگرمحله
- Village
- Location within Iran
- Coordinates: 36°43′01″N 50°59′51″E
- Country: Iran
- Province: Mazandaran
- County: Tonekabon
- District: Nashta
- Rural District: Tameshkol

Population (2016)
  - Total: 665
- Time zone: UTC+3:30 (IRST)

Rudgar Mahalleh (Persian: رودگرمحله) (Note: Also romanized as Rūdgar Maḩalleh) is a village in Tameshkol Rural District of Nashta District in Tonekabon County, Mazandaran province, Iran.

== Demographics ==
=== Population ===
At the time of the 2006 National Census, the village's population was 704 in 200 households. The following census in 2011 counted 681 people in 209 households. The 2016 census measured the population of the village as 665 people in 216 households.
