= Ahugan, Qaleh Ganj =

Village in Kerman province, Iran

Ahugan Persian: اهوگان
- Village
- Location within Iran
- Coordinates: 27°42′28″N 57°56′35″E
- Country: Iran
- Province: Kerman
- County: Qaleh Ganj
- District: Sorkh Qaleh
- Rural District: Sorkh Qaleh

Population (2016)
  - Total: 1,219
- Time zone: UTC+3:30 (IRST)

Ahugan (Persian: اهوگان) (Note: Also romanized as Āhūgān; also known as Āhūān-e Bālā) is a village in Sorkh Qaleh Rural District of Sorkh Qaleh District, Qaleh Ganj County, Kerman province, Iran.

== Demographics ==
=== Population ===
At the time of the 2006 National Census, the village's population was 1,359 in 247 households, when it was in the Central District. The following census in 2011 counted 1.742 people in 481 households. The 2016 census measured the population of the village as 1,219 people in 335 households. It was the most populous village in its rural district.

After the census, the rural district was separated from the district in the formation of Sorkh Qaleh District.
