= Diz Posht =

Diz Posht ديزپشت
- Village
- Location within Iran
- Coordinates: 36°41′46″N 50°58′25″E
- Country: Iran
- Province: Mazandaran
- County: Tonekabon
- Bakhsh: Nashta
- Rural District: Katra

Population (2016)
  - Total: 112
- Time zone: UTC+3:30 (IRST)

Diz Posht (Persian: ديزپشت, also Romanized as Dīz Posht; also known as Dīzeh Posht) is a village in Katra Rural District, Nashta District, Tonekabon County, Mazandaran Province, Iran.

At the time of the 2006 National Census, the village's population was 106 in 28 households. The following census in 2011 counted 116 people in 33 households. The 2016 census measured the population of the village as 112 people in 36 households.
