= Shamzun-e Chah Bagh =

Shamzun-e Chah Bagh شمزون چاه باغ
- Village
- Location within Iran
- Coordinates: 27°35′36″N 57°56′48″E
- Country: Iran
- Province: Kerman
- County: Qaleh Ganj
- Bakhsh: Central
- Rural District: Qaleh Ganj

Population (2006)
  - Total: 504
- Time zone: UTC+3:30 (IRST)
  - Summer (DST): UTC+4:30 (IRDT)

Shamzun-e Chah Bagh (Persian: شمزون چاه باغ, also Romanized as Shamzūn-e Chāh Bāgh; also known as Shamzān-e Chāh Bāgh) is a village in Qaleh Ganj Rural District, in the Central District of Qaleh Ganj County, Kerman Province, Iran. At the 2006 census, its population was 504, in 90 families.
