= Shamzan-e Hiyet =

Shamzan-e Hiyet شمزان هيئت
- Village
- Interactive map of Shamzan-e Hiyet
- Country: Iran
- Province: Kerman
- County: Qaleh Ganj
- Bakhsh: Central
- Rural District: Qaleh Ganj

Population (2006)
  - Total: 470
- Time zone: UTC+3:30 (IRST)
  - Summer (DST): UTC+4:30 (IRDT)

Shamzan-e Hiyet (Persian: شمزان هيئت, also Romanized as Shamzān-e Hīyet) is a village in Qaleh Ganj Rural District, in the Central District of Qaleh Ganj County, Kerman Province, Iran. At the 2006 census, its population was 470, in 91 families.
