= Rud-e Posht, Tonekabon =

Village in Mazandaran province, Iran

Rud-e Posht Persian: رودپشت
- Village
- Location within Iran
- Coordinates: 36°45′48″N 50°57′32″E
- Country: Iran
- Province: Mazandaran
- County: Tonekabon
- District: Nashta
- Rural District: Katra

Population (2016)
  - Total: 575
- Time zone: UTC+3:30 (IRST)

Rud-e Posht (Persian: رودپشت) (Note: Also romanized as Rūd-e Posht; also known as Rūd-e Posht-e Bālā) is a village in Katra Rural District (Note: Formerly Nashtarud Rural District) of Nashta District in Tonekabon County, Mazandaran province, Iran.

== Demographics ==
=== Population ===
At the time of the 2006 National Census, the village's population was 529 in 140 households. The following census in 2011 counted 541 people in 170 households. The 2016 census measured the population of the village as 575 people in 205 households.
