= Shamzan-e Jehadiyeh =

Shamzan-e Jehadiyeh شمزان جهاديه
- Village
- Location within Iran
- Coordinates: 27°36′55″N 57°56′26″E
- Country: Iran
- Province: Kerman
- County: Qaleh Ganj
- Bakhsh: Central
- Rural District: Qaleh Ganj

Population (2006)
  - Total: 834
- Time zone: UTC+3:30 (IRST)
  - Summer (DST): UTC+4:30 (IRDT)

Shamzan-e Jehadiyeh (Persian: شمزان جهاديه, also romanized as Shamzān-e Jehādīyeh; also known as Shamzān) is a village in Qaleh Ganj Rural District, in the Central District of Qaleh Ganj County, Kerman Province, Iran. At the 2006 census, its population was 834, in 163 families.
