= Miyanshahr, Kerman =

Miyanshahr ميان شهر
- Village
- Location within Iran
- Coordinates: 27°30′40″N 57°54′22″E
- Country: Iran
- Province: Kerman
- County: Qaleh Ganj
- Bakhsh: Central
- Rural District: Qaleh Ganj

Population (2006)
  - Total: 414
- Time zone: UTC+3:30 (IRST)
  - Summer (DST): UTC+4:30 (IRDT)

Miyanshahr (Persian: ميان شهر, also Romanized as Mīyānshahr; also known as Mīyānshahr-e Sūrgābād) is a village in Qaleh Ganj Rural District, in the Central District of Qaleh Ganj County, Kerman Province, Iran. At the 2006 census, its population was 414, in 97 families.
