= Shamsabad, Tonekabon =

Shamsabad شمس آباد
- Village
- Interactive map of Shamsabad
- Coordinates: 36.754°N 50.995°E
- Country: Iran
- Province: Mazandaran
- County: Tonekabon
- Bakhsh: Nashta
- Rural District: Katra

Population (2016)
  - Total: 451
- Time zone: UTC+3:30 (IRST)

Shamsabad (Persian: شمس آباد, also Romanized as Shamsābād) is a village in Katra Rural District, Nashta District, Tonekabon County, Mazandaran Province, Iran. At the 2006 census, its population was 466, in 135 families.

At the time of the 2006 National Census, the village's population was 466 in 135 households. The following census in 2011 counted 392 people in 127 households. The 2016 census measured the population of the village as 451 people in 159 households.
