= Tubon, Tonekabon =

Village in Mazandaran province, Iran

Tubon Persian: توبن
- Village
- Location within Iran
- Coordinates: 36°43′07″N 51°00′33″E
- Country: Iran
- Province: Mazandaran
- County: Tonekabon
- District: Nashta
- Rural District: Tameshkol

Population (2016)
  - Total: 1,146
- Time zone: UTC+3:30 (IRST)

Tubon (Persian: توبن) (Note: Also romanized as Tūbon; also known as Tūbotn) is a village in Tameshkol Rural District of Nashta District in Tonekabon County, Mazandaran province, Iran.

== Demographics ==
=== Population ===
At the time of the 2006 National Census, the village's population was 1,184 in 331 households. The following census in 2011 counted 1,150 people in 354 households. The 2016 census measured the population of the village as 1,146 people in 381 households, the most populous in its rural district.
