= Talesh Mahalleh, Tonekabon =

Village in Mazandaran province, Iran

Talesh Mahalleh Persian: طالش محله
- Village
- Location within Iran
- Coordinates: 36°43′13″N 50°58′27″E
- Country: Iran
- Province: Mazandaran
- County: Tonekabon
- District: Nashta
- Rural District: Katra

Population (2016)
  - Total: 521
- Time zone: UTC+3:30 (IRST)

Talesh Mahalleh (Persian: طالش محله) (Note: Also romanized as Ţālesh Maḩalleh; also known as Jabānesh Maḩalleh) is a village in Katra Rural District (Note: Formerly Nashtarud Rural District) of Nashta District in Tonekabon County, Mazandaran province, Iran.

== Demographics ==
=== Population ===
At the time of the 2006 National Census, the village's population was 507 in 143 households. The following census in 2011 counted 481 people in 153 households. The 2016 census measured the population of the village as 521 people in 180 households.
