= Tameshkol =

Village in Mazandaran province, Iran

Tameshkol Persian: تمشكل
- Village
- Location within Iran
- Coordinates: 36°43′33″N 51°00′20″E
- Country: Iran
- Province: Mazandaran
- County: Tonekabon
- District: Nashta
- Rural District: Tameshkol

Population (2016)
  - Total: 827
- Time zone: UTC+3:30 (IRST)

Tameshkol (Persian: تمشكل) is a village in, and the capital of, Tameshkol Rural District in Nashta District of Tonekabon County, Mazandaran province, Iran.

== Demographics ==
=== Population ===
At the time of the 2006 National Census, the village's population was 610 in 179 households. The following census in 2011 counted 672 people in 206 households. The 2016 census measured the population of the village as 827 people in 281 households.
