= Rajshree Singh =

Indian politician

Rajshree singh

Member of the Madhya Pradesh Legislative Assembly
- Constituency: Shamshabad

Personal details
- Born: 1967 or 1968 (age 57–58) Satna
- Party: Bharatiya Janta Party
- Spouse: Rudra Pratap Singh
- Website: rajshreesingh.com

Rajshree Singh is an Indian politician. She was elected to the Madhya Pradesh Legislative Assembly from Shamshabad.

== See also ==
- Madhya Pradesh Legislative Assembly
- 2013 Madhya Pradesh Legislative Assembly election
- 2008 Madhya Pradesh Legislative Assembly election
