= Gelu, Qaleh Ganj =

Gelu گلو
- Village
- Location within Iran
- Coordinates: 27°41′36″N 57°56′28″E
- Country: Iran
- Province: Kerman
- County: Qaleh Ganj
- Bakhsh: Central
- Rural District: Sorkh Qaleh

Population (2006)
  - Total: 1,235
- Time zone: UTC+3:30 (IRST)
  - Summer (DST): UTC+4:30 (IRDT)

Gelu (Persian: گلو, also Romanized as Gelū; also known as Āhūān-e Vasaţ and Gelū Āhūgān) is a village in Sorkh Qaleh Rural District, in the Central District of Qaleh Ganj County, Kerman Province, Iran. At the 2006 census, its population was 1,235, in 269 families.
