= Dulab Rural District (Qaleh Ganj County) =

Rural district in Kerman province, Iran

Dulab Rural District Persian: دهستان دولاب
- Rural District
- Location within Iran
- Coordinates: 27°37′06″N 57°55′10″E
- Country: Iran
- Province: Kerman
- County: Qaleh Ganj
- District: Central
- Capital: Dulab
- Time zone: UTC+3:30 (IRST)

Dulab Rural District (Persian: دهستان دولاب) is in the Central District of Qaleh Ganj County, Kerman province, Iran. Its capital is the village of Dulab, whose population at the time of the 2016 National Census was 1,253 people in 357 households.

== History ==
Dulab Rural District was created in the Central District after the 2016 census.
