= Əmirməhmud =

- Location within Azerbaijan
- Coordinates: 40°35′56″N 47°33′34″E
- Country: Azerbaijan
- Rayon: Agdash
- Municipality: Şəmsabad
- Time zone: UTC+4 (AZT)
  - Summer (DST): UTC+5 (AZT)

Əmirməhmud (also, Əmirmahmud and Emirmakhmud) is a village in the Agdash Rayon of Azerbaijan. The village forms part of the municipality of Şəmsabad.
