= Palat Kaleh, Mazandaran =

Village in Mazandaran province, Iran

Palat Kaleh Persian: پلت كله
- Village
- Location within Iran
- Coordinates: 36°46′04″N 50°58′39″E
- Country: Iran
- Province: Mazandaran
- County: Tonekabon
- District: Nashta
- Rural District: Katra

Population (2016)
  - Total: 677
- Time zone: UTC+3:30 (IRST)

Palat Kaleh (Persian: پلت كله) is a village in Katra Rural District (Note: Formerly Nashtarud Rural District) of Nashta District in Tonekabon County, Mazandaran province, Iran.

== Demographics ==
=== Population ===
At the time of the 2006 National Census, the village's population was 767 in 218 households. The following census in 2011 counted 712 people in 221 households. The 2016 census measured the population of the village as 677 people in 224 households.
