= Qaleh Ganj =

City in Kerman province, Iran

Qaleh Ganj Persian: قلعه گنج
- City
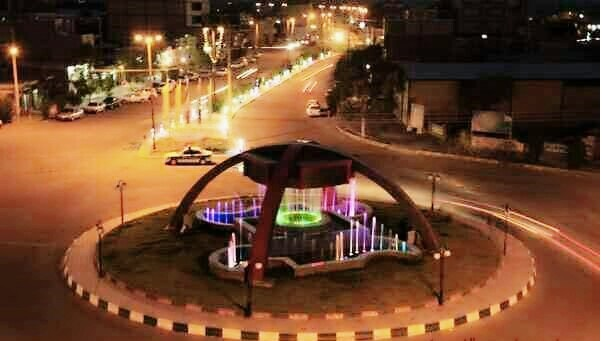
- Azadegan Blvd., Vali-ye Asr Square

- Location within Iran
- Coordinates: 27°31′30″N 57°52′48″E
- Country: Iran
- Province: Kerman
- County: Qaleh Ganj
- District: Central

Government
  - Shahrdar: Jasem Ahmadi

Area
  - Total: 14,200 km^{2} (5,500 sq mi)

Population (2016)
  - Total: 13,169
  - Density: 0.927/km^{2} (2.40/sq mi)
- Time zone: UTC+3:30 (IRST)
- Area code: +34

Qaleh Ganj (Persian: قلعه گنج) (Note: Also romanized as Qal‘eh Ganj and Qal‘eh-ye Ganj; also known as Ghal‘eh Ganj, Kalāteh-ye Ganj, Kalāt-i-Ganj, and Moḩammadābād) is a city in the Central District of Qaleh Ganj County, Kerman province, Iran, serving as capital of both the county and the district. It was the administrative center for Qaleh Ganj Rural District until its capital was transferred to the village of Shamsabad.

== History ==
Investigation on the history of this city is very difficult and dramatic. It Belongs to the pre-Islamic and Nativity which shows relatives who have been living everywhere in this city. Remains from this civilization show the city is over 5,000 years old. Now people who live in this city are Persians, Balouch, Arabs, Bakhtiari and Afro-Iranians.

== Demographics ==
=== Language ===
The local language of Qale Ganj is Balochi, and a small minority speak Bashkardi which is closely related to the Garmsiri group.

=== Population ===
At the time of the 2006 National Census, the city's population was 11,560 in 2,443 households. The following census in 2011 counted 12,663 people in 3,034 households. The 2016 census measured the population of the city as 13,169 people in 3,638 households.
