= Qaraqan Saatlı =

- Location within Azerbaijan
- Coordinates: 40°36′N 47°33′E
- Country: Azerbaijan
- Rayon: Agdash
- Time zone: UTC+4 (AZT)
  - Summer (DST): UTC+5 (AZT)

Qaraqan Saatlı (also, Qarağan Saatlı, Karagan Saatly, and Karagansaat) is a village in the Agdash Rayon of Azerbaijan. The village forms part of the municipality of Şəmsabad.
