= Pemba Dorje Sherpa =

Nepalese Sherpa mountaineer

Personal information
- Citizenship: Nepal
- Born: 1977 (age 48–49) Beding, Dolakha District, Nepal

Climbing career
- Known for: Formerly recognized fastest ascent of Mount Everest (rejected in 2017); Summited Mount Everest 21 times; Guinness World Record for "Most siblings to have climbed Everest", together with 7 of his siblings

Pemba Dorje Sherpa (born 1977) is a Nepalese Sherpa mountaineer. He was formerly recognized as setting the record for the fastest ascent of Mount Everest.

== Climbing career ==
He was born in the village of Beding in Rolwaling Valley, Dolakha District. According to The Himalayan Database, he made his first successful ascent of Mount Everest on 17 May 2000, at the age of 23.

=== Record Everest ascent and following disputes ===
On 23 May 2003, Pemba Dorje Sherpa set a record for the fastest ascent of Mount Everest. He started from Everest base camp at 5,350m and reached the summit in 12 hours and 45 minutes, over four hours faster than the previous record set in 2000 by Babu Chiri Sherpa (16 hours and 65 minutes). This record was broken just three days later by Lhakpa Gelu, who finished the ascent in 10 hours and 56 minutes.

The following year, Pemba Dorje claimed to have beaten the record with a new fastest ascent of Mount Everest, taking just 8 hours and 10 minutes on 21 May 2004. Once at the summit, Pemba Dorje established radio contact with the liaison officer at base camp and described items that had been left behind by other climbers the previous day, to prove his successful summit. However, there is no photographic evidence, nor are there any eyewitnesses that could confirm the record, as Pemba Dorje was climbing alone that day. Only his starting time at Everest base camp was clearly documented. The record was subsequently called into question by the previous record holder and other climbers. After an investigation, the record was officially confirmed by Ministry of Culture, Tourism and Civil Aviation in September 2005, and Pemba Dorje was recognized as the world record holder by Guinness World Records.

In 2013, previous record holder Lhakpa Gelu filed a case against Pemba Dorje at the Supreme Court of Nepal. In November 2017, the court ruled in favour of Lhakpa Gelu and ordered Pemba Dorje to be stripped of his record, citing lack of evidence. Pemba Dorje's record has since been revoked by the Nepal Ministry of Tourism and Guinness World Records and Lhakpa Gelu is formally recognized as having set the Everest speed record.

=== Other achievements ===
Between 2000 and 2021, Pemba Dorje Sherpa has reached the summit of Mount Everest 21 times, which places him in the list of people with most Everest ascents.

Pemba Dorje Sherpa holds the world record for "Most siblings to have climbed Everest", together with seven of his siblings.

He has summited the eight-thousanders Lhotse and Manaslu.

He works in Nepal as a mountain porter and expedition coordinator on Mount Everest and other mountains. In 2021, he was part of the team that helped Hong Kong climber Ada Tsang Yin-Hung become the fastest women to climb Mount Everest in a record time of 25 hours and 50 minutes.
