= Sorkh Qaleh, Kerman =

Village in Kerman province, Iran

Sorkh Qaleh Persian: سرخ قلعه
- Village
- Location within Iran
- Coordinates: 27°47′02″N 57°56′49″E
- Country: Iran
- Province: Kerman
- County: Qaleh Ganj
- District: Sorkh Qaleh
- Rural District: Sorkh Qaleh

Population (2016)
  - Total: 776
- Time zone: UTC+3:30 (IRST)

Sorkh Qaleh (Persian: سرخ قلعه) (Note: Also romanized as Sorkh Qal‘eh and Sorkhqal‘eh) is a village in Sorkh Qaleh Rural District of Sorkh Qaleh District, Qaleh Ganj County, Kerman province, Iran, serving as capital of both the district and the rural district.

== Demographics ==
=== Population ===
At the time of the 2006 National Census, the village's population was 786 in 167 households, when it was in the Central District. The following census in 2011 counted 1,118 people in 266 households. The 2016 census measured the population of the village as 776 people in 223 households.

After the census, the rural district was separated from the district in the formation of Sorkh Qaleh District.
