= Surya Prakash Meena =

Indian politician

Member of the Madhya Pradesh Legislative Assembly
- In office 2008-2018, 2023 – present
- Constituency: Shamshabad

Personal details
- Party: Bharatiya Janata Party
- Profession: Politician

Surya Prakash Meena is an Indian politician from Madhya Pradesh. He is a three time elected Member of the Madhya Pradesh Legislative Assembly from 2008, 2013, and 2023, representing Shamshabad Assembly constituency as a Member of the Bharatiya Janata Party.

== See also ==
- List of chief ministers of Madhya Pradesh
- Madhya Pradesh Legislative Assembly
