= Shamsabad, Qaleh Ganj =

Village in Kerman province, Iran

Shamsabad Persian: شمس اباد
- Village
- Location within Iran
- Coordinates: 27°26′24″N 57°54′08″E
- Country: Iran
- Province: Kerman
- County: Qaleh Ganj
- District: Central
- Rural District: Qaleh Ganj

Population (2016)
  - Total: 1,151
- Time zone: UTC+3:30 (IRST)

Shamsabad (Persian: شمس اباد) (Note: Also romanized as Shamsābād) is a village in, and the capital of, Qaleh Ganj Rural District of the Central District of Qaleh Ganj County, Kerman province, Iran. The rural district was previously administered from the city of Qaleh Ganj.

== Demographics ==
=== Population ===
At the time of the 2006 National Census, the village's population was 1,048 in 226 households. The following census in 2011 counted 1,100 people in 286 households. The 2016 census measured the population of the village as 1,151 people in 321 households.
