= Borjak-e Seyfollah =

Borjak-e Seyfollah برجك سيف اله
- Village
- Location within Iran
- Coordinates: 28°01′39″N 58°31′24″E
- Country: Iran
- Province: Kerman
- County: Qaleh Ganj
- Bakhsh: Central
- Rural District: Sorkh Qaleh

Population (2006)
  - Total: 83
- Time zone: UTC+3:30 (IRST)
  - Summer (DST): UTC+4:30 (IRDT)

Borjak-e Seyfollah (Persian: برجك سيف اله; also known as Barjak) is a village in Sorkh Qaleh Rural District, in the Central District of Qaleh Ganj County, Kerman Province, Iran. At the 2006 census, its population was 83, in 23 families.
