= Mak Rud =

Mak Rud مكرود
- Village
- Location within Iran
- Coordinates: 36°44′33″N 51°00′11″E
- Country: Iran
- Province: Mazandaran
- County: Tonekabon
- Bakhsh: Nashta
- Rural District: Tameshkol

Population (2006)
  - Total: 244
- Time zone: UTC+3:30 (IRST)
  - Summer (DST): UTC+4:30 (IRDT)

Mak Rud (Persian: مكرود, also Romanized as Mak Rūd; also known as Makā Rūd) is a village in Tameshkol Rural District, Nashta District, Tonekabon County, Mazandaran Province, Iran. At the 2006 census, its population was 244, in 67 families.
