= Shamsabad, Anbarabad =

Shamsabad شمس اباد
- Village
- Location within Iran
- Coordinates: 28°32′56″N 57°50′00″E
- Country: Iran
- Province: Kerman
- County: Anbarabad
- Bakhsh: Central
- Rural District: Mohammadabad

Population (2006)
  - Total: 151
- Time zone: UTC+3:30 (IRST)
  - Summer (DST): UTC+4:30 (IRDT)

Shamsabad (Persian: شمس اباد, also Romanized as Shamsābād) is a village in Mohammadabad Rural District, in the Central District of Anbarabad County, Kerman province, Iran. At the 2006 census, its population was 151, in 25 families.
