= Şəmsabad =

- Municipality
- Location within Azerbaijan
- Coordinates: 40°37′42″N 47°34′36″E
- Country: Azerbaijan
- Rayon: Agdash

Population
  - Total: 1,604
- Time zone: UTC+4 (AZT)
  - Summer (DST): UTC+5 (AZT)

Şəmsabad (also, Shamsabad) is a village and municipality in the Agdash Rayon of Azerbaijan. It has a population of 1,604. The municipality consists of the villages of Şəmsabad, Əmirməhmud, and Qaraqan Saatlı.
