= Sorkh Qaleh, North Khorasan =

Sorkh Qaleh سرخ قلعه
- Village
- Location within Iran
- Coordinates: 37°11′06″N 57°47′45″E
- Country: Iran
- Province: North Khorasan
- County: Esfarayen
- Bakhsh: Central
- Rural District: Milanlu

Population (2006)
  - Total: 274
- Time zone: UTC+3:30 (IRST)
  - Summer (DST): UTC+4:30 (IRDT)

Sorkh Qaleh (Persian: سرخ قلعه, also Romanized as Sorkh Qal‘eh; also known as Sorkh Qal‘eh-ye Torkhā) is a village in Milanlu Rural District, in the Central District of Esfarayen County, North Khorasan Province, Iran. At the 2006 census, its population was 274, in 56 families.
