= Shamsabad, Khusf =

Shamsabad شمس اباد
- Village
- Location within Iran
- Coordinates: 32°20′45″N 59°07′41″E
- Country: Iran
- Province: South Khorasan
- County: Khusf
- Bakhsh: Jolgeh-e Mazhan
- Rural District: Qaleh Zari

Population (2006)
  - Total: 11
- Time zone: UTC+3:30 (IRST)
  - Summer (DST): UTC+4:30 (IRDT)

Shamsabad (Persian: شمس اباد, also Romanized as Shamsābād) is a village in Qaleh Zari Rural District, Jolgeh-e Mazhan District, Khusf County, South Khorasan province, Iran. At the 2006 census, its population was 11, in 4 families.
