= Gelu, Satu Mare =

Village of Saturday Mare in Romania

Coordinates: 47.6840°N 22.7830°E

Gelu is a village of Satu Mare in Romania. It is named after the Romanian duke Gelou.
