= Lakpa Gelu =

Nepalese mountain climber

- ल्हाक्पा घेलु
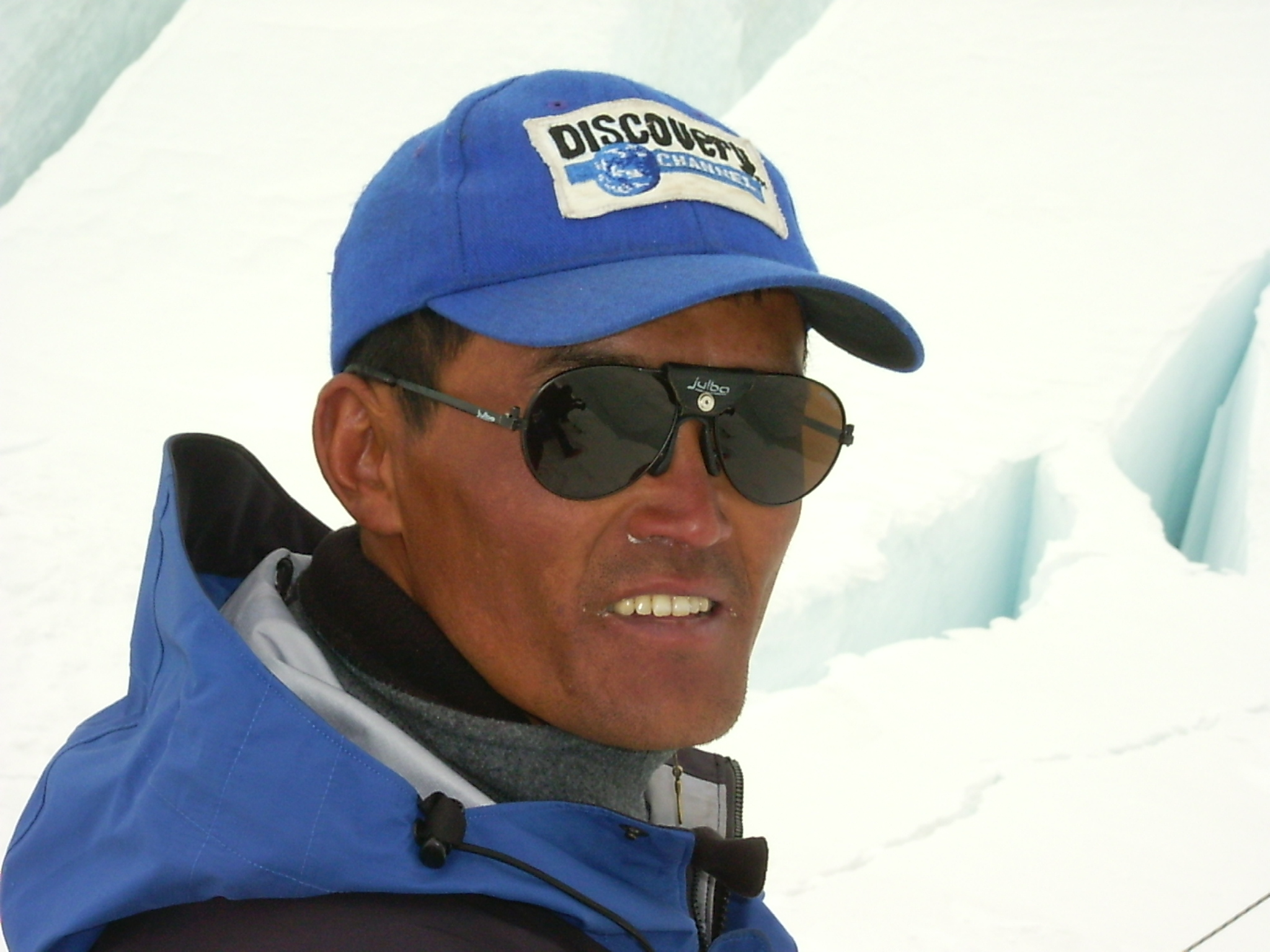
- Picture taken during the Discovery Channel (Canada) expedition in 2007
- Born: June 23, 1967 (age 59); Jubing, Kharikhola, Solukhumbu, Nepal
- Occupation: Sherpa
- Known for: World's fastest climbing of Mount Everest

Lakpa Gelu (Nepali: ल्हाक्पा घेलु) (born June 23, 1967), often spelled Lhakpa, is a Nepalese Sherpa climber born in Jubing, Kharikhola, Solukhumbu, Nepal. He is known for previously setting the world record for the fastest climb of Mount Everest (the world's tallest mountain at 8,848 meters, known to the Nepalese as "Sagarmatha") in only 10 hours 56 minutes and 46 seconds. Gelu's record-breaking trip was his tenth trip to the summit of Mount Everest.

== Personal life ==
Lhakpa Gelu was born around June 23, 1967 in the Solukhumbu of Nepal. The ethnic Sherpa community in Nepal does not record exact birth dates, though, so it is impossible to know his precise birth date.

Lhakpa Gelu comes from a family of climbers. His older brother died in 1991 while climbing Annapurna, and his youngest brother has also climbed Mount Everest. He is married to Fulli and has three children.

In December 2006, Lhakpa Gelu moved to Utah. Despite his mountaineering accomplishments, Lhakpa struggled financially, as Sherpas are paid far less than Western guides. In Utah, he had difficulty finding work as a mountain guide, so instead he had to work at a coffee house, installing signs, and delivering pizzas while searching for employment as an expedition guide.

In 2008, Lhakpa began working as a guide for Alpine Ascents International, where he has guided expeditions up Mount Rainier and Aconcagua.

As of October 2026, he appears to own and operate the Wildberry Restaurant at the entrance to Mt Rainier National Park. The restaurant has a display of his climbing gear and records held, and he is regularly present serving Himalayan dishes and talking with guests.

== Speed climb of Everest ==
Gelu started for the summit at 5:00 p.m. on May 25, 2003, and reached on the summit at 3:56:46 a.m. on May 26. He returned to Base Camp at 11:20 a.m. on the 26th. (It is also reported that upon reaching the top, Gelu hoisted the Nepalese flag on a 6-foot-tall (1.8 m) brass pole.) The total time of his climb from Base Camp to the summit and back to Base Camp was 18 hours 20 minutes.

The record he beat (12 hours 45 minutes) was set just a few days earlier on May 23, 2003 by 25-year-old Pemba Dorje Sherpa from Rolwaling Himal.

Lakpa Gelu was the climbing Sardar of the 12-member "Jubiläums Expedition Mt. Everest 2003". He began his ascent of Everest from the Southeast Ridge under the leadership of Eckhard Schmitt, a 56-year-old mountaineer from Schaftlach, Germany.

On May 28, 2026, American ultrarunner Tyler Andrews broke Lhakpa Gelu's speed record by climbing from Everest Base Camp to the summit in 9 hours and 55 minutes.

== Other ascents ==
In addition to over a dozen Everest summits, Lhakpa has also summitted Cho Oyu and Ama Dablam in the Himalayas.

In 2007, Lhakpa climbed Everest to raise money for an elementary school in his hometown in Nepal and to increase public awareness of the contributions of the Sherpa people to Himalayan mountaineering.

== See also ==
- List of Mount Everest summiters by number of times to the summit
- List of Mount Everest records
- Lhakpa Sherpa (female Everest mountaineer)
- List of Mount Everest guides
