= Shamsabad, Golgir =

Shamsabad شمس اباد
- Village
- Location within Iran
- Coordinates: 31°46′29″N 49°28′56″E
- Country: Iran
- Province: Khuzestan
- County: Masjed Soleyman
- Bakhsh: Golgir
- Rural District: Tombi Golgir

Population (2006)
  - Total: 97
- Time zone: UTC+3:30 (IRST)
  - Summer (DST): UTC+4:30 (IRDT)

Shamsabad (Persian: شمس اباد, also Romanized as Shamsābād) is a village in Tombi Golgir Rural District, Golgir District, Masjed Soleyman County, Khuzestan province, Iran. At the 2006 census, its population was 97, in 17 families.
