= Shamsabad, Rivand =

Shamsabad شمس اباد
- Village
- Location within Iran
- Coordinates: 36°06′55″N 58°46′38″E
- Country: Iran
- Province: Razavi Khorasan
- County: Nishapur
- Bakhsh: Central
- Rural District: Rivand

Population (2006)
  - Total: 159
- Time zone: UTC+3:30 (IRST)
  - Summer (DST): UTC+4:30 (IRDT)

Shamsabad (Persian: شمس اباد, also Romanized as Shamsābād) is a village in Rivand Rural District, in the Central District of Nishapur County, Razavi Khorasan province, Iran. At the 2006 census, its population was 159, in 53 families.
