= Shamsabad, Khomeyn =

Shamsabad شمس اباد
- Village
- Location within Iran
- Coordinates: 33°37′49″N 50°01′23″E
- Country: Iran
- Province: Markazi
- County: Khomeyn
- Bakhsh: Central
- Rural District: Rostaq

Population (2006)
  - Total: 15
- Time zone: UTC+3:30 (IRST)
  - Summer (DST): UTC+4:30 (IRDT)

Shamsabad (Persian: شمس اباد, also Romanized as Shamsābād) is a village in Rostaq Rural District, in the Central District of Khomeyn County, Markazi province, Iran. At the 2006 census, its population was 15, in 5 families.
