= Shamsabad, Kermanshah =

Shamsabad شمس اباد
- Village
- Location within Iran
- Coordinates: 34°16′26″N 47°25′15″E
- Country: Iran
- Province: Kermanshah
- County: Harsin
- Bakhsh: Bisotun
- Rural District: Shirez

Population (2006)
  - Total: 81
- Time zone: UTC+3:30 (IRST)
  - Summer (DST): UTC+4:30 (IRDT)

Shamsabad (Persian: شمس اباد, also Romanized as Shamsābād) is a village in Shirez Rural District, Bisotun District, Harsin County, Kermanshah province, Iran. At the 2006 census, its population was 81, in 19 families.
