= Shamsabad-e Borzu =

Shamsabad-e Borzu شمس ابادبرزو
- Village
- Location within Iran
- Coordinates: 29°57′56″N 52°51′11″E
- Country: Iran
- Province: Fars
- County: Marvdasht
- Bakhsh: Central
- Rural District: Naqsh-e Rostam

Population (2016)
  - Total: 1,281
- Time zone: UTC+3:30 (IRST)
  - Summer (DST): UTC+4:30 (IRDT)

Shamsabad-e Borzu (Persian: شمس ابادبرزو, also Romanized as Shamsābād-e Borzū) is a village in Naqsh-e Rostam Rural District, in the Central District of Marvdasht County, Fars province, Iran. At the 2006 census, its population was 1,302, in 322 families.
