= Shamsabad, Mashhad =

Shamsabad شمس اباد
- Village
- Location within Iran
- Coordinates: 36°27′42″N 59°27′40″E
- Country: Iran
- Province: Razavi Khorasan
- County: Mashhad
- Bakhsh: Central
- Rural District: Tus

Population (2006)
  - Total: 184
- Time zone: UTC+3:30 (IRST)
  - Summer (DST): UTC+4:30 (IRDT)

Shamsabad (Persian: شمس اباد, also Romanized as Shamsābād) is a village in Tus Rural District, in the Central District of Mashhad County, Razavi Khorasan province, Iran. At the 2006 census, its population was 184, in 53 families.
