= Borjak, Bardaskan =

Borjak برجك
- Village
- Location within Iran
- Coordinates: 35°19′53″N 57°52′14″E
- Country: Iran
- Province: Razavi Khorasan
- County: Bardaskan
- Bakhsh: Anabad
- Rural District: Sahra

Population (2006)
  - Total: 340
- Time zone: UTC+3:30 (IRST)
  - Summer (DST): UTC+4:30 (IRDT)

Borjak (Persian: برجك) is a village in Sahra Rural District, Anabad District, Bardaskan County, Razavi Khorasan Province, Iran. At the 2006 census, its population was 340, in 118 families.
