= Shamsabad-e Takht =

Shamsabad-e Takht شمس ابادتخت
- Village
- Location within Iran
- Coordinates: 29°54′24″N 52°54′19″E
- Country: Iran
- Province: Fars
- County: Marvdasht
- Bakhsh: Central
- Rural District: Mohammadabad

Population (2006)
  - Total: 699
- Time zone: UTC+3:30 (IRST)
  - Summer (DST): UTC+4:30 (IRDT)

Shamsabad-e Takht (Persian: شمس ابادتخت, also Romanized as Shamsābād-e Takht) is a village in Mohammadabad Rural District, in the Central District of Marvdasht County, Fars province, Iran. At the 2006 census, its population was 699, in 183 families.
