= Shamsabad, Kohgiluyeh and Boyer-Ahmad =

Shamsabad شمس اباد
- Village
- Location within Iran
- Coordinates: 30°40′24″N 50°44′47″E
- Country: Iran
- Province: Kohgiluyeh and Boyer-Ahmad
- County: Charam
- Bakhsh: Central
- Rural District: Charam

Population (2006)
  - Total: 21
- Time zone: UTC+3:30 (IRST)
  - Summer (DST): UTC+4:30 (IRDT)

Shamsabad (Persian: شمس اباد, also Romanized as Shamsābād) is a village in Charam Rural District, in the Central District of Charam County, Kohgiluyeh and Boyer-Ahmad province, Iran. At the 2006 census, its population was 21, in 4 families.
