= Shamsabad, Lorestan =

Shamsabad شمس‌آباد
- Village
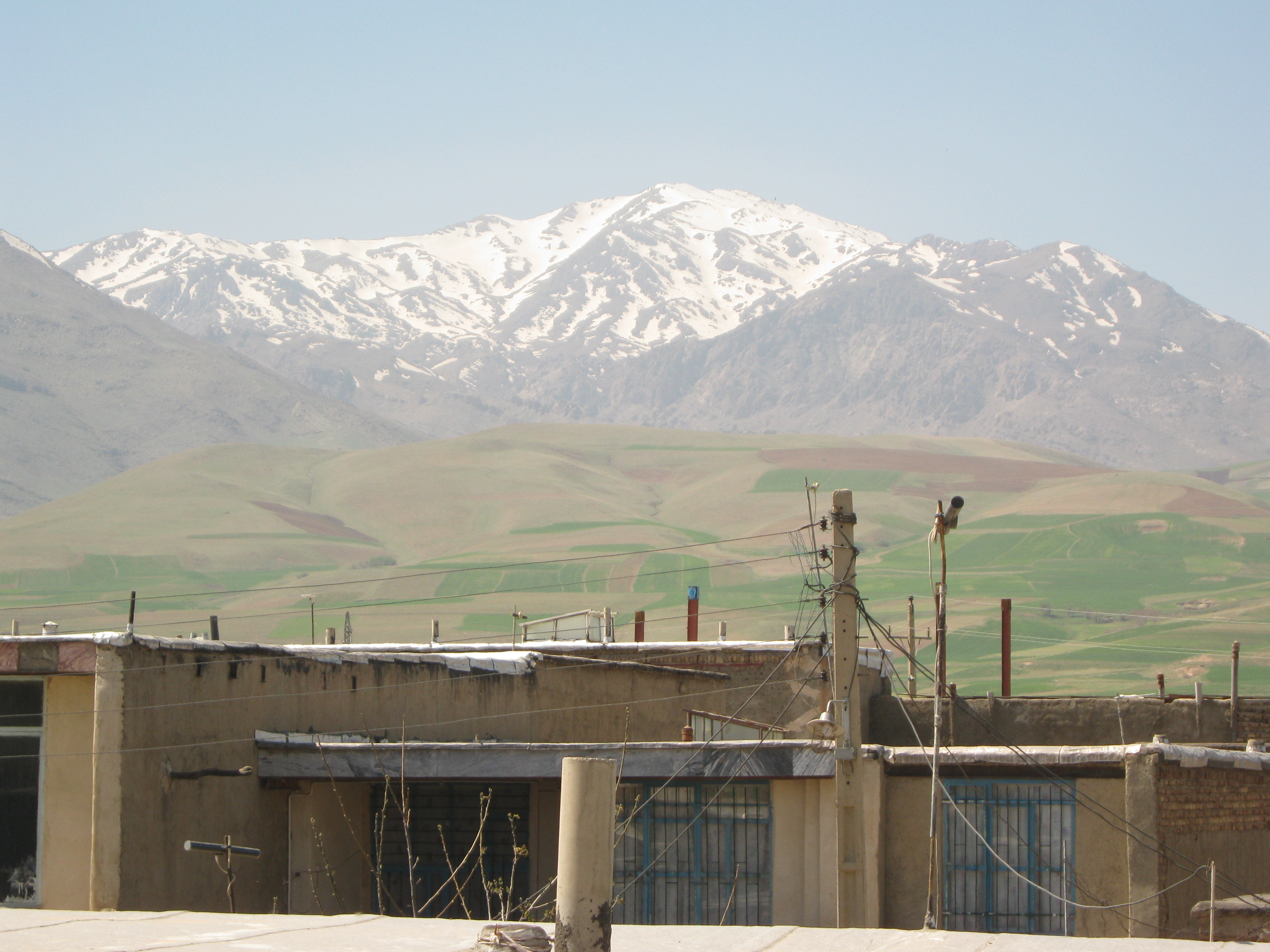

- Location within Iran
- Coordinates: 33°52′42″N 48°43′52″E
- Country: Iran
- Province: Lorestan
- County: Borujerd
- Bakhsh: Central
- Rural District: Hemmatabad

Population (2006)
  - Total: 654
- Time zone: UTC+3:30 (IRST)
  - Summer (DST): UTC+4:30 (IRDT)

Shamsabad (Persian: شمس‌آباد, also Romanized as Shamsābād) is a village in Hemmatabad Rural District, in the Central District of Borujerd County, Lorestan Province, Iran. At the 2006 census, its population was 654, in 143 families.
