= Shamsabad, Rafsanjan =

Shamsabad شمس اباد
- Village
- Location within Iran
- Coordinates: 30°43′26″N 55°54′15″E
- Country: Iran
- Province: Kerman
- County: Rafsanjan
- Bakhsh: Ferdows
- Rural District: Rezvan

Population (2006)
  - Total: 661
- Time zone: UTC+3:30 (IRST)
  - Summer (DST): UTC+4:30 (IRDT)

Shamsabad (Persian: شمس اباد, also Romanized as Shamsābād; also known as Shams Abad Nogh) is a village in Rezvan Rural District, Ferdows District, Rafsanjan County, Kerman province, Iran. At the 2006 census, its population was 661, in 171 families.
