= Shamsabad-e Olya =

Shamsabad-e Olya شمس ابادعليا
- Village
- Location within Iran
- Coordinates: 29°25′27″N 57°50′52″E
- Country: Iran
- Province: Kerman
- County: Bam
- Bakhsh: Central
- Rural District: Howmeh

Population (2006)
  - Total: 40
- Time zone: UTC+3:30 (IRST)
  - Summer (DST): UTC+4:30 (IRDT)

Shamsabad-e Olya (Persian: شمس ابادعليا, also Romanized as Shamsābād-e ‘Olyā; also known as Shamsābād and Shamsīābād) is a village in Howmeh Rural District, in the Central District of Bam County, Kerman province, Iran. At the 2006 census, its population was 40, in 12 families.
