= Nashtarud =

City in Mazandaran province, Iran

Nashtarud Persian: نشتارود
- City
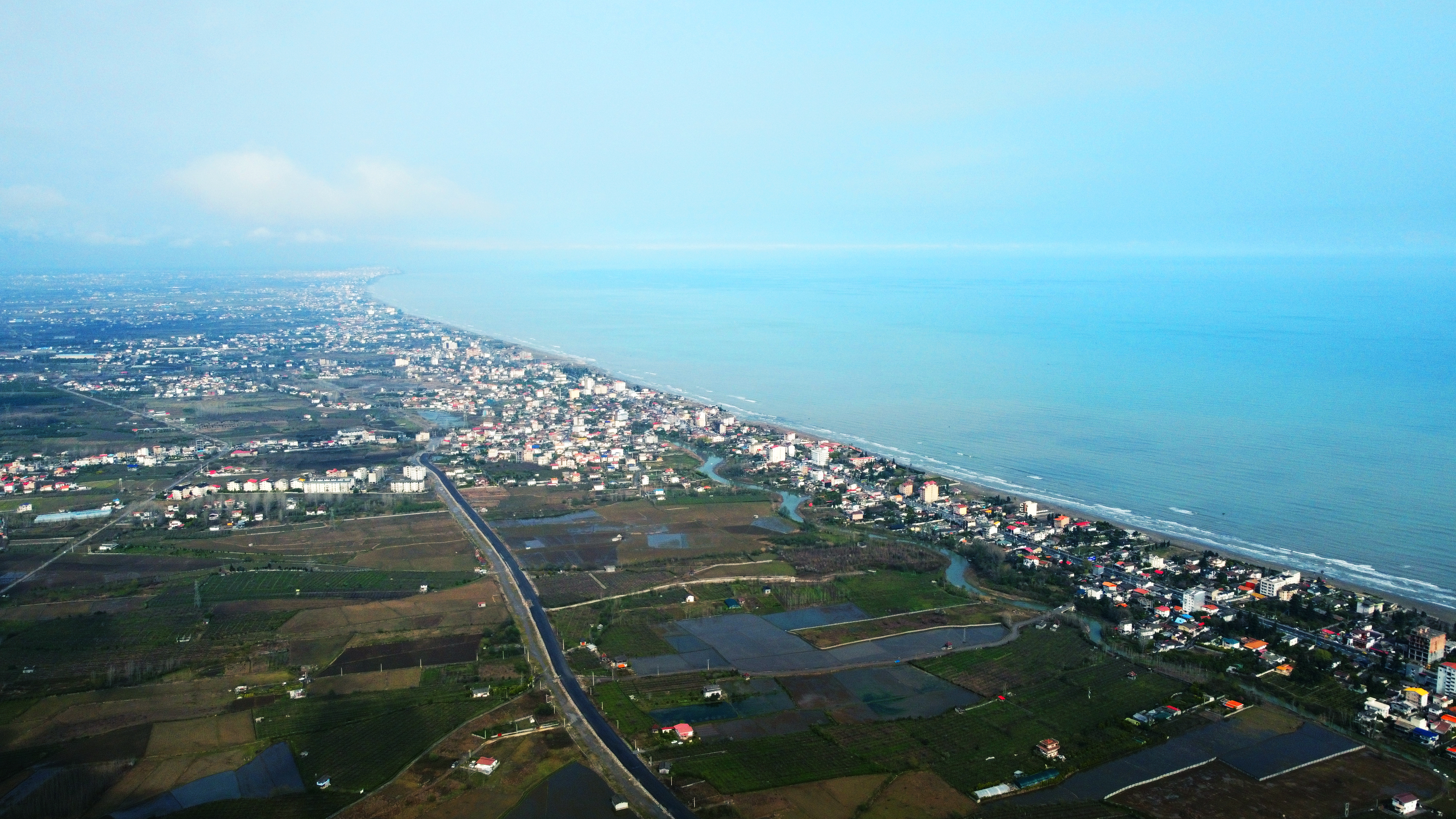
- Shoreline at the city of Nashtarud

- Location within Iran
- Coordinates: 36°44′49″N 51°02′17″E
- Country: Iran
- Province: Mazandaran
- County: Tonekabon
- District: Nashta

Population (2016)
  - Total: 6,394
- Time zone: UTC+3:30 (IRST)

Nashtarud (Persian: نشتارود) (Note: Also romanized as Nashtā Rūd, Nashtarood, Nashtārūd, and Neshtā Rūd) is a city in, and the capital of, Nashta District in Tonekabon County, Mazandaran province, Iran.

== Demographics ==
=== Population ===
At the time of the 2006 National Census, the city's population was 5,837 in 1,710 households. The following census in 2011 counted 5,642 people in 1,616 households. The 2016 census measured the population of the city as 6,394 people in 2,109 households.
