= Chehel Mani, Anbarabad =

Chehel Mani چهل مني
- Village
- Location within Iran
- Coordinates: 28°18′30″N 57°50′19″E
- Country: Iran
- Province: Kerman
- County: Anbarabad
- Bakhsh: Central
- Rural District: Jahadabad

Population (2006)
  - Total: 85
- Time zone: UTC+3:30 (IRST)
  - Summer (DST): UTC+4:30 (IRDT)

Chehel Mani (Persian: چهل مني, also Romanized as Chehel Manī; also known as Chehel Maneh) is a village in Jahadabad Rural District, in the Central District of Anbarabad County, Kerman Province, Iran. At the 2006 census, its population was 85, in 22 families.
