= Shamsabad, Sepidan =

Shamsabad شمس آباد
- Village
- Location within Iran
- Coordinates: 30°00′03″N 52°24′17″E
- Country: Iran
- Province: Fars
- County: Sepidan
- Bakhsh: Beyza
- Rural District: Beyza

Population (2006)
  - Total: 165
- Time zone: UTC+3:30 (IRST)
  - Summer (DST): UTC+4:30 (IRDT)

Shamsabad (Persian: شمس آباد, also Romanized as Shamsābād) is a village in Beyza Rural District, Beyza District, Sepidan County, Fars province, Iran. At the 2006 census, its population was 165, in 43 families.
