= Shamsabad, Birjand =

Shamsabad شمس اباد
- Village
- Location within Iran
- Coordinates: 32°42′19″N 59°29′11″E
- Country: Iran
- Province: South Khorasan
- County: Birjand
- Bakhsh: Central
- Rural District: Baqeran

Population (2006)
  - Total: 189
- Time zone: UTC+3:30 (IRST)
  - Summer (DST): UTC+4:30 (IRDT)

Shamsabad (Persian: شمس اباد, also Romanized as Shamsābād; also known as Samsūlābād, Shams Abad Barakooh, Shamsollāhābād, and Shamsulābād) is a village in Baqeran Rural District, in the Central District of Birjand County, South Khorasan province, Iran. At the 2006 census, its population was 189, in 49 families.
