= Shamsabad, Mazul =

Shamsabad شمس اباد
- Village
- Location within Iran
- Coordinates: 36°14′16″N 58°45′59″E
- Country: Iran
- Province: Razavi Khorasan
- County: Nishapur
- Bakhsh: Central
- Rural District: Mazul

Population (2006)
  - Total: 20
- Time zone: UTC+3:30 (IRST)
  - Summer (DST): UTC+4:30 (IRDT)

Shamsabad (Persian: شمس اباد, also Romanized as Shamsābād) is a village in Mazul Rural District, in the Central District of Nishapur County, Razavi Khorasan province, Iran. At the 2006 census, its population was 20, in 7 families.
