= Shamsabad, Bakhtajerd =

Shamsabad شمس اباد
- Village
- Location within Iran
- Coordinates: 28°43′20″N 54°24′06″E
- Country: Iran
- Province: Fars
- County: Darab
- Bakhsh: Central
- Rural District: Bakhtajerd

Population (2006)
  - Total: 843
- Time zone: UTC+3:30 (IRST)
  - Summer (DST): UTC+4:30 (IRDT)

Shamsabad (Persian: شمس اباد, also Romanized as Shamsābād; also known as Shams Abad Roodbal) is a village in Bakhtajerd Rural District, in the Central District of Darab County, Fars province, Iran. At the 2006 census, its population was 843, in 191 families.
