= Borjak, Markazi =

Borjak برجك
- Village
- Location within Iran
- Coordinates: 33°33′56″N 49°48′52″E
- Country: Iran
- Province: Markazi
- County: Khomeyn
- Bakhsh: Kamareh
- Rural District: Chahar Cheshmeh

Population (2006)
  - Total: 275
- Time zone: UTC+3:30 (IRST)
  - Summer (DST): UTC+4:30 (IRDT)

Borjak (Persian: برجك; also known as Burjak) is a village in Chahar Cheshmeh Rural District, Kamareh District, Khomeyn County, Markazi Province, Iran. At the 2006 census, its population was 275, in 78 families.
