= Shamshabad Assembly constituency =

Constituency of the Madhya Pradesh legislative assembly in India

Coordinates: 22.83°N 76.34°E

Shamshabad
- Constituency No. 148 for the Madhya Pradesh Legislative Assembly

Constituency details
- Country: India
- Region: Central India
- State: Madhya Pradesh
- District: Vidisha
- Lok Sabha constituency: Sagar
- Established: 1977
- Reservation: None

Member of Legislative Assembly
- 16th Madhya Pradesh Legislative Assembly
- Incumbent Surya Prakash Meena
- Party: Bharatiya Janata Party
- Elected year: 2023
- Preceded by: Rajshree Singh

Shamshabad is one of the 230 Vidhan Sabha (Legislative Assembly) constituencies of Madhya Pradesh state in central India. This constituency came into existence in 1977, as one of the Vidhan Sabha constituencies of Madhya Pradesh state. Shamshabad is one of the 5 Vidhan Sabha constituencies located in Vidisha district. This constituency covers the entire Shamshabad tehsil, Nateran tehsil and Vidisha tehsil. Shamshabad is part of Sagar Lok Sabha constituency.

== Members of Legislative Assembly ==
Year	Name	Party
1977	Girischand Ramsahay	Janata Party
1980	Brijmohandas Maheshwari	Bharatiya Janata Party
1985	Mertab Singh	Indian National Congress
1990	Prem Narayan Sharma	Bharatiya Janata Party
1993	Prem Narayan Sharma	Bharatiya Janata Party
1998	Rudrapratap Singh	Ajeya Bharat Party
2003	Raghav Ji	Bharatiya Janata Party
2008	Surya Prakash Meena	Bharatiya Janata Party
2013	Surya Prakash Meena	Bharatiya Janata Party
2018	Rajshree Singh	Bharatiya Janata Party
2023	Surya Prakash Meena	Bharatiya Janata Party

== Election results ==
=== 2023 ===
2023 Madhya Pradesh Legislative Assembly election: Shamshabad
Party	Candidate	Votes	%	±%
BJP	Surya Prakash Meena	87,234	53.74	+6.37
INC	Sindhu Vikram Singh	67,970	41.87	+0.05
NOTA	None of the above	1,069	0.66	−0.68
Majority		19,264	11.87	+6.32
Turnout		162,318	80.92	+5.54
BJP hold		Swing		

=== 2018 ===
2018 Madhya Pradesh Legislative Assembly election: Shamshabad
Party	Candidate	Votes	%	±%
BJP	Rajshree Singh	62,607	47.37	
INC	Jyotsna Yadav	55,267	41.82	
Independent	Narayan Singh Kushwah	6,027	4.56	
BSP	Maharaj Singh Ahirwar	1,995	1.51	
Sapaks Party	Arvind Tiwari	1,393	1.05	
NOTA	None of the above	1,769	1.34	
Majority		7,340	5.55	
Turnout		132,157	75.38	
BJP hold		Swing		

== See also ==
- Vidisha District
- Shamshabad
