= Barjak, Hamadan =

Barjak برجك
- Village
- Location within Iran
- Coordinates: 34°10′27″N 48°28′12″E
- Country: Iran
- Province: Hamadan
- County: Nahavand
- Bakhsh: Central
- Rural District: Shaban

Population (2006)
  - Total: 307
- Time zone: UTC+3:30 (IRST)
  - Summer (DST): UTC+4:30 (IRDT)

Barjak (Persian: برجك, also Romanized as Barjok and Borjak; also known as Bārjūk) is a village in Shaban Rural District, in the Central District of Nahavand County, Hamadan Province, Iran. At the 2006 census, its population was 307, in 69 families.
