= Sorkh Qaleh District =

District in Kerman province, Iran

Sorkh Qaleh District Persian: بخش سرخ قلعه
- District
- Location within Iran
- Coordinates: 27°41′12″N 58°00′01″E
- Country: Iran
- Province: Kerman
- County: Qaleh Ganj
- Capital: Sorkh Qaleh
- Time zone: UTC+3:30 (IRST)

Sorkh Qaleh District (Persian: بخش سرخ قلعه) is in Qaleh Ganj County, Kerman province, Iran. Its capital is the village of Sorkh Qaleh, whose population at the time of the 2016 National Census was 776 people in 223 households.

== History ==
After the 2016 census, Sorkh Qaleh Rural District was separated from the Central District in the formation of Sorkh Qaleh District.

== Demographics ==
=== Administrative divisions ===
Sorkh Qaleh District
Administrative Divisions
Chehel Mani RD
Sorkh Qaleh RD
RD = Rural District
