= Shamsabad, Kerman =

Shamsabad شمس اباد
- Village
- Location within Iran
- Coordinates: 30°21′05″N 56°46′43″E
- Country: Iran
- Province: Kerman
- County: Kerman
- Bakhsh: Central
- Rural District: Ekhtiarabad

Population (2006)
  - Total: 55
- Time zone: UTC+3:30 (IRST)

Shamsabad (Persian: شمس اباد, also Romanized as Shamsābād) is a village in Ekhtiarabad Rural District, in the Central District of Kerman County, Kerman Province, Iran. At the 2006 census, its population was 55, in 18 families.
