= Shamshabad, Madhya Pradesh =

City in Madhya Pradesh, India

शम्शाबाद Shamshabad
- City
- Location within Madhya Pradesh Location within India
- Coordinates: 23.81°N 77.49°E
- Country: India
- State: Madhya Pradesh
- District: Vidisha
- Elevation: 424 m (1,391 ft)

Population (2011)
  - Total: 11,329

Languages
  - Official: Hindi
- Vehicle registration: MP-40
- Website: vidisha.nic.in

Shamshabad is a Nagar Panchayat city in the district of Vidisha, Madhya Pradesh. It's also a tehsil headquarter. It belongs to the Bhopal Division.

== Geography ==
Shamshabad is located at 23.81°N 77.49°E in the Vidisha District.

== Demographics ==
The Shamshabad Nagar Panchayat has a population of 9,373, of which 4,946 are males and 4,427 are females, as per a report released by Census of India.

== Government ==
Shamshabad is part of the Shamshabad Assembly constituency.

=== Civil Administration ===
The city of Shamshabad is divided into 15 wards, for which elections are held every five years. Shamshabad Nagar Panchayat has total administration over 2,270 houses, to which it supplies basic amenities like water and sewerage. It is also authorized to build roads within the Nagar Panchayat limits and impose taxes on properties coming under its jurisdiction.

== See also ==
- Vidisha District
- Shamshabad Assembly constituency
