= Katra Rural District =

Rural district in Mazandaran province, Iran

Katra Rural District Persian: دهستان كترا
- Rural District
- Location within Iran
- Coordinates: 36°38′N 50°59′E
- Country: Iran
- Province: Mazandaran
- County: Tonekabon
- District: Nashta
- Established: 1987
- Capital: Katra

Population (2016)
  - Total: 8,147
- Time zone: UTC+3:30 (IRST)

Katra Rural District (Persian: دهستان كترا) (Note: Formerly Nashtarud Rural District (دهستان نشتارود)) is in Nashta District of Tonekabon County, Mazandaran province, Iran. Its capital is the village of Katra.

== Demographics ==
=== Population ===
At the time of the 2006 National Census, the rural district's population was 8,032 in 2,278 households. There were 8,140 inhabitants in 2,629 households at the following census of 2011. The 2016 census measured the population of the rural district as 8,147 in 2,854 households. The most populous of its 46 villages was Katra, with 1,832 people.

=== Other villages in the rural district ===
- Alkaleh
- Mazubon-e Olya
- Palat Kaleh
- Rud-e Posht
- Talesh Mahalleh
- Tilpordehsar
- Zavar
