= Tameshkol Rural District =

Rural district in Mazandaran province, Iran

Tameshkol Rural District Persian: دهستان تمشكل
- Rural District
- Location within Iran
- Coordinates: 36°42′N 51°02′E
- Country: Iran
- Province: Mazandaran
- County: Tonekabon
- District: Nashta
- Established: 2003
- Capital: Tameshkol

Population (2016)
  - Total: 11,394
- Time zone: UTC+3:30 (IRST)

Tameshkol Rural District (Persian: دهستان تمشكل) is in Nashta District of Tonekabon County, Mazandaran province, Iran. Its capital is the village of Tameshkol.

== Demographics ==
=== Population ===
At the time of the 2006 National Census, the rural district's population was 10,714 in 2,879 households. There were 10,948 inhabitants in 3,277 households at the following census of 2011. The 2016 census measured the population of the rural district as 11,394 in 3,755 households. The most populous of its 25 villages was Tubon, with 1,146 people.

=== Other villages in the rural district ===
- Dinar Sara
- Faqihabad
- Kazemabad
- Khoshk Bur
- Moallem Kuh
- Pol Sara
- Rudgar Mahalleh
- Sarfaqihabad
