= Qaleh Ganj Rural District =

Rural district in Kerman province, Iran

Qaleh Ganj Rural District Persian: دهستان قلعه گنج
- Rural District
- Location within Iran
- Coordinates: 27°26′19″N 57°54′13″E
- Country: Iran
- Province: Kerman
- County: Qaleh Ganj
- District: Central
- Capital: Shamsabad

Population (2016)
  - Total: 15,997
- Time zone: UTC+3:30 (IRST)

Qaleh Ganj Rural District (Persian: دهستان قلعه گنج) is in the Central District of Qaleh Ganj County, Kerman province, Iran. Its capital is the village of Shamsabad. The rural district was previously administered from the city of Qaleh Ganj.

== Demographics ==
=== Population ===
At the time of the 2006 National Census, the rural district's population was 13,947 in 2,875 households. There were 16,070 inhabitants in 4,081 households at the following census of 2011. The 2016 census measured the population of the rural district as 15,997 in 4,545 households. The most populous of its 62 villages was Dulab, with 1,253 people.
