= Sorkh Qaleh Rural District =

Rural district in Kerman province, Iran

Sorkh Qaleh Rural District Persian: دهستان سرخ قلعه
- Rural District
- Location within Iran
- Coordinates: 27°47′29″N 57°56′33″E
- Country: Iran
- Province: Kerman
- County: Qaleh Ganj
- District: Sorkh Qaleh
- Capital: Sorkh Qaleh

Population (2016)
  - Total: 21,789
- Time zone: UTC+3:30 (IRST)

Sorkh Qaleh Rural District (Persian: دهستان سرخ قلعه) is in Sorkh Qaleh District of Qaleh Ganj County, Kerman province, Iran. Its capital is the village of Sorkh Qaleh.

== Demographics ==
=== Population ===
At the time of the 2006 National Census, the rural district's population (as a part of the Central District) was 19,860 in 4,220 households. There were 21,171 inhabitants in 5,319 households at the following census of 2011. The 2016 census measured the population of the rural district as 21,789 in 5,819 households. The most populous of its 69 villages was Ahugan, with 1,219 people.

After the census, the rural district was separated from the district in the formation of Sorkh Qaleh District.
