= Nashta District =

District in Mazandaran province, Iran

Nashta District Persian: بخش نشتا
- District
- Location within Iran
- Coordinates: 36°38′N 50°59′E
- Country: Iran
- Province: Mazandaran
- County: Tonekabon
- Established: 2003
- Capital: Nashtarud

Population (2016)
  - Total: 25,935
- Time zone: UTC+3:30 (IRST)

Nashta District (Persian: بخش نشتا) is in Tonekabon County, Mazandaran province, Iran. Its capital is the city of Nashtarud.

== Demographics ==
=== Population ===
At the time of the 2006 National Census, the district's population was 24,583 in 6,867 households. The following census in 2011 counted 24,730 people in 7,522 households. The 2016 census measured the population of the district as 25,935 inhabitants in 8,716 households.

=== Administrative divisions ===
Nashta District Population
Administrative Divisions	2006	2011	2016
Katra RD (Note: Formerly Nashtarud Rural District)	8,032	8,140	8,147
Tameshkol RD	10,714	10,948	11,394
Nashtarud (city)	5,837	5,642	6,394
Total	24,583	24,730	25,935
RD = Rural District
