= Central District (Qaleh Ganj County) =

District in Kerman province, Iran

Central District (Qaleh Ganj County) Persian: بخش مرکزی شهرستان قلعه گنج
- District
- Location within Iran
- Coordinates: 27°34′55″N 57°59′46″E
- Country: Iran
- Province: Kerman
- County: Qaleh Ganj
- Capital: Qaleh Ganj

Population (2016)
  - Total: 50,955
- Time zone: UTC+3:30 (IRST)

The Central District of Qaleh Ganj County (Persian: بخش مرکزی شهرستان قلعه گنج) is in Kerman province, Iran. Its capital is the city of Qaleh Ganj.

== History ==
After the 2016 National Census, Dulab Rural District was created in the district, and Sorkh Qaleh Rural District was separated from it in the formation of Sorkh Qaleh District.

== Demographics ==
=== Population ===
At the time of the 2006 census, the district's population was 45,367 in 9,538 households. The following census in 2011 counted 49,904 people in 12,434 households. The 2016 census measured the population of the district as 50,955 inhabitants in 14,002 households.

=== Administrative divisions ===
Central District (Qaleh Ganj County) Population
Administrative Divisions	2006	2011	2016
Dulab RD (Note: Established after the 2016 census)			
Qaleh Ganj RD	13,947	16,070	15,997
Sorkh Qaleh RD (Note: Transferred to Sorkh Qaleh District after the 2016 census)	19,860	21,171	21,789
Qaleh Ganj (city)	11,560	12,663	13,169
Total	45,367	49,904	50,955
RD = Rural District
