= Bozorg Bisheh-ye Mahalleh =

Village in Mazandaran province, Iran

Bozorg Bisheh-ye Mahalleh Persian: بزرگ بيشه محله
- Village
- Location within Iran
- Coordinates: 36°36′40″N 52°30′19″E
- Country: Iran
- Province: Mazandaran
- County: Fereydunkenar
- District: Central
- Rural District: Barik Rud-e Jonubi

Population (2016)
  - Total: 1,075
- Time zone: UTC+3:30 (IRST)

Bozorg Bisheh-ye Mahalleh (Persian: بزرگ بيشه محله) (Note: Also romanized as Bozorg Bīsheh-ye Maḩalleh; also known as Bozorg Bīsheh) is a village in Barik Rud-e Jonubi Rural District of the Central District in Fereydunkenar County, Mazandaran province, Iran.

== Demographics ==
=== Population ===
At the time of the 2006 National Census, the village's population was 1,292 in 294 households, when it was in Emamzadeh Abdollah Rural District (Note: Renamed Emamzadeh Abdollah-ye Jonubi Rural District) of the former Fereydunkenar District in Babolsar County. The following census in 2011 counted 1,201 people in 324 households, by which time the district had been separated from the county in the establishment of Fereydunkenar County. The rural district was transferred to the new Dehferi District and renamed Emamzadeh Abdollah-ye Jonubi Rural District. Bozorg Bisheh-ye Mahalleh was transferred to Barik Rud-e Jonubi Rural District created in the new Central District. The 2016 census measured the population of the village as 1,075 people in 361 households, the most populous in its rural district.
