= Jazin, Mazandaran =

Village in Mazandaran province, Iran

Jazin Persian: جزين
- Village
- Location within Iran
- Coordinates: 36°36′06″N 52°31′45″E
- Country: Iran
- Province: Mazandaran
- County: Fereydunkenar
- District: Central
- Rural District: Barik Rud-e Jonubi

Population (2016)
  - Total: 451
- Time zone: UTC+3:30 (IRST)

Jazin (Persian: جزين) (Note: Also romanized as Jezin, Jezīn and Jozīn) is a village in Barik Rud-e Jonubi Rural District of the Central District in Fereydunkenar County, Mazandaran province, Iran.

== Demographics ==
=== Population ===
At the time of the 2006 National Census, the village's population was 422 in 112 households, when it was in Emamzadeh Abdollah Rural District (Note: Renamed Emamzadeh Abdollah-ye Jonubi Rural District) of the former Fereydunkenar District in Babolsar County. The following census in 2011 counted 442 people in 128 households, by which time the district had been separated from the county in the establishment of Fereydunkenar County. The rural district was transferred to the new Dehferi District and renamed Emamzadeh Abdollah-ye Jonubi Rural District. Jazin was transferred to Barik Rud-e Jonubi Rural District created in the new Central District. The 2016 census measured the population of the village as 451 people in 156 households.
