= Owksar-e Karim Kola =

Village in Mazandaran province, Iran

Owksar-e Karim Kola Persian: اوكسركريم كلا
- Village
- Location within Iran
- Coordinates: 36°36′10″N 52°32′32″E
- Country: Iran
- Province: Mazandaran
- County: Fereydunkenar
- District: Central
- Rural District: Barik Rud-e Jonubi

Population (2016)
  - Total: 446
- Time zone: UTC+3:30 (IRST)

Owksar-e Karim Kola (Persian: اوكسركريم كلا) (Note: Also romanized as Owksar-e Karīm Kolā; also known as Owksar) is a village in Barik Rud-e Jonubi Rural District of the Central District in Fereydunkenar County, Mazandaran province, Iran.

== Demographics ==
=== Population ===
At the time of the 2006 National Census, the village's population was 329 in 88 households, when it was in Emamzadeh Abdollah Rural District (Note: Renamed Emamzadeh Abdollah-ye Jonubi Rural District) of the former Fereydunkenar District in Babolsar County. The following census in 2011 counted 441 people in 145 households, by which time the district had been separated from the county in the establishment of Fereydunkenar County. The rural district was transferred to the new Dehferi District and renamed Emamzadeh Abdollah-ye Jonubi Rural District. Owksar-e Karim Kola was transferred to Barik Rud-e Jonubi Rural District created in the new Central District. The 2016 census measured the population of the village as 446 people in 157 households.
