= Shahrak-e Farzadshahr =

Village in Mazandaran province, Iran

Shahrak-e Farzadshahr Persian: شهرك فرزادشهر
- Private Township
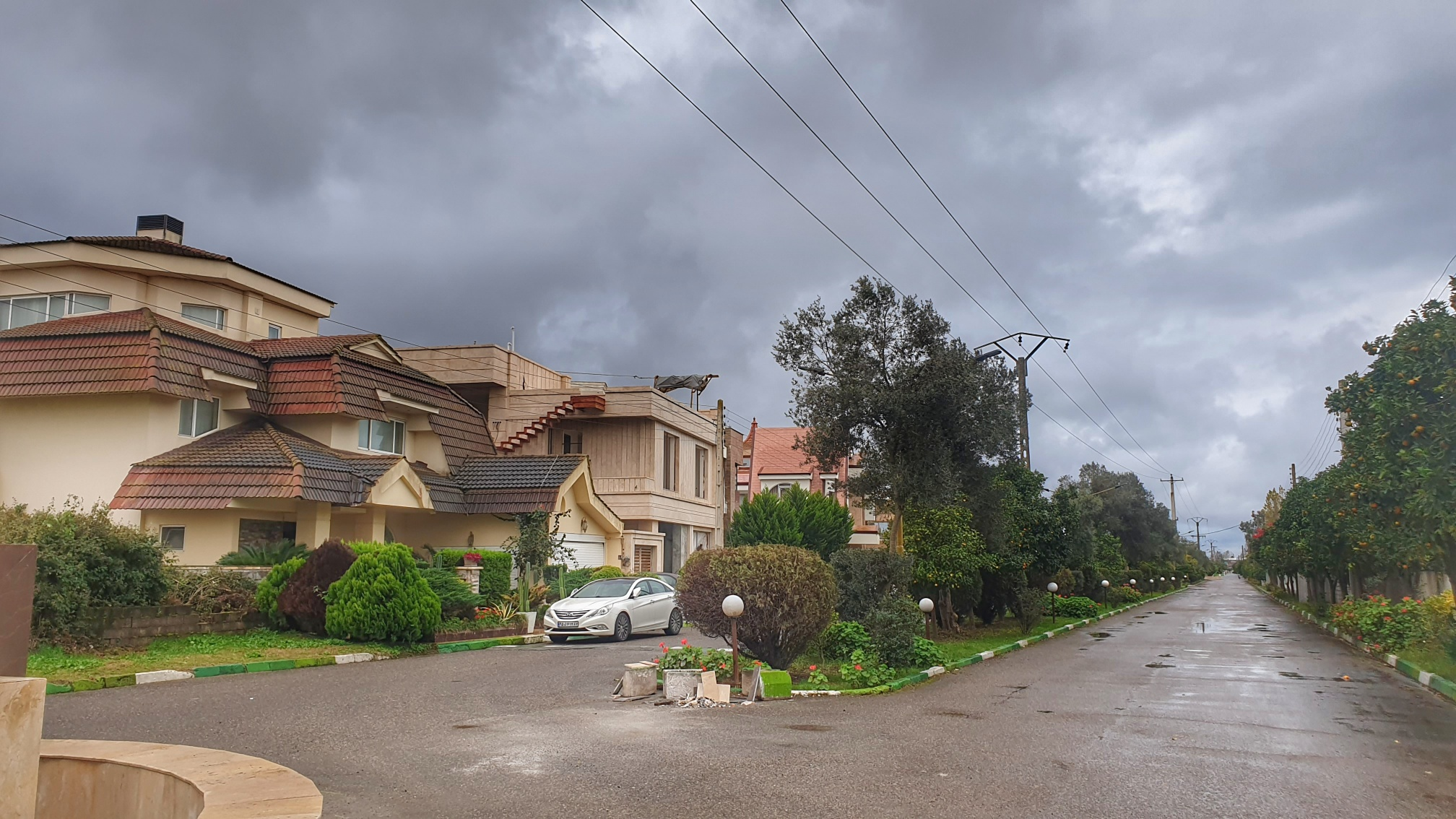

- Location within Iran
- Coordinates: 36°40′36″N 52°29′04″E
- Country: Iran
- Province: Mazandaran
- County: Fereydunkenar
- District: Dehferi
- Rural District: Emamzadeh Abdollah-ye Shomali

Population (2016)
  - Total: 444
- Time zone: UTC+3:30 (IRST)

Shahrak-e Farzadshahr (Persian: شهرک فرزادشهر) (Note: Also romanized as Shahrak-e Farzādshahr) is a private township in Emamzadeh Abdollah-ye Shomali Rural District of Dehferi District in Fereydunkenar County, Mazandaran province, Iran. It is east of the city of Fereydunkenar, near Road 22, a short distance from the Caspian Sea. Shahrak-e Farzadshahr is the first private township to be registered in the province.

== Demographics ==
=== Population ===
At the time of the 2006 National Census, the village's population was 481 in 133 households, when it was in Emamzadeh Abdollah Rural District (Note: Renamed Emamzadeh Abdollah-ye Jonubi Rural District) of the former Fereydunkenar District in Babolsar County. The following census in 2011 counted 538 people in 161 households, by which time the district had been separated from the county in the establishment of Fereydunkenar County. The rural district was transferred to the new Dehferi District and renamed Emamzadeh Abdollah-ye Jonubi Rural District. Shahrak-e Farzadshahr was transferred to Emamzadeh Abdollah-ye Shomali Rural District created in the same district. The 2016 census measured the population of the village as 444 people in 134 households.
