= Bi Namad =

Village in Mazandaran province, Iran

Bi Namad Persian: بي نمد
- Village
- Location within Iran
- Coordinates: 36°35′40″N 52°30′56″E
- Country: Iran
- Province: Mazandaran
- County: Fereydunkenar
- District: Central
- Rural District: Barik Rud-e Jonubi

Population (2016)
  - Total: 596
- Time zone: UTC+3:30 (IRST)

Bi Namad (Persian: بي نمد) (Note: Also romanized as Bī Namad and Bīnamad) is a village in, and the capital of, Barik Rud-e Jonubi Rural District in the Central District of Fereydunkenar County, Mazandaran province, Iran.

== Demographics ==
=== Population ===
At the time of the 2006 National Census, the village's population was 593 in 164 households, when it was in Emamzadeh Abdollah Rural District (Note: Renamed Emamzadeh Abdollah-ye Jonubi Rural District) of the former Fereydunkenar District in Babolsar County. The following census in 2011 counted 635 people in 202 households, by which time the district had been separated from the county in the establishment of Fereydunkenar County. The rural district was transferred to the new Dehferi District and renamed Emamzadeh Abdollah-ye Jonubi Rural District. Bi Namad was transferred to Barik Rud-e Jonubi Rural District created in the new Central District. The 2016 census measured the population of the village as 596 people in 210 households.
