= Fulad Kola, Babolsar =

Village in Mazandaran province, Iran

Fulad Kola Persian: فولادكلا
- Village
- Location within Iran
- Coordinates: 36°36′10″N 52°38′01″E
- Country: Iran
- Province: Mazandaran
- County: Babolsar
- District: Rudbast
- Rural District: Pazevar

Population (2016)
  - Total: 2,095
- Time zone: UTC+3:30 (IRST)

Fulad Kola (Persian: فولادكلا) (Note: Also romanized as Fūlād Kolā; also known as Fū Kalā and Fū Kolā) is a village in Pazevar Rural District of Rudbast District in Babolsar County, Mazandaran province, Iran.

It is divided from Amirkola city by Babolrud river in east. Its nearby villages are Seyyed Mahalleh to its northwest, Sar Hammam and Aysi Kola to its northeast, Reza Kola to its north, and Rekun to its southwest.

== Demographics ==
=== Population ===
At the time of the 2006 National Census, the village's population was 1,982 in 524 households. The following census in 2011 counted 2,129 people in 633 households. The 2016 census measured the population of the village as 2,095 people in 677 households. It was the most populous village in its rural district.
