= Tuleh Sara =

Village in Mazandaran province, Iran

Tuleh Sara Persian: توله سرا
- Village
- Location within Iran
- Coordinates: 36°35′48″N 52°31′07″E
- Country: Iran
- Province: Mazandaran
- County: Fereydunkenar
- District: Central
- Rural District: Barik Rud-e Jonubi

Population (2016)
  - Total: 364
- Time zone: UTC+3:30 (IRST)

Tuleh Sara (Persian: توله سرا) (Note: Also romanized as Ţūleh Sarā; also known as Ţūl Sarā) is a village in Barik Rud-e Jonubi Rural District of the Central District in Fereydunkenar County, Mazandaran province, Iran.

== Demographics ==
=== Population ===
At the time of the 2006 National Census, the village's population was 294 in 74 households, when it was in Emamzadeh Abdollah Rural District (Note: Renamed Emamzadeh Abdollah-ye Jonubi Rural District) of the former Fereydunkenar District in Babolsar County. The following census in 2011 counted 310 people in 98 households, by which time the district had been separated from the county in the establishment of Fereydunkenar County. The rural district was transferred to the new Dehferi District and renamed Emamzadeh Abdollah-ye Jonubi Rural District. Tuleh Sara was transferred to Barik Rud-e Jonubi Rural District created in the new Central District. The 2016 census measured the population of the village as 364 people in 124 households.
