= Monqar Pey =

Village in Mazandaran province, Iran

Monqar Pey Persian: منقارپي
- Village
- Location within Iran
- Coordinates: 36°36′44″N 52°31′01″E
- Country: Iran
- Province: Mazandaran
- County: Fereydunkenar
- District: Central
- Rural District: Barik Rud-e Jonubi

Population (2016)
  - Total: 372
- Time zone: UTC+3:30 (IRST)

Monqar Pey (Persian: منقارپي) (Note: Also romanized as Monqār Pey) is a village in Barik Rud-e Jonubi Rural District of the Central District in Fereydunkenar County, Mazandaran province, Iran.

== Demographics ==
=== Population ===
At the time of the 2006 National Census, the village's population was 453 in 115 households, when it was in Emamzadeh Abdollah Rural District (Note: Renamed Emamzadeh Abdollah-ye Jonubi Rural District) of the former Fereydunkenar District in Babolsar County. The following census in 2011 counted 420 people in 119 households, by which time the district had been separated from the county in the establishment of Fereydunkenar County. The rural district was transferred to the new Dehferi District and renamed Emamzadeh Abdollah-ye Jonubi Rural District. Monqar Pey was transferred to Barik Rud-e Jonubi Rural District created in the new Central District. The 2016 census measured the population of the village as 372 people in 119 households.
