= Khoshk Rud =

Khoshk Rud or Khoshk-e Rud (Persian: خشك رود) or Khoshkrud or Khoshkerud (Persian: خشكرود) may refer to:

- Khoshk Rud, Ardabil
- Khoshk Rud, Gilan
- Khoshk Rud, Isfahan
- Khoshk Rud, Kerman
- Khoshk Rud, Lorestan
- Khoshkrud, Markazi
- Khoshk Rud, Amol, Mazandaran province
- Khoshk Rud, Babolsar, Mazandaran province
- Khoshkrud, Tonekabon, Mazandaran province
- Khoshkrud, Khorramabad, Tonekabon County, Mazandaran province
- Khoshkrud, Zanjan
- Khoshk Rud Rural District (Zarandieh County), Markazi province
- Khoshk Rud Rural District (Babolsar County), Mazandaran province

== See also ==
- Khoshkeh Rud (disambiguation)
