= Reza Kola =

Reza Kola رضاكلا
- Village
- Location within Iran
- Coordinates: 36°36′26″N 52°37′59″E
- Country: Iran
- Province: Mazandaran
- County: Babolsar
- Bakhsh: Rudbast
- Rural District: Pazevar

Population (2016)
  - Total: 173
- Time zone: UTC+3:30 (IRST)

Reza Kola (Persian: رضاكلا, also Romanized as Reẕā Kolā) is a village in Pazevar Rural District, Rudbast District, Babolsar County, Mazandaran Province, Iran. It is northwest of Amirkola city and west of Babolrud river. Nearby villages are Fulad Kola to its south, Aysi Kola and Chupan Kola to its northeast, Bala Naqib Kola to its north and Seyyed Mahalleh to its northeast.

At the time of the 2006 National Census, the village's population was 180 in 47 households. The following census in 2011 counted 173 people in 51 households. The 2016 census measured the population of the village as 173 people in 61 households.
