= Shahrak-e Darya Sar =

Village in Mazandaran province, Iran

Shahrak-e Darya Sar Persian: شهرك درياسر
- Village/Private Township
- Location within Iran
- Coordinates: 36°41′23″N 52°34′40″E
- Country: Iran
- Province: Mazandaran
- County: Fereydunkenar
- District: Central
- Rural District: Barik Rud-e Shomali

Population (2016)
  - Total: 46
- Time zone: UTC+3:30 (IRST)

Shahrak-e Darya Sar (Persian: شهرك درياسر) (Note: Also romanized as Shahrak-e Daryā Sar; also known as Daryā Sar) is a village and private township in Barik Rud-e Shomali Rural District (Note: Formerly Barik Rud Rural District) of the Central District in Fereydunkenar County, Mazandaran province, Iran. It is connected to Fereydunkenar to the west, Babolsar and the township of Darya Kenar to the east, and borders Mojtame-ye Meskuni Khazar Shahr.

== Demographics ==
=== Population ===
At the time of the 2006 National Census, the village's population was 61 in 20 households, when it was in Barik Rud Rural District (Note: Renamed Barik Rud-e Shomali Rural District) of the former Fereydunkenar District in Babolsar County. The following census in 2011 counted 22 people in nine households, by which time the district had been separated from the county in the establishment of Fereydunkenar County. The rural district was transferred to the new Central District and renamed Barik Rud-e Shomali Rural District. The 2016 census measured the population of the village as 46 people in 17 households.
