= Boneh Kenar =

Village in Mazandaran province, Iran

Boneh Kenar Persian: بنه كنار
- Village
- Location within Iran
- Coordinates: 36°39′06″N 52°30′13″E
- Country: Iran
- Province: Mazandaran
- County: Fereydunkenar
- District: Dehferi
- Rural District: Emamzadeh Abdollah-ye Shomali

Population (2016)
  - Total: 1,305
- Time zone: UTC+3:30 (IRST)

Boneh Kenar (Persian: بنه كنار) (Note: Also romanized as Boneh Kenār) is a village in Emamzadeh Abdollah-ye Shomali Rural District of Dehferi District in Fereydunkenar County, Mazandaran province, Iran.

== Demographics ==
=== Population ===
At the time of the 2006 National Census, the village's population was 1,233 in 336 households, when it was in Emamzadeh Abdollah Rural District (Note: Renamed Emamzadeh Abdollah-ye Jonubi Rural District) of the former Fereydunkenar District in Babolsar County. The following census in 2011 counted 1,277 people in 388 households, by which time the district had been separated from the county in the establishment of Fereydunkenar County. The rural district was transferred to the new Dehferi District and renamed Emamzadeh Abdollah-ye Jonubi Rural District. Boneh Kenar was transferred to Emamzadeh Abdollah-ye Shomali Rural District created in the same district. The 2016 census measured the population of the village as 1,305 people in 437 households.
