= Ezbaran =

Village in Mazandaran province, Iran

Ezbaran Persian: ازباران
- Village
- Location within Iran
- Coordinates: 36°38′59″N 52°29′26″E
- Country: Iran
- Province: Mazandaran
- County: Fereydunkenar
- District: Dehferi
- Rural District: Emamzadeh Abdollah-ye Shomali

Population (2016)
  - Total: 2,719
- Time zone: UTC+3:30 (IRST)

Ezbaran (Persian: ازباران) (Note: Also romanized as Ezbārān) is a village in, and the capital of, Emamzadeh Abdollah-ye Shomali Rural District in Dehferi District of Fereydunkenar County, Mazandaran province, Iran.

== Demographics ==
=== Population ===
At the time of the 2006 National Census, the village's population was 2,339 in 647 households, when it was in Emamzadeh Abdollah Rural District (Note: Renamed Emamzadeh Abdollah-ye Jonubi Rural District) of the former Fereydunkenar District in Babolsar County. The following census in 2011 counted 2,598 people in 827 households, by which time the district had been separated from the county in the establishment of Fereydunkenar County. The rural district was transferred to the new Dehferi District and renamed Emamzadeh Abdollah-ye Jonubi Rural District. Ezbaran was transferred to Emamzadeh Abdollah-ye Shomali Rural District created in the same district. The 2016 census measured the population of the village as 2,719 people in 937 households. It was the most populous village in its rural district.
