= Kalleh =

Kalleh (Persian: كله) may refer to:

- Kalleh, Isfahan, Iran
- Kalleh-ye Yari, Khuzestan Province, Iran
- Kalleh, Lorestan, Iran
- Kalleh, Markazi, Iran
- Kalleh Bast, city in Mazandaran Province, Iran
- Kaleh Mazandaran VC, former Iranian volleyball club
- Kalleh Dairy, an Iranian dairy, food and drink company

== See also ==
- Kaleh (disambiguation)
