= Kuchek Bisheh-ye Mahalleh =

Village in Mazandaran province, Iran

Kuchek Bisheh-ye Mahalleh Persian: كوچك بيشه محله
- Village
- Location within Iran
- Coordinates: 36°36′39″N 52°29′39″E
- Country: Iran
- Province: Mazandaran
- County: Fereydunkenar
- District: Dehferi
- Rural District: Emamzadeh Abdollah-ye Jonubi

Population (2016)
  - Total: 931
- Time zone: UTC+3:30 (IRST)

Kuchek Bisheh-ye Mahalleh (Persian: كوچك بيشه محله) (Note: Also romanized as Kūchek Bīsheh Maḩalleh; also known as Bīsheh Maḩalleh-ye Kūchak) is a village in, and the capital of, Emamzadeh Abdollah-ye Jonubi Rural District (Note: Formerly Emamzadeh Abdollah Rural District) in Dehferi District of Fereydunkenar County, Mazandaran province, Iran. The previous capital of the rural district was the village of Kardegar Mahalleh, now a neighborhood in the city of Astaneh-ye Sara.

== Demographics ==
=== Population ===
At the time of the 2006 National Census, the village's population was 939 in 239 households, when it was in Emamzadeh Abdollah Rural District (Note: Renamed Emamzadeh Abdollah-ye Jonubi Rural District) of the former Fereydunkenar District in Babolsar County. The following census in 2011 counted 893 people in 274 households, by which time the district had been separated from the county in the establishment of Fereydunkenar County. The rural district was transferred to the new Dehferi District and renamed Emamzadeh Abdollah-ye Jonubi Rural District. The 2016 census measured the population of the village as 931 people in 325 households.
