= Khoshkeh Rud =

Khoshkeh Rud or Khoshkeh Rood (Persian: خشكه رود) may refer to:

- Khoshkeh Rud, Ardabil
- Khoshkeh Rud, Isfahan
- Khoshkeh Rud, Kerman
- Khoshkeh Rud, Lorestan
- Khoshkeh Rud, Markazi
- Khoshkeh Rud, Mazandaran
- Pain Khoshkeh Rud, Mazandaran Province
- Khoshkeh Rud, Zanjan

== See also ==
- Khoshk Rud (disambiguation)
