= Sar Hammam =

Village in Mazandaran province, Iran

Sar Hammam Persian: سرحمام
- Village
- Location within Iran
- Coordinates: 36°36′44″N 52°38′50″E
- Country: Iran
- Province: Mazandaran
- County: Babolsar
- District: Rudbast
- Rural District: Pazevar

Population (2016)
  - Total: 1,580
- Time zone: UTC+3:30 (IRST)

Sar Hammam (Persian: سرحمام) (Note: Also romanized as Sar Ḩammām; also known as Sar Hammām-e Pāzevār) is a village in Pazevar Rural District of Rudbast District in Babolsar County, Mazandaran province, Iran.

It is a northern suburb of Amirkola city. Nearby villages are Sepah Mahalleh and Said Kola to its east, Aysi Kola to its west, Darzi Naqib Kola to its northwest, and Kasegar Mahalleh to its north.

== Demographics ==
=== Population ===
At the time of the 2006 National Census, the village's population was 1,453 in 385 households. The following census in 2011 counted 1,636 people in 481 households. The 2016 census measured the population of the village as 1,580 people in 530 households.
