= Shir Mahalleh, Fereydunkenar =

Neighborhood in Mazandaran province, Iran

Shir Mahalleh Persian: شيرمحله
- Neighborhood
- Location within Iran
- Coordinates: 36°37′48″N 52°29′58″E
- Country: Iran
- Province: Mazandaran
- County: Fereydunkenar
- District: Dehferi
- City: Astaneh-ye Sara

Population (2016)
  - Total: 2,073
- Time zone: UTC+3:30 (IRST)

Shir Mahalleh (Persian: شيرمحله) (Note: Also romanized as Shīr Maḩalleh) is a neighborhood in the city of Astaneh-ye Sara in Dehferi District of Fereydunkenar County, Mazandaran province, Iran.

== Demographics ==
=== Population ===
At the time of the 2006 National Census, Shir Mahalleh's population was 2,024 in 557 households, when it was a village in Emamzadeh Abdollah Rural District (Note: Renamed Emamzadeh Abdollah-ye Jonubi Rural District) of the former Fereydunkenar District in Babolsar County. The following census in 2011 counted 2,033 people in 640 households, by which time the district had been separated from the county in the establishment of Fereydunkenar County. The rural district was transferred to the new Dehferi District and renamed Emamzadeh Abdollah-ye Jonubi Rural District. The 2016 census measured the population of the village as 2,073 people in 706 households.

In 2021, Shir Mahalleh merged with the village of Kardegar Mahalleh in the formation of the village of Astaneh-ye Sara. The village became a city in 2022.
