= Bala Naqib Kola =

Bala Naqib Kola بالانقيب كلا
- Village
- Location within Iran
- Coordinates: 36°36′45″N 52°37′46″E
- Country: Iran
- Province: Mazandaran
- County: Babolsar
- Bakhsh: Rudbast
- Rural District: Pazevar

Population (2016)
  - Total: 478
- Time zone: UTC+3:30 (IRST)

Bala Naqib Kola (Persian: بالانقيب كلا, also Romanized as Bālā Naqīb Kolā) is a village in Pazevar Rural District, Rudbast District, Babolsar County, Mazandaran Province, Iran.

Its nearby villages are Seyyed Mahalleh to its west, Kari Kola to its northwest, Aysi Kola to its east, Reza Kola and Fulad Kola to its south, and Darzi Naqib Kola to its north.

At the time of the 2006 National Census, the village's population was 470 in 124 households. The following census in 2011 counted 443 people in 132 households. The 2016 census measured the population of the village as 478 people in 173 households.
