= Navai Mahalleh =

Village in Mazandaran province, Iran

Navai Mahalleh Persian: نوائي محله
- Village
- Location within Iran
- Coordinates: 36°36′52″N 52°29′04″E
- Country: Iran
- Province: Mazandaran
- County: Fereydunkenar
- District: Dehferi
- Rural District: Emamzadeh Abdollah-ye Jonubi

Population (2016)
  - Total: 972
- Time zone: UTC+3:30 (IRST)

Navai Mahalleh (Persian: نوائي محله) (Note: Also romanized as Navā’ī Maḩalleh; also known as Navā’ī Maḩalleh-ye Bozorg) is a village in Emamzadeh Abdollah-ye Jonubi Rural District (Note: Formerly Emamzadeh Abdollah Rural District) of Dehferi District in Fereydunkenar County, Mazandaran province, Iran.

== Demographics ==
=== Population ===
At the time of the 2006 National Census, the village's population was 1,024 in 291 households, when it was in Emamzadeh Abdollah Rural District (Note: Renamed Emamzadeh Abdollah-ye Jonubi Rural District) of the former Fereydunkenar District in Babolsar County. The following census in 2011 counted 1,057 people in 347 households, by which time the district had been separated from the county in the establishment of Fereydunkenar County. The rural district was transferred to the new Dehferi District and renamed Emamzadeh Abdollah-ye Jonubi Rural District. The 2016 census measured the population of the village as 972 people in 351 households.
