= Aysi Kola =

Village in Mazandaran province, Iran

Aysi Kola Persian: ایسی كلا
- Village
- Location within Iran
- Coordinates: 36°36′53″N 52°38′20″E
- Country: Iran
- Province: Mazandaran
- County: Babolsar
- District: Rudbast
- Rural District: Pazevar

Population (2016)
  - Total: 872
- Time zone: UTC+3:30 (IRST)

Aysi Kola (Persian: ایسی كلا) (Note: Also romanized as Aysī Kolā; also known as Asbī Kolā and Asī Kolā) is a village in, and the capital of, Pazevar Rural District in Rudbast District of Babolsar County, Mazandaran province, Iran.

It is a northwestern suburb of Amirkola city. Nearby villages are Bala Naqib Kola to its west, Darzi Naqib Kola to its north, Reza Kola to its southwest, Sar Hammam and Said Kola to its east, and Kasegar Mahalleh to its northeast.

== Demographics ==
=== Population ===
At the time of the 2006 National Census, the village's population was 667 in 175 households. The following census in 2011 counted 934 people in 277 households. The 2016 census measured the population of the village as 872 people in 277 households.
