= Kardegar Mahalleh, Fereydunkenar =

Neighborhood in Mazandaran province, Iran

Kardegar Mahalleh Persian: كاردگرمحله
- Neighborhood
- Location within Iran
- Coordinates: 36°38′19″N 52°29′59″E
- Country: Iran
- Province: Mazandaran
- County: Fereydunkenar
- District: Dehferi
- City: Astaneh-ye Sara

Population (2016)
  - Total: 2,465
- Time zone: UTC+3:30 (IRST)

Kardegar Mahalleh (Persian: كاردگرمحله) (Note: Also romanized as Kārd Gar Maḩalleh, and Kārdegar Maḩalleh) is a neighborhood in the city of Astaneh-ye Sara in Dehferi District of Fereydunkenar County, Mazandaran province, Iran. As a village, it served as capital of both the district and Emamzadeh Abdollah-ye Jonubi Rural District (Note: Formerly Emamzadeh Abdollah Rural District) until the rural district's capital was transferred to the village of Kuchek Bisheh-ye Mahalleh.

== Demographics ==
=== Population ===
At the time of the 2006 National Census, Kardegar Mahalleh's population was 2,145 in 555 households, when it was a village in Emamzadeh Abdollah Rural District (Note: Renamed Emamzadeh Abdollah-ye Jonubi Rural District) of the former Fereydunkenar District in Babolsar County. The following census in 2011 counted 2,457 people in 732 households, by which time the district had been separated from the county in the establishment of Fereydunkenar County. The rural district was transferred to the new Dehferi District and renamed Emamzadeh Abdollah-ye Jonubi Rural District. The 2016 census measured the population of the village as 2,465 people in 824 households, the most populous in its rural district.

In 2021, Kardegar Mahalleh merged with the village of Shir Mahalleh in the formation of the village of Astaneh-ye Sara. The village became a city in 2022.
