= Heydar Kola =

Village in Mazandaran province, Iran

Heydar Kola Persian: حيدركلا
- Village
- Location within Iran
- Coordinates: 36°37′23″N 52°32′57″E
- Country: Iran
- Province: Mazandaran
- County: Fereydunkenar
- District: Central
- Rural District: Barik Rud-e Shomali

Population (2016)
  - Total: 539
- Time zone: UTC+3:30 (IRST)

Heydar Kola (Persian: حيدركلا) (Note: Also romanized as Ḩeydar Kolā) is a village in Barik Rud-e Shomali Rural District (Note: Formerly Barik Rud Rural District) of the Central District in Fereydunkenar County, Mazandaran province, Iran.

== Demographics ==
=== Population ===
At the time of the 2006 National Census, the village's population was 491 in 127 households, when it was in Barik Rud Rural District (Note: Renamed Barik Rud-e Shomali Rural District) of the former Fereydunkenar District in Babolsar County. The following census in 2011 counted 546 people in 161 households, by which time the district had been separated from the county in the establishment of Fereydunkenar County. The rural district was transferred to the new Central District and renamed Barik Rud-e Shomali Rural District. The 2016 census measured the population of the village as 539 people in 182 households.
