= Ferem, Fereydunkenar =

Village in Mazandaran province, Iran

Ferem Persian: فرم
- Village
- Location within Iran
- Coordinates: 36°37′25″N 52°32′31″E
- Country: Iran
- Province: Mazandaran
- County: Fereydunkenar
- District: Central
- Rural District: Barik Rud-e Shomali

Population (2016)
  - Total: 1,064
- Time zone: UTC+3:30 (IRST)

Ferem (Persian: فرم) (Note: Also romanized as Faram) is a village in Barik Rud-e Shomali Rural District (Note: Formerly Barik Rud Rural District) of the Central District in Fereydunkenar County, Mazandaran province, Iran.

== Demographics ==
=== Population ===
At the time of the 2006 National Census, the village's population was 1,041 in 275 households, when it was in Barik Rud Rural District (Note: Renamed Barik Rud-e Shomali Rural District) of the former Fereydunkenar District in Babolsar County. The following census in 2011 counted 1,108 people in 350 households, by which time the district had been separated from the county in the establishment of Fereydunkenar County. The rural district was transferred to the new Central District and renamed Barik Rud-e Shomali Rural District. The 2016 census measured the population of the village as 1,064 people in 374 households.
