= Pain Navai Mahalleh =

Village in Mazandaran province, Iran

Pain Navai Mahalleh Persian: پائين نوائي محله
- Village
- Location within Iran
- Country: Iran
- Province: Mazandaran
- County: Fereydunkenar
- District: Dehferi
- Rural District: Emamzadeh Abdollah-ye Jonubi

Population (2016)
  - Total: 127
- Time zone: UTC+3:30 (IRST)

Pain Navai Mahalleh (Persian: پائين نوائي محله) (Note: Also romanized as Pā’īn Navā’ī Maḩalleh; also known as Navāee Maḩalleh-ye Soflá) is a village in Emamzadeh Abdollah-ye Jonubi Rural District (Note: Formerly Emamzadeh Abdollah Rural District) of Dehferi District in Fereydunkenar County, Mazandaran province, Iran.

== Demographics ==
=== Population ===
At the time of the 2006 National Census, the village's population was 149 in 39 households, when it was in Emamzadeh Abdollah Rural District (Note: Renamed Emamzadeh Abdollah-ye Jonubi Rural District) of the former Fereydunkenar District in Babolsar County. The following census in 2011 counted 126 people in 38 households, by which time the district had been separated from the county in the establishment of Fereydunkenar County. The rural district was transferred to the new Dehferi District and renamed Emamzadeh Abdollah-ye Jonubi Rural District. The 2016 census measured the population of the village as 127 people in 45 households.
