= Suteh, Fereydunkenar =

Village in Mazandaran province, Iran

Suteh Persian: سوته
- Village
- Location within Iran
- Coordinates: 36°38′29″N 52°32′28″E
- Country: Iran
- Province: Mazandaran
- County: Fereydunkenar
- District: Central
- Rural District: Barik Rud-e Shomali

Population (2016)
  - Total: 1,511
- Time zone: UTC+3:30 (IRST)

Suteh (Persian: سوته) (Note: Also romanized as Sūteh) is a village in, and the capital of, Barik Rud-e Shomali Rural District (Note: Formerly Barik Rud Rural District) in the Central District of Fereydunkenar County, Mazandaran province, Iran. The previous capital of the rural district was the village of Firuzabad, now a neighborhood of the city of Fereydunkenar.

== Demographics ==
=== Population ===
At the time of the 2006 National Census, the village's population was 1,585 in 448 households, when it was in Barik Rud Rural District (Note: Renamed Barik Rud-e Shomali Rural District) of the former Fereydunkenar District in Babolsar County. The following census in 2011 counted 1,586 people in 523 households, by which time the district had been separated from the county in the establishment of Fereydunkenar County. The rural district was transferred to the new Central District and renamed Barik Rud-e Shomali Rural District. The 2016 census measured the population of the village as 1,511 people in 535 households. It was the most populous village in its rural district.
