= Mir Bazar =

Mir Bazar ميربازار
- Neighborhhod
- Location within Iran
- Coordinates: 36°38′04″N 52°37′59″E
- Country: Iran
- Province: Mazandaran
- County: Babolsar
- Bakhsh: Rudbast
- City: Hadishahr

Population (2011)
  - Total: 1,716
- Time zone: UTC+3:30 (IRST)

Mir Bazar (Persian: ميربازار, also Romanized as Mīr Bāzār; also known as Bālā Mīr Bāzār, Mīr Bāzār-e Bālā, and Mir Qal‘eh) is a neighborhood in the city of Hadishahr, in Babolsar County, Mazandaran Province, Iran. Formerly it was a village in Pazevar Rural District.

At the time of the 2006 National Census, the village's population was 1,689 in 446 households. The following census in 2011 counted 1,716 people in 518 households. Mir Bazar was annexed to Hadishahr by the time of the 2016 census.
