= Kikha Mahalleh =

Village in Mazandaran province, Iran

Kikha Mahalleh Persian: كيخامحله
- Neighbourhood
- Location within Iran
- Coordinates: 36°38′45″N 52°36′53″E
- Country: Iran
- Province: Mazandaran
- County: Babolsar
- District: Rudbast
- City: Hadishahr (Kalleh Bast)

Population (2011)
  - Total: 981
- Time zone: UTC+3:30 (IRST)

Kikha Mahalleh (Persian: كيخامحله) (Note: Also romanized as Kīkhā Maḩalleh; also known as Kīākhā Maḩalleh) is a neighborhood in the city of Hadishahr in Babolsar County of Mazandaran province, Iran.

Formerly, it was a village in Khoshk Rud Rural District of Rudbast District.

== Demographics ==
=== Population ===
Population history: Kikha Mahalleh
Year	Pop.	±%
1950	250	—
1956	337	+34.8%
1966	500	+48.4%
1976	594	+18.8%
1986	826	+39.1%
2006	941	+13.9%
2011	981	+4.3%

Kikha Mahalleh was a village in Rudbast Rural District, in Babolsar District of Babol County, in 1956 census, its population was 337 people. At the 1966 census, the village's population was 500 people in 84 households. The village had Mosque and Elementary School. The agricultural products of the village were fruits such as Walnut and Pomegranate, and annual crops such as rice.

At the time of the 1976 census, Kikha Mahalleh had a population of 594 people in 92 households, and had power connection. The 1986 census measured the population as 826 people in 137 households. The village's educated population was 425, and 228 were employed.

In 1987, Babolsar District became a separate county. In 1995, It was transferred to Khoshk Rud Rural District in Rudbast District.

At the time of the 2006 National Census, the village's population was 941 in 237 households. The following census in 2011 counted 981 people in 295 households. The village did not appear in the 2016 census as it was absorbed by the city of Hadishahr.
