= Galesh Kola-ye Bala =

Galesh Kola-ye Bala گالشکلا بالا
- neighborhhod
- Location within Iran
- Coordinates: 36°38′29″N 52°46′22″E
- Country: Iran
- Province: Mazandaran
- County: Babolsar
- Bakhsh: Bahnemir
- Rural District: Bahnemir
- Village: Galesh Kola

Population (2006)
  - Total: 371
- Time zone: UTC+3:30 (IRST)

Galesh Kola-ye Bala (Persian: گالشکلا بالا, also Romanized as Gālesh Kolā-ye Bālā; also known as Bālā Gālesh Kolā and Gālesh-e Bālā) is a neighborhood in Galesh Kola village in Bahnemir Rural District of Babolsar County, in Mazandaran Province, Iran. At the 2006 census, its population was 371, in 88 families, when it was a separate village.
