= Naqib Kola =

Naqib Kola (Persian: نقيب كلا) may refer to:

- Naqib Kola-ye Salas, Babol County
- Bala Naqib Kola, Babolsar County
- Darzi Naqib Kola, Babolsar County
- Pain Naqib Kola, Babolsar County
