= Darabdin-e Rowshan =

Darabdin-e Rowshan داراب دين روشن
- Village
- Location within Iran
- Coordinates: 36°40′53″N 52°46′17″E
- Country: Iran
- Province: Mazandaran
- County: Babolsar
- Bakhsh: Bahnemir
- Rural District: Bahnemir

Population (2016)
  - Total: 665
- Time zone: UTC+3:30 (IRST)

Darabdin-e Rowshan (Persian: داراب دين روشن, also Romanized as Dārābdīn-e Rowshan) is a suburb of Bahnemir city and a village in Bahnemir Rural District, Bahnemir District, Babolsar County, Mazandaran Province, Iran. At the 2006 census, its population was 659, in 164 families.

At the time of the 2006 National Census, the village's population was 659 people in 164 households. The following census in 2011 counted 721 people in 213 households. The 2016 census measured the population of the village as 665 people in 225 households. .
