= Darzi Mahalleh =

Darzi Mahalleh (Persian: درزي محله) may refer to:

- Darzi Mahalleh, Gilan
- Darzi Mahalleh, Babol, Mazandaran Province
- Darzi Mahalleh, Babolsar, Mazandaran Province
- Darzi Mahalleh, Neka, Mazandaran Province
