= Darzi Naqib Kola =

Village in Mazandaran province, Iran

Darzi Naqib Kola Persian: درزی نقیب کلا
- Village
- Location within Iran
- Coordinates: 36°37′18″N 52°38′09″E
- Country: Iran
- Province: Mazandaran
- County: Babolsar
- District: Rudbast
- Rural District: Pazevar

Population (2016)
  - Total: 1,435
- Time zone: UTC+3:30 (IRST)

Darzi Naqib Kola (Persian: درزی نقیب یلا) (Note: Also romanized as Darzī Naqīb Kolā) is a village in Pazevar Rural District of Rudbast District in Babolsar County, Mazandaran province, Iran.

Nearby villages are Aysi Kola to its south, Bala Naqib Kola to its southwest, Pain Naqib Kola to its north, Kasegar Mahalleh to its east and Sar Hammam to its southeast.

== Demographics ==
=== Population ===
At the time of the 2006 National Census, the village's population was 1,330 in 360 households. The following census in 2011 counted 1,418 people in 435 households. The 2016 census measured the population of the village as 1,435 people in 482 households.
