= Qadi Mahalleh, Babolsar =

Qadi Mahalleh قادی محله
- Village
- Location within Iran
- Coordinates: 36°37′52″N 52°37′09″E
- Country: Iran
- Province: Mazandaran
- County: Babolsar
- Bakhsh: Rudbast
- Rural District: Pazevar

Population (2016)
  - Total: 281
- Time zone: UTC+3:30 (IRST)

Qadi Mahalleh (Persian: قادی محله, also Romanized as Qādī Maḩalleh) is a village in Pazevar Rural District, Rudbast District, Babolsar County, Mazandaran Province, Iran.

At the time of the 2006 National Census, the village's population was 228 in 59 households. The following census in 2011 counted 280 people in 83 households. The 2016 census measured the population of the village as 281 people in 93 households.
