= Khard Mard =

Khard Mard or Kherad Mard (Persian: خردمرد) may refer to:

- Khard Mard-e Anisi
- Khard Mard-e Rezai
