= Sorkhdasht =

Village in Mazandaran province, Iran

Sorkhdasht Persian: سرخ دشت
- Village
- Location within Iran
- Coordinates: 36°38′07″N 52°46′02″E
- Country: Iran
- Province: Mazandaran
- County: Babolsar
- District: Bahnemir
- Rural District: Bahnemir

Population (2016)
  - Total: 1,102
- Time zone: UTC+3:30 (IRST)

Sorkhdasht (Persian: سرخ دشت) is a village in Bahnemir Rural District of Bahnemir District in Babolsar County, Mazandaran province, Iran.

== Demographics ==
=== Population ===
At the time of the 2006 National Census, the village's population was 1,155 in 306 households. The following census in 2011 counted 1,203 people in 365 households. The 2016 census measured the population of the village as 1,102 people in 383 households.
