= Armich Kola =

Armich Kola آرميچ كلا (Mazandarani) آرمیج کلا
- Village
- Location within Iran
- Coordinates: 36°39′30″N 52°38′10″E
- Country: Iran
- Province: Mazandaran
- County: Babolsar
- Bakhsh: Rudbast
- Rural District: Pazevar

Population (2016)
  - Total: 878
- Time zone: UTC+3:30 (IRST)

Armich Kola (Persian: آرميچ كلا, also Romanized as Ārmīch Kolā), also known as Armij Kela,(Mazandarani: آرمیج کلا, also Romanized as Ārmīj Kēlā) is a village in Pazevar Rural District, Rudbast District, Babolsar County, Mazandaran Province, Iran. At the 2016 census, its population was 878, in 298 families. Up from 805 in 2006.
