= Afratakht, Babolsar =

Afratakht افراتخت
- Village
- Location within Iran
- Coordinates: 36°42′31″N 52°46′23″E
- Country: Iran
- Province: Mazandaran
- County: Babolsar
- Bakhsh: Bahnemir
- Rural District: Bahnemir

Population (2016)
  - Total: 493
- Time zone: UTC+3:30 (IRST)

Afratakht (Persian: افراتخت, also Romanized as Afrātakht) is a village in Bahnemir Rural District, Bahnemir District, Babolsar County, Mazandaran Province, Iran.

At the time of the 2006 National Census, the village's population was 478 people in 117 households. The following census in 2011 counted 496 people in 139 households. The 2016 census measured the population of the village as 493 people in 167 households. .
