= Kaleh =

Kaleh (Persian: كله or كاله) may refer to:

- Kaleh, East Azerbaijan (كله - Kaleh), Iran
- Kaleh, Hamadan (كاله - Kāleh), Iran
- Kaleh, Mazandaran (كاله - Kāleh), Iran

== See also ==
- Kalleh (disambiguation)
