= Nosrat Kola =

Village in Mazandaran province, Iran

Nosrat Kola Persian: نصرت كلا
- Village
- Location within Iran
- Coordinates: 36°37′29″N 52°36′02″E
- Country: Iran
- Province: Mazandaran
- County: Babolsar
- District: Rudbast
- Rural District: Khoshk Rud

Population (2016)
  - Total: 605
- Time zone: UTC+3:30 (IRST)

Nosrat Kola (Persian: نصرت كلا) (Note: Also romanized as Noşrat Kolā; also known as Neşrā Kolā) is a village in Khoshk Rud Rural District of Rudbast District in Babolsar County, Mazandaran province, Iran.

== Demographics ==
=== Population ===
At the time of the 2006 National Census, the village's population was 533 in 139 households. The following census in 2011 counted 573 people in 172 households. The 2016 census measured the population of the village as 605 people in 201 households.
