= Paru Mahalleh-ye Mangelab =

Paru Mahalleh-ye Mangelab پارومحله منگلاب
- Village
- Location within Iran
- Coordinates: 36°38′59″N 52°46′17″E
- Country: Iran
- Province: Mazandaran
- County: Babolsar
- Bakhsh: Bahnemir
- Rural District: Bahnemir

Population (2016)
  - Total: 155
- Time zone: UTC+3:30 (IRST)

Paru Mahalleh-ye Mangelab (Persian: پارومحله منگلاب, also Romanized as Pārū Maḩalleh-ye Mangelāb; also known as Pārū Maḩalleh) is a village in Bahnemir Rural District, Bahnemir District, Babolsar County, Mazandaran Province, Iran.

At the time of the 2006 National Census, the village's population was 193 in 53 households. The following census in 2011 counted 183 people in 60 households. The 2016 census measured the population of the village as 155 people in 58 households.
