= Moqri Kola, Babolsar =

Village in Mazandaran province, Iran

Moqri Kola Persian: مقريكلا
- Village
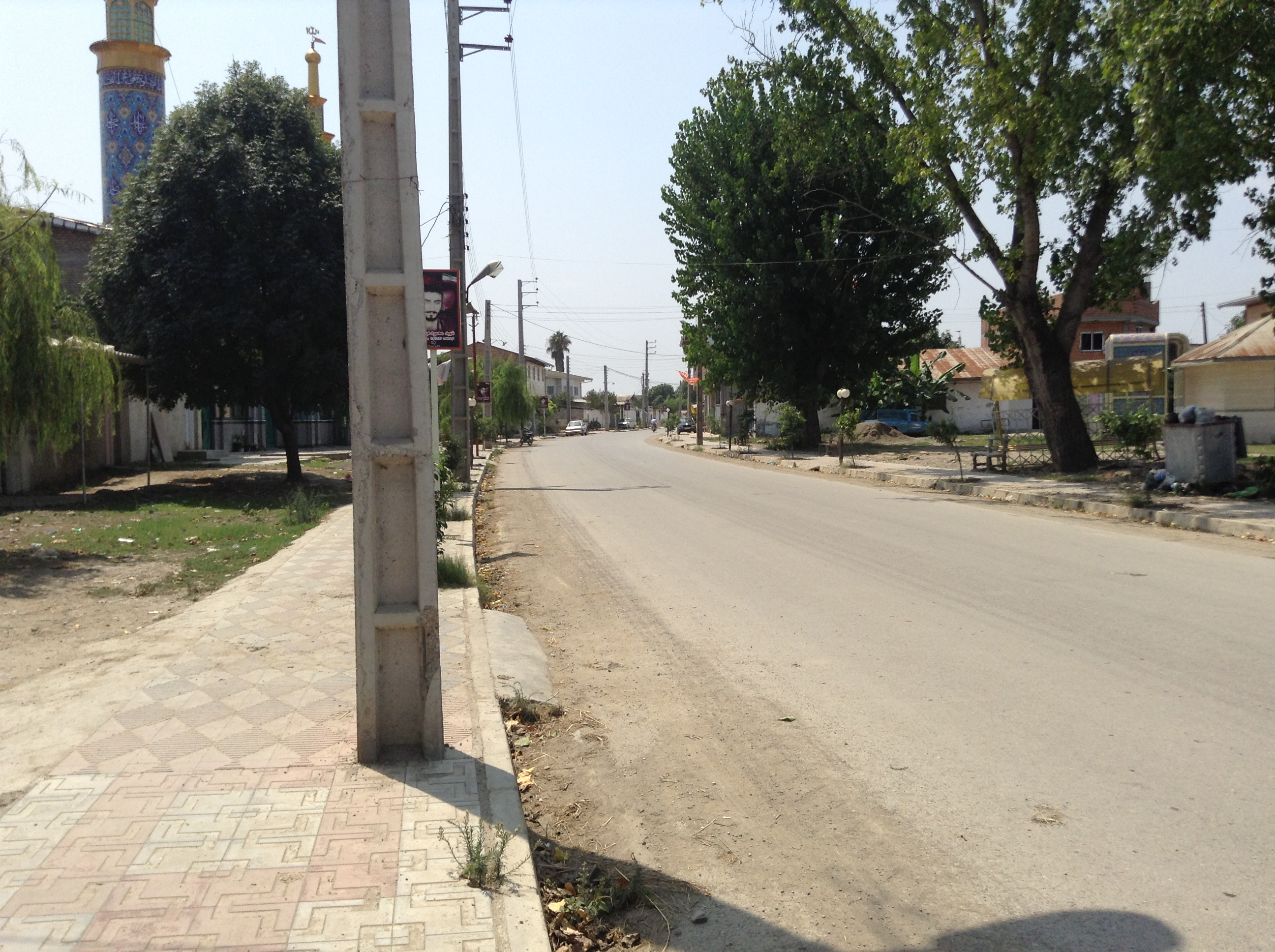
- A street in Moghri Kola

- Location within Iran
- Coordinates: 36°37′01″N 52°40′30″E
- Country: Iran
- Province: Mazandaran
- County: Babolsar
- District: Rudbast
- Rural District: Pazevar

Population (2016)
  - Total: 1,505
- Time zone: UTC+3:30 (IRST)

Moqri Kola (Persian: مقريكلا) (Note: Also romanized as Moqrī Kolā) is a village in Pazevar Rural District of Rudbast District in Babolsar County, Mazandaran province, Iran. It is a noertheastern suburb of Amirkola city.

== Demographics ==
=== Population ===
At the time of the 2006 National Census, the village's population was 1,411 in 361 households. The following census in 2011 counted 1,457 people in 436 households. The 2016 census measured the population of the village as 1,505 people in 526 households.
