= Mangelab =

Mangelab منگلاب
- Village
- Location within Iran
- Coordinates: 36°39′21″N 52°45′49″E
- Country: Iran
- Province: Mazandaran
- County: Babolsar
- Bakhsh: Bahnemir
- Rural District: Bahnemir

Population (2016)
  - Total: 172
- Time zone: UTC+3:30 (IRST)

Mangelab (Persian: منگلاب, also Romanized as Mangelāb) is a village in Bahnemir Rural District, Bahnemir District, Babolsar County, Mazandaran Province, Iran.

At the time of the 2006 National Census, the village's population was 155 in 41 households. The following census in 2011 counted 142 people in 49 households. The 2016 census measured the population of the village as 172 people in 61 households.
