= Valik Rudposht =

Village in Mazandaran province, Iran

Valik Rudposht Persian: وليكرودپشت
- Village
- Location within Iran
- Coordinates: 36°36′39″N 52°33′32″E
- Country: Iran
- Province: Mazandaran
- County: Babolsar
- District: Rudbast
- Rural District: Khoshk Rud

Population (2016)
  - Total: 479
- Time zone: UTC+3:30 (IRST)

Valik Rudposht (Persian: وليكرودپشت) (Note: Also romanized as Valīk Rūdposht) is a village in Khoshk Rud Rural District of Rudbast District in Babolsar County, Mazandaran province, Iran.

== Demographics ==
=== Population ===
At the time of the 2006 National Census, the village's population was 477 in 113 households. The following census in 2011 counted 516 people in 141 households. The 2016 census measured the population of the village as 479 people in 162 households.
