= Moqri Kola =

Moqri Kola or Moqri Kala or Maqri Kala (Persian: مقريكلا) may refer to:

- Moqri Kola, Babol
- Moqri Kola, Babolsar
