= Zahed Kola =

Zahed Kola or Zahed Kala or Zehed Kola (Persian: زاهدكلا) may refer to:

- Zahed Kola, Babol
- Zahed Kola, Fereydunkenar
- Zahed Kola, Qaem Shahr
