= Kuner =

Village in Mazandaran province, Iran

Kuner Persian: كونر
- Village
- Location within Iran
- Coordinates: 36°36′54″N 52°34′24″E
- Country: Iran
- Province: Mazandaran
- County: Babolsar
- District: Rudbast
- Rural District: Khoshk Rud

Population (2016)
  - Total: 220
- Time zone: UTC+3:30 (IRST)

Kuner (Persian: كونر) (Note: Also romanized as Kūner) is a village in Khoshk Rud Rural District of Rudbast District in Babolsar County, Mazandaran province, Iran.

== Demographics ==
=== Population ===
At the time of the 2006 National Census, the village's population was 203 in 45 households. The following census in 2011 counted 225 people in 63 households. The 2016 census measured the population of the village as 220 people in 70 households.
