= Astaneh-ye Sara =

City in Mazandaran province, Iran

Astaneh-ye Sara Persian: آستانه‌سرا
- City
- Location within Iran
- Coordinates: 36°38′19″N 52°29′59″E
- Country: Iran
- Province: Mazandaran
- County: Fereydunkenar
- District: Dehferi
- Established as a city: 2022
- Time zone: UTC+3:30 (IRST)

Astaneh-ye Sara (Persian: آستانه‌سرا) (Note: Also romanized as Āstāneh-ye Sarā) is a city in Dehferi District of Fereydunkenar County, Mazandaran province, Iran.

== History ==
In 2007, Fereydunkenar District was separated from Babolsar County in the establishment of Fereydunkenar County, which was divided into two districts of two rural districts each, with Fereydunkenar as its capital and only city at the time.

In 2021, Kardegar Mahalleh and Shir Mahalleh, villages in Emamzadeh Abdollah-ye Jonubi Rural District (Note: Formerly Emamzadeh Abdollah Rural District) were merged in the formation of the village of Astaneh-ye Sara. The approval of the new municipality license for the village was announced in 2022, elevating it to the city of Astaneh-ye Sara.
