= Galesh Kola =

Galesh Kola (Persian: گالش كلا) may refer to:

- Galesh Kola, Amol
- Galesh Kola-ye Bala, Babolsar
- Galesh Kola-ye Pain, Babolsar
- Galesh Kola, Sari
- Galesh Kola, Savadkuh
