= Kabutardan, Mazandaran =

Village in Mazandaran province, Iran

Kabutardan Persian: كبوتردان
- Village
- Location within Iran
- Coordinates: 36°38′11″N 52°41′47″E
- Country: Iran
- Province: Mazandaran
- County: Babolsar
- District: Rudbast
- Rural District: Pazevar

Population (2016)
  - Total: 953
- Time zone: UTC+3:30 (IRST)

Kabutardan (Persian: كبوتردان) (Note: Also romanized as Kabūtardān; also known as Kabūtūdān) is a village in Pazevar Rural District of Rudbast District in Babolsar County, Mazandaran province, Iran.

== Demographics ==
=== Population ===
At the time of the 2006 National Census, the village's population was 842 in 218 households. The following census in 2011 counted 928 people in 276 households. The 2016 census measured the population of the village as 953 people in 309 households.
