= Rowshandan =

Village in Mazandaran province, Iran

Rowshandan Persian: روشندان
- Village
- Location within Iran
- Coordinates: 36°40′19″N 52°47′15″E
- Country: Iran
- Province: Mazandaran
- County: Babolsar
- District: Bahnemir
- Rural District: Bahnemir

Population (2016)
  - Total: 831
- Time zone: UTC+3:30 (IRST)

Rowshandan (Persian: روشندان) (Note: Also romanized as Rowshandān) is a village in Bahnemir Rural District of Bahnemir District in Babolsar County, Mazandaran province, Iran.

== Demographics ==
=== Population ===
At the time of the 2006 National Census, the village's population was 830 in 214 households. The following census in 2011 counted 891 people in 266 households. The 2016 census measured the population of the village as 831 people in 281 households.
