= Arab Kheyl, Babolsar =

Village in Mazandaran province, Iran

Arab Kheyl Persian: عرب‌خيل
- Village
- Location within Iran
- Coordinates: 36°41′53″N 52°44′52″E
- Country: Iran
- Province: Mazandaran
- County: Babolsar
- District: Bahnemir
- Rural District: Bahnemir

Population (2016)
  - Total: 1,326
- Time zone: UTC+3:30 (IRST)

Arab Kheyl (Persian: عرب‌خيل) (Note: Also romanized as ‘Arab Khil; also known as Kaleh ‘Arab Kheyl) is a village in Bahnemir Rural District of Bahnemir District in Babolsar County, Mazandaran province, Iran.

== Demographics ==
=== Population ===
At the time of the 2006 National Census, the village's population was 1,261 in 338 households. The following census in 2011 counted 1,257 people in 398 households. The 2016 census measured the population of the village as 1,326 people in 445 households.
