= Karim Kola =

Village in Mazandaran province, Iran

Karim Kola Persian: كريم كلا
- Village
- Location within Iran
- Coordinates: 36°40′50″N 52°44′56″E
- Country: Iran
- Province: Mazandaran
- County: Babolsar
- District: Bahnemir
- Rural District: Bahnemir

Population (2016)
  - Total: 936
- Time zone: UTC+3:30 (IRST)

Karim Kola (Persian: كريم كلا) (Note: Also romanized as Karīm Kalā and Karīm Kolā)) is a village in Bahnemir Rural District of Bahnemir District in Babolsar County, Mazandaran province, Iran.

== Demographics ==
=== Population ===
At the time of the 2006 National Census, the village's population was 814 in 202 households. The following census in 2011 counted 796 people in 241 households. The 2016 census measured the population of the village as 936 people in 311 households.
