= Mirud Sar =

Village in Mazandaran province, Iran

Mirud Sar Persian: ميرود سر
- Village
- Location within Iran
- Coordinates: 36°43′24.6″N 52°46′26.54″E
- Country: Iran
- Province: Mazandaran
- County: Babolsar
- District: Bahnemir
- Rural District: Bahnemir

Population (2016)
  - Total: 185
- Time zone: UTC+3:30 (IRST)

Mirud Sar (Persian: ميرود سر) (Note: Also romanized as Mīrūd Sar) is a village in Bahnemir Rural District of Babolsar County, in Mazandaran province, Iran.

== Demographics ==
=== Population ===
The village was not mentioned in the 2006 census results. At the 2011 census its population was 148 people in 49 households. The 2016 census measured the population of the village as 185 people in 59 households.
