= Raz Kenar =

Village in Mazandaran province, Iran

Raz Kenar Persian: رزكنار
- Village
- Location within Iran
- Coordinates: 36°36′25″N 52°35′26″E
- Country: Iran
- Province: Mazandaran
- County: Babolsar
- District: Rudbast
- Rural District: Khoshk Rud

Population (2016)
  - Total: 840
- Time zone: UTC+3:30 (IRST)

Raz Kenar (Persian: رزكنار) (Note: Also romanized as Raz Kenār) is a village in Khoshk Rud Rural District of Rudbast District in Babolsar County, Mazandaran province, Iran.

== Demographics ==
=== Population ===
At the time of the 2006 National Census, the village's population was 811 in 211 households. The following census in 2011 counted 806 people in 244 households. The 2016 census measured the population of the village as 840 people in 290 households.
