= Eznabad =

Village in Mazandaran province, Iran

Eznabad Persian: ازن اباد
- Village
- Location within Iran
- Coordinates: 36°41′58″N 52°48′31″E
- Country: Iran
- Province: Mazandaran
- County: Babolsar
- District: Bahnemir
- Rural District: Bahnemir

Population (2016)
  - Total: 705
- Time zone: UTC+3:30 (IRST)

Eznabad (Persian: ازن اباد) (Note: Also romanized as Eznābād; also known as ‘Azīnābād and Ez̄navā) is a village in Bahnemir Rural District of Bahnemir District in Babolsar County, Mazandaran province, Iran.

== Demographics ==
=== Population ===
At the time of the 2006 National Census, the village's population was 745 in 189 households. The following census in 2011 counted 754 people in 218 households. The 2016 census measured the population of the village as 705 people in 234 households.
