= Bala Ahmad Kola =

Village in Mazandaran province, Iran

Bala Ahmad Kola Persian: بالااحمدكلا
- Village
- Location within Iran
- Coordinates: 36°38′57″N 52°40′02″E
- Country: Iran
- Province: Mazandaran
- County: Babolsar
- District: Rudbast
- Rural District: Pazevar

Population (2016)
  - Total: 1,277
- Time zone: UTC+3:30 (IRST)

Bala Ahmad Kola (Persian: بالااحمدكلا) (Note: Also romanized as Bālā Aḩmad Kolā) is a village in Pazevar Rural District of Rudbast District in Babolsar County, Mazandaran province, Iran.

== Demographics ==
=== Population ===
At the time of the 2006 National Census, the village's population was 1,280 in 331 households. The following census in 2011 counted 1,314 people in 396 households. The 2016 census measured the population of the village as 1,277 people in 442 households.
