= Hali Bagh =

Hali Bagh هلی باغ
- Village
- Location within Iran
- Coordinates: 36°41′05″N 52°47′19″E
- Country: Iran
- Province: Mazandaran
- County: Babolsar
- Bakhsh: Bahnemir
- Rural District: Bahnemir

Population (2016)
  - Total: 507
- Time zone: UTC+3:30 (IRST)

Hali Bagh (Persian: هلی باغ, also Romanized as Halī Bāgh) is a village in Bahnemir Rural District, Bahnemir District, Babolsar County, Mazandaran Province, Iran.

At the time of the 2006 National Census, the village's population was 563 in 135 households. The following census in 2011 counted 561 people in 160 households. The 2016 census measured the population of the village as 507 people in 174 households.
