= Barik Rud-e Jonubi Rural District =

Rural district in Mazandaran province, Iran

Barik Rud-e Jonubi Rural District Persian: دهستان باريك رود جنوبي
- Rural District
- Location within Iran
- Coordinates: 36°37′N 52°32′E
- Country: Iran
- Province: Mazandaran
- County: Fereydunkenar
- District: Central
- Established: 2007
- Capital: Bi Namad

Population (2016)
  - Total: 4,558
- Time zone: UTC+3:30 (IRST)

Barik Rud-e Jonubi Rural District (Persian: دهستان باريك رود جنوبي) is in the Central District of Fereydunkenar County, Mazandaran province, Iran. Its capital is the village of Bi Namad.

== History ==
In 2007, Fereydunkenar District was separated from Babolsar County in the establishment of Fereydunkenar County, and Barik Rud-e Jonubi Rural District was created in the new Central District.

== Demographics ==
=== Population ===
At the time of the 2011 National Census, the rural district's population was 4,708 inhabitants in 1,393 households. The 2016 census measured the population of the rural district as 4,558 in 1,549 households. The most populous of its nine villages was Bozorg Bisheh-ye Mahalleh, with 1,075 people.

=== Other villages in the rural district ===
- Esbu Kola-ye Karim Kola
- Jazin
- Kola Gar Sara
- Monqar Pey
- Owksar-e Karim Kola
- Tuleh Sara
- Zahed Kola
