= Emamzadeh Abdollah-ye Shomali Rural District =

Rural district in Mazandaran province, Iran

Emamzadeh Abdollah-ye Shomali Rural District Persian: دهستان امامزاده عبدالله شمالی
- Rural District
- Location within Iran
- Coordinates: 36°40′N 52°31′E
- Country: Iran
- Province: Mazandaran
- County: Fereydunkenar
- District: Dehferi
- Established: 2007
- Capital: Ezbaran

Population (2016)
  - Total: 6,760
- Time zone: UTC+3:30 (IRST)

Emamzadeh Abdollah-ye Shomali Rural District (Persian: دهستان امامزاده عبدالله شمالی) is in Dehferi District of Fereydunkenar County, Mazandaran province, Iran. Its capital is the village of Ezbaran.

== History ==
In 2007, Fereydunkenar District was separated from Babolsar County in the establishment of Fereydunkenar County, and Emamzadeh Abdollah-ye Shomali Rural District was created in the new Dehferi District.

== Demographics ==
=== Population ===
At the time of the 2011 census, the rural district's population was 6,600 inhabitants in 1,999 households. The 2016 census measured the population of the rural district as 6,760 in 2,279 households. The most populous of its five villages was Ezbaran, with 2,719 people.

=== Other villages in the rural district ===
- Boneh Kenar
- Mehleban
- Shahrak-e Farzadshahr
- Shira
