= Dughi Kola =

Village in Mazandaran province, Iran

Dughi Kola Persian: دوغي كلا
- Village
- Location within Iran
- Coordinates: 36°36′27″N 52°34′32″E
- Country: Iran
- Province: Mazandaran
- County: Babolsar
- District: Rudbast
- Rural District: Khoshk Rud

Population (2016)
  - Total: 667
- Time zone: UTC+3:30 (IRST)

Dughi Kola (Persian: دوغي كلا) (Note: Also romanized as Dūghī Kalā, Dūghī Kolā, and Dūghīkolā) is a village in Khoshk Rud Rural District of Rudbast District in Babolsar County, Mazandaran province, Iran.

== Demographics ==
=== Population ===
At the time of the 2006 National Census, the village's population was 611 in 157 households. The following census in 2011 counted 671 people in 201 households. The 2016 census measured the population of the village as 667 people in 215 households.
