= Esfandiar Mahalleh =

Village in Mazandaran province, Iran

Esfandiar Mahalleh Persian: اسفنديارمحله
- Village
- Location within Iran
- Coordinates: 36°39′16″N 52°36′36″E
- Country: Iran
- Province: Mazandaran
- County: Babolsar
- District: Rudbast
- Rural District: Khoshk Rud

Population (2016)
  - Total: 195
- Time zone: UTC+3:30 (IRST)

Esfandiar Mahalleh (Persian: اسفنديارمحله) (Note: Also romanized as Esfandīār Maḩalleh) is a village in Khoshk Rud Rural District of Rudbast District in Babolsar County, Mazandaran province, Iran.

== Demographics ==
=== Population ===
At the time of the 2006 National Census, the village's population was 138 in 36 households. The following census in 2011 counted 148 people in 53 households. The 2016 census measured the population of the village as 195 people in 64 households.
