= Sharmeh Kola =

Village in Mazandaran province, Iran

Sharmeh Kola Persian: شرمه كلا
- Village
- Location within Iran
- Coordinates: 36°37′12″N 52°33′52″E
- Country: Iran
- Province: Mazandaran
- County: Babolsar
- District: Rudbast
- Rural District: Khoshk Rud

Population (2016)
  - Total: 291
- Time zone: UTC+3:30 (IRST)

Sharmeh Kola (Persian: شرمه كلا) (Note: Also romanized as Sharmeh Kolā) is a village in Khoshk Rud Rural District of Rudbast District in Babolsar County, Mazandaran province, Iran.

== Demographics ==
=== Population ===
At the time of the 2006 National Census, the village's population was 369 in 93 households. The following census in 2011 counted 310 people in 100 households. The 2016 census measured the population of the village as 291 people in 105 households.
