= Shahid Sara =

Shahid Sara شهيد سرا
- Village
- Interactive map of Shahid Sara
- Coordinates: 36°42′53.2″N 52°44′40.54″E
- Country: Iran
- Province: Mazandaran
- County: Babolsar
- Bakhsh: Bahnemir
- Rural District: Bahnemir

Population (2016)
  - Total: 510
- Time zone: UTC+3:30 (IRST)

Shahid Sara (Persian: شهيد سرا, also Romanized as Shahīd Sarā, also known as Kohneh Mahalleh-ye Mirud) is a village in Bahnemir Rural District, Bahnemir District, Babolsar County, Mazandaran Province, Iran.

At the time of the 2006 National Census, the village's population was 533 people in 137 households. The following census in 2011 counted 473 people in 148 households. The 2016 census measured the population of the village as 510 people in 169 households. .
