= Sepah Mahalleh =

Sepah Mahalleh سپاه محله
- Village
- Location within Iran
- Coordinates: 36°31′14″N 52°34′48″E
- Country: Iran
- Province: Mazandaran
- County: Babolsar
- Bakhsh: Rudbast
- Rural District: Pazevar

Population (2016)
  - Total: 212
- Time zone: UTC+3:30 (IRST)

Sepah Mahalleh (Persian: سپاه محله, also Romanized as Sepāh Maḩalleh; also known as Sepāh-e Dānesh) is a village in Pazevar Rural District, Rudbast District, Babolsar County, Mazandaran Province, Iran. It is a northern suburb of Amirkola city.

At the time of the 2006 National Census, the village's population was 276 in 83 households. The following census in 2011 counted 208 people in 60 households. The 2016 census measured the population of the village as 212 people in 81 households.
