= Azizak =

City in Mazandaran province, Iran

Azizak Persian: عزيزك
- City
- Location within Iran
- Coordinates: 36°38′06″N 52°42′58″E
- Country: Iran
- Province: Mazandaran
- County: Babolsar
- District: Bahnemir
- Rural District: Azizak

Population (2016)
  - Total: 4,283
- Time zone: UTC+3:30 (IRST)

Azizak (Persian: عزيزك) (Note: Also romanized as ‘Azīzak; also known as Dehestān-e ‘Azīzak) is a village in Azizak Rural District of Bahnemir District in Babolsar County, Mazandaran province, Iran.

== Demographics ==
=== Population ===
At the time of the 2006 National Census, the village's population was 3,860 in 1,040 households. The following census in 2011 counted 4,224 people in 1,280 households. The 2016 census measured the population of the village as 4,283 people in 1,434 households. It was the only village in its rural district.
