= Suteh =

Suteh (Persian: سوته) may refer to:

- Suteh, Kermanshah
- Suteh, Kurdistan
- Suteh, Fereydunkenar, Mazandaran Province
- Suteh, Sari, Mazandaran Province
