= Mian Bal =

Village in Mazandaran province, Iran

Mian Bal Persian: ميان بال
- Village
- Location within Iran
- Coordinates: 36°36′30″N 52°34′13″E
- Country: Iran
- Province: Mazandaran
- County: Babolsar
- District: Rudbast
- Rural District: Khoshk Rud

Population (2016)
  - Total: 336
- Time zone: UTC+3:30 (IRST)

Mian Bal (Persian: ميان بال) (Note: Also romanized as Mīān Bāl) is a village in Khoshk Rud Rural District of Rudbast District in Babolsar County, Mazandaran province, Iran.

== Demographics ==
=== Population ===
At the time of the 2006 National Census, the village's population was 304 in 73 households. The following census in 2011 counted 306 people in 92 households. The 2016 census measured the population of the village as 336 people in 116 households.
