= Kar Fun =

Kar Fun كرفون
- Village
- Location within Iran
- Coordinates: 36°43′16″N 52°48′48″E
- Country: Iran
- Province: Mazandaran
- County: Babolsar
- Bakhsh: Bahnemir
- Rural District: Bahnemir

Population (2016)
  - Total: 522
- Time zone: UTC+3:30 (IRST)

Kar Fun (Persian: كرفون, also Romanized as Kar Fūn) is a village in Bahnemir Rural District, Bahnemir District, Babolsar County, Mazandaran Province, Iran.

At the time of the 2006 National Census, the village's population was 481 people in 122 households. The following census in 2011 counted 459 people in 123 households. The 2016 census measured the population of the village as 522 people in 165 households. .
