= Darzi Mahalleh, Babolsar =

Village in Mazandaran province, Iran

Darzi Mahalleh Persian: درزي محله
- Village
- Location within Iran
- Coordinates: 36°39′13″N 52°37′06″E
- Country: Iran
- Province: Mazandaran
- County: Babolsar
- District: Rudbast
- Rural District: Khoshk Rud

Population (2016)
  - Total: 253
- Time zone: UTC+3:30 (IRST)

Darzi Mahalleh (Persian: درزي محله) (Note: Also romanized as Darzī Maḩalleh; also known as Dowzī Maḩalleh) is a village in Khoshk Rud Rural District of Rudbast District in Babolsar County, Mazandaran province, Iran.

== Demographics ==
=== Population ===
At the time of the 2006 National Census, the village's population was 137 in 35 households. The following census in 2011 counted 214 people in 65 households. The 2016 census measured the population of the village as 253 people in 81 households.
