= Khard Mard-e Anisi =

Khard Mard-e Anisi خردمرد انیسی
- Village
- Location within Iran
- Coordinates: 36°39′00″N 52°42′00″E
- Country: Iran
- Province: Mazandaran
- County: Babolsar
- Bakhsh: Rudbast
- Rural District: Pazevar

Population (2016)
  - Total: 463
- Time zone: UTC+3:30 (IRST)

Khard Mard-e Anisi (Persian: خردمرد انیسی, also Romanized as Khard Mard-e Anīsī) is a village in Pazevar Rural District, Rudbast District, Babolsar County, Mazandaran Province, Iran.

At the time of the 2006 National Census, the village's population was 446 in 101 households. The following census in 2011 counted 463 people in 133 households. The 2016 census measured the population of the village as 463 people in 157 households.
