= Kaleh, Mazandaran =

Village in Mazandaran province, Iran

Kaleh Persian: كاله
- Village
- Location within Iran
- Coordinates: 36°41′27″N 52°44′49″E
- Country: Iran
- Province: Mazandaran
- County: Babolsar
- District: Bahnemir
- Rural District: Bahnemir

Population (2016)
  - Total: 1,816
- Time zone: UTC+3:30 (IRST)

Kaleh (Persian: كاله) (Note: Also romanized as Kāleh; also known as Gāneh) is a village in Bahnemir Rural District of Bahnemir District in Babolsar County, Mazandaran province, Iran.

== Demographics ==
=== Population ===
At the time of the 2006 National Census, the village's population was 1,600 in 426 households. The following census in 2011 counted 1,638 people in 510 households. The 2016 census measured the population of the village as 1,816 people in 612 households. It was the most populous village in its rural district.
