= Kari Kola, Babolsar =

Kari Kola كاريكلا
- Village
- Location within Iran
- Coordinates: 36°37′04″N 52°36′49″E
- Country: Iran
- Province: Mazandaran
- County: Babolsar
- Bakhsh: Rudbast
- Rural District: Pazevar

Population (2016)
  - Total: 747
- Time zone: UTC+3:30 (IRST)

Kari Kola (Persian: كاريكلا, also Romanized as Kārī Kolā and Kārī Kalā) is a village in Pazevar Rural District, Rudbast District, Babolsar County, Mazandaran Province, Iran.

At the time of the 2006 National Census, the village's population was 604 in 149 households. The following census in 2011 counted 468 people in 158 households. The 2016 census measured the population of the village as 747 people in 268 households.
