= Molla Kola =

Molla Kola (Persian: ملاكلا) may refer to:

- Molla Kola, Fereydunkenar
- Molla Kola, Mahmudabad
- Molla Kola, Nowshahr
- Molla Kola, Nur
- Molla Kola, Simorgh
