= Naft Chal =

Naft Chal (Persian: نفت چال) may refer to:

- Naft Chal, Babolsar
- Naft Chal, Juybar
- Naft Chal, Savadkuh
