= Khard Mard-e Rezai =

Khard Mard-e Rezai خردمرد رضایی
- Village
- Location within Iran
- Coordinates: 36°38′39″N 52°42′26″E
- Country: Iran
- Province: Mazandaran
- County: Babolsar
- Bakhsh: Rudbast
- Rural District: Pazevar

Population (2016)
  - Total: 354
- Time zone: UTC+3:30 (IRST)

Khard Mard-e Rezai (Persian: خردمرد رضایی, also Romanized as Khard Mard-e Reẕā’ī and Kherad Mard-e Reẕā’ī; also known as Khard Mard) is a village in Pazevar Rural District, Rudbast District, Babolsar County, Mazandaran Province, Iran.

At the time of the 2006 National Census, the village's population was 360 in 99 households. The following census in 2011 counted 336 people in 101 households. The 2016 census measured the population of the village as 354 people in 118 households.
