= Rekun =

Rekun ركون
- Village
- Location within Iran
- Coordinates: 36°35′29″N 52°37′01″E
- Country: Iran
- Province: Mazandaran
- County: Babolsar
- Bakhsh: Rudbast
- Rural District: Pazevar

Population (2016)
  - Total: 213
- Time zone: UTC+3:30 (IRST)

Rekun (Persian: ركون, also Romanized as Rekūn) is a village in Pazevar Rural District, Rudbast District, Babolsar County, Mazandaran Province, Iran.

At the time of the 2006 National Census, the village's population was 193 in 49 households. The following census in 2011 counted 172 people in 53 households. The 2016 census measured the population of the village as 213 people in 72 households.
