= Chupan Kola =

Chupan Kola چوپان كلا
- Village
- Location within Iran
- Coordinates: 36°36′35″N 52°38′27″E
- Country: Iran
- Province: Mazandaran
- County: Babolsar
- Bakhsh: Rudbast
- Rural District: Pazevar

Population (2016)
  - Total: 443
- Time zone: UTC+3:30 (IRST)

Chupan Kola (Persian: چوپان كلا, also Romanized as Chūpān Kolā) is a village in Pazevar Rural District, Rudbast District, Babolsar County, Mazandaran Province, Iran.

At the time of the 2006 National Census, the village's population was 450 in 114 households. The following census in 2011 counted 333 people in 98 households. The 2016 census measured the population of the village as 443 people in 152 households.
