= Said Kola =

Said Kola سعيد كلا
- Village
- Location within Iran
- Coordinates: 36°37′07″N 52°39′08″E
- Country: Iran
- Province: Mazandaran
- County: Babolsar
- Bakhsh: Rudbast
- Rural District: Pazevar

Population (2016)
  - Total: 742
- Time zone: UTC+3:30 (IRST)

Said Kola (Persian: سعيد كلا, also Romanized as Sa‘īd Kolā) is a village in Pazevar Rural District, Rudbast District, Babolsar County, Mazandaran Province, Iran. It is a northern suburb of Amirkola city.

At the time of the 2006 National Census, the village's population was 609 in 158 households. The following census in 2011 counted 638 people in 196 households. The 2016 census measured the population of the village as 742 people in 235 households.
