= Seteh =

Seteh may refer to:

- Set_(mythology)
- Seteh, Iran, a village in Kermanshah Province, Iran
