= Barik Rud-e Shomali Rural District =

Rural district in Mazandaran province, Iran

Barik Rud-e Shomali Rural District Persian: دهستان باريك رود شمالی
- Rural District
- Location within Iran
- Coordinates: 36°40′N 52°34′E
- Country: Iran
- Province: Mazandaran
- County: Fereydunkenar
- District: Central
- Established: 1989
- Capital: Suteh

Population (2016)
  - Total: 3,991
- Time zone: UTC+3:30 (IRST)

Barik Rud-e Shomali Rural District (Persian: دهستان باريك رود شمالی) (Note: Formerly Barik Rud Rural District (دهستان باريك رود)) is in the Central District of Fereydunkenar County, Mazandaran province, Iran. Its capital is the village of Suteh. The previous capital of the rural district was the village of Firuzabad, now a neighborhood in the city of Fereydunkenar.

== Demographics ==
=== Population ===
At the time of the 2006 National Census, the rural district's population (as Barik Rud Rural District of the former Fereydunkenar District in Babolsar County) was 4,506 in 1,277 households. In the following census of 2011, there were 3,914 inhabitants in 1,235 households, by which time the district had been separated from the county in the establishment of Fereydunkenar County. The rural district was transferred to the new Central District and renamed Barik Rud-e Shomali Rural District. The 2016 census measured the population of the rural district as 3,991 in 1,381 households. The most populous of its seven villages was Suteh, with 1,511 people.

=== Other villages in the rural district ===
- Eslamabad
- Ferem
- Heydar Kola
- Molla Kola
- Shahrak-e Darya Sar
