= Naft Chal, Babolsar =

Naft Chal نفت چال
- Village
- Location within Iran
- Coordinates: 36°43′35″N 52°47′50″E
- Country: Iran
- Province: Mazandaran
- County: Babolsar
- Bakhsh: Bahnemir
- Rural District: Bahnemir

Population (2016)
  - Total: 560
- Time zone: UTC+3:30 (IRST)

Naft Chal (Persian: نفت چال, also Romanized as Naft Chāl) is a coastal village in Bahnemir Rural District, Bahnemir District, Babolsar County, Mazandaran Province, Iran.

At the time of the 2006 National Census, the village's population was 519 people in 121 households. The following census in 2011 counted 565 people in 153 households. The 2016 census measured the population of the village as 560 people in 183 households.

Most of its populatìon is busy working on farms, fishing at sea, and keeping livestock.

There is a big mosque on Sahel street and also an elementary school.
