= Khoshkrud Rural District =

Khoshkrud Rural District or Khoshk Rud Rural District (Persian: دهستان خشك رود) may refer to:

- Khoshkrud Rural District (Markazi Province)
- Khoshk Rud Rural District (Mazandaran Province)
