= Azizak Rural District =

Rural district in Mazandaran province, Iran

Azizak Rural District Persian: دهستان عزيزك
- Rural District
- Location within Iran
- Coordinates: 36°37′55″N 52°43′28″E
- Country: Iran
- Province: Mazandaran
- County: Babolsar
- District: Bahnemir
- Established: 1992

Population (2016)
  - Total: 4,283
- Time zone: UTC+3:30 (IRST)

Azizak Rural District (Persian: دهستان عزيزك) is in Bahnemir District of Babolsar County, Mazandaran province, Iran.

== Demographics ==
=== Population ===
At the time of the 2006 National Census, the rural district's population was 3,860 in 1,040 households. There were 4,224 inhabitants in 1,280 households at the following census of 2011. The 2016 census measured the population of the rural district as 4,283 in 1,432 households. Its only village was Azizak, with 4,283 people.
