= Khoshk Rud, Babolsar =

Village in Mazandaran province, Iran

Khoshk Rud Persian: خشك رود
- Village
- Location within Iran
- Coordinates: 36°38′08″N 52°34′52″E
- Country: Iran
- Province: Mazandaran
- County: Babolsar
- District: Rudbast
- Rural District: Khoshk Rud

Population (2016)
  - Total: 1,572
- Time zone: UTC+3:30 (IRST)

Khoshk Rud (Persian: خشك رود) (Note: Also romanized as Khoshk Rūd; also known as Khoshkeh Rūd) is a village in, and the capital of, Khoshk Rud Rural District in Rudbast District of Babolsar County, Mazandaran province, Iran.

== Demographics ==
=== Population ===
At the time of the 2006 National Census, the village's population was 1,450 in 368 households. The following census in 2011 counted 1,602 people in 508 households. The 2016 census measured the population of the village as 1,572 people in 522 households. It was the most populous village in its rural district.
