= Gholam-Ali Soleimani =

Iranian entrepreneur

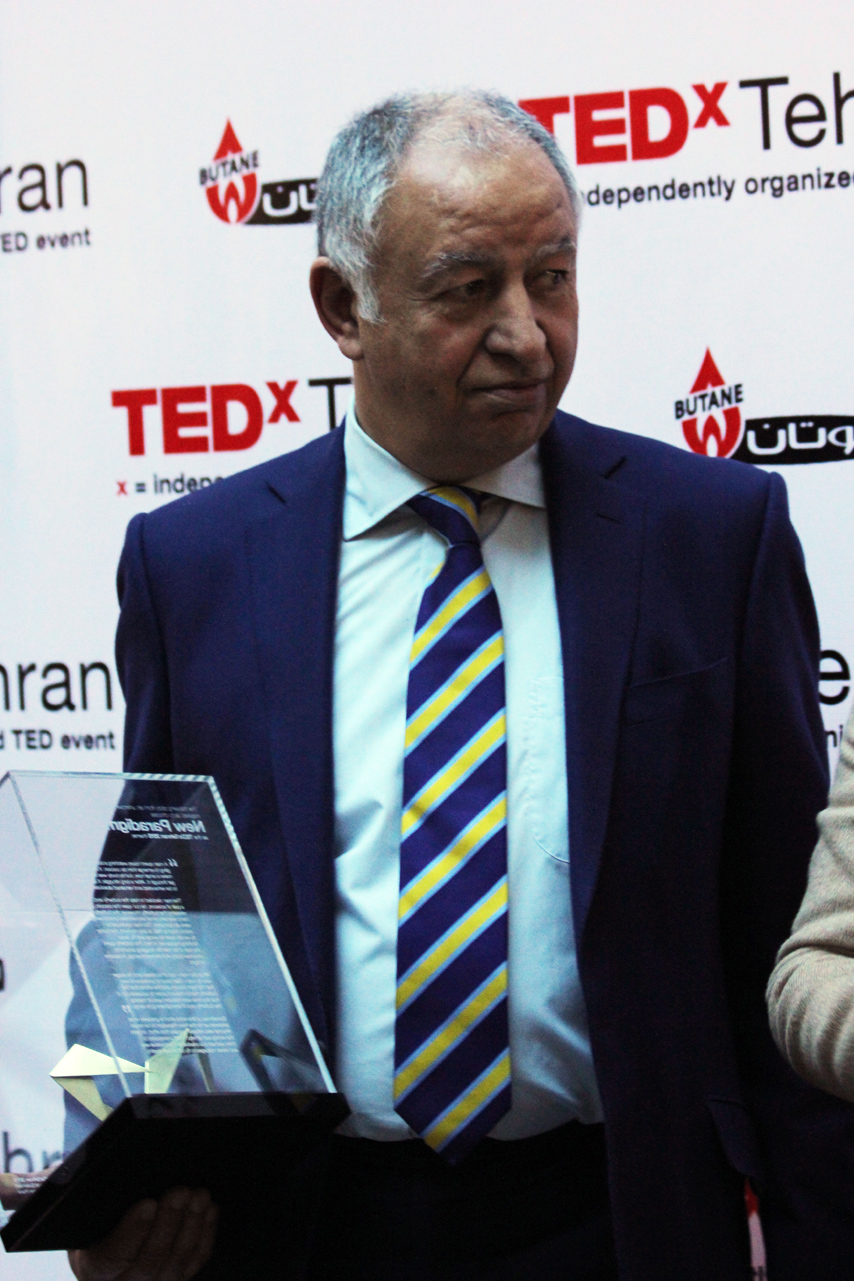
- Born: June 15, 1946 (age 80); Amol, Mazandaran Province, Iran
- Education: Bachelor of Mathematical Physics of Shahid Beheshti University
- Occupations: Founder, Owner, Chairman and CEO Solico Group - Kalleh; Consultant Minister Ministry of Industries and Business Iran
- Years active: 1976-
- Spouse: Sanaz Minaie
- Website: Gholam-Ali Soleimani About

Gholam-Ali Soleimani (Persian: غلامعلی سلیمانی (born 15 June 1946 in Amol) is a businessman, entrepreneur, manager, member of the Iran Chamber of Commerce, Industries, Mines & Agriculture and consultant minister of Ministry of Industries and Business Iran in Iran Development of non-oil exports. He is said to be the father of Iran's modern industry. He is the CEO of the Solico Group, which currently consists of more than 30 company as Kalleh Dairy. In 2015, Soleiman was selected as one of the ten economic elites in the World of Islamic Economy, winning the Muslim World Biz award.
