= Pain Naqib Kola =

Pain Naqib Kola پائين نقيب كلا
- Village
- Location within Iran
- Coordinates: 36°37′41″N 52°37′38″E
- Country: Iran
- Province: Mazandaran
- County: Babolsar
- Bakhsh: Rudbast
- Rural District: Pazevar

Population (2016)
  - Total: 531
- Time zone: UTC+3:30 (IRST)

Pain Naqib Kola (Persian: پائين نقيب كلا, also Romanized as Pā’īn Naqīb Kolā) is a village in Pazevar Rural District, Rudbast District, Babolsar County, Mazandaran Province, Iran.

At the time of the 2006 National Census, the village's population was 528 in 137 households. The following census in 2011 counted 556 people in 163 households. The 2016 census measured the population of the village as 531 people in 188 households.
