= Sanaz Minaie =

Iranian television chef

- Born: Akram Minaie; 1962 (age 63–64); Arak, Iran
- Education: EMBA
- Occupations: Businesswoman, Founder, Entrepreneur
- Spouse: Gholam-Ali Soleimani
- Children: 2
- Culinary career
- Cooking style: Persian/Middle Eastern
- Television show: Sanaz Minaie Show
- Website: sanazsania.ir

Sanaz Minaie (Persian: ساناز مینایی; born 1962) is an Iranian television chef and cookbook author. She hosted the first cooking program in Islamic Republic of Iran Broadcasting, Sobhgahi Program.

== Personal life ==
Sanaz Minaie was born in Arak, and has worked in Tehran since 1981. Her birth name was Akram, which she later changed to Sanaz. She has two daughters.

== Education ==
In 1989, Minaie received the certificates of Confectionary Master and Cooking Master Chef from the Vocational Training Organization.

Minaie attended Le Cordon Bleu in London.

In 2015, Minaie received a PhD in Business Management from Liberty University in the United States.

== Career ==
=== Cooking Institute ===
In 1982, Sanaz Minaie established the first Cooking Institute in Iran. Since 1978, she starts her work by teaching the arts like vegetable and fruit decoration, pastry making, cake decoration and family management. In 1991, developing 14 standards in terms of Cooking, pastry and hospitality under the title of Golden Chef, established the first culinary institute by permission from Iran Technical and Vocational Training Organization. She could get the permission for the establishment of non-profit university in the terms of knowledge and cooking from Ministry of Science, Research and Technology.

Minaie took cooking classes in France, Japan, and the UAE in 1990 and 1991.

=== TV programs ===
Minaie hosted the first cooking program in Islamic Republic of Iran Broadcasting, Sobhgahi Program. She later produced seven DVDs about the history of Iranian food. She has also been involved in the production, performance and propagation of educational DVDs.

In 1995, Minaie appeared in cooking programs on the Aftab Channel, which were broadcast in seven European countries and the United States.

All the income earned was allocated to "Mahak, Society to support children suffering from cancer" (2009) Expert in TV program naming "Dastpokht Khodemani in 2016.

In 2012, Minaie debuted Golden Chef, a standard meant to develop Iranian foods, preparation technology, ingredient quality control, and hospitality skills. The standard aims to develop the Iranian tourism industry, create attractions to promote Iranian culture, and to develop individuals' knowledge in safety and hygiene, environmental issues, and hospitality etiquette.

=== Writing ===
In 1998, Minaie received permission to publish from the Ministry of Culture and Islamic Guidance.

Minaie has published two cooking encyclopedias; the first focuses on cooking techniques, while the second is about Iranian traditional cooking.

In 2007, Minaie and her daughters began publishing SanazSania, a cooking and pastry magazine. Minaie's older daughter, Sanaz Sharifi, is the magazine's chief editor.

Minaie has also published articles on cooking in Javanan Magazine, Etelaat Haftegi weekly magazine, and Danestaniha Magazine.

== Other activities ==
- Expert of forty-second world professional skills Olympiad in the field of cooking and pastry (Germany, 2013)
- Managing and training the hosts in sixteenth Movement of Non-Aligned Summit (Tehran, 2012)
- In charge of preparation and welcoming in sixteenth Movement of Non-Aligned Summit (Tehran, 2012)
- Judge and executive expert of thirteenth national vocational skills Olympiad in the field of cooking and pastry (Iran, 2012)
- One of the four international judges (America, South Korea, France and Iran) in world food festival (South Korea, 2010)
- cooperation in producing and broadcasting the first educational pastry art in Islamic Republic of Iran Broadcasting for 5 years (1993)
- constant and dynamic cooperation with Tehran Municipal Office of Women's Affairs for presenting job creation plans focusing on Iranian ladies
- secretary of first Healthy Diet Congress
- Cooperation in holding international Zeytoon Congress
- Chairman of the Board of Commerce Commission of Entrepreneurial Women's Club
- Consulting, Monitoring, Managing, Training and Promoting the level of Chefs and Stewardess in the field of hospitality and formalities in CIP section of Imam Khomeini International Airport

== Honors ==
- Select judgment in Invention Festival in Tehran and Alborz Provinces (2014)
- Getting Golden Statue Management and National competent director plate from deputy Minister of Industry, Mine and Trade by time, Mrs, Shoeila Jelodarzadeh
- Getting Top Media Statue from Premio Sicilia of Italy (2011)
- Getting eminence in "Vegetables and Fruit Decoration" tournament in Tokyo, Japan, 1986
- Getting first rank in Cooking Festival in France in 1988
- Getting Golden Statue of an Elected Global Assembly as the first and only Iranian lady (Tehran, 1391)
- Getting the title of excellent founder and manager of private institutes from Iran Technical and Vocational Training Organization, 2011 - 2012

== Selected publications ==
- Sanaz Sania; Cooking Encyclopedia (2014), now in 3 volumes
- SanazSania Cooking (2007) in 2 volumes
- All kind of Polo with Easy Cooking (2007)
- Fish and Sea Foods (2006)
- Fantasy Breads (2006)
- Cooking with Gouda Cheese (2006)
- All kind of Toast Sandwiches (2006)
- Sanaz Sania Meat Foods (2005)
- All kind of Ice creams (2005)
- All kind of International Desserts (2005)
- All kind of Traditional Desserts, Jams and Marmalades (2005)
- Vegetable and Fruit Decoration (2005) in 3 volumes
- Vegetable and Food Decoration (2005)
- All kind of Macaroni (pasta, lasagna and spaghetti) (2004)
- All kind of Fish (2004)
- All kind of Chicken and Poultry (2004)
- All kind of Rice and Polo (2004)
- All kind Pizzas (2004)
- All kind of Stews (2004)
- All kind of Sauces (2004)
- All kind of Kebabs (2004)
- All kind of Cakes (2004)
- Sanaz Sania Cooking Book (2003)
- Traditional Cookies and all kind of Chocolates (2002)
- Modern Cookies and all kind of Biscuits (2002)

== Other issue ==
- Observer of Food Olympia in Iran and judge and expert in World Olympia in Germany, 2013
- One of the four world judges (America, South Korea, Iran and France) in World Cooking Festival in South Korea, 2010
- First women in the Global Assembly promoting Iranian Food Culture
- Observing on the hospitality manner of Foreign Affairs Ministry in 2010
- Observer and Manager of Non-Aligned summit in 2012
- Developing 17 Standards for Technical and Vocational Training Organization in 2012
- Gold status of Global Assembly Elected as first and only Iranian lady, Tehran, 2012
- Getting the position of "Founder and Privilege Manager of Private Institutes" from Technical and Vocational Training Organization in 2012
- Executive Judge and Expert for 13th Technical and Vocational National Olympia in the field of Cooking and Confectionary, Iran, 2012
- Holding more than 15 Cooking Competition courses in order to spread Iranian Cuisine among ladies and granting awards like Gold, Silver and Bronze Medals
- Member of Elite Managers Club
- Member of Iranian Experts Assembly

== Courses and Certificates ==
- Certificate in the field of "professional Cake Decoration" from England /Rosalind Miller Wedding Cakes/London/2012
- Certificate in the field of "professional Cake flowers" from England –/ Cakes 4 Fun schools of sugar crafts / London/ 2012
- Certificate in the field of "Art of Chocolate Making" from Arabian United Emirate International Center for Culinary Arts/ Dubai/ 2012
- Certificate in the field of international Cuisine including: Moroccan, Chinese, French, Indian, Japanese, Mediterranean, Greek, Mexican, *Lebanese and Italian Cooking from Arabian United Emirate, International Center for Culinary Arts Dubai / City & Guilds / 2012
- Certificate in the field of "Bread Making" from United States of America, Bates Technical College Tacoma, Washington/ 1995
- Certificate in the field of Food and Drink Management from Technical and Vocational Train Organization, 2011
- Certificate of the International Conference on Change Management, Communications Skills and Inspirational Leadership / Tehran / 2008
- Sicilian Award of Italy for Exquisite Books (2011)
