= Galesh Kola-ye Pain =

Village in Mazandaran province, Iran

Galesh Kola Persian: گالشکلا پایین, گالشكلا
- Village
- Location within Iran
- Coordinates: 36°38′50″N 52°46′39″E
- Country: Iran
- Province: Mazandaran
- County: Babolsar
- District: Bahnemir
- Rural District: Bahnemir

Population (2016)
  - Total: 1,327
- Time zone: UTC+3:30 (IRST)

Galesh Kola (Persian: گالشكلا پايين) (Note: Also romanized as Gālesh Kolā-ye Pā’īn; also known as Pā’īn Gālesh Kolā) also known as Galesh Kola-ye Pain is a village in Bahnemir Rural District of Bahnemir District in Babolsar County, Mazandaran province, Iran.

== Demographics ==
=== Population ===
At the time of the 2006 National Census, the village's population was 891 in 228 households. The following census in 2011 counted 1,363 people in 417 households. The 2016 census measured the population of the village as 1,327 people in 430 households.
