= Pazevar Rural District =

Rural district in Mazandaran province, Iran

Pazevar Rural District Persian: دهستان پازوار
- Rural District
- Location within Iran
- Coordinates: 36°39′N 52°39′E
- Country: Iran
- Province: Mazandaran
- County: Babolsar
- District: Rudbast
- Established: 1995
- Capital: Aysi Kola

Population (2016)
  - Total: 17,282
- Time zone: UTC+3:30 (IRST)

Pazevar Rural District (Persian: دهستان پازوار) is in Rudbast District of Babolsar County, Mazandaran province, Iran. Its capital is the village of Aysi Kola.

== Demographics ==
=== Population ===
At the time of the 2006 National Census, the rural district's population was 17,727 in 4,648 households. There were 18,539 inhabitants in 5,583 households at the following census of 2011. The 2016 census measured the population of the rural district as 17,282 in 5,817 households. The most populous of its 22 villages was Fulad Kola, with 2,095 people.

=== Other villages in the rural district ===
- Armich Kola
- Bala Ahmad Kola
- Bala Naqib Kola
- Chupan Kola
- Darzi Naqib Kola
- Kabutardan
- Kari Kola
- Kasegar Mahalleh
- Khard Mard-e Anisi
- Khard Mard-e Rezai
- Moqri Kola
- Pain Naqib Kola
- Qadi Mahalleh
- Rekun
- Reza Kola
- Said Kola
- Sar Hammam
- Sepah Mahalleh
- Seyyed Mahalleh
