= Kallik, Hamadan =

Kallik كليك
- Village
- Location within Iran
- Coordinates: 35°31′45″N 48°05′42″E
- Country: Iran
- Province: Hamadan
- County: Kabudarahang
- Bakhsh: Gol Tappeh
- Rural District: Mehraban-e Sofla

Population (2006)
  - Total: 383
- Time zone: UTC+3:30 (IRST)
  - Summer (DST): UTC+4:30 (IRDT)

Kallik (Persian: كليك, also Romanized as Kallīk and Kalīk; also known as Kahlak and Kāleh) is a village in Mehraban-e Sofla Rural District, Gol Tappeh District, Kabudarahang County, Hamadan Province, Iran. At the 2006 census, its population was 383, in 88 families.
