= Darzi Mahalleh, Babol =

Darzi Mahalleh درزي محله
- Village
- Location within Iran
- Coordinates: 36°23′37″N 52°42′58″E
- Country: Iran
- Province: Mazandaran
- County: Babol
- Bakhsh: Babol Kenar
- Rural District: Babol Kenar

Population (2006)
  - Total: 405
- Time zone: UTC+3:30 (IRST)
  - Summer (DST): UTC+4:30 (IRDT)

Darzi Mahalleh (Persian: درزي محله, also Romanized as Darzī Maḩalleh) is a village in Babol Kenar Rural District, Babol Kenar District, Babol County, Mazandaran Province, Iran. In the 2006 census, its population was 405 with 104 families.
