= Zahed Kola, Qaem Shahr =

Zahed Kola زاهدكلا
- Village
- Location within Iran
- Coordinates: 36°31′08″N 52°53′29″E
- Country: Iran
- Province: Mazandaran
- County: Qaem Shahr
- Bakhsh: Central
- Rural District: Nowkand Kola

Population (2006)
  - Total: 257
- Time zone: UTC+3:30 (IRST)
  - Summer (DST): UTC+4:30 (IRDT)

Zahed Kola (Persian: زاهدكلا, also Romanized as Zāhed Kolā, Zāhed Kalā, and Zēhed Kolā) is a village in Nowkand Kola Rural District, in the Central District of Qaem Shahr County, Mazandaran Province, Iran. At the 2006 census, its population was 257, in 59 families.
