= Moqri Kola, Babol =

Moqri Kola مقريكلا
- Village
- Location within Iran
- Coordinates: 36°21′41″N 52°34′26″E
- Country: Iran
- Province: Mazandaran
- County: Babol
- Bakhsh: Bandpey-ye Gharbi
- Rural District: Khvosh Rud

Population (2006)
  - Total: 385
- Time zone: UTC+3:30 (IRST)
  - Summer (DST): UTC+4:30 (IRDT)

Moqri Kola Tekiyeh

Moqri Kola (Persian: مقريكلا, also Romanized as Moqrī Kolā, Maqrī Kalā, and Moqrī Kalā; also known as Mokrī Kolā) is a village in Khvosh Rud Rural District, Bandpey-ye Gharbi District, Babol County, Mazandaran Province, Iran. At the 2006 census, its population was 385, in 94 families.
