= Bahnemir Rural District =

Rural district in Mazandaran province, Iran

Bahnemir Rural District Persian: دهستان بهنمير
- Rural District
- Location within Iran
- Coordinates: 36°41′N 52°46′E
- Country: Iran
- Province: Mazandaran
- County: Babolsar
- District: Bahnemir
- Capital: Bahnemir

Population (2016)
  - Total: 11,812
- Time zone: UTC+3:30 (IRST)

Bahnemir Rural District (Persian: دهستان بهنمير) is in Bahnemir District of Babolsar County, Mazandaran province, Iran. It is administered from the city of Bahnemir.

== Demographics ==
=== Population ===
At the time of the 2006 National Census, the rural district's population was 11,394 in 2,923 households. There were 11,650 inhabitants in 3,509 households at the following census of 2011. The 2016 census measured the population of the rural district as 11,812 in 3,957 households. The most populous of its 16 villages was Kaleh, with 1,816 people.

=== Other villages in the rural district ===
- Afratakht
- Arab Kheyl
- Darabdin-e Rowshan
- Eznabad
- Galesh Kola-ye Pain
- Hali Bagh
- Kar Fun
- Karim Kola
- Mangelab
- Mirud Sar
- Naft Chal
- Paru Mahalleh-ye Mangelab
- Rowshandan
- Shahid Sara
- Sorkhdasht
