= Seyyed Mahalleh, Babolsar =

Seyyed Mahalleh سيدمحله
- Village
- Location within Iran
- Coordinates: 36°36′45″N 52°37′23″E
- Country: Iran
- Province: Mazandaran
- County: Babolsar
- Bakhsh: Rudbast
- Rural District: Pazevar

Population (2016)
  - Total: 475
- Time zone: UTC+3:30 (IRST)

Seyyed Mahalleh (Persian: سيدمحله, also Romanized as Seyyed Maḩalleh) is a village in Pazevar Rural District, Rudbast District, Babolsar County, Mazandaran Province, Iran.

At the time of the 2006 National Census, the village's population was 399 people. The following census in 2011 counted 431 people in 137 households. The 2016 census measured the population of the village as 475 people in 150 households.
