= Kalleh Dairy =

Iranian food company

Kalleh
- Type: Private Company
- Industry: Dairy Products, Food processing
- Founded: 1991
- Headquarters: Amol, Iran
- Area served: Iran, Iraq, United States, Germany, United Kingdom, United Arab Emirates, Russia
- Key people: Gholamali Soleimani, CEO
- Products: Dairy products, Food, Drink
- Number of employees: 17,000
- Website: kalleh.com

Kalleh Dairy is an Iranian dairy, food and drink company headquartered in Amol, Iran.

The company was founded by Solico Food Industries in 1991 as an industrial food company. In 2013 it had 26% of the Iranian cheese market. Besides Amol, it also has offices in Tehran, Iraq, United Arab Emirates, United States, Germany, Kuwait, Oman, Saudia, United Kingdom and Russia. Kalleh's products are sold under several names, including Pemina, Seven Yougurt, Jito, Brimond, Sorbonne, Delis, Anna, Pinka, Nari and SevenTen. Kalleh Dairy products are available throughout the country. Kalleh Amol Dairy products factory is one of the largest dairy products factories in the Middle East with receiving over 2,000 tons of milk per day. The Kalleh Group sells about 1,350 tons of products every day.

== Products ==
Kalleh products are highly variable products. So that now more than 160 types of dairy products are marketed.

- Manufacture of kinds of Yogurt and Drink such as: Fresh Yogurt, Yogurt with cream, dripped Yogurt, diet Yogurt, Yoguret Useful for bones and Soft drink, Doogh
- Manufacturer kinds of cheese such as: Firm cheese, semirigid cheese, diet cheese.
- Manufacturer kinds of ice-cream such as: Fruit ice-cream, diet ice-cream, liter & cup ice-cream.
- Manufacturer of milk such as: Milk with less oily & milk with more oily, milk with various tastes.
- Cream: Pour & chocolate & dried whey kinds of dessert (chocolate, saffron, Nesscaffe)

== Brand ==
- Kalleh
- Lactivia
- Majan
- Amol
- Seven
- Bonny Chow
- Anna
- Nari
- Pinka
- Sorbon
- Celino
- Lucky Do
- Promilk

== Export to USA ==
Iran's first dairy product is Kalleh Company’s cheese, this product was officially exported to the United States.
