= Kalleh-ye Nahr Mian =

Village in Markazi, Iran

Kalleh-ye Nahr Mian كله نهرميان
- Village
- Location within Iran
- Coordinates: 34°00′21″N 49°13′32″E
- Country: Iran
- Province: Markazi
- County: Shazand
- Bakhsh: Zalian
- Rural District: Nahr-e Mian

Population (2006)
  - Total: 225
- Time zone: UTC+3:30 (IRST)
  - Summer (DST): UTC+4:30 (IRDT)

Kalleh-ye Nahr Mian (Persian: كله نهرميان, also Romanized as Kalleh-ye Nahr Mīān and Kalleh-ye Nahr Meyān; also known as Kalleh, Kūsa‘lī, Kūseh ‘Alī, Qalachi, and Qal‘eh-ye Nahr Mīān) is a village in Nahr-e Mian Rural District, Zalian District, Shazand County, Markazi Province, Iran. At the 2006 census, its population was 225, in 54 families.
