= Darzi Mahalleh, Gilan =

Darzi Mahalleh درزي محله
- Village
- Location within Iran
- Coordinates: 37°03′01″N 50°16′58″E
- Country: Iran
- Province: Gilan
- County: Rudsar
- Bakhsh: Kelachay
- Rural District: Machian

Population (2006)
  - Total: 136
- Time zone: UTC+3:30 (IRST)
  - Summer (DST): UTC+4:30 (IRDT)

Darzi Mahalleh (Persian: درزي محله, also Romanized as Darzī Maḩalleh) is a village in Machian Rural District, Kelachay District, Rudsar County, Gilan Province, Iran. At the 2006 census, its population was 136, in 41 families.
