= Musa ibn Khalil Mazandarani =

Musā ibn Khalil ibn Taghi ibn Jafar ibn Mohammad Ebrāhim Māzandarāni (Persian: موسی بن خلیل بن تقی بن جعفر بن محمد ابراهیم مازندرانی), Persian scribe and scholar of nineteenth century Persia. Musa was born into a family of good standing which originated in the northern Iranian region of Mazandaran.

== History ==
As far as is known, he lived and worked in the city of Lahijan where already his father had lived. He mentions the city as his place of residence in his work signing beside his name "resident of Lahijan" (Persian: ساكن لاهیجان) while using "Māzandarāni" as a reference to his region of origin according to common Persian practice in 19th century.

Lahijan, a town of the Iranian province Gilan bordering Mazandaran, birthplace of the Iranian Buyid dynasty and home to Zahed Gilani, the 13th century spiritual master of the eponymous ancestor of the Safavid dynasty Safi-ad-din Ardabili, was one of the oldest towns of the region with a long and vivid intellectual life.

== Manuscripts ==
According to the Iranian Books and Manuscripts Data Bank, there are two original manuscripts by Musa ibn Khalil Mazandarani:

- "Nān va Halvā" (Persian: نان وحلوا, "Bread and Halva", dated 1286 AH, i. e. 1869 AD) by Shaikh Bahai, Muhammad Baha' al-Din Amili (1546-1622), whose writings, i. a. his "Anatomy of the Heavens" ("Tashrih Al-Aflāk", Persian & Arabic: تشریح الافلاک) on astronomy where he supports a heliocentric model, have been object of further studies. "Nān va Halvā" contains allegorical poems in Masnavi style treating a scope of topics such as human behaviour, morality and social structure and containing satirical elements.
- „Hedāyat ol Mo'menin elal Hagh al Mobin“ (Persian & Arabic: هداية المومنين الي الحق المبين-في معرفة اصول الدين) by Morteza ibn Abdolvahab Hosseini Lahiji on principles of religion, dated 1869 (1286 AH).
