= Kalleh, Lorestan =

Kalleh كله
- Village
- Location within Iran
- Coordinates: 33°57′09″N 48°57′43″E
- Country: Iran
- Province: Lorestan
- County: Borujerd
- Bakhsh: Central
- Rural District: Darreh Seydi

Population (2006)
  - Total: 130
- Time zone: UTC+3:30 (IRST)
  - Summer (DST): UTC+4:30 (IRDT)

Kalleh (Persian: كله) is a village in Darreh Seydi Rural District, in the Central District of Borujerd County, Lorestan Province, Iran. At the 2006 census, its population was 130, in 28 families.
