= Kasegar Mahalleh, Babolsar =

Village in Mazandaran province, Iran

Kasegar Mahalleh Persian: كاسگرمحله
- Village
- Location within Iran
- Coordinates: 36°37′17″N 52°38′47″E
- Country: Iran
- Province: Mazandaran
- County: Babolsar
- District: Rudbast
- Rural District: Pazevar

Population (2016)
  - Total: 1,527
- Time zone: UTC+3:30 (IRST)

Kasegar Mahalleh (Persian: كاسگرمحله) (Note: Also romanized as Kās Gar Maḩalleh and Kāsegar Maḩalleh; also known as Kasegar Kola (كاسگر كلا), also romanized as Kāsegar Kolā) is a village in Pazevar Rural District of Rudbast District in Babolsar County, Mazandaran province, Iran.

== Demographics ==
=== Population ===
At the time of the 2006 National Census, the village's population was 1,525 in 408 households. The following census in 2011 counted 1,670 people in 506 households. The 2016 census measured the population of the village as 1,527 people in 512 households.
