= Bahnemir =

City in Mazandaran province, Iran

Bahnemir Persian: بهنمير
- City
- Location within Iran
- Coordinates: 36°40′02″N 52°45′45″E
- Country: Iran
- Province: Mazandaran
- County: Babolsar
- District: Bahnemir

Population (2016)
  - Total: 7,906
- Time zone: UTC+3:30 (IRST)
- Website: www.bahnamir.ir

Bahnemir (Persian: بهنمير) (Note: Also romanized as Bahnamir, Bahnemīr, and Beh Namīr) is a city in, and the capital of, Bahnemir District in Babolsar County, Mazandaran province, Iran. It also serves as the administrative center for Bahnemir Rural District.

== Demographics ==
=== Population ===
At the time of the 2006 National Census, the city's population was 6,836 in 1,813 households. The following census in 2011 counted 7,410 people in 2,232 households. The 2016 census measured the population of the city as 7,906 people in 2,541 households.
