= Khoshkrud, Tonekabon =

Khoshkrud خشكرود
- Village
- Location within Iran
- Coordinates: 36°48′05″N 50°46′42″E
- Country: Iran
- Province: Mazandaran
- County: Tonekabon
- Bakhsh: Central
- Rural District: Goli Jan

Population (2006)
  - Total: 543
- Time zone: UTC+3:30 (IRST)
  - Summer (DST): UTC+4:30 (IRDT)

Khoshkrud (Persian: خشكرود, also Romanized as Khoshkrūd; also known as Pā’īn Khoshkeh Rūd) is a village in Goli Jan Rural District, in the Central District of Tonekabon County, Mazandaran Province, Iran. At the 2006 census, its population was 543, in 177 families.
