= Khoshk Rud Rural District (Babolsar County) =

Rural district in Mazandaran province, Iran

Khoshk Rud Rural District Persian: دهستان خشكرود
- Rural District
- Location within Iran
- Coordinates: 36°39′N 52°36′E
- Country: Iran
- Province: Mazandaran
- County: Babolsar
- District: Rudbast
- Established: 1995
- Capital: Khoshk Rud

Government
  - Haj: Muhammadrazi Khosravani

Population (2016)
  - Total: 5,458
- Time zone: UTC+3:30 (IRST)
- Postal code: 4746143111
- Area code: 113522

Khoshk Rud Rural District (Persian: دهستان خشكرود) is in Rudbast District of Babolsar County, Mazandaran province, Iran. Its capital is the village of Khoshk Rud. Most of the residents are farmers and work in rice fields.

== Demographics ==
=== Religion ===
Virtually all of the people living in this area are Shia Muslims.

=== Population ===
At the time of the 2006 National Census, the rural district's population was 5,974 in 1,507 households. There were 6,352 inhabitants in 1,934 households at the following census of 2011. The 2016 census measured the population of the rural district as 5,458 in 1,826 households. The most populous of its 10 villages was Khoshk Rud, with 1,572 people.

=== Other villages in the rural district ===
- Darzi Mahalleh
- Dughi Kola
- Esfandiar Mahalleh
- Kikha Mahalleh
- Kuner
- Mian Bal
- Nosrat Kola
- Raz Kenar
- Sharmeh Kola
- Valik Rudposht
