= Khoshkeh Rud, Zanjan =

Village in Zanjan province, Iran

Khoshkeh Rud Persian: خشكه رود
- Village
- Location within Iran
- Coordinates: 36°48′28″N 48°31′57″E
- Country: Iran
- Province: Zanjan
- County: Zanjan
- District: Central
- Rural District: Taham

Population (2016)
  - Total: 169
- Time zone: UTC+3:30 (IRST)

Khoshkeh Rud (Persian: خشكه رود) (Note: Also romanized as Khoshkeh Rūd; also known as Khoshg Rūd, Khoshkrūd, Khūshārūd, and Khushkyary) is a village in Taham Rural District of the Central District in Zanjan County, Zanjan province, Iran.

== Demographics ==
=== Population ===
At the time of the 2006 National Census, the village's population was 199 in 52 households. The following census in 2011 counted 210 people in 59 households. The 2016 census measured the population of the village as 169 people in 56 households.
