= Sianab-e Parab =

Sianab-e Parab سياناب پرآب
- Village
- Location within Iran
- Coordinates: 34°58′00″N 46°01′00″E
- Country: Iran
- Province: Kermanshah
- County: Salas-e Babajani
- Bakhsh: Central
- Rural District: Khaneh Shur

Population (2006)
  - Total: 196
- Time zone: UTC+3:30 (IRST)
  - Summer (DST): UTC+4:30 (IRDT)

Sianab-e Parab (Persian: سياناب پرآب, also Romanized as Sīānāb-e Pārāb; also known as Seteh and Sūteh) is a village in Khaneh Shur Rural District, in the Central District of Salas-e Babajani County, Kermanshah Province, Iran. At the 2006 census, its population was 196, in 44 families.
