= Khoshkeh Rud, Lorestan =

Khoshkeh Rud خشكه رود
- Village
- Location within Iran
- Coordinates: 33°44′05″N 48°29′13″E
- Country: Iran
- Province: Lorestan
- County: Khorramabad
- Bakhsh: Bayravand
- Rural District: Beyranvand-e Shomali

Population (2006)
  - Total: 102
- Time zone: UTC+3:30 (IRST)
  - Summer (DST): UTC+4:30 (IRDT)

Khoshkeh Rud (Persian: خشكه رود, also Romanized as Khoshkeh Rūd; also known as Khoshk Rūd, Rūd Khoshkeh, and Rūd-e Khoshk) is a village in Beyranvand-e Shomali Rural District, Bayravand District, Khorramabad County, Lorestan Province, Iran. At the 2006 census, its population was 102, in 23 families.
