= Khoshk Rud, Kerman =

Khoshk Rud خشك رود
- Village
- Location within Iran
- Coordinates: 29°19′18″N 57°09′09″E
- Country: Iran
- Province: Kerman
- County: Rabor
- Bakhsh: Hanza
- Rural District: Hanza

Population (2006)
  - Total: 388
- Time zone: UTC+3:30 (IRST)
  - Summer (DST): UTC+4:30 (IRDT)

Khoshk Rud (Persian: خشك رود, also Romanized as Khoshk Rūd; also known as Khoshkeh Rūd) is a village in Hanza Rural District, Hanza District, Rabor County, Kerman Province, Iran. At the 2006 census, its population was 388, in 86 families.
