= Hadishahr, Babolsar =

City in Mazandaran province, Iran

Hadishahr Persian: هادی‌شهر
- City
- Location within Iran
- Coordinates: 36°38′26″N 52°37′48″E
- Country: Iran
- Province: Mazandaran
- County: Babolsar
- District: Rudbast
- Established as a city: 2000

Population (2016)
  - Total: 7,889
- Time zone: UTC+3:30 (IRST)

Hadishahr (Persian: هادی‌شهر) (Note: Formerly Kalehbast (كله بست), also romanized as Kaleh Bast or Kalleh Bast) is a city in, and the capital of, Rudbast District in Babolsar County, Mazandaran province, Iran. The village of Kalleh Bast was converted to a city in 2000 and renamed Hadishahr in 2012.

== Demographics ==
=== Population ===
At the time of the 2006 National Census, the population (as the city of Kalleh Bast) was 3,543 in 965 households. The following census in 2011 counted 4,097 people in 1,264 households. The 2016 census measured the population of the city as 7,889 people in 2,549 households.
