= Fereydunkenar =

City in Mazandaran province, Iran

Fereydunkenar Persian: فریدونکنار
- City
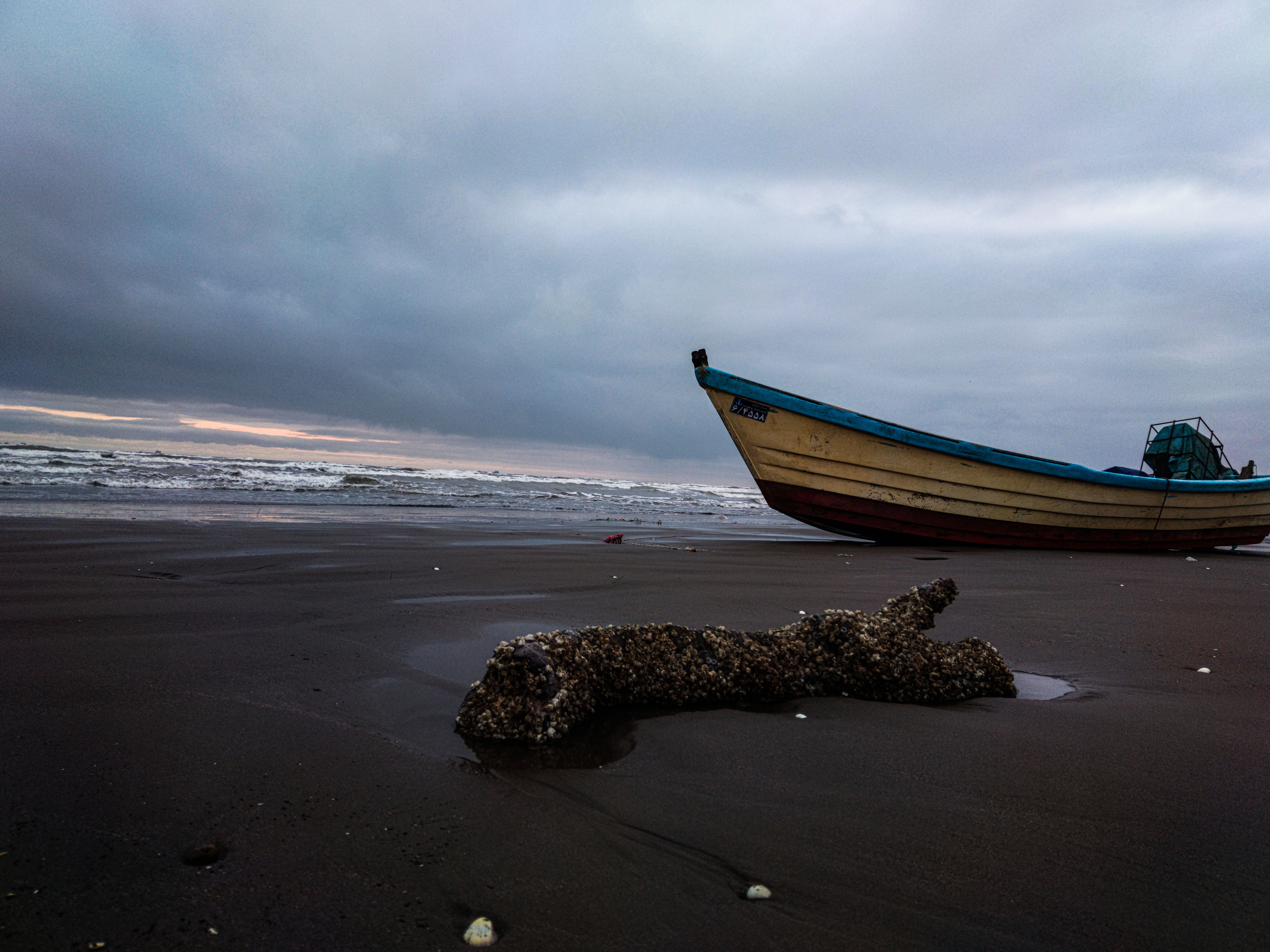
- The beach at Fereydunkenar is available to traditional fishermen

- Location within Iran
- Coordinates: 36°41′06″N 52°31′15″E
- Country: Iran
- Province: Mazandaran
- County: Fereydunkenar
- District: Central

Population (2016)
  - Total: 38,154
- Time zone: UTC+3:30 (IRST)
- Website: www.fereydoonkenar.ir

Fereydunkenar (Persian: فریدونکنار) (Note: Also romanized as Fereidun Kenar, Fereydūn Kenār, and Fereydūnkenār; also known as Fāridūn Kinār and Qaşabeh) is a city in the Central District of Fereydunkenar County, Mazandaran province, Iran, serving as capital of both the county and the district.

== Demographics ==
=== Population ===
At the time of the 2006 National Census, the city's population was 34,452 in 9,278 households, when it was capital of the former Fereydunkenar District in Babolsar County. The following census in 2011 counted 36,192 people in 10,922 households, by which time the district had been separated from the county in the establishment of Fereydunkenar County. Fereydunkenar was transferred to the new Central District as the county's capital. The 2016 census measured the population of the city as 38,154 people in 12,606 households.

== Illegal bird hunting ==
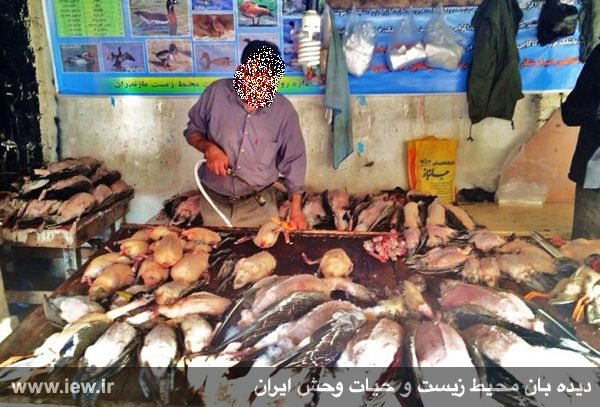
Migratory Birds Market in Fereydunkenar

Fereydunkenar is known as an important wintering site for migratory waterbirds, including endangered species such as the Siberian crane. However, the region has been a hotspot for illegal bird hunting, which has raised concerns among conservationists and environmental organizations.

Traditional bird trapping practices, such as the use of mist nets and decoys, have been criticized for their impact on migratory birds, particularly in the context of the Fereydunkenar and Sorkhrud Wetland Complex, a key stopover for waterfowl along the Central Asian flyway.

Despite official efforts to regulate hunting activities, illegal bird hunting persists in the area. In 2018, the Department of Environment of Mazandaran Province announced strict enforcement measures to prevent violations. Nevertheless, reports indicate that thousands of migratory birds are still poached annually in Fereydunkenar and surrounding wetlands, posing a threat to biodiversity in the region.

== Climate ==
Fereydunkenar has a hot-summer Mediterranean climate (Csa) according to the Köppen climate classification.

Climate data for Fereydunkenar
Month	Jan	Feb	Mar	Apr	May	Jun	Jul	Aug	Sep	Oct	Nov	Dec	Year
Mean daily maximum °C (°F)	11.8 (53.2)	11.7 (53.1)	13.8 (56.8)	18.7 (65.7)	24.0 (75.2)	28.3 (82.9)	30.9 (87.6)	30.6 (87.1)	28.0 (82.4)	23.2 (73.8)	18.6 (65.5)	14.3 (57.7)	21.2 (70.1)
Daily mean °C (°F)	7.7 (45.9)	7.9 (46.2)	10.3 (50.5)	14.9 (58.8)	20.0 (68.0)	24.3 (75.7)	26.8 (80.2)	26.5 (79.7)	23.8 (74.8)	18.8 (65.8)	14.2 (57.6)	9.9 (49.8)	17.1 (62.7)
Mean daily minimum °C (°F)	3.6 (38.5)	4.2 (39.6)	6.9 (44.4)	11.1 (52.0)	16.1 (61.0)	20.4 (68.7)	22.7 (72.9)	22.4 (72.3)	19.6 (67.3)	14.4 (57.9)	9.9 (49.8)	5.6 (42.1)	13.1 (55.5)
Average precipitation mm (inches)	91.0 (3.58)	64.4 (2.54)	65.0 (2.56)	30.9 (1.22)	19.4 (0.76)	20.5 (0.81)	24.0 (0.94)	58.3 (2.30)	80.5 (3.17)	158.8 (6.25)	115.4 (4.54)	124.1 (4.89)	852.3 (33.56)
Average precipitation days	10.4	9.4	11.3	8.2	6.4	4.6	4.6	7.4	7.4	8.8	8.9	10.4	97.8
Average relative humidity (%)	84.9	83.5	83.3	80.9	77.9	74.9	75.9	77.8	79.5	81.7	84	85.7	80.8
Average dew point °C (°F)	5.3 (41.5)	5.3 (41.5)	7.6 (45.7)	11.6 (52.9)	16.0 (60.8)	19.6 (67.3)	22.2 (72.0)	22.3 (72.1)	20.0 (68.0)	15.6 (60.1)	11.5 (52.7)	7.6 (45.7)	13.7 (56.7)
Mean monthly sunshine hours	139.5	132.8	139.5	174	227.5	264	260.4	226.3	201	179.8	153	136.4	2,234.2
Mean daily sunshine hours	4.5	4.7	4.5	5.8	7.5	8.8	8.4	7.3	6.7	5.8	5.1	4.4	6.1
Percentage possible sunshine	41.1	40	34.9	41.8	49.7	56.3	54.4	50.5	49.9	47.2	45.6	41.4	46.1
Source: Weatherbase, Weather2visit
