= Amirkola =

City in Mazandaran province, Iran

Amirkola Persian: اميركلا
- City
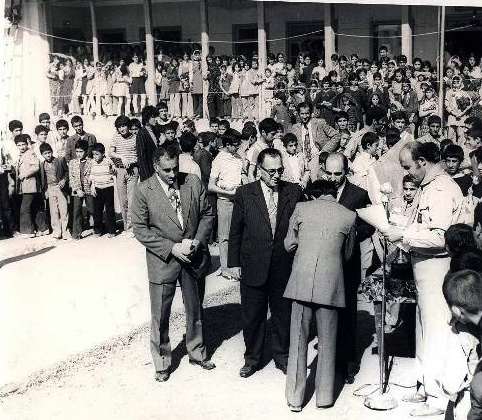
- Amirkola. 1972. School ceremony with dignitaries and a representative of Iran Scout Organization

- Location within Iran
- Coordinates: 36°36′07″N 52°39′48″E
- Country: Iran
- Province: Mazandaran
- County: Babol
- District: Central

Population (2016)
  - Total: 30,478
- Time zone: UTC+3:30 (IRST)

Amirkola (Persian: اميركلا) (Note: Also romanized as Amīr Kolā, Amīrkalā, and Amirkela; also known as Amir Qal‘en) is a city in the Central District of Babol County, Mazandaran province, Iran.

== Demographics ==
=== Population ===
At the time of the 2006 National Census, the city's population was 25,186 in 6,923 households. The following census in 2011 counted 28,086 people in 8,633 households. The 2016 census measured the population of the city as 30,478 people in 10,120 households.

Amirkola consists of neighborhoods, one of them is Molla Mahalleh.

== Notable people ==
Famous people from the town include the Safavid era poet Amir Pazevari and the Ayatollahs Ali Asghar Mazandarani (1826–1911) and Mohammad Mehdi Emami Mazandarani (1879-1958).

== Historic places ==
Two historic places are an old public bath (Hammam), built by Haj Molla Khalil Mazandarani of the Khalili Amiri family, early 19th century, and the Chehelsotoon complex, both in the old district of the city.
