= Central District (Fereydunkenar County) =

District in Mazandaran province, Iran

Central District (Fereydunkenar County) Persian: بخش مرکزی شهرستان فریدونکنار
- District
- Location within Iran
- Coordinates: 36°39′N 52°33′E
- Country: Iran
- Province: Mazandaran
- County: Fereydunkenar
- Established: 2007
- Capital: Fereydunkenar

Population (2016)
  - Total: 46,703
- Time zone: UTC+3:30 (IRST)

The Central District of Fereydunkenar County (Persian: بخش مرکزی شهرستان فریدونکنار) is in Mazandaran province, Iran. Its capital is the city of Fereydunkenar.

== History ==
In 2007, Fereydunkenar District was separated from Babolsar County in the establishment of Fereydunkenar County, which was divided into two districts of two rural districts each, with Fereydunkenar as its capital and only city at the time.

== Demographics ==
=== Population ===
At the time of the 2011 National Census, the district's population was 44,814 people in 13,550 households. The 2016 census measured the population of the district as 46,703 inhabitants in 15,536 households.

=== Administrative divisions ===
Central District (Fereydunkenar County) Population
Administrative Divisions	2011	2016
Barik Rud-e Jonubi RD	4,708	4,558
Barik Rud-e Shomali RD (Note: Formerly Barik Rud Rural District)	3,914	3,991
Fereydunkenar (city)	36,192	38,154
Total	44,814	46,703
RD = Rural District
