= Dehferi District =

District in Mazandaran province, Iran

Dehferi District Persian: بخش دهفری
- District
- Location within Iran
- Coordinates: 36°39′N 52°31′E
- Country: Iran
- Province: Mazandaran
- County: Fereydunkenar
- Established: 2007
- Capital: Kardegar Mahalleh

Population (2016)
  - Total: 13,328
- Time zone: UTC+3:30 (IRST)

Dehferi District (Persian: بخش دهفری) is in Fereydunkenar County, Mazandaran province, Iran. Its capital is the village of Kardegar Mahalleh.

== History ==
In 2007, Fereydunkenar District was separated from Babolsar County in the establishment of Fereydunkenar County, which was divided into two districts of two rural districts each, with Fereydunkenar as its capital and only city at the time. The village of Astaneh-ye Sara was converted to a city in 2022.

== Demographics ==
=== Population ===
At the time of the 2011 National Census, the district's population was 13,166 people in 4,030 households. The 2016 census measured the population of the district as 13,328 inhabitants in 4,530 households.

=== Administrative divisions ===
Dehferi District Population
Administrative Divisions	2011	2016
Emamzadeh Abdollah-ye Jonubi RD (Note: Formerly Emamzadeh Abdollah Rural District)	6,566	6,568
Emamzadeh Abdollah-ye Shomali RD	6,600	6,760
Astaneh-ye Sara (city) (Note: Became a city after the 2016 census)		
Total	13,166	13,328
RD = Rural District
