= Emamzadeh Abdollah-ye Jonubi Rural District =

Rural district in Mazandaran province, Iran

Emamzadeh Abdollah-ye Jonubi Rural District Persian: دهستان امامزاده عبدالله جنوبی
- Rural District
- Location within Iran
- Coordinates: 36°37′N 52°30′E
- Country: Iran
- Province: Mazandaran
- County: Fereydunkenar
- District: Dehferi
- Established: 1989
- Capital: Kuchek Bisheh-ye Mahalleh

Population (2016)
  - Total: 6,568
- Time zone: UTC+3:30 (IRST)

Emamzadeh Abdollah-ye Jonubi Rural District (Persian: دهستان امامزاده عبدالله جنوبی) (Note: Formerly Emamzadeh Abdollah Rural District (دهستان امامزاده عبدالله)) is in Dehferi District of Fereydunkenar County, Mazandaran province, Iran. Its capital is the village of Kuchek Bisheh-ye Mahalleh. The previous capital of the rural district was the village of Kardegar Mahalleh, now a neighborhood in the city of Astaneh-ye Sara.

== Demographics ==
=== Population ===
At the time of the 2006 National Census, the rural district's population (as Emamzadeh Abdollah Rural District of the former Fereydunkenar District in Babolsar County) was 17,097 in 4,494 households. There were 6,566 inhabitants in 2,031 households at the census of 2011, by which time the district had been separated from the county in the establishment of Fereydunkenar County. The rural district was transferred to the new Dehferi District and renamed Emamzadeh Abdollah-ye Jonubi Rural District. The 2016 census measured the population of the rural district as 6,568 in 2,251 households. The most populous of its five villages was Kardegar Mahalleh (now a neighborhood in the city of Astaneh-ye Sara), with 2,465 people.

=== Other villages in the rural district ===
- Navai Mahalleh
- Pain Navai Mahalleh
