= Bahnemir District =

District in Mazandaran province, Iran

Bahnemir District Persian: بخش بهنمیر
- District
- Location within Iran
- Coordinates: 36°41′N 52°46′E
- Country: Iran
- Province: Mazandaran
- County: Babolsar
- Established: 1995
- Capital: Bahnemir

Population (2016)
  - Total: 24,001
- Time zone: UTC+3:30 (IRST)

Bahnemir District (Persian: بخش بهنمیر) is in Babolsar County, Mazandaran province, Iran. Its capital is the city of Bahnemir.

== Demographics ==
=== Population ===
At the time of the 2006 National Census, the district's population was 22,090 in 5,776 households. The following census in 2011 counted 23,284 people in 7,021 households. The 2016 census measured the population of the district as 24,001 inhabitants in 7,930 households.

=== Administrative divisions ===
Bahnemir District Population
Administrative Divisions	2006	2011	2016
Azizak RD	3,860	4,224	4,283
Bahnemir RD	11,394	11,650	11,812
Bahnemir (city)	6,836	7,410	7,906
Total	22,090	23,284	24,001
RD = Rural District
