= Fereydunkenar County =

County in Mazandaran province, Iran

Fereydunkenar County Persian: شهرستان فریدونکنار
- County
- Location of Fereydunkenar County in Mazandaran province (top center, pink)

- Location of Mazandaran province in Iran
- Coordinates: 36°39′N 52°33′E
- Country: Iran
- Province: Mazandaran
- Established: 2007
- Capital: Fereydunkenar
- Districts: Central, Dehferi

Population (2016)
  - Total: 60,031
- Time zone: UTC+3:30 (IRST)

Fereydunkenar County (Persian: شهرستان فریدونکنار) is in Mazandaran province, Iran. Its capital is the city of Fereydunkenar.

== History ==
In 2007, Fereydunkenar District was separated from Babolsar County in the establishment of Fereydunkenar County, which was divided into two districts of two rural districts each, with Fereydunkenar as its capital and only city at the time. The village of Astaneh-ye Sara was converted to a city in 2022.

== Demographics ==
=== Population ===
At the time of the 2011 National Census, the county's population was 57,980 people in 17,574 households. The 2016 census measured the population of the county as 60,031 in 20,066 households.

=== Administrative divisions ===
Fereydunkenar County's population history and administrative structure over two consecutive censuses are shown in the following table.

Fereydunkenar County Population
Administrative Divisions	2011	2016
Central District	44,814	46,703
Barik Rud-e Jonubi RD	4,708	4,558
Barik Rud-e Shomali RD (Note: Formerly Barik Rud Rural District)	3,914	3,991
Astaneh-ye Sara (city) (Note: Became a city after the 2016 census)		
Fereydunkenar (city)	36,192	38,154
Dehferi District	13,166	13,328
Emamzadeh Abdollah-ye Jonubi RD (Note: Formerly Emamzadeh Abdollah Rural District)	6,566	6,568
Emamzadeh Abdollah-ye Shomali RD	6,600	6,760
Total	57,980	60,031
RD = Rural District

== See also ==
Media related to Fereydunkenar County at Wikimedia Commons
