= Fereydunkenar District =

Former district in Mazandaran province, Iran

Fereydunkenar District Persian: بخش فریدونکنار
- Former District
- Location within Iran
- Coordinates: 36°39′N 52°33′E
- Country: Iran
- Province: Mazandaran
- County: Babolsar
- Established: 1989
- Capital: Fereydunkenar

Population (2006)
  - Total: 56,055
- Time zone: UTC+3:30 (IRST)

Fereydunkenar District (Persian: بخش فریدونکنار) is a former administrative division of Babolsar County, Mazandaran province, Iran. Its capital was the city of Fereydunkenar.

== History ==
In 2007, the district was separated from the county in the establishment of Fereydunkenar County.

== Demographics ==
=== Population ===
At the time of the 2006 census, the district's population was 56,055 in 15,049 households.

=== Administrative divisions ===
Fereydunkenar District Population
Administrative Divisions	2006
Barik Rud RD (Note: Renamed Barik Rud-e Shomali Rural District)	4,506
Emamzadeh Abdollah RD (Note: Renamed Emamzadeh Abdollah-ye Jonubi Rural District)	17,097
Fereydunkenar (city)	34,452
Total	56,055
RD = Rural District
