= Rudbast District =

District in Mazandaran province, Iran

Rudbast District Persian: بخش رودبست
- District
- Location within Iran
- Coordinates: 36°39′N 52°38′E
- Country: Iran
- Province: Mazandaran
- County: Babolsar
- Established: 1995
- Capital: Hadishahr

Population (2016)
  - Total: 30,629
- Time zone: UTC+3:30 (IRST)

Rudbast District (Persian: بخش رودبست) is in Babolsar County, Mazandaran province, Iran. Its capital is the city of Hadishahr. (Note: Formerly Kalleh Bast)

== Demographics ==
=== Population ===
At the time of the 2006 National Census, the district's population was 27,244 in 7,120 households. The following census in 2011 counted 28,988 people in 8,781 households. The 2016 census measured the population of the district as 30,629 inhabitants in 10,192 households.

=== Administrative divisions ===
Rudbast District Population
Administrative Divisions	2006	2011	2016
Khoshk Rud RD	5,974	6,352	5,458
Pazevar RD	17,727	18,539	17,282
Hadishahr (city)	3,543	4,097	7,889
Total	27,244	28,988	30,629
RD = Rural District
