= Babolsar County =

County in Mazandaran province, Iran

Babolsar County Persian: شهرستان بابلسر
- County
- Location of Babolsar County in Mazandaran province (top center, green)

- Location of Mazandaran province in Iran
- Coordinates: 36°41′N 52°43′E
- Country: Iran
- Province: Mazandaran
- Established: 1989
- Capital: Babolsar
- Districts: Central, Bahnemir, Rudbast

Area
  - Total: 345.70 km^{2} (133.48 sq mi)

Population (2016)
  - Total: 135,191
  - Density: 391.06/km^{2} (1,012.9/sq mi)
- Time zone: UTC+3:30 (IRST)

Babolsar County (Persian: شهرستان بابلسر) is in Mazandaran province, Iran, on the Caspian Sea. Its capital is the city of Babolsar.

== History ==
In 2007, Fereydunkenar District was separated from the county in the establishment of Fereydunkenar County.

== Demographics ==
=== Population ===
At the time of the 2006 census, the county's population was 172,600 in 46,595 households. The following census in 2011 counted 124,323 people in 37,838 households. The 2016 census measured the population of the county as 135,191 in 44,482 households.

=== Administrative divisions ===
Babolsar County's population history and administrative structure over three consecutive censuses are shown in the following table.

Babolsar County Population
Administrative Divisions	2006	2011	2016
Central District	67,211	72,046	80,561
Babolrud RD	11,644	13,178	11,244
Saheli RD	7,695	8,391	9,351
Babolsar (city)	47,872	50,477	59,966
Bahnemir District	22,090	23,284	24,001
Azizak RD	3,860	4,224	4,283
Bahnemir RD	11,394	11,650	11,812
Bahnemir (city)	6,836	7,410	7,906
Fereydunkenar District (Note: Transferred to Fereydunkenar County)	56,055		
Barik Rud RD (Note: Renamed Barik Rud-e Shomali Rural District)	4,506		
Emamzadeh Abdollah RD (Note: Renamed Emamzadeh Abdollah-ye Jonubi Rural District)	17,097		
Fereydunkenar (city)	34,452		
Rudbast District	27,244	28,988	30,629
Khoshk Rud RD	5,974	6,352	5,458
Pazevar RD	17,727	18,539	17,282
Hadishahr (city) (Note: Formerly Kalleh Bast)	3,543	4,097	7,889
Total	172,600	124,323	135,191
RD = Rural District

== See also ==
Media related to Babolsar County at Wikimedia Commons
