= Kharzar =

Kharzar (Persian: خارزار) may refer to:

- Khar Zar, Afghanistan
- Kharzar, Lorestan, Iran
- Kharzar, Fariman, Razavi Khorasan Province, Iran
- Kharzar, Mashhad, Razavi Khorasan Province, Iran
