= Miandasht =

Miandasht or Miyandasht or Mian Dasht (Persian: مياندشت) may refer to:

- Buin va Miandasht, a city in Isfahan Province, Iran
- Mian Dasht, Bushehr, a village in Bushehr Province, Iran
- Mian Dasht, Mazandaran, a neighborhood in Babolsar city, Mazandaran Province, Iran
- Mian Dasht, Razavi Khorasan, a village in Razavi Khorasan Province, Iran
- Miyandasht Rural District (disambiguation), various places in Iran
