= Shurak =

Shurak (Persian: شورك) may refer to:

- Shurak-e Vosta, a village in Kuhbanan County, Kerman Province, Iran
- Shurak, Mazandaran, a village in Babolsar County, Mazandaran Province, Iran
- Shurak, North Khorasan, a village in Maneh and Samalqan County, North Khorasan Province, Iran
- Shurak-e Bala, a village in Jajrom County, North Khorasan Province, Iran
- Shurak, Razavi Khorasan, a village in Chenaran County, Razavi Khorasan Province, Iran
- Shurak-e Maleki, a village in Mashhad County, Razavi Khorasan Province, Iran
- Shurak, Khash, a village in Khash County, Sistan and Baluchestan Province, Iran
- Shurak, Nehbandan, a village in Nehbandan County, South Khorasan Province, Iran
- Shurak, Shusef, a village in Nehbandan County, South Khorasan Province, Iran

== See also ==
- Shurek (disambiguation)
