= Pas Khvori =

Pas Khvori پسخوري
- Village
- Location within Iran
- Coordinates: 35°56′44″N 60°22′09″E
- Country: Iran
- Province: Razavi Khorasan
- County: Mashhad
- Bakhsh: Razaviyeh
- Rural District: Pain Velayat

Population (2006)
  - Total: 161
- Time zone: UTC+3:30 (IRST)
  - Summer (DST): UTC+4:30 (IRDT)

Pas Khvori (Persian: پسخوري, also Romanized as Pas Khvorī, Paskhorī, and Pas Khūrī) is a village in Pain Velayat Rural District, Razaviyeh District, Mashhad County, Razavi Khorasan Province, Iran. At the 2006 census, its population was 161, in 43 families.
