= Baz Howz =

Baz Howz (Persian: بازحوض) may refer to:

- Baz Howz-e Olya
- Baz Howz-e Sofla
