= Mir Bankesh =

Mir Bankesh ميربنكش
- Village
- Location within Iran
- Coordinates: 36°12′45″N 59°50′35″E
- Country: Iran
- Province: Razavi Khorasan
- County: Mashhad
- Bakhsh: Razaviyeh
- Rural District: Meyami

Population (2006)
  - Total: 276
- Time zone: UTC+3:30 (IRST)
  - Summer (DST): UTC+4:30 (IRDT)

Mir Bankesh (Persian: ميربنكش, also Romanized as Mīr Bankesh and Mīr Bangesh; also known as Mīr Nabgesh) is a village in Meyami Rural District, Razaviyeh District, Mashhad County, Razavi Khorasan Province, Iran. At the 2006 census, its population was 276, in 63 families.
