= Qaleh Pokhtuk =

Qaleh Pokhtuk قلعه پختوك
- Village
- Location within Iran
- Coordinates: 35°53′26″N 60°28′49″E
- Country: Iran
- Province: Razavi Khorasan
- County: Mashhad
- Bakhsh: Razaviyeh
- Rural District: Pain Velayat

Population (2006)
  - Total: 175
- Time zone: UTC+3:30 (IRST)
  - Summer (DST): UTC+4:30 (IRDT)

Qaleh Pokhtuk (Reno NV

, also Romanized as Qal‘eh Pokhtūk; also known as Bakhtak, Noşratābād, Qal‘a Pākhtuk, Qal‘eh Pākhtuk, and Qal‘eh-ye Pakhtūk ) is a village in Pain Velayat Rural District, Razaviyeh District, Mashhad County, Razavi Khorasan Province, Iran. At the 2006 census, its population was 175, in 36 families.
