= Baqer Tangeh =

Village in Mazandaran province, Iran

Baqer Tangeh Persian: باقرتنگه
- Village
- Location within Iran
- Coordinates: 36°42′19″N 52°42′12″E
- Country: Iran
- Province: Mazandaran
- County: Babolsar
- District: Central
- Rural District: Saheli

Population (2016)
  - Total: 6,213
- Time zone: UTC+3:30 (IRST)

Baqer Tangeh (Persian: باقرتنگه) (Note: Also romanized as Bāqer Tangeh) is a village in, and the capital of, Saheli Rural District in the Central District of Babolsar County, Mazandaran province, Iran. It is an eastern suburb of Babolsar city.

== Demographics ==
=== Population ===
At the time of the 2006 National Census, the village's population was 4,374 in 1,198 households. The following census in 2011 counted 5,327 people in 1,488 households. The 2016 census measured the population of the village as 6,213 people in 2,037 households. It was the most populous village in its rural district.
