= Qorqoruk =

Qorqoruk or Qarqoruk or Qareqoruk (Persian: قرقروك) may refer to:

- Qorqoruk-e Olya
- Qorqoruk-e Sofla
