= Gavzan Mahalleh =

Gavzan Mahalleh (Persian: گاوزن محله) may refer to:

- Gavzan Mahalleh, Babol Kenar, Babol County
- Gavzan Mahalleh, Bandpey-ye Sharqi, Babol County
- Gavzan Mahalleh, Babolsar
