= Abravan =

Abravan (Persian: ابروان) may refer to:

- Abravan, Mashhad
- Abravan Rural District
