= Orduluk =

Orduluk اردولوك
- Village
- Location within Iran
- Coordinates: 36°16′03″N 60°05′43″E
- Country: Iran
- Province: Razavi Khorasan
- County: Mashhad
- Bakhsh: Razaviyeh
- Rural District: Meyami

Population (2006)
  - Total: 183
- Time zone: UTC+3:30 (IRST)
  - Summer (DST): UTC+4:30 (IRDT)

Orduluk (Persian: اردولوك, also Romanized as Ordūlūk; also known as Ardalook, Ardalūk, Ardūlak, Ordolūk, and Urduluk) is a village in Meyami Rural District, Razaviyeh District, Mashhad County, Razavi Khorasan Province, Iran. At the 2006 census, its population was 183, in 37 families.
