= Shahrak-e Darya Kenar =

Private township in Mazandaran province, Iran

Shahrak-e Darya Kenar Persian: شهرك درياكنار
- Private Township
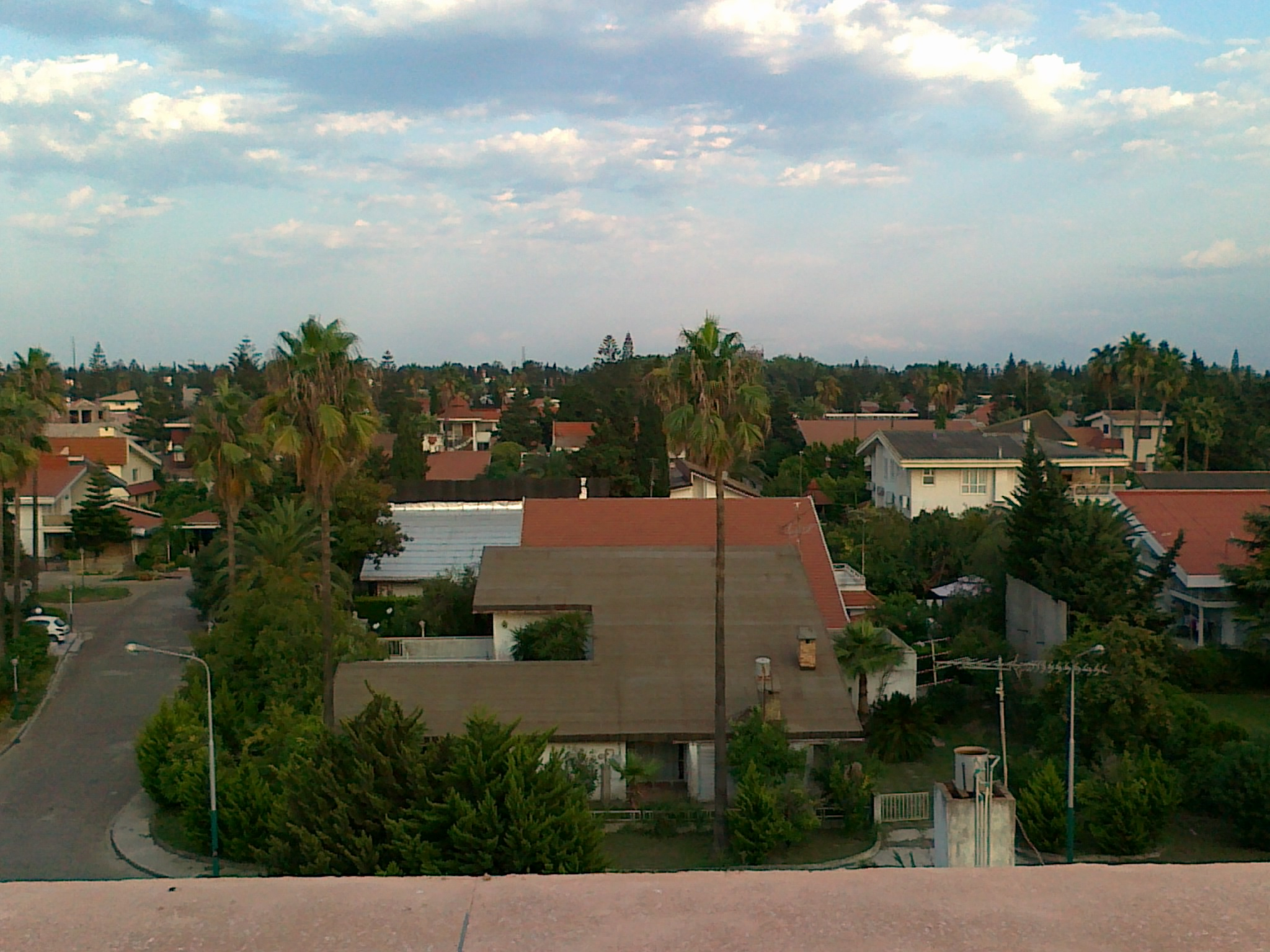

- Location within Iran
- Coordinates: 36°41′53″N 52°35′27″E
- Country: Iran
- Province: Mazandaran
- County: Babolsar
- District: Central
- Rural District: Babolrud

Population (2016)
  - Total: 2,150
  - Density: 374/km^{2} (970/sq mi)
- Time zone: UTC+3:30 (IRST)

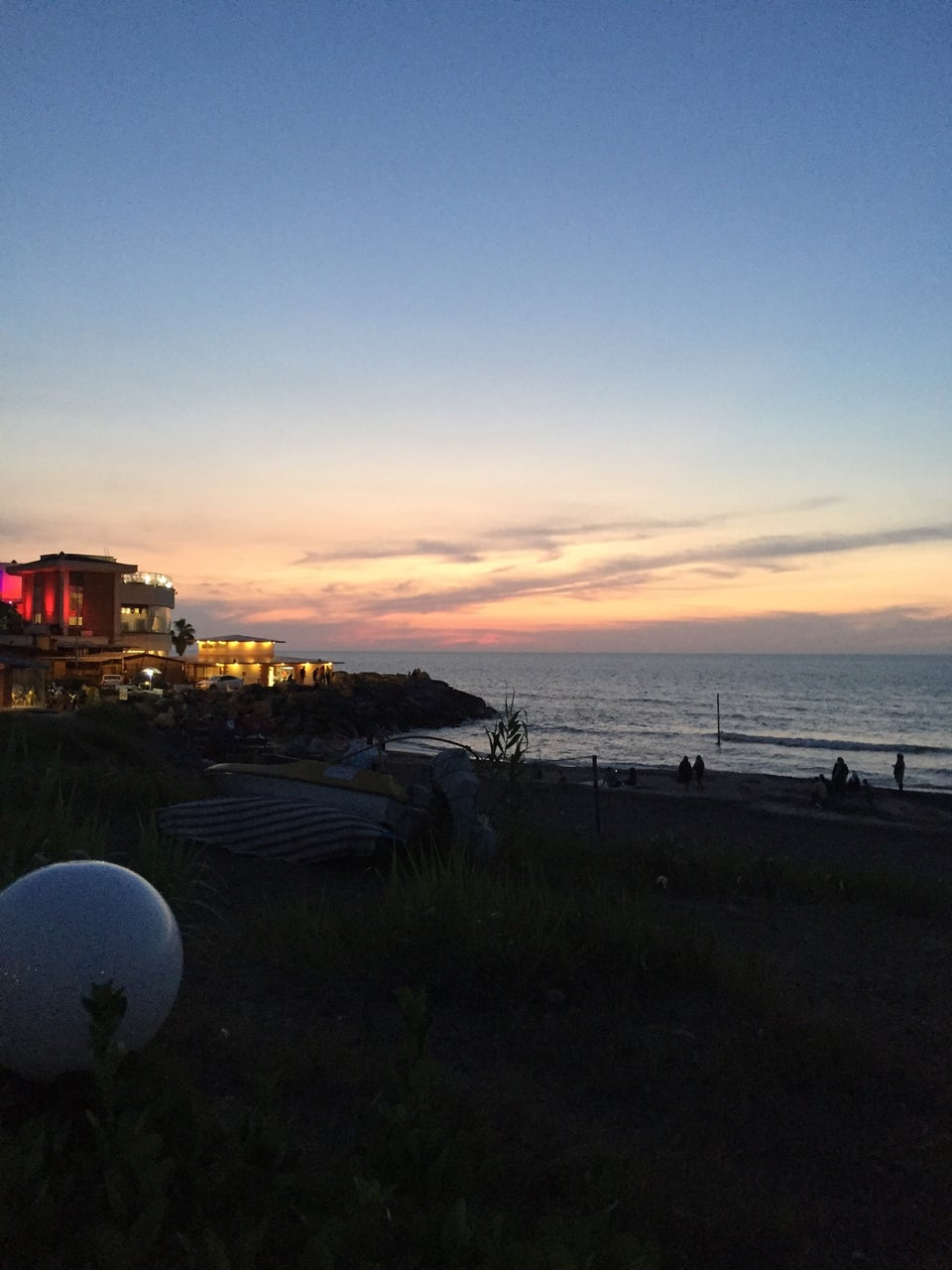
Seaside in Shahrak-e Darya Kenar

Shahrak-e Darya Kenar (Persian: شهرك درياكنار) (Note: Also romanized as Shahrak-e Daryā Kenār; also known as Daryā Kenār) is a private township in Babolrud Rural District of the Central District in Babolsar County, Mazandaran province, Iran.

Shahrak-e Darya Kenar is 5 km (3.1 miles) west of Babolsar, on the road to Fereydunkenar and next to the Caspian Sea coastline. Its construction dates back to the 1960s.

== Demographics ==
=== Population ===
At the time of the 2006 National Census, the township's population was 581 in 192 households, when it was in Barik Rud Rural District (Note: Renamed Barik Rud-e Shomali Rural District) of the former Fereydunkenar District. The following census in 2011 counted 390 people in 145 households, by which time the village had been transferred to Babolrud Rural District in the Central District. The 2016 census measured the population of the township as 374 people in 149 households.
