= Narimani =

Narimani (Persian: نريماني) may refer to:

- Narimani-ye Olya
- Narimani-ye Sofla
