= Chelmen Sang =

Chelmen Sang (Persian: چهل من سنگ) or Chelmeh Sang (Persian: چلمه سنگ) may refer to:

- Chelmen Sang-e Olya
- Chelmen Sang-e Sofla
