= Yahya ibn Zayd =

Son of Zayd ibn Ali

- يحيى بن زيد
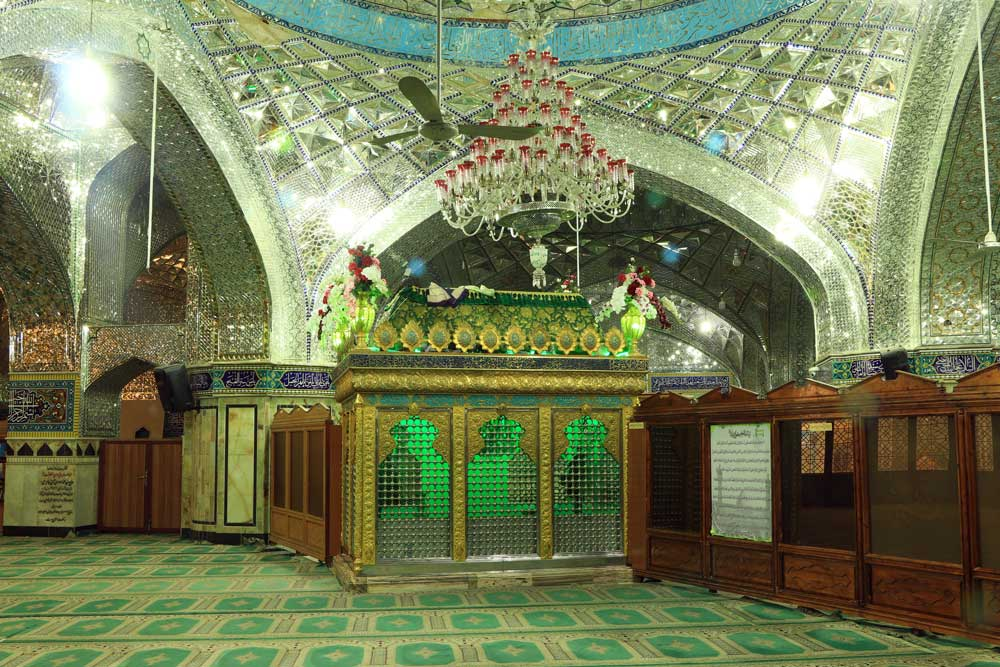
- Imamzadeh mausoleum and shrine to Yahya ibn Zayd in Gonbad-e Kavus, Iran

7th Zaydi Imam
- In office 739/740 CE – 743 CE
- Preceded by: Zayd ibn Ali
- Succeeded by: Muhammad al-Nafs al-Zakiyya

Personal life
- Born: 107 AH; 725/6 CE Medina, Hejaz
- Died: 125 AH; 743 CE
- Resting place: Guzgan, Afghanistan
- Spouse: Mahabba bint ʿUmar ibn ʿAli ibn al-Husayn
- Children: Hasan; Husayn; Zainab Al-Hussainiya; Umm al-Husayn
- Parents: Zayd ibn Ali (father); Rayta bint Abd Allah al-Alawiyya (mother)

Religious life
- Religion: Islam

Yahya ibn Zayd (Arabic: يحيى بن زيد, romanized: Yaḥyā ibn Zayd; 725/6–743) was the eldest son of Zayd ibn Ali, the founder of the Zaydi movement. He participated in the unsuccessful revolt against the Umayyad Caliphate launched by his father in 739/40, and escaped to Khurasan, where he tried with limited success to gain support for another rebellion. In 743 he was tracked down and finally killed by forces of the Umayyad governor, Nasr ibn Sayyar.

== Biography ==
Yahya was the oldest son of Zayd ibn Ali, a grandson of Husayn ibn Ali and thus great-great-grandson of Muhammad. His mother was Rayta, a daughter of Abd Allah ibn Muhammad ibn al-Hanafiyya. In 739/40 Yahya joined his father's uprising against the Umayyad Caliphate in Kufa. The revolt was swiftly crushed, however, by the Umayyad governor of Iraq, Yusuf ibn Umar al-Thaqafi, and Zayd was killed. Fleeing the pursuit of al-Thaqafi, he initially found refuge at Qasr Ibn Hubayra, where he was sheltered by a member of the Umayyad dynasty, Abd al-Malik ibn Bishr ibn Marwan.

After a while, Yahya resolved to move to the eastern province of Khurasan. At Mada'in he was identified by agents of al-Thaqafi, who resumed the pursuit, but Yahya was able to elude them and reach Sarakhs in Khurasan. Khurasan was well known for the grievances of the local Muslim population, which was large and heavily militarized, against the Umayyad government in Damascus; the province was the site of major clandestine pro-Shi'a activity in the form of the Hashimiyya movement, that would birth the Abbasid Revolution that overthrew the Umayyads a few years later. Yahya evidently hoped to find support there, but this was not to be. The leader of the local Hashimiyya, Bukayr ibn Mahan, even instructed his followers not to support an uprising by Yahya, as the hidden imam of the movement had foreseen its failure and Yahya's death.

At Sarakhs, Yahya was sheltered by the pro-Shi'a partisan Yazid ibn Umar al-Taymi. During his half-year stay there, Yahya tried to gather support for another uprising, but the only ones to respond favourably were some Kharijites, whose offer he rejected on the advice of Yazid. Yahya and Yazid then went on to Balkh, from where Yahya sent an appeal to the Hashimites, the tribe of Muhammad, at Medina, castigating them for not avenging the death of his father.

In 743, the hiding place of Yahya was betrayed to al-Thaqafi, who instructed the governor of Khurasan, Nasr ibn Sayyar, to capture him. Nasr's subgovernor at Balkh, Aqul ibn Ma'qil al-Laythi, imprisoned al-Harish ibn Abd al-Rahman al-Shaybani, who had been revealed as sheltering Yahya and his followers, and tortured him to reveal his guests' whereabouts; fearing for his father's life, Harish's son betrayed them to the authorities. Yahya and his companions were brought to Nasr at Merv, but on orders from caliph al-Walid II, Nasr ordered them released. The Umayyad governor gave Yahya money and two mules and instructed him to go straight to Damascus to the caliph's court, without lingering on the way; but when Yahya reached the boundary of Khurasan at Bayhaq, he turned back, afraid of crossing into the province of his sworn enemy al-Thaqafi. This was an act of rebellion, and Umayyad troops began to move against him and his seventy followers. Yahya scored a first victory over the much more numerous Umayyads at Bushtaniqan, in which the governor of Nishapur, Amr ibn Zurara al-Qushayri, was killed.

After the battle, Yahya moved to Herat and Guzgan, the numbers of his followers rising to 150 along the way, but still far inferior to the forces mobilized against him by Nasr. The Umayyad army, commanded by Salm ibn Ahwaz al-Mazini, caught up with Yahya at the village of Arghuya. After a three-day combat, the rebels were defeated; most of them were killed, as was Yahya, who was hit by an arrow in the head. Yahya's head was cut off and sent to Damascus, where it was publicly exhibited, while his body was crucified at the gates of the provincial capital, Anbar.

The comparative genealogy of the Abbasid caliphs with their rival Zaydi imams

Abbasids

Caliphs of the Abbasid Caliphate
Caliphs of Cairo
Zaydi imams

ʿAbd al-Muṭṭalib ibn ʿHāshīm
ʾAbū Ṭālib ibn ʿAbd al-Muṭṭalib	Abū'l-Fādl al-ʿAbbās ibn ʿAbd al-Muṭṭalib	ʿAbd Allāh ibn ʿAbd al-Muṭṭalib
ʿAlīyyū'l-Murtaḍžā^{(1st Imām of Kaysāniyyā, Zaydīyyā, Imāmiyyā)}	Hibr al-Ummah ʿAbd Allāh ibn al-ʿAbbās	Khātam al-Nabiyyin; Abū'l-Qāsīm; Muḥammad ibn ʿAbd Allāh
Al-Ḥasan al-Mujtabā^{(2nd Imām of Kaysāniyyā, Zaydīyyā, Imāmiyyā)}	Hussayn ibn Ali^{(3rd Imām of Kaysāniyyā, Zaydīyyā, Imāmiyyā)}	Abū'l-Qāsīm Muḥammad al-Hānafīyya^{(4th Imām of Kaysāniyyā)}	ʿAlī ibn ʿAbd Allāh al-Sajjad
Al-Ḥasan al-Mu'thannā^{(5th Imām of Zaydiyyā)}	Ali al-Sajjad (Zayn al-ʿĀbidīn)^{(4th Imām of Zaydiyyā, Imāmiyyā)}	Abū Hāshīm ʿAbd Allāh ibn Muḥammad^{(5th Imām of Hāsheemīyyā)}	Muḥammad "al-Imām"^{(6th Imām of Hāsheemīyyā)} 716/7 - 743	ʿAbd Allāh ibn ʿAlī^{(Governor of Syria)} 750–754	Ṣāliḥ ibn ʿAlī^{(Governor of Egypt)} 750–751
ʿAbd Allāh al-Kāmīl ibn al-Ḥasan al-Mu'thannā	Zayd ibn Ali^{(6th Imām of Zaydiyyā)}	Ibrāhim (Ebrāheem) "al-Imām"^{(7th Imām of Hāsheemīyyā)} 743 - 749	Abū Jāʿfar ʿAbd Allāh al-Mānṣūr^{(2)} r. 754–775	Abū'l-ʿAbbās ʿAbd Allāh as-Saffāh^{(1)} r. 750–754	Mūsā ibn Muḥammad "al-Imām"
Nafsū'zZakiyya^{(First elected caliph by Ibrāhim, Mānṣūr, Saffāh, Imām Mālīk & Abū Ḥanīfa)}^{(8th Imām of Zaydiyyā)}	Yahya ibn Zayd^{(7th Imām of Zaydiyyā)}	Abū Muslīm al-Khurāsānī^{(Governor of Khurasan)} 748–755	Muḥammad al-Mahdī^{(3)} r. 775–785	Jāʿfar^{(Wali al-Ahd & Governor of Mosul)} 762–764	ʿĪsā ibn Mūsā^{(Governor of Kufa)} 750–765
ʿAbd Allāh; Shāh Ghāzī (ʿAbd Allāh ibn Muḥammad)^{(10th Imām of Zaydiyyā)}	Ibrāhīm ibn ʿAbd Allāh al-Kāmīl ibn al-Ḥasan al-Mu'thannā^{ibn Ḥasan al-Mujtabā}^{(9th Imām of Zaydiyyā)}	Al-Ḥusayn ibn ʿAlī al-ʿĀbid ibn al-Ḥasan al-Mu'thallath^{ibn Ḥasan al-Mu'thannā}^{(12th Imām of Zaydiyyā)}	Hārūn ar-Rāshīd^{(5)} r. 786–809	ʿMūsā al-Hādī^{(4)} r. 785–786	^{(The Governors)}: Mūsā ^{(Kufa, Egypt & Medina)}; Ismā'īl ^{(Egypt)}; Dā'wūd^{(Medina)}
Sulaymān^{ibn ʿAbd Allāh al-Kāmīl ibn al-Ḥasan II}^{(Emir of Tlemcen)}^{(Sulaymanid dynasty of Western Algeria)}	Yaḥyā^{ibn ʿAbd Allāh al-Kāmīl ibn al-Ḥasan al-Mu'thannā}^{(14th Imām of Zaydiyyā)}	Ibrāhīm Ṭabāṭabā^{ibn Ismāʿīl al-Dībādj ibn Ibrāhīm al-Ghamr ibn al-Ḥasan al-Mu'thannā}	Muḥammad al-Mu'tasim^{(8)} r. 833–842	Abd Allāh al-Ma'mun^{(7)} r. 813–833	Muḥammad al-Amin^{(6)} r. 809–813
Sūlaymān^{ibn ʿAbd Allāh as-Sālih ibn Mūsā al-Jawn ibn ʿAbd Allāh al-Kāmīl ibn al-Ḥasan al-Mu'thannā}	Idrīs the Elder ibn ʿAbd Allāh^{(Idrisid dynasty of Morocco)}^{(15th Imām of Zaydiyyā)}	Muḥammad ibn IbrāhīmṬabāṭabā^{(16th Imām of Zaydiyyā)}	Jāʿfar al-Mutawakkil^{(10)} r. 847–861	Muḥammad ibn Muḥammad al-Mu'tasim	Hārūn al-Wathiq^{(9)} r. 842–847
Mūsā II^{ibn ʿAbd Allāh as-Sâlih ibn Mūsā al-Jawn ibn ʿAbd Allāh al-Kāmīl}	Idrīs ibn Idrīs^{(2nd Zaydī Imām of Idrisids in Morocco)}	Muḥammad al-Muntasir^{(11)} r. 861–862	Ṭalḥa al-Muwaffaq^{(Regent)} 870–891	Aḥmad al-Musta'in^{(12)} r. 862–866	Muḥammad al-Muhtadi^{(14)} r. 869–870
Ismāʿīl ibn Yūsūf; Al-Ukhayḍhir^{ibn Ibrāhīm ibn Mūsā al-Jawn ibn ʿAbd Allāh al-Kāmīl ibn Ḥasan al-Mu'thannā}	Al-Qāsīm ar-Rassī ibn IbrāhīmṬabāṭabā^{(19th Imām of Zaydiyyā)}	Ibrahim al-Mu'ayyad^{(Wali al-Ahd & Governor of Syria)} 850–861	Aḥmad al-Mu'tadid^{(16)} r. 892–902	Muḥammad al-Mu'tazz^{(13)} r. 866–869	Aḥmad al-Mu'tamid^{(15)} r. 870–892
Muḥammad ibn Yūsūf; Al-Ukhayḍhir^{(1st Zaydī Imām of Ukhaydhirites in Najd and Al-Yamama)}	^{Abūʾl-Ḥusayn; Al-Hādī ilāʾl-Ḥaqq} Yaḥyā ibn al-Ḥusayn^{(1st Zaydī Imām of Rassids in Yemen)}	ʿAlī al-Muktafī^{(17)} r. 902–908	Jāʿfar al-Muqtadir^{(18)} r. 908–929, 929–932	Muḥammad al-Qāhir^{(19)} r. 929, 932–934	Jāʿfar al-Mufawwid^{(Wali al-Ahd)} 875–892
Zayd ibn al-Ḥasan al-Mujtabā ibn ʿAlī ibn Abī Ṭālib	ʿAbd Allāh al-Mustakfī^{(22)} r. 944–946	Al-Faḍl al-Mutīʿ^{(23)} r. 946–974	Ishāq ibn Jāʿfar al-Muqtadir	Muḥammad al-Rādī^{(20)} r. 934–940	Ībrāhīm al-Muttaqī^{(21)} r. 940–944
Ḥasan ibn Zayd ibn al-Ḥasan al-Mujtabā ibn ʿAlīyyū'l-Murtaḍžā	ʿUmar al-Ashraf ibn ʿAlī Zayn al-ʿĀbidīn ibn al-Ḥusayn	ʿAbd al-Karīm al-Ṭāʾiʿ^{(24)} r. 974–991	Aḥmad al-Qāʿdīr^{(25)} r. 991–1031
Ismāʿīl ibn Ḥasan ibn Zayd ibn al-Ḥasan al-Mujtabā	ʿAlī ibn ʿUmar al-Ashraf ibn ʿAlī Zayn al-ʿĀbidīn	Al-Ḥusayn Dhu'l-Dam'a ibn Zayd ibn ʿAlī Zayn al-ʿĀbidīn	ʿAbd Allāh al-Qāʿīm^{(26)} r. 1031–1075
Muḥammad ibn Ismāʿīl ibn Ḥasan ibn Zayd	Al-Ḥasan ibn ʿAlī ibn ʿUmar al-Ashraf	Yaḥyā ibn al-Ḥusayn Dhu'l-Dam'a ibn Zayd	Muḥammad Dhakīrat ad-Dīn^{(Wali al-Ahd)} 1039–1056
Zayd ibn Muḥammad ibn Ismāʿīl ibn Ḥasan	ʿAlī ibn al-Ḥasan ibn ʿAlī ibn ʿUmar al-Ashraf	ʿUmar ibn Yaḥyā ibn al-Ḥusayn Dhu'l-Dam'a	ʿAbd Allāh al-Mūqtādī^{(27)} r. 1075–1094
^{Al-Dāʿī al-Kabīr} Hasan ibn Zayd^{(1st Zaydī Imām of Zaydīds in Tabaristan)}	^{Al-Dāʿī al-Ṣaghīr} Muhammad ibn Zayd^{(2nd Zaydī Imām of Zaydīds in Tabaristan)}	Yaḥyā ibn ʿUmar^{(20th Imām of Zaydiyyā in Samarra)}	Aḥmad al-Mūstāzhīr^{(28)} r. 1094–1118
^{Al-Nāṣir liʾl-Ḥāqq} Hasan al-Utrush^{(3rd Zaydī Imām of Zaydīds in Tabaristan)}	Al-Faḍl al-Mūstārshīd^{(29)} r. 1118–1135
Al-Mānṣūr al-Rāshīd^{(30)} r. 1135–1136
Muḥammad al-Mūqtāfī^{(31)} r. 1136–1160	Alī ibn al-Faḍl al-Qabī
Yūsuf al-Mūstānjīd^{(32)} r. 1160–1170	al-Hāsān ibn Alī
Al-Hāssān al-Mūstādī'^{(33)} r. 1170–1180	Abū Bakr ibn al-Hāsān
Aḥmad al-Nāsīr^{(34)} r. 1180–1225	Abi 'Alī al-Hāsān ibn Abū Bakr
Muḥammad az-Zāhīr^{(35)} r. 1225–1226	Malīka'zZāhīr Rūkn ad-Dīn Baybars^{(Mamluk Sultanate Sultan of Egypt)} r. 1260–1277
Al-Mānsūr al-Mūstānsīr^{(36)} r. 1226–1242	Abū'l-Qāsim Aḥmad al-Mūstānsīr^{(1)} r. 1261	Abū'l-ʿAbbās Aḥmad al-Hakim I^{(2)} r. 1262–1302
ʿAbd Allāh al-Mūstā'sīm^{(37)} r. 1242–1258	Abū'r-Rabīʿ Sulaymān al-Mustakfī I^{(3)} r. 1302–1340	Aḥmad ibn Aḥmad al-Ḥākim bi-amr Allāh
Abū'l-ʿAbbās Aḥmad al-Hakim II^{(5)} r. 1341–1352	Abū'l-Fatḥ Abū Bakr al-Mu'tadid I^{(6)} r. 1352–1362	Abū Isḥāq Ibrāhīm al-Wāṯiq I^{(4)} r. 1340–1341
Abū ʿAbd Allāh Muḥammad al-Mutawakkil I^{(7)} r. 1362–1377, 1377–1383, 1389–1406	Abū Yāḥyā Zakariyāʾ al-Musta'sim^{(8)} r. 1377, 1386–1389	Abū Ḥafs ʿUmar al-Wāṯiq II^{(9)} r. 1383–1386
Abū'l-Faḍl al-ʿAbbās al-Musta'īn^{(10)} r. 1406–1414; Sultan of Egypt r. 1412	Abū'l-Fatḥ Dāwud al-Mu'tadīd II^{(11)} r. 1414–1441	Abū'r-Rabīʿ Sulaymān al-Mustakfī II^{(12)} r. 1441–1451	Yaʿqūb ibn Muḥammad al-Mutawakkil ʿalā'Llāh	Abū'l-Baqāʾ Ḥamza al-Qāʾim^{(13)} r. 1451–1455	Abū'l-Maḥāsin Yūsuf al-Mustanjid^{(14)} r. 1455–1479
Abū'l-ʿIzz ʿAbd al-ʿAzīz al-Mutawakkil II^{(15)} r. 1479–1497
Abū'ṣ-Ṣabr Yaʿqūb al-Mustamsik^{(16)} r. 1497–1508, 1516–1517
Muḥammad al-Mutawakkil III^{(17)} r. 1508–1516, 1517

== Legacy ==
Yahya's death shocked the Shi'a partisans in Khurasan, and the cry for revenge was a major motive for the Hahsimiyya during the Abbasid Revolution, partly in atonement for their failure to support him. The death of Yahya and his father, which eliminated two of the most prominent candidates of the anti-Umayyad Alid legitimist cause, likely accelerated the turn of the Khurasan Hashimiyya, which had been operating semi-independently until then on behalf of the Alids in general, towards accepting the leadership of the Abbasids. The Abbasids and their agents in Khurasan were certainly aware of the grief caused by Yahya's death and sought to exploit it; even the adoption of black as the colour of the Abbasids and their followers was attributed, in one tradition, to a sign of mourning for Yahya's death. Likewise, after the initial success of the Abbasid Revolution in Khurasan its military commander, Abu Muslim, ordered the execution of all persons involved in Yahya's death, while Yahya's body was recovered from the cross and given a proper burial at Anbar. His tomb later became a popular site of pilgrimage. Yahya came to be regarded as an imam by the Zaydi Shi'a, and imamzadeh shrines are devoted to his memory in some Iranian cities, including Gonbad-e Kavus, Gorgan, Meyami, Sabzevar, Sarpol and Varamin.

== Gallery ==
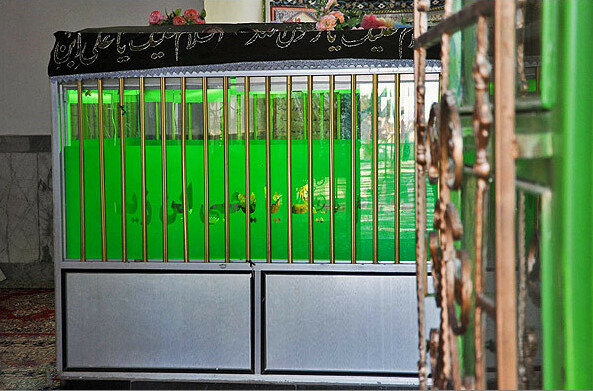
Imamzadeh shrine to Yahya ibn Zayd in Azizabad, Iran

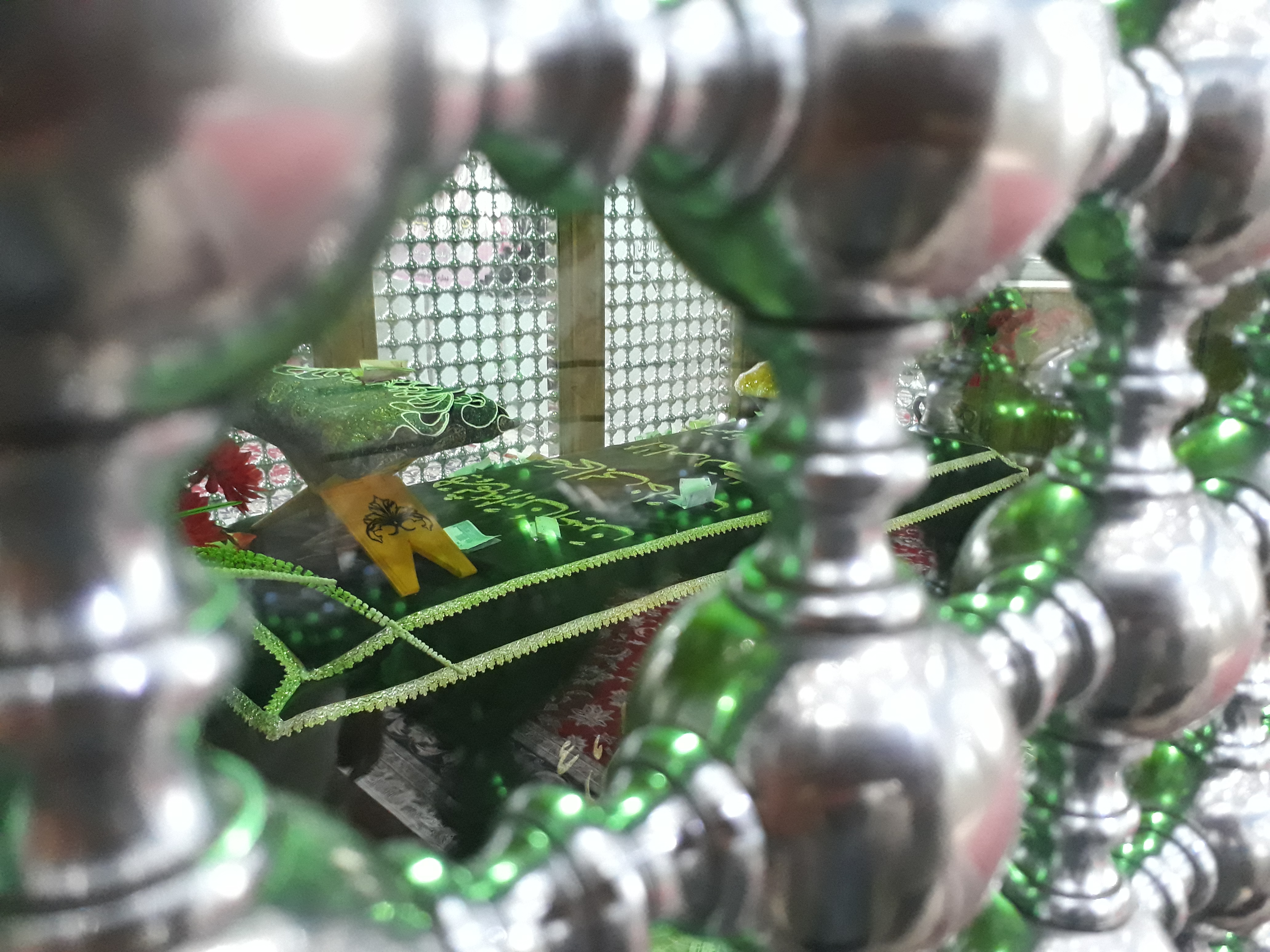
Imamzadeh shrine to Yahya ibn Zayd in Meyami, Iran
