= Jar Khoshk =

Jar Khoshk (Persian: جرخشك) may refer to:

- Jar Khoshk-e Olya
- Jar Khoshk-e Sofla
