= Owksar =

Village in Mazandaran province, Iran

Owksar Persian: اوكسر
- Village
- Location within Iran
- Coordinates: 36°42′27″N 52°43′47″E
- Country: Iran
- Province: Mazandaran
- County: Babolsar
- District: Central
- Rural District: Saheli

Population (2016)
  - Total: 314
- Time zone: UTC+3:30 (IRST)

Owksar (Persian: اوكسر) is a village in Saheli Rural District of the Central District in Babolsar County, Mazandaran province, Iran.

== Demographics ==
=== Population ===
At the time of the 2006 National Census, the village's population was 246 in 67 households. The following census in 2011 counted 299 people in 86 households. The 2016 census measured the population of the village as 314 people in 100 households.
