= Baz Howz-e Sofla =

Baz Howz-e Sofla بازحوض سفلي
- Village
- Location within Iran
- Coordinates: 36°04′57″N 59°44′52″E
- Country: Iran
- Province: Razavi Khorasan
- County: Mashhad
- Bakhsh: Razaviyeh
- Rural District: Meyami

Population (2006)
  - Total: 332
- Time zone: UTC+3:30 (IRST)
  - Summer (DST): UTC+4:30 (IRDT)

Baz Howz-e Sofla (Persian: بازحوض سفلي, also Romanized as Bāz Ḩowz̤-e Soflá; also known as Bāz Ḩowz-e Pā’īn, Bāzeh Ḩowz-e Pā’īn, Bāzeh Ḩowz-e Soflá, and Bāz Ḩowz) is a village in Meyami Rural District, Razaviyeh District, Mashhad County, Razavi Khorasan Province, Iran. At the 2006 census, its population was 332, in 83 families.
