= Abu Salama Hafs ibn Sulayman al-Khallal =

Abbasid missionary

Abu Salama Hafs ibn Sulayman al-Khallal (Arabic: أبو سلمة حفص بن سليمان الخلال) was an anti-Umayyad missionary and one of the principal leaders of the Hashimiyya movement, that launched the Abbasid Revolution. During September–November 749 he was the de facto ruler of Kufa and of the movement, and tried to install an Alid as caliph at the head of the Revolution. His efforts failed, and the Khurasani army instead recognized the Abbasid al-Saffah as caliph. He remained in office, but was assassinated by the Abbasids shortly after due to his pro-Alid leanings.

== Life ==
Hailing from Kufa, Abu Salama was originally a slave, before being freed. In c. 744, following the death of Bukayr ibn Mahan, he became the leader of the missionary movement (da'wah) of the Hashimiyya in Kufa. The Hashimiyya was an underground movement that opposed the ruling Umayyad dynasty as oppressive and un-Islamic, and was at the time led by members of the Abbasid family. However, they remained in the background, and the movement instead operated in the name of a shadowy 'chosen one from the Family of Muhammad' (al-ridha min Al Muhammad), reflecting the widely-held expectation for a quasi-messianic figure that would have the divine guidance necessary to rule according to the Quran and the Sunnah and create a truly Islamic government that would bring justice to the Muslim community.

The Khurasani forces of the Abbasid Revolution arrived at Kufa in August 749, defeating the Umayyad forces on their way. The city rose up in revolt and opened its gates to the Khurasanis on 2 September. Members of the Abbasid clan started flocking to Kufa as soon as it was freed from Umayyad rule. While its military forces were victorious, the Hashimiyya at this point had been left leaderless, as its hidden imam, the Abbasid Ibrahim ibn Muhammad, had been executed by the Umayyads at Harran. Ibrahim is said by some sources to have nominated his brother, Abu'l-Abbas, as his successor. However, Abu Salama did not appear ready to accept either Abu'l-Abbas or any other Abbasid as his leader, instead favouring installing an Alid as the leader of the victorious movement. As a result, he ordered the Abbasids to remain in hiding, and even refused to cover their travel costs.

With the Revolution triumphant, Abu Salama was hailed by the troops and people as wazir Al Muhammad ('Helper of the House of Muhammad')—from which the Abbasid vizierate would draw its name a generation later—and took over government, while the followers of the Hashimiyya expected him to reveal the identity of the eagerly awaited 'chosen one'.

To that end, Abu Salama went to the Khurasani encampment at A'yan, and opened negotiations with various Alid candidates, hoping to become the effective king-maker. However, all of the candidates approached—Ja'far al-Sadiq, Abdallah ibn al-Hasan, and Umar ibn Ali ibn al-Husayn—either flatly refused or hesitated to accept and negotiated for better terms. While this went on, one of the Khurasani commanders, Abu'l-Jahm, realised Abu Salama's plans and moved to thwart them: twelve prominent army leaders rode into Kufa, presented themselves to Abu'l-Abbas, and pledged allegiance (bay'ah) to him as caliph. Abu Salama had to bow to events, and also recognized Abu'l-Abbas. On the next day, 28 November, Abu'l-Abbas was publicly proclaimed caliph with the regnal name of al-Saffah.

The new caliph retained Abu Salama as his chief minister, but nevertheless remained suspicious of his sincerity, and immediately began planning to eliminate him. First he contacted the chief leader of the Revolution and ruler of Khurasan, Abu Muslim, to secure his consent, as Abu Muslim and Abu Salama had been old comrades. Abu Muslim not only agreed, but even provided the man to do the job. Abu Salama was murdered, and the deed blamed on Kharijite renegades.

== Sources ==
- Agha, Saleh Said (2003). The Revolution which Toppled the Umayyads: Neither Arab nor ʿAbbāsid. Leiden and Boston: Brill. ISBN 90-04-12994-4.
- Goitein, S. D. (1966). "The Origin of the Vizierate and its True Character & Appendix: On the Origin of the Term Vizier". Studies in Islamic History and Institutions. Leiden: E. J. Brill. pp. 168–196.
- Hawting, Gerald R. (2000). The First Dynasty of Islam: The Umayyad Caliphate AD 661–750 (Second ed.). London and New York: Routledge. ISBN 0-415-24072-7.
- Kennedy, Hugh (2004). The Prophet and the Age of the Caliphates: The Islamic Near East from the 6th to the 11th Century (Second ed.). Harlow: Longman. ISBN 978-0-582-40525-7.
- Moscati, S. (1960). "Abū Salama Ḥafṣ b. Sulaymān al-K̲h̲allāl"". In Gibb, H. A. R.; Kramers, J. H.; Lévi-Provençal, E.; Schacht, J.; Lewis, B. & Pellat, Ch. (eds.). The Encyclopaedia of Islam, Second Edition. Volume I: A–B. Leiden: E. J. Brill. p. 149. doi:10.1163/1573-3912_islam_SIM_0247. OCLC 495469456.
- Shaban, M. A. (1979). The ʿAbbāsid Revolution. Cambridge: Cambridge University Press. ISBN 0-521-29534-3.
- Virani, Shafique N. (2007). The Ismailis in the Middle Ages: A History of Survival, a Search for Salvation. Oxford and New York: Oxford University Press. ISBN 978-0-19-531173-0.
