= Ab Mal =

Ab Mal or Abmal (Persian: ابمال) may refer to:

- Abmal, Qaem Shahr, Mazandaran Province
- Abmal, Sari, Mazandaran Province
- Ab Mal, Mashhad, Razavi Khorasan Province
- Ab Mal, Sarakhs, Razavi Khorasan Province
