= Gav Borj =

Village in Razavi Khorasan province, Iran

Gav Borj Persian: گاوبرج
- Village
- Location within Iran
- Coordinates: 36°02′15″N 60°12′57″E
- Country: Iran
- Province: Razavi Khorasan
- County: Mashhad
- District: Razaviyeh
- Rural District: Pain Velayat

Population (2016)
  - Total: 1,043
- Time zone: UTC+3:30 (IRST)

Gav Borj (Persian: گاوبرج) (Note: Also romanized as Gāv Borj; also known as Kāv Borj) is a village in Pain Velayat Rural District of Razaviyeh District in Mashhad County, Razavi Khorasan province, Iran.

== Demographics ==
=== Population ===
At the time of the 2006 National Census, the village's population was 785 in 169 households. The following census in 2011 counted 942 people in 239 households. The 2016 census measured the population of the village as 1,043 people in 284 households.
