= Kalateh-ye Mirza Jani =

Village in Razavi Khorasan province, Iran

Kalateh-ye Mirza Jani Persian: كلاته ميرزاجاني
- Village
- Location within Iran
- Coordinates: 36°05′32″N 60°07′27″E
- Country: Iran
- Province: Razavi Khorasan
- County: Mashhad
- District: Razaviyeh
- Rural District: Pain Velayat

Population (2016)
  - Total: 715
- Time zone: UTC+3:30 (IRST)

Kalateh-ye Mirza Jani (Persian: كلاته ميرزاجاني) (Note: Also romanized as Kalāteh-ye Mīrzā Jānī; also known as Kalāteh Mīrzā Jān (كلاته ميرزاجان), Kalāteh-ye Khān Mīrzā Khān, Kalāteh-ye Mirājān, Kalāteh-ye Mīrzā Jān, Kalāteh-ye Mīrzā Khān, Kalāt-i-Mirza Jān, Mīrzā Khānī, and Qalāt-i-Mirza Jān) is a village in Pain Velayat Rural District of Razaviyeh District in Mashhad County, Razavi Khorasan province, Iran.

== Demographics ==
=== Population ===
At the time of the 2006 National Census, the village's population was 728 in 145 households. The following census in 2011 counted 641 people in 168 households. The 2016 census measured the population of the village as 715 people in 188 households.
