= Ojak Sar =

Village in Mazandaran province, Iran

Ojak Sar Persian: اجاک سر
- Village
- Location within Iran
- Coordinates: 36°41′16″N 52°36′38″E
- Country: Iran
- Province: Mazandaran
- County: Babolsar
- District: Central
- Rural District: Babolrud

Population (2016)
  - Total: 3,511
- Time zone: UTC+3:30 (IRST)

Ojak Sar (Persian: اجاک سر) (Note: Also romanized as Ojāk Sar; also known as Owjāksar) is a village in Babolrud Rural District of the Central District in Babolsar County, Mazandaran province, Iran.

== Demographics ==
=== Population ===
At the time of the 2006 National Census, the village's population was 2,802 in 748 households. The following census in 2011 counted 3,123 people in 947 households. The 2016 census measured the population of the village as 3,511 people in 1,135 households. It was the most populous village in its rural district.
