= Babol Posht =

Village in Mazandaran province, Iran

Babol Posht Persian: بابل پشت
- Village
- Location within Iran
- Coordinates: 36°39′56″N 52°38′52″E
- Country: Iran
- Province: Mazandaran
- County: Babolsar
- District: Central
- Rural District: Babolrud

Population (2016)
  - Total: 1,539
- Time zone: UTC+3:30 (IRST)

Babol Posht (Persian: بابل پشت) (Note: Also romanized as Bābol Posht; also known as Bālā Bābol Posht) is a village in, and the capital of, Babolrud Rural District in the Central District of Babolsar County, Mazandaran province, Iran.

== Demographics ==
=== Population ===
At the time of the 2006 National Census, the village's population was 1,455 in 393 households. The following census in 2011 counted 1,515 people in 456 households. The 2016 census measured the population of the village as 1,539 people in 512 households.
