= Mirud =

Village in Mazandaran province, Iran

Mirud Persian: ميرود
- Village
- Location within Iran
- Coordinates: 36°43′13″N 52°44′15″E
- Country: Iran
- Province: Mazandaran
- County: Babolsar
- District: Central
- Rural District: Saheli

Population (2016)
  - Total: 183
- Time zone: UTC+3:30 (IRST)

Mirud (Persian: ميرود) (Note: Also romanized as Mīrūd) is a village in Saheli Rural District of the Central District in Babolsar County, Mazandaran province, Iran.

== Demographics ==
=== Population ===
At the time of the 2006 National Census, the village's population was 146 in 42 households, when it was in Bahnemir Rural District of Bahnemir District. The following census in 2011 counted 235 people in 76 households, by which time the village had been transferred to Saheli Rural District in the Central District. The 2016 census measured the population of the village as 183 people in 59 households.
