= Jar Khoshk-e Olya =

Jar Khoshk-e Olya جرخشك عليا
- Village
- Location within Iran
- Coordinates: 35°54′08″N 60°18′20″E
- Country: Iran
- Province: Razavi Khorasan
- County: Mashhad
- Bakhsh: Razaviyeh
- Rural District: Pain Velayat

Population (2006)
  - Total: 58
- Time zone: UTC+3:30 (IRST)
  - Summer (DST): UTC+4:30 (IRDT)

Jar Khoshk-e Olya (Persian: جرخشك عليا, also Romanized as Jar Khoshk-e ‘Olyā; also known as Jar Khoshk-e Bālā and Moḩsenābād) is a village in Pain Velayat Rural District, Razaviyeh District, Mashhad County, Razavi Khorasan Province, Iran. At the 2006 census, its population was 58, in 15 families.
