= Pain Ahmad Kola =

Village in Mazandaran province, Iran

Pain Ahmad Kola Persian: پايين احمدكلا
- Village
- Location within Iran
- Coordinates: 36°39′46″N 52°40′09″E
- Country: Iran
- Province: Mazandaran
- County: Babolsar
- District: Central
- Rural District: Saheli

Population (2016)
  - Total: 1,323
- Time zone: UTC+3:30 (IRST)

Pain Ahmad Kola (Persian: پايين احمدكلا) (Note: Also romanized as Pā’īn Aḩmad Kolā) is a village in Saheli Rural District of the Central District in Babolsar County, Mazandaran province, Iran.

== Demographics ==
=== Population ===
At the time of the 2006 National Census, the village's population was 1,158 in 285 households. The following census in 2011 counted 1,278 people in 379 households. The 2016 census measured the population of the village as 1,323 people in 427 households.
