= Chahak, Mashhad =

Village in Razavi Khorasan province, Iran

Chahak Persian: چاهك
- Village
- Location within Iran
- Coordinates: 36°02′16″N 60°07′42″E
- Country: Iran
- Province: Razavi Khorasan
- County: Mashhad
- District: Razaviyeh
- Rural District: Pain Velayat

Population (2016)
  - Total: 608
- Time zone: UTC+3:30 (IRST)

Chahak (Persian: چاهك) (Note: Also romanized as Chāhak) is a village in Pain Velayat Rural District of Razaviyeh District in Mashhad County, Razavi Khorasan province, Iran.

== Demographics ==
=== Population ===
At the time of the 2006 National Census, the village's population was 671 in 178 households. The following census in 2011 counted 573 people in 169 households. The 2016 census measured the population of the village as 608 people in 198 households.
