= Chenarak, Razavi Khorasan =

Village in Razavi Khorasan province, Iran

Chenarak Persian: چنارك
- Village
- Location within Iran
- Coordinates: 36°14′55″N 60°02′51″E
- Country: Iran
- Province: Razavi Khorasan
- County: Mashhad
- District: Razaviyeh
- Rural District: Meyami

Population (2016)
  - Total: 1,695
- Time zone: UTC+3:30 (IRST)

Chenarak (Persian: چنارك) (Note: Also romanized as Chanārak and Chenārak) is a village in Meyami Rural District of Razaviyeh District in Mashhad County, Razavi Khorasan province, Iran.

== Demographics ==
=== Population ===
At the time of the 2006 National Census, the village's population was 1,184 in 264 households. The following census in 2011 counted 1,742 people in 436 households. The 2016 census measured the population of the village as 1,695 people in 449 households.
