= Saheli =

Saheli may refer to:

- Ormeloxifene, a pharmaceutical
- Saheli (film), a Pakistani film
- Saheli Rural District, in Iran
