= Tangal-e Shur-e Olya =

Village in Razavi Khorasan province, Iran

Tangal-e Shur-e Olya Persian: تنگل شورعليا
- Village
- Location within Iran
- Coordinates: 36°08′12″N 59°50′11″E
- Country: Iran
- Province: Razavi Khorasan
- County: Mashhad
- District: Razaviyeh
- Rural District: Meyami

Population (2016)
  - Total: 1,690
- Time zone: UTC+3:30 (IRST)

Tangal-e Shur-e Olya (Persian: تنگل شورعليا) (Note: Also romanized as Tangal-e Shūr-e ‘Olyā; also known as Tangal-e Shūr, Tangal-e Shūr-e Bālā, Shahrak-e Qaem (شهرك قائم), and Shahrak-e Qā'im) is a village in Meyami Rural District of Razaviyeh District in Mashhad County, Razavi Khorasan province, Iran.

== Demographics ==
=== Population ===
At the time of the 2006 National Census, the village's population was 1,527 in 362 households. The following census in 2011 counted 1,705 people in 449 households. The 2016 census measured the population of the village as 1,690 people in 452 households.
