= Qazqan =

Village in Razavi Khorasan province, Iran

Qazqan Persian: قازقان
- Village
- Location within Iran
- Coordinates: 36°13′59″N 59°53′14″E
- Country: Iran
- Province: Razavi Khorasan
- County: Mashhad
- District: Razaviyeh
- Rural District: Meyami

Population (2016)
  - Total: 1,915
- Time zone: UTC+3:30 (IRST)

Qazqan (Persian: قازقان) (Note: Also romanized as Qāzqān) is a village in Meyami Rural District of Razaviyeh District in Mashhad County, Razavi Khorasan province, Iran.

== Demographics ==
=== Population ===
At the time of the 2006 National Census, the village's population was 1,514 in 331 households. The following census in 2011 counted 1,725 people in 456 households. The 2016 census measured the population of the village as 1,915 people in 537 households.
