= Qorqoruk-e Sofla =

Qorqoruk-e Sofla قرقروك سفلي
- Village
- Location within Iran
- Coordinates: 35°56′48″N 59°54′10″E
- Country: Iran
- Province: Razavi Khorasan
- County: Mashhad
- Bakhsh: Razaviyeh
- Rural District: Abravan

Population (2006)
  - Total: 312
- Time zone: UTC+3:30 (IRST)
  - Summer (DST): UTC+4:30 (IRDT)

Qorqoruk-e Sofla (Persian: قرقروك سفلي, also Romanized as Qorqorūk-e Soflá, Qareqorūk, Qarqorūk-e Soflá, and Qarqorūk Soflá; also known as Qorqorūk-e Pā’īn) is a village in Abravan Rural District, Razaviyeh District, Mashhad County, Razavi Khorasan Province, Iran. At the 2006 census, its population was 312, in 76 families.
