= Tappeh Salam =

Village in Razavi Khorasan province, Iran

Tappeh Salam Persian: تپه سلام
- Village
- Location within Iran
- Coordinates: 36°08′22″N 59°43′32″E
- Country: Iran
- Province: Razavi Khorasan
- County: Mashhad
- District: Razaviyeh
- Rural District: Meyami

Population (2016)
  - Total: 5,669
- Time zone: UTC+3:30 (IRST)

Tappeh Salam (Persian: تپه سلام) (Note: Also romanized as Tappeh Salām) is a village in Meyami Rural District of Razaviyeh District in Mashhad County, Razavi Khorasan province, Iran.

== Demographics ==
=== Population ===
At the time of the 2006 National Census, the village's population was 3,536 in 884 households. The following census in 2011 counted 4,715 people in 1,288 households. The 2016 census measured the population of the village as 5,669 people in 1,637 households, the most populous in its rural district.
