= Jimabad, Razavi Khorasan =

Village in Razavi Khorasan province, Iran

Jimabad Persian: جيم اباد
- Village
- Location within Iran
- Coordinates: 36°06′23″N 59°46′04″E
- Country: Iran
- Province: Razavi Khorasan
- County: Mashhad
- District: Razaviyeh
- Rural District: Meyami

Population (2016)
  - Total: 5,413
- Time zone: UTC+3:30 (IRST)

Jimabad (Persian: جيم اباد) (Note: Also romanized as Jīmābād) is a village in Meyami Rural District of Razaviyeh District in Mashhad County, Razavi Khorasan province, Iran.

== Demographics ==
=== Population ===
At the time of the 2006 National Census, the village's population was 4,199 in 1,086 households. The following census in 2011 counted 4,693 people in 1,333 households. The 2016 census measured the population of the village as 5,413 people in 1,565 households.
