= Soleymani, Mashhad =

Village in Razavi Khorasan province, Iran

Soleymani Persian: سليماني
- Village
- Location within Iran
- Coordinates: 36°00′39″N 60°02′10″E
- Country: Iran
- Province: Razavi Khorasan
- County: Mashhad
- District: Razaviyeh
- Rural District: Abravan

Population (2016)
  - Total: 901
- Time zone: UTC+3:30 (IRST)

Soleymani (Persian: سليماني) (Note: Also romanized as Soleymānī; also known as Salmānīyeh and Soleymānīyeh-ye Pā’īn) is a village in Abravan Rural District of Razaviyeh District in Mashhad County, Razavi Khorasan province, Iran.

== Demographics ==
=== Population ===
At the time of the 2006 National Census, the village's population was 712 in 146 households. The following census in 2011 counted 959 people in 257 households. The 2016 census measured the population of the village as 901 people in 246 households.
