= Sadat Mahalleh-ye Rudbast =

Village in Mazandaran province, Iran

Sadat Mahalleh-ye Rudbast Persian: سادات محله رودبست
- Village
- Location within Iran
- Coordinates: 36°40′15″N 52°36′10″E
- Country: Iran
- Province: Mazandaran
- County: Babolsar
- District: Central
- Rural District: Babolrud

Population (2016)
  - Total: 1,133
- Time zone: UTC+3:30 (IRST)

Sadat Mahalleh-ye Rudbast (Persian: سادات محله رودبست) (Note: Also romanized as Sādāt Maḩalleh-ye Rūdbast; also known as Sādāt Maḩalleh) is a village in Babolrud Rural District of the Central District in Babolsar County, Mazandaran province, Iran.

== Demographics ==
=== Population ===
At the time of the 2006 National Census, the village's population was 1,016 in 280 households. The following census in 2011 counted 1,129 people in 354 households. The 2016 census measured the population of the village as 1,133 people in 370 households.
