= Taqiabad, Mashhad =

Village in Razavi Khorasan province, Iran

Taqiabad Persian: تقي اباد
- Village
- Location within Iran
- Coordinates: 36°01′28″N 59°50′51″E
- Country: Iran
- Province: Razavi Khorasan
- County: Mashhad
- District: Razaviyeh
- Rural District: Abravan

Population (2016)
  - Total: 1,428
- Time zone: UTC+3:30 (IRST)

Taqiabad (Persian: تقی‌آباد) (Note: Also romanized as Taqīābād) is a village in Abravan Rural District of Razaviyeh District in Mashhad County, Razavi Khorasan province, Iran.

== Demographics ==
=== Population ===
At the time of the 2006 National Census, the village's population was 1,060 in 268 households. The following census in 2011 counted 1,311 people in 385 households. The 2016 census measured the population of the village as 1,428 people in 429 households.
