= Mian Dasht, Mazandaran =

Village in Mazandaran province, Iran

Mian Dasht Persian: مياندشت
- Neighbourhood
- Location within Iran
- Coordinates: 36°40′54″N 52°39′04″E
- Country: Iran
- Province: Mazandaran
- County: Babolsar
- District: Central
- City: Babolsar

Population (2011)
  - Total: 2,132
- Time zone: UTC+3:30 (IRST)

Mian Dasht (Persian: مياندشت) (Note: Also romanized as Mīān Dasht) is a southern neighborhood in the city of Babolsar in Mazandaran province, Iran. Formerly, it was a village in Babolrud Rural District of the Central District in Babolsar County.

== Demographics ==
=== Population ===
At the time of the 2006 National Census, the village's population was 2,082 in 558 households. The following census in 2011 counted 2,132 people in 664 households. Mian Dasht did not appear in the 2016 census, as it was annexed to Babolsar city.
