= Tazehabad, Babolsar =

Village in Mazandaran province, Iran

Tazehabad Persian: تازه اباد
- Village
- Location within Iran
- Coordinates: 36°40′57″N 52°43′56″E
- Country: Iran
- Province: Mazandaran
- County: Babolsar
- District: Central
- Rural District: Saheli

Population (2016)
  - Total: 573
- Time zone: UTC+3:30 (IRST)

Tazehabad (Persian: تازه اباد) (Note: Also romanized as Tāzehābād) is a village in Saheli Rural District of the Central District in Babolsar County, Mazandaran province, Iran.

== Demographics ==
=== Population ===
At the time of the 2006 National Census, the village's population was 608 in 159 households. The following census in 2011 counted 611 people in 184 households. The 2016 census measured the population of the village as 573 people in 195 households.
