= Salarabad, Razavi Khorasan =

Village in Razavi Khorasan province, Iran

Salarabad Persian: سالاراباد
- Village
- Location within Iran
- Coordinates: 36°13′56″N 59°45′43″E
- Country: Iran
- Province: Razavi Khorasan
- County: Mashhad
- District: Razaviyeh
- Rural District: Meyami

Population (2016)
  - Total: 3,948
- Time zone: UTC+3:30 (IRST)

Salarabad (Persian: سالاراباد) (Note: Also romanized as Sālārābād) is a village in Meyami Rural District of Razaviyeh District in Mashhad County, Razavi Khorasan province, Iran.

== Demographics ==
=== Population ===
At the time of the 2006 National Census, the village's population was 2,324 in 495 households. The following census in 2011 counted 2,882 people in 698 households. The 2016 census measured the population of the village as 3,948 people in 979 households.
