= Qorqoruk-e Olya =

Qorqoruk-e Olya قرقروك عليا
- Village
- Location within Iran
- Coordinates: 35°56′56″N 59°52′54″E
- Country: Iran
- Province: Razavi Khorasan
- County: Mashhad
- Bakhsh: Razaviyeh
- Rural District: Abravan

Population (2006)
  - Total: 63
- Time zone: UTC+3:30 (IRST)
  - Summer (DST): UTC+4:30 (IRDT)

Qorqoruk-e Olya (Persian: قرقروك عليا, also Romanized as Qorqorūk-e ‘Olyā, Qarqorūk-e ‘Olyā, and Qarqorūk ‘Olyā; also known as Qorqorūk-e Bālā) is a village in Abravan Rural District, Razaviyeh District, Mashhad County, Razavi Khorasan Province, Iran. According to the 2006 census, its population was 63, with 13 families.
