= Arreh =

Village in Razavi Khorasan province, Iran

Arreh Persian: اره
- Village
- Location within Iran
- Coordinates: 36°02′12″N 60°00′44″E
- Country: Iran
- Province: Razavi Khorasan
- County: Mashhad
- District: Razaviyeh
- Rural District: Abravan

Population (2016)
  - Total: 810
- Time zone: UTC+3:30 (IRST)

Arreh (Persian: اره) is a village in Abravan Rural District of Razaviyeh District in Mashhad County, Razavi Khorasan province, Iran.

== Demographics ==
=== Population ===
At the time of the 2006 National Census, the village's population was 694 in 167 households. The following census in 2011 counted 760 people in 226 households. The 2016 census measured the population of the village as 810 people in 259 households.
