= Qarneh-ye Sofla =

Village in Razavi Khorasan province, Iran

Qarneh-ye Sofla Persian: قرنه سفلي
- Village
- Location within Iran
- Coordinates: 35°53′35″N 60°31′54″E
- Country: Iran
- Province: Razavi Khorasan
- County: Mashhad
- District: Razaviyeh
- Rural District: Pain Velayat

Population (2016)
  - Total: 314
- Time zone: UTC+3:30 (IRST)

Qarneh-ye Sofla (Persian: قرنه سفلي) (Note: Also romanized as Qarneh-ye Soflá; also known as Garīz Ney, Ghirni, Qara Nāy, Qara Neh, Qarneh, and Qarneh-ye Pā’īn) is a village in Pain Velayat Rural District of Razaviyeh District in Mashhad County, Razavi Khorasan province, Iran.

== Demographics ==
=== Population ===
At the time of the 2006 National Census, the village's population was 341 in 78 households. The following census in 2011 counted 250 people in 67 households. The 2016 census measured the population of the village as 314 people in 83 households.
