= Aliabad, Babolsar =

Village in Mazandaran province, Iran

Aliabad Persian: علي اباد
- Village
- Location within Iran
- Coordinates: 36°40′21″N 52°38′56″E
- Country: Iran
- Province: Mazandaran
- County: Babolsar
- District: Central
- Rural District: Babolrud

Population (2016)
  - Total: 1,705
- Time zone: UTC+3:30 (IRST)

Aliabad (Persian: علی‌آباد) (Note: Also romanized as ‘Alīābād; also known as ‘Alīābād-e Pā’īn) is a village in Babolrud Rural District of the Central District in Babolsar County, Mazandaran province, Iran.

== Demographics ==
=== Population ===
At the time of the 2006 National Census, the village's population was 1,542 in 412 households. The following census in 2011 counted 1,768 people in 530 households. The 2016 census measured the population of the village as 1,705 people in 592 households.
