= Shurek =

Shurek (Persian: شورك) may refer to:

- Shurek, Mazandaran
- Shurek, North Khorasan
- Shurek, West Azerbaijan

== See also ==
- Shurak (disambiguation)
