= Kalateh-ye Manar =

Village in Razavi Khorasan province, Iran

Kalateh-ye Manar Persian: كلاته منار
- Village
- Location within Iran
- Coordinates: 35°56′15″N 60°14′26″E
- Country: Iran
- Province: Razavi Khorasan
- County: Mashhad
- District: Razaviyeh
- Rural District: Pain Velayat

Population (2016)
  - Total: 276
- Time zone: UTC+3:30 (IRST)

Kalateh-ye Manar (Persian: كلاته منار) (Note: Also romanized as Kalateh Manar, Kalateh Menar, Kalāteh Menār, Kalāteh-ye Manār, and Kalāteh-ye Menār; also known as Kalāt-i-Mīnār) is a village in, and the capital of, Pain Velayat Rural District in Razaviyeh District of Mashhad County, Razavi Khorasan province, Iran.

== Demographics ==
=== Population ===
At the time of the 2006 National Census, the village's population was 719 in 164 households. The following census in 2011 counted 388 people in 107 households. The 2016 census measured the population of the village as 276 people in 82 households.
