= Chehel Man Sang-e Sofla =

Village in Razavi Khorasan province, Iran

Chehel Man Sang-e Sofla Persian: چهل من سنگ سفلي
- Village
- Location within Iran
- Coordinates: 35°53′27″N 60°03′00″E
- Country: Iran
- Province: Razavi Khorasan
- County: Mashhad
- District: Razaviyeh
- Rural District: Abravan

Population (2016)
  - Total: 1,005
- Time zone: UTC+3:30 (IRST)

Chehel Man Sang-e Sofla (Persian: چهل من سنگ سفلي) (Note: Also romanized as Chehel Man Sang-e Soflá; also known as Chehel Man Sang-e Pā’īn (چهل من سنگ پائين), Chelmeh Sang-e Soflá, Chelmen Sang-e Pā’īn, Chelmen Sang-e Sofla, Chelmen Sang-e Soflá, and Cholmeh Sang) is a village in Abravan Rural District of Razaviyeh District in Mashhad County, Razavi Khorasan province, Iran.

== Demographics ==
=== Population ===
At the time of the 2006 National Census, the village's population was 857 in 175 households. The following census in 2011 counted 902 people in 224 households. The 2016 census measured the population of the village as 1,005 people in 268 households.
