= Kharzar, Mashhad =

Village in Razavi Khorasan province, Iran

Kharzar Persian: خارزار
- Village
- Location within Iran
- Coordinates: 36°02′48″N 60°11′15″E
- Country: Iran
- Province: Razavi Khorasan
- County: Mashhad
- District: Razaviyeh
- Rural District: Pain Velayat

Population (2016)
  - Total: 250
- Time zone: UTC+3:30 (IRST)

Kharzar (Persian: خارزار) (Note: Also romanized as Khārzār) is a village in Pain Velayat Rural District of Razaviyeh District in Mashhad County, Razavi Khorasan province, Iran.

== Demographics ==
=== Population ===
At the time of the 2006 National Census, the village's population was 233 in 51 households. The following census in 2011 counted 270 people in 63 households. The 2016 census measured the population of the village as 250 people in 69 households.
