= Ab Mal, Mashhad =

Village in Razavi Khorasan province, Iran

Ab Mal Persian: ابمال
- Village
- Location within Iran
- Coordinates: 36°01′43″N 60°00′47″E
- Country: Iran
- Province: Razavi Khorasan
- County: Mashhad
- District: Razaviyeh
- Rural District: Abravan

Population (2016)
  - Total: 1,275
- Time zone: UTC+3:30 (IRST)

Ab Mal (Persian: ابمال) (Note: Also romanized as Āb Māl; also known as Ābmadal) is a village in Abravan Rural District of Razaviyeh District in Mashhad County, Razavi Khorasan province, Iran.

== Demographics ==
=== Population ===
At the time of the 2006 National Census, the village's population was 1,179 in 273 households. The following census in 2011 counted 1,257 people in 349 households. The 2016 census measured the population of the village as 1,275 people in 380 households.
