= Babolrud Rural District =

Rural district in Mazandaran province, Iran

Babolrud Rural District Persian: دهستان بابلرود
- Rural District
- Location within Iran
- Coordinates: 36°41′N 52°38′E
- Country: Iran
- Province: Mazandaran
- County: Babolsar
- District: Central
- Established: 1995
- Capital: Babol Posht

Population (2016)
  - Total: 11,244
- Time zone: UTC+3:30 (IRST)

Babolrud Rural District (Persian: دهستان بابلرود) is in the Central District of Babolsar County, Mazandaran province, Iran. Its capital is the village of Babol Posht.

== Demographics ==
=== Population ===
At the time of the 2006 National Census, the rural district's population was 11,644 in 3,126 households. There were 13,178 inhabitants in 4,067 households at the following census of 2011. The 2016 census measured the population of the rural district as 11,244 in 3,753 households. The most populous of its eight villages was Ojak Sar, with 3,511 people.

=== Other villages in the rural district ===
- Aliabad
- Mian Dasht
- Rudbast
- Sadat Mahalleh-ye Rudbast
- Shahrak-e Darya Kenar
- Shurak
