= Narimani-ye Olya =

Village in Razavi Khorasan province, Iran

Narimani-ye Olya Persian: نريماني عليا
- Village
- Location within Iran
- Coordinates: 35°58′50″N 60°04′34″E
- Country: Iran
- Province: Razavi Khorasan
- County: Mashhad
- District: Razaviyeh
- Rural District: Abravan

Population (2016)
  - Total: 2,483
- Time zone: UTC+3:30 (IRST)

Narimani-ye Olya (Persian: نريماني عليا) (Note: Also romanized as Narīmānī-ye ‘Olyā) is a village in Abravan Rural District of Razaviyeh District in Mashhad County, Razavi Khorasan province, Iran.

== Demographics ==
=== Population ===
At the time of the 2006 National Census, the village's population was 1,914 in 440 households. The following census in 2011 counted 2,049 people in 541 households. The 2016 census measured the population of the village as 2,483 people in 690 households, the most populous in its rural district.
