= Jar Khoshk-e Sofla =

Village in Razavi Khorasan province, Iran

Jar Khoshk-e Sofla Persian: جرخشك سفلي
- Village
- Location within Iran
- Coordinates: 35°56′00″N 60°16′38″E
- Country: Iran
- Province: Razavi Khorasan
- County: Mashhad
- District: Razaviyeh
- Rural District: Pain Velayat

Population (2016)
  - Total: 293
- Time zone: UTC+3:30 (IRST)

Jar Khoshk-e Sofla (Persian: جرخشك سفلي) (Note: Also romanized as Jar Khoshk-e Soflá; also known as Jar Khoshk-e Pā’īn) is a village in Pain Velayat Rural District of Razaviyeh District in Mashhad County, Razavi Khorasan province, Iran.

== Demographics ==
=== Population ===
At the time of the 2006 National Census, the village's population was 296 in 72 households. The following census in 2011 counted 297 people in 78 households. The 2016 census measured the population of the village as 293 people in 86 households.
