= Meyami, Razavi Khorasan =

Village in Razavi Khorasan province, Iran

Meyami Persian: ميامي
- Village
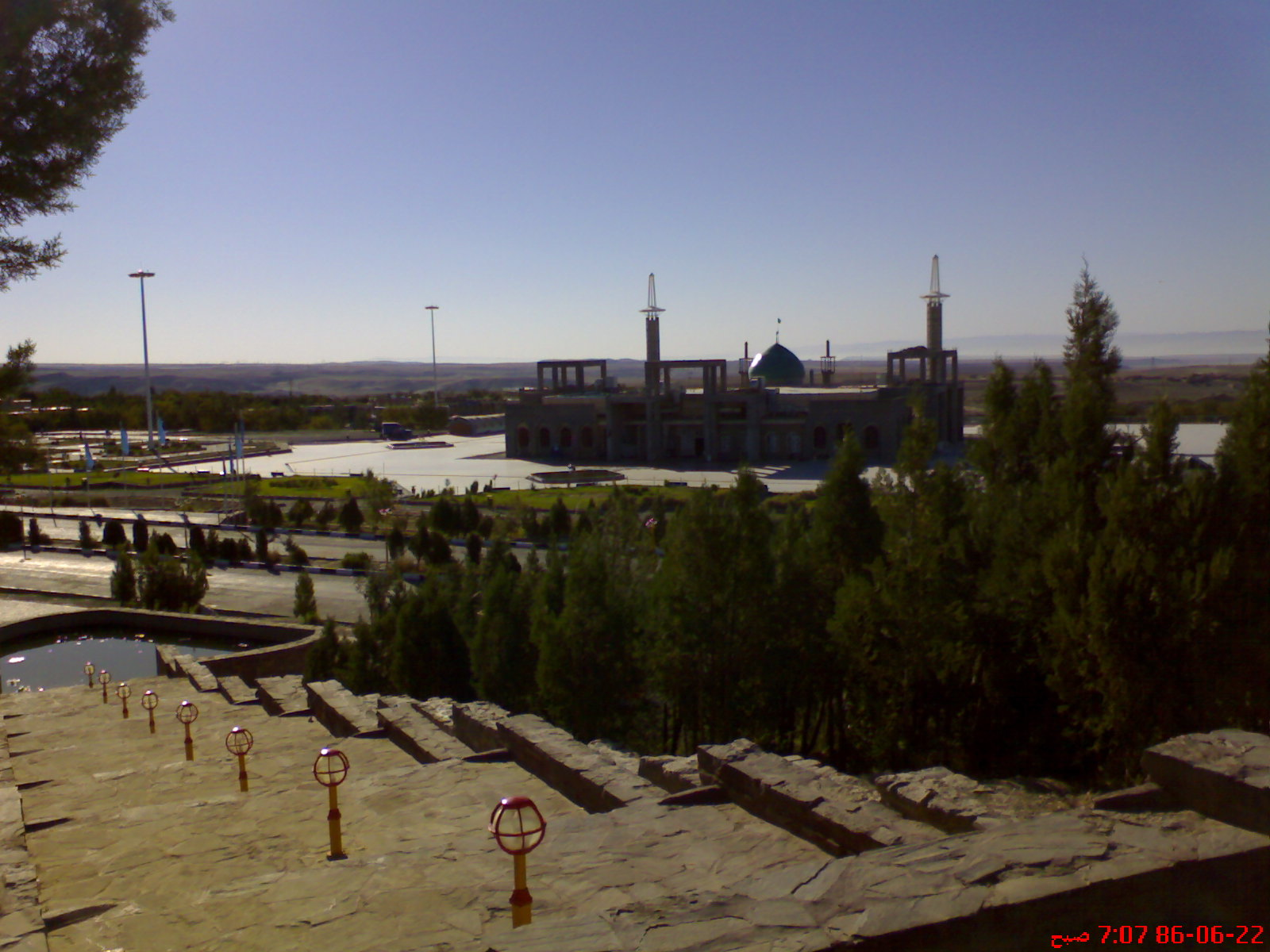

- Location within Iran
- Coordinates: 36°14′47″N 60°07′38″E
- Country: Iran
- Province: Razavi Khorasan
- County: Mashhad
- District: Razaviyeh
- Rural District: Meyami

Population (2016)
  - Total: 2,353
- Time zone: UTC+3:30 (IRST)

Meyami (Persian: میامی) (Note: Also romanized as Meyāmey, Meyāmī, and Miami; also known as Maiāmai and Mayāmey) is a village in Meyami Rural District of Razaviyeh District in Mashhad County, Razavi Khorasan province, Iran.

== Demographics ==
=== Population ===
At the time of the 2006 National Census, the village's population was 634 in 150 households. The following census in 2011 counted 2,331 people in 628 households. The 2016 census measured the population of the village as 2,353 people in 678 households.
