= Rudbast, Iran =

Village in Mazandaran province, Iran

Rudbast Persian: رود بست
- Village
- Location within Iran
- Coordinates: 36°40′00″N 52°36′00″E
- Country: Iran
- Province: Mazandaran
- County: Babolsar
- District: Central
- Rural District: Babolrud

Population (2016)
  - Total: 2,150
- Time zone: UTC+3:30 (IRST)

Rudbast (Persian: رودبست) (Note: Also romanized as Rūdbast; formerly known as Gavzan Mahalleh-ye Rudbast (گاوزن محله رودبست), also romanized as Gavzan Maḩalleh-ye Rūdbast; also known as Gāv Zan Kolā and Gavzan Maḩalleh) is a village in Babolrud Rural District of the Central District in Babolsar County, Mazandaran province, Iran.

== Demographics ==
=== Population ===
At the time of the 2006 National Census, the village's population, as Gavzan Mahalleh-ye Rudbast, was 2,036 in 547 households. The following census in 2011 counted 2,269 people in 710 households. The 2016 census measured the population of the village as 2,150 people in 720 households, by which time it was listed as Rudbast.
