= Shurak-e Maleki =

Village in Razavi Khorasan province, Iran

Shurak-e Maleki Persian: شورك ملكي
- Village
- Location within Iran
- Coordinates: 36°04′08″N 60°13′19″E
- Country: Iran
- Province: Razavi Khorasan
- County: Mashhad
- District: Razaviyeh
- Rural District: Pain Velayat

Population (2016)
  - Total: 1,151
- Time zone: UTC+3:30 (IRST)

Shurak-e Maleki (Persian: شورك ملكي) (Note: Also romanized as Shūrak Malekī and Shūrak-e Malekī; also known as Shorak) is a village in Pain Velayat Rural District of Razaviyeh District in Mashhad County, Razavi Khorasan province, Iran.

== Demographics ==
=== Population ===
At the time of the 2006 National Census, the village's population was 955 in 219 households. The following census in 2011 counted 1,134 people in 282 households. The 2016 census measured the population of the village as 1,151 people in 310 households, the most populous in its rural district.
