= Razaviyeh =

City in Razavi Khorasan province, Iran

Razaviyeh Persian: رضویه
- City
- Location within Iran
- Coordinates: 36°12′25″N 59°46′15″E
- Country: Iran
- Province: Razavi Khorasan
- County: Mashhad
- District: Razaviyeh

Population (2016)
  - Total: 8,850
- Time zone: UTC+3:30 (IRST)
- Website: razaviehcity.ir

Razaviyeh (Persian: رضویه) (Note: Also romanized as Raz̤avīyeh) is a city in, and the capital of, Razaviyeh District of Mashhad County, Razavi Khorasan province, Iran. It also serves as the administrative center for Meyami Rural District. The previous capital of the rural district was the village of Kenevist.

== Demographics ==
=== Population ===
At the time of the 2006 National Census, the city's population was 2,785 in 697 households. The following census in 2011 counted 4,542 people in 1,292 households. The 2016 census measured the population of the city as 8,850 people in 2,586 households.
