= Chehel Man Sang-e Olya =

Village in Razavi Khorasan province, Iran

Chehel Man Sang-e Olya Persian: چهل من سنگ عليا
- Village
- Location within Iran
- Coordinates: 35°52′51″N 60°02′40″E
- Country: Iran
- Province: Razavi Khorasan
- County: Mashhad
- District: Razaviyeh
- Rural District: Abravan

Population (2016)
  - Total: 71
- Time zone: UTC+3:30 (IRST)

Chehel Man Sang-e Olya (Persian: چهل من سنگ عليا) (Note: Also romanized as Chehel Man Sang-e 'Olyā; also known as Chehel Man Sang-e Bālā (چهل من سنگ بالا), Chelmeh Sang Bālā, Chelmeh Sang-e Bālā, Chelmeh Sang-e 'Olyā, Chelmen Sang-e Bālā, Chelmen Sang-e Olya, and Chelmen Sang-e 'Olyā) is a village in Abravan Rural District of Razaviyeh District in Mashhad County, Razavi Khorasan province, Iran.

== Demographics ==
=== Population ===
At the time of the 2006 National Census, the village's population was 55 in 13 households. The following census in 2011 counted 26 people in eight households. The 2016 census measured the population of the village as 71 people in 25 households.
