= Narimani-ye Sofla =

Village in Razavi Khorasan province, Iran

Narimani-ye Sofla Persian: نريماني سفلي
- Village
- Location within Iran
- Coordinates: 35°59′01″N 60°04′31″E
- Country: Iran
- Province: Razavi Khorasan
- County: Mashhad
- District: Razaviyeh
- Rural District: Abravan

Population (2016)
  - Total: 1,772
- Time zone: UTC+3:30 (IRST)

Narimani-ye Sofla (Persian: نريماني سفلي) (Note: Also romanized as Narīmānī Soflá and Narīmānī-ye Soflá; also known as Narīmānī) is a village in Abravan Rural District of Razaviyeh District in Mashhad County, Razavi Khorasan province, Iran.

== Demographics ==
=== Population ===
At the time of the 2006 National Census, the village's population was 1,512 in 394 households. The following census in 2011 counted 1,534 people in 426 households. The 2016 census measured the population of the village as 1,772 people in 502 households.
