= Abravan, Mashhad =

Village in Razavi Khorasan province, Iran

Abravan Persian: ابروان
- Village
- Location within Iran
- Coordinates: 36°04′34″N 59°58′38″E
- Country: Iran
- Province: Razavi Khorasan
- County: Mashhad
- District: Razaviyeh
- Rural District: Abravan

Population (2016)
  - Total: 1,067
- Time zone: UTC+3:30 (IRST)

Abravan (Persian: ابروان) (Note: Also romanized as Ābravān; also known as Adowar and Qahveh Khāneh-ye Ābravān) is a village in, and the capital of, Abravan Rural District in Razaviyeh District of Mashhad County, Razavi Khorasan province, Iran.

== Demographics ==
=== Population ===
At the time of the 2006 National Census, the village's population was 989 in 246 households. The following census in 2011 counted 1,084 people in 310 households. The 2016 census measured the population of the village as 1,067 people in 316 households.
