= Khar Zar =

- Location in Afghanistan
- Coordinates: 34°17′N 67°42′E
- Country: Afghanistan
- Province: Bamyan Province
- Time zone: + 4.30

Khar Zar is a village in Bamyan Province in central Afghanistan.

== Notable people from Khar Zar ==
- Mir Yazdanbakhsh, a powerful Hazara chieftain of the early 19th century.

== See also ==
- Bamyan Province
