= Baz Howz-e Olya =

Baz Howz-e Olya بازحوض عليا
- Village
- Location within Iran
- Coordinates: 36°03′20″N 59°33′32″E
- Country: Iran
- Province: Razavi Khorasan
- County: Mashhad
- Bakhsh: Ahmadabad
- Rural District: Sarjam

Population (2006)
  - Total: 297
- Time zone: UTC+3:30 (IRST)
  - Summer (DST): UTC+4:30 (IRDT)

Baz Howz-e Olya (Persian: بازحوض عليا, also Romanized as Baz Ḩowz̤-e ‘Olyā; also known as Bāz Ḩowz-e Bālā, Bazeh Ḩowz-e Bālā, Bazeh Ḩowz-e ‘Olyā, and Bāz Howz-e Bālā) is a village in Sarjam Rural District, Ahmadabad District, Mashhad County, Razavi Khorasan Province, Iran. At the 2006 census, its population was 297, in 66 families.
