= Shurak, Mazandaran =

Village in Mazandaran province, Iran

Shurak Persian: شورك
- Village
- Location within Iran
- Coordinates: 36°39′54″N 52°39′30″E
- Country: Iran
- Province: Mazandaran
- County: Babolsar
- District: Central
- Rural District: Babolrud

Population (2016)
  - Total: 726
- Time zone: UTC+3:30 (IRST)

Shurak (Persian: شورك) (Note: Also romanized as Shūrak and Shūrek) is a village in Babolrud Rural District of the Central District in Babolsar County, Mazandaran province, Iran.

== Demographics ==
=== Population ===
At the time of the 2006 National Census, the village's population was 711 in 188 households. The following census in 2011 counted 755 people in 232 households. The 2016 census measured the population of the village as 726 people in 241 households.
