= Kharzar, Fariman =

Village in Razavi Khorasan, Iran

Kharzar خارزار
- Village
- Location within Iran
- Coordinates: 35°33′27″N 59°50′04″E
- Country: Iran
- Province: Razavi Khorasan
- County: Fariman
- Bakhsh: Qalandarabad
- Rural District: Qalandarabad

Population (2006)
  - Total: 50
- Time zone: UTC+3:30 (IRST)
  - Summer (DST): UTC+4:30 (IRDT)

Kharzar (Persian: خارزار, also Romanized as Khārzār; also known as Kalāteh-ye Morād and Khār Zād) is a village in Qalandarabad Rural District, Qalandarabad District, Fariman County, Razavi Khorasan Province, Iran. At the 2006 census, its population was 50, in 13 families.
