= Shurak, Khash =

Shurak شورك
- Village
- Location within Iran
- Coordinates: 27°40′14″N 61°00′39″E
- Country: Iran
- Province: Sistan and Baluchestan
- County: Khash
- Bakhsh: Irandegan
- Rural District: Kahnuk

Population (2006)
  - Total: 47
- Time zone: UTC+3:30 (IRST)
  - Summer (DST): UTC+4:30 (IRDT)

Shurak (Persian: شورك, also Romanized as Shūrak; also known as Shūrag and Shūrāz) is a village in Kahnuk Rural District, Irandegan District, Khash County, Sistan and Baluchestan Province, Iran. At the 2006 census, its population was 47, in 10 families.
