= Miyandasht Rural District =

Miyandasht Rural District (Persian: دهستان مياندشت) may refer to various places in Iran:

- Miyandasht Rural District (Isfahan Province)
- Miyandasht Rural District (Darmian County), South Khorasan province

See also:

- Miyan Dasht Rural District, Jajrom County, North Khorasan province
