= Saheli Rural District =

Rural district in Mazandaran province, Iran

Saheli Rural District Persian: دهستان ساحلي
- Rural District
- Location within Iran
- Coordinates: 36°42′N 52°41′E
- Country: Iran
- Province: Mazandaran
- County: Babolsar
- District: Central
- Established: 1995
- Capital: Baqer Tangeh

Population (2016)
  - Total: 9,351
- Time zone: UTC+3:30 (IRST)

Saheli Rural District (Persian: دهستان ساحلي) is in the Central District of Babolsar County, Mazandaran province, Iran. Its capital is the village of Baqer Tangeh.

== Demographics ==
=== Population ===
At the time of the 2006 National Census, the rural district's population was 7,695 in 2,082 households. There were 8,391 inhabitants in 2,399 households at the following census of 2011. The 2016 census measured the population of the rural district as 9,351 in 3,031 households. The most populous of its seven villages was Baqer Tangeh, with 6,213 people.

=== Other villages in the rural district ===
- Mirud
- Owksar
- Pain Ahmad Kola
- Radar Station
- Tazehabad
