= Gavzan Mahalleh, Babol Kenar =

Gavzan Mahalleh گاوزن محله
- Village
- Location within Iran
- Coordinates: 36°10′55″N 52°37′22″E
- Country: Iran
- Province: Mazandaran
- County: Babol
- Bakhsh: Babol Kenar
- Rural District: Babol Kenar

Population (2006)
  - Total: 472
- Time zone: UTC+3:30 (IRST)
  - Summer (DST): UTC+4:30 (IRDT)

Gavzan Mahalleh (Persian: گاوزن محله, also Romanized as Gāvzan Maḩalleh) is a village in Babol Kenar Rural District, Babol Kenar District, Babol County, Mazandaran Province, Iran. At the 2006 census, its population was 472, in 127 families.
