= Bukayr ibn Mahan =

Abu Hashim Bukayr ibn Mahan (died 744) was one of the chief leaders of the Hashimiyya movement and its propaganda that aimed to overthrow the Umayyad Caliphate. His exact role in the movement, as well as the movement's origins and aims, have been the subject of intense scholarly debate.

== Origin and early life ==
Bukayr was not Arab, but of Iranian origin. He possibly hailed from Sijistan, but some traditions give his place of birth as the village of Hurmuzfarrah, near the town of Merv in Khurasan. The historian Patricia Crone suggested that another leading figure of the Hashimiyya, Isa ibn Mahan, may have been Bukayr's brother.

Bukayr's father, and Bukayr after him, were mawali (clients) of the Banu Musliya tribe, which belonged to the Yaman or southern Arab tribal group. Bukayr's initial career was spent in service of the Umayyad Caliphate, initially fighting under Yazid ibn al-Muhallab in campaigns in Khurasan and Jurjan. He then served as secretary and translator for Sa'id ibn Amr al-Harashi, governor of Khurasan in 721–723, and then for al-Junayd ibn Abd al-Rahman, governor of Sind. At Sind, he was informed that his brother Yazid had died and left him a large fortune; upon news of this, Bukayr left his post and went to Kufa.

== Work in the Hashimiyya ==
Kufa was a hotbed of proto-Shi'a sentiment, and it was there that he was converted to the cause of the Hashimiyya.

== Sources ==
- Agha, Saleh Said (2011). "Bukayr b. Māhān". In Fleet, Kate; Krämer, Gudrun; Matringe, Denis; Nawas, John; Rowson, Everett (eds.). Encyclopaedia of Islam (3rd ed.). Brill Online. doi:10.1163/1573-3912_ei3_COM_23724. ISSN 1873-9830.
- Blankinship, Khalid Yahya, ed. (1989). The History of al-Ṭabarī, Volume XXV: The End of Expansion: The Caliphate of Hishām, A.D. 724–738/A.H. 105–120. SUNY Series in Near Eastern Studies. Albany, New York: State University of New York Press. ISBN 978-0-88706-569-9.
- Sharon, Moshe (1983). Black Banners from the East. The Establishment of the ʿAbbāsid State – Incubation of a Revolt. Jerusalem: The Magnes Press. ISBN 965-223-501-6.
- Sourdel, Dominique (1960). "Bukayr b. Māhān". In Gibb, H. A. R.; Kramers, J. H.; Lévi-Provençal, E.; Schacht, J.; Lewis, B. & Pellat, Ch. (eds.). The Encyclopaedia of Islam, Second Edition. Volume I: A–B. Leiden: E. J. Brill. pp. 1292–1293. doi:10.1163/1573-3912_islam_SIM_1506. OCLC 495469456.
