= Meyami Rural District (Mashhad County) =

Rural district in Razavi Khorasan province, Iran

Meyami Rural District Persian: دهستان ميامي
- Rural District
- Location within Iran
- Coordinates: 36°15′N 59°59′E
- Country: Iran
- Province: Razavi Khorasan
- County: Mashhad
- District: Razaviyeh
- Established: 1986
- Capital: Razaviyeh

Population (2016)
  - Total: 28,890
- Time zone: UTC+3:30 (IRST)

Meyami Rural District (Persian: دهستان ميامي) is in Razaviyeh District of Mashhad County, Razavi Khorasan province, Iran. It is administered from the city of Razaviyeh. The previous capital of the rural district was the village of Kenevist.

== Demographics ==
=== Population ===
At the time of the 2006 National Census, the rural district's population was 44,348 in 10,174 households. There were 25,070 inhabitants in 6,758 households at the following census of 2011. The 2016 census measured the population of the rural district as 28,890 in 8,049 households. The most populous of its 42 villages was Tappeh Salam, with 5,669 people.

=== Other villages in the rural district ===
- Chenarak
- Jimabad
- Meyami
- Qazqan
- Salarabad
- Tangal-e Shur-e Olya
