= Abravan Rural District =

Rural district in Razavi Khorasan province, Iran

Abravan Rural District Persian: دهستان آبروان
- Rural District
- Location within Iran
- Coordinates: 36°00′N 59°59′E
- Country: Iran
- Province: Razavi Khorasan
- County: Mashhad
- District: Razaviyeh
- Established: 1986
- Capital: Abravan

Population (2016)
  - Total: 14,905
- Time zone: UTC+3:30 (IRST)

Abravan Rural District (Persian: دهستان آبروان) is in Razaviyeh District of Mashhad County, Razavi Khorasan province, Iran. Its capital is the village of Abravan.

== Demographics ==
=== Population ===
At the time of the 2006 National Census, the rural district's population was 13,561 in 3,165 households. There were 14,209 inhabitants in 3,823 households at the following census of 2011. The 2016 census measured the population of the rural district as 14,905 in 4,288 households. The most populous of its 35 villages was Narimani-ye Olya, with 2,483 people.

=== Other villages in the rural district ===
- Ab Mal
- Arreh
- Chehel Man Sang-e Olya
- Chehel Man Sang-e Sofla
- Narimani-ye Sofla
- Soleymani
- Taqiabad
