= Pain Velayat Rural District (Mashhad County) =

Rural district in Razavi Khorasan province, Iran

Pain Velayat Rural District Persian: دهستان پائين ولايت
- Rural District
- Location within Iran
- Coordinates: 36°02′N 60°20′E
- Country: Iran
- Province: Razavi Khorasan
- County: Mashhad
- District: Razaviyeh
- Established: 1986
- Capital: Kalateh-ye Manar

Population (2016)
  - Total: 6,587
- Time zone: UTC+3:30 (IRST)

Pain Velayat Rural District (Persian: دهستان پائين ولايت) is in Razaviyeh District of Mashhad County, Razavi Khorasan province, Iran. Its capital is the village of Kalateh-ye Manar.

== Demographics ==
=== Population ===
At the time of the 2006 National Census, the rural district's population was 6,399 in 1,491 households. There were 6,348 inhabitants in 1,693 households at the following census of 2011. The 2016 census measured the population of the rural district as 6,587 in 1,873 households. The most populous of its 37 villages was Shurak-e Maleki, with 1,151 people.

=== Other villages in the rural district ===
- Chahak
- Gav Borj
- Jar Khoshk-e Sofla
- Kalateh-ye Mirza Jani
- Kharzar
- Qarneh-ye Sofla
