= Babolsar =

City in Mazandaran province, Iran

Babolsar Persian: بابلسر
- City
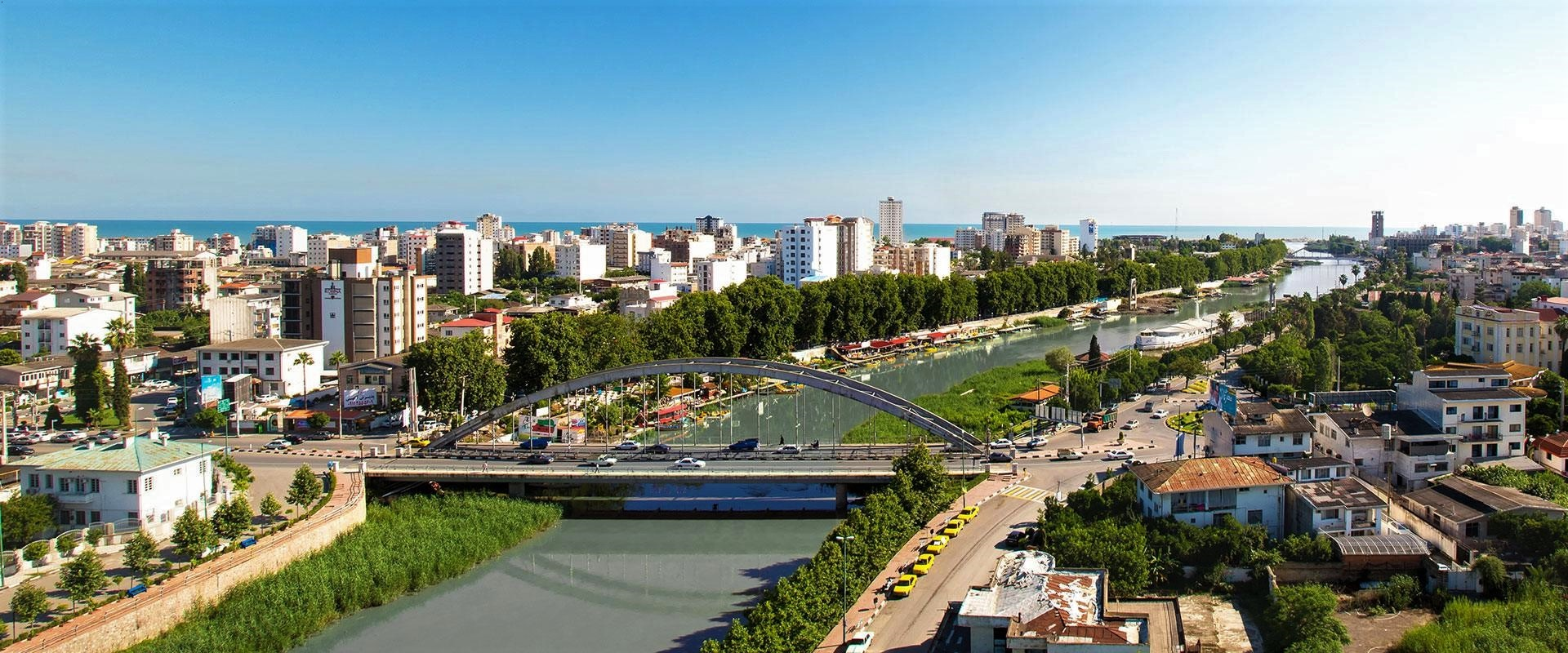
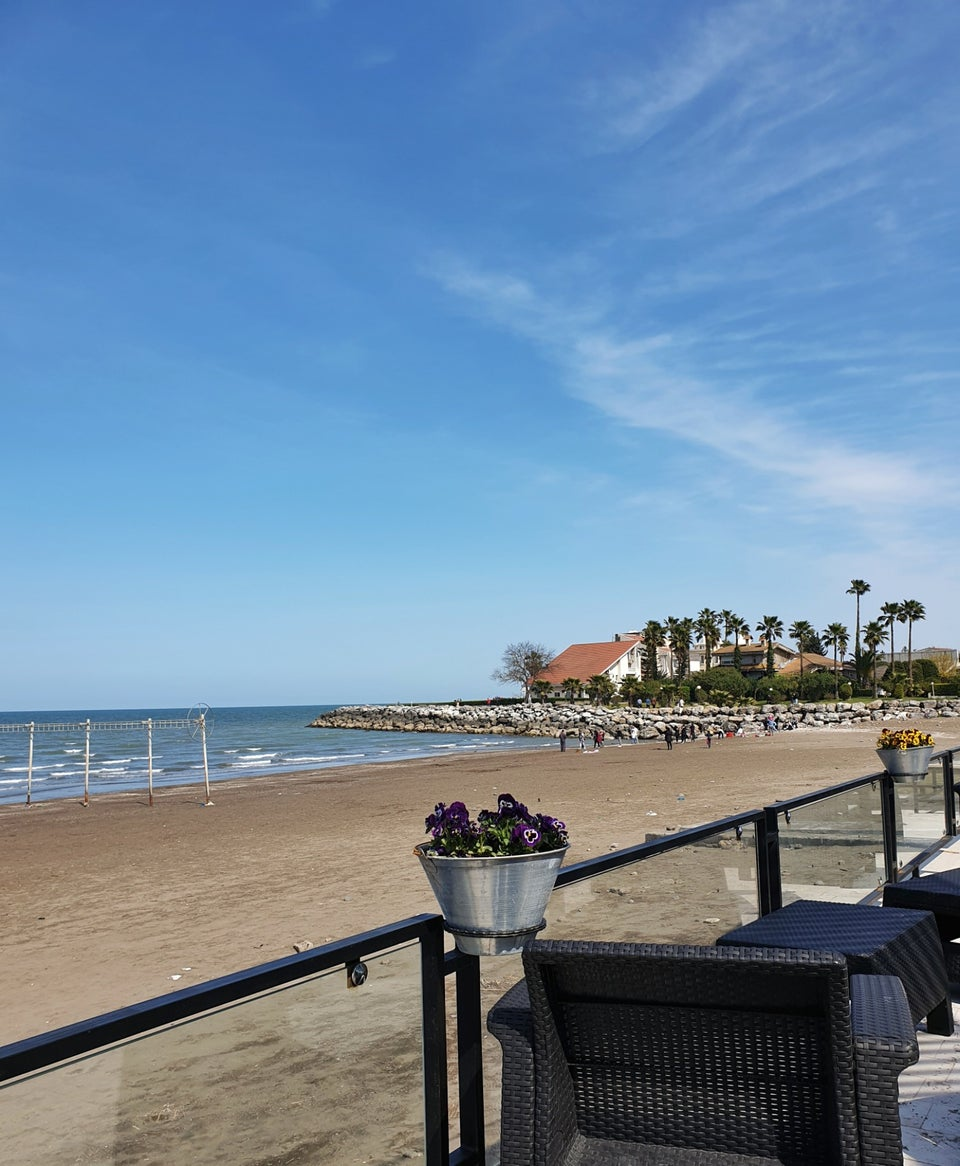
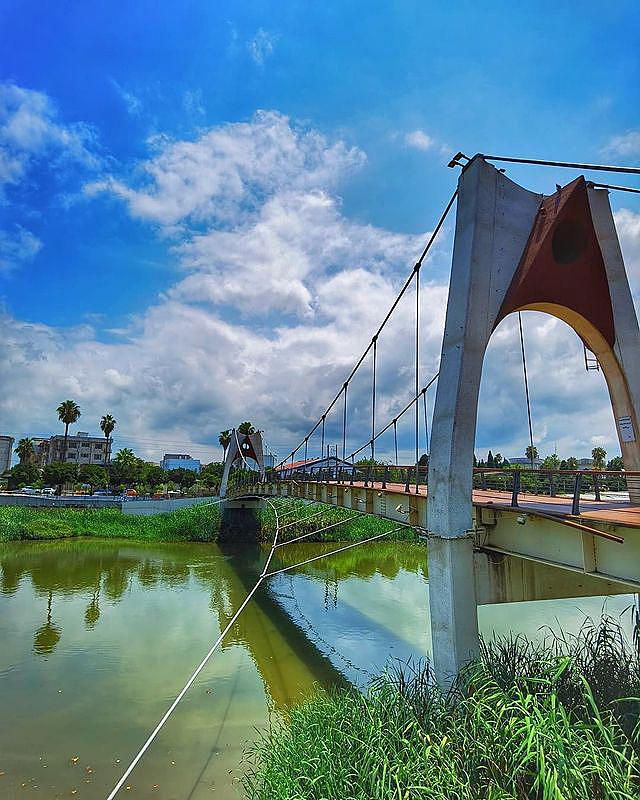
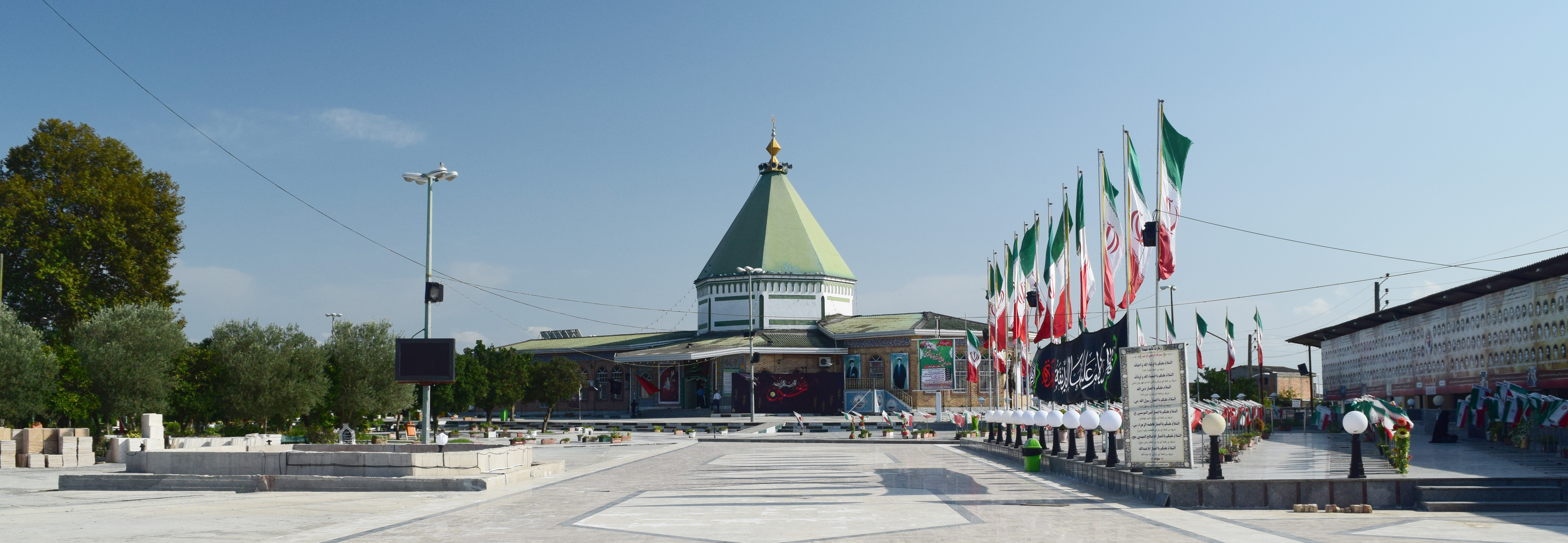
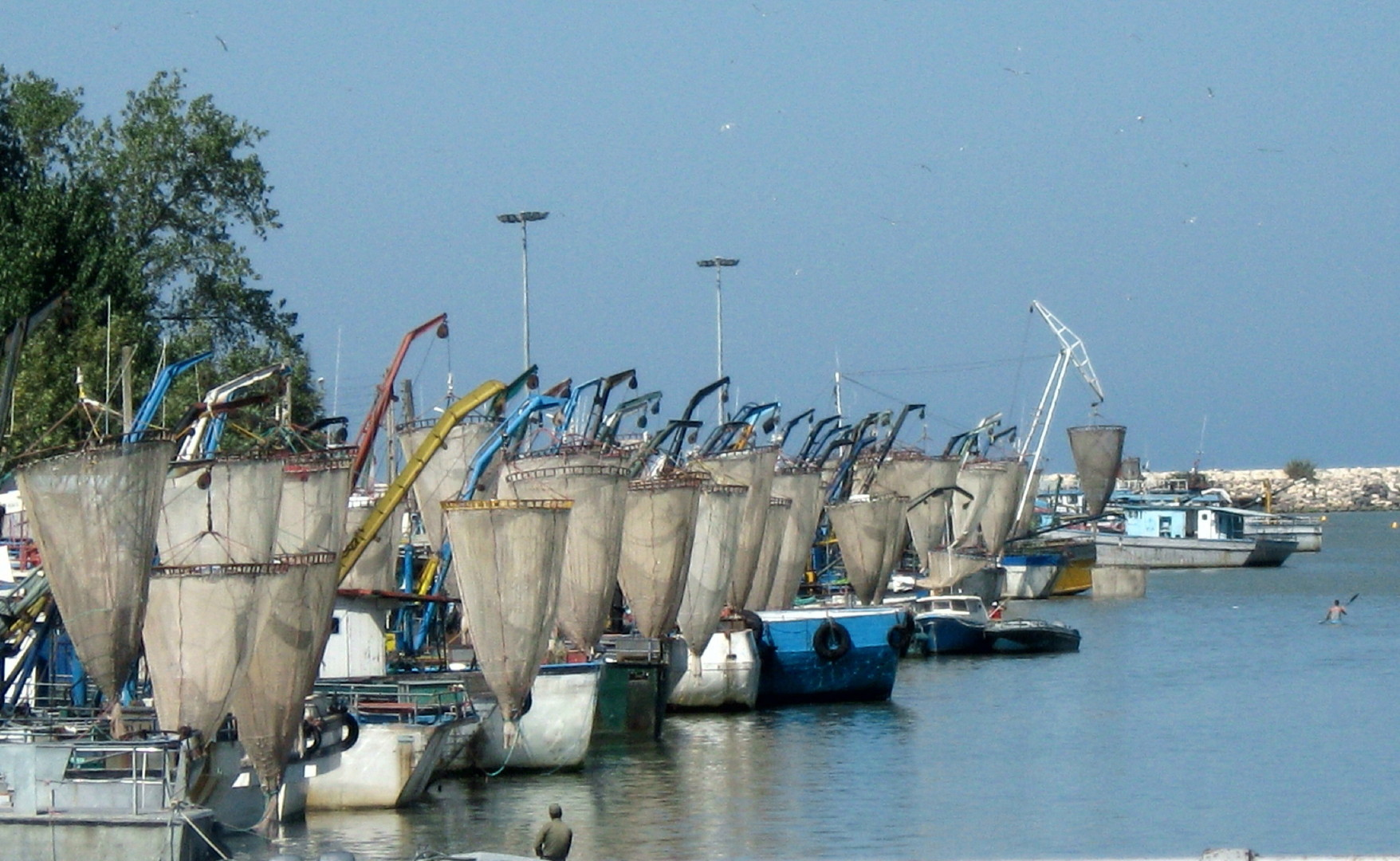
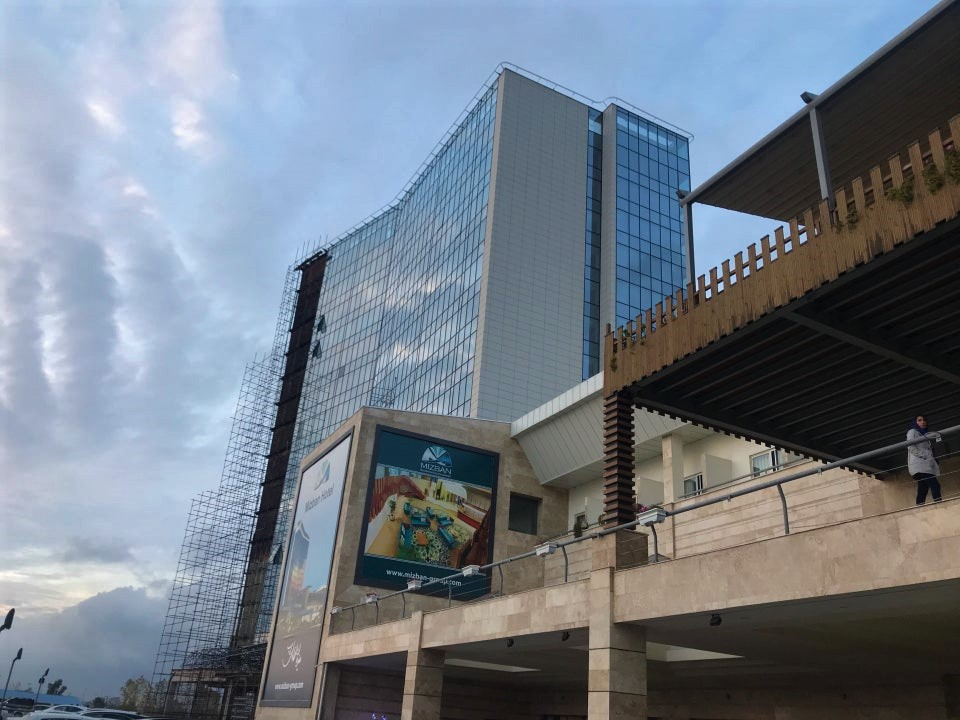

- Location within Iran
- Coordinates: 36°42′02″N 52°39′00″E
- Country: Iran
- Province: Mazandaran
- County: Babolsar
- District: Central

Population (2016)
  - Total: 59,966
- Time zone: UTC+3:30 (IRST)
- Area code: 011
- Website: www.babolsar.net

Babolsar (Persian: بابلسر) (Note: Also romanized as Bābolsar; also known as Bābul Sar; and Mashhadsar and Meshed-i-Sar (مَشهَدسَر), also romanized as Mashhad-i-Sar) is a city in the Central District of Babolsar County, Mazandaran province, Iran, serving as capital of both the county and the district. It is along the Caspian Sea.

== History ==
=== Ancient Era ===
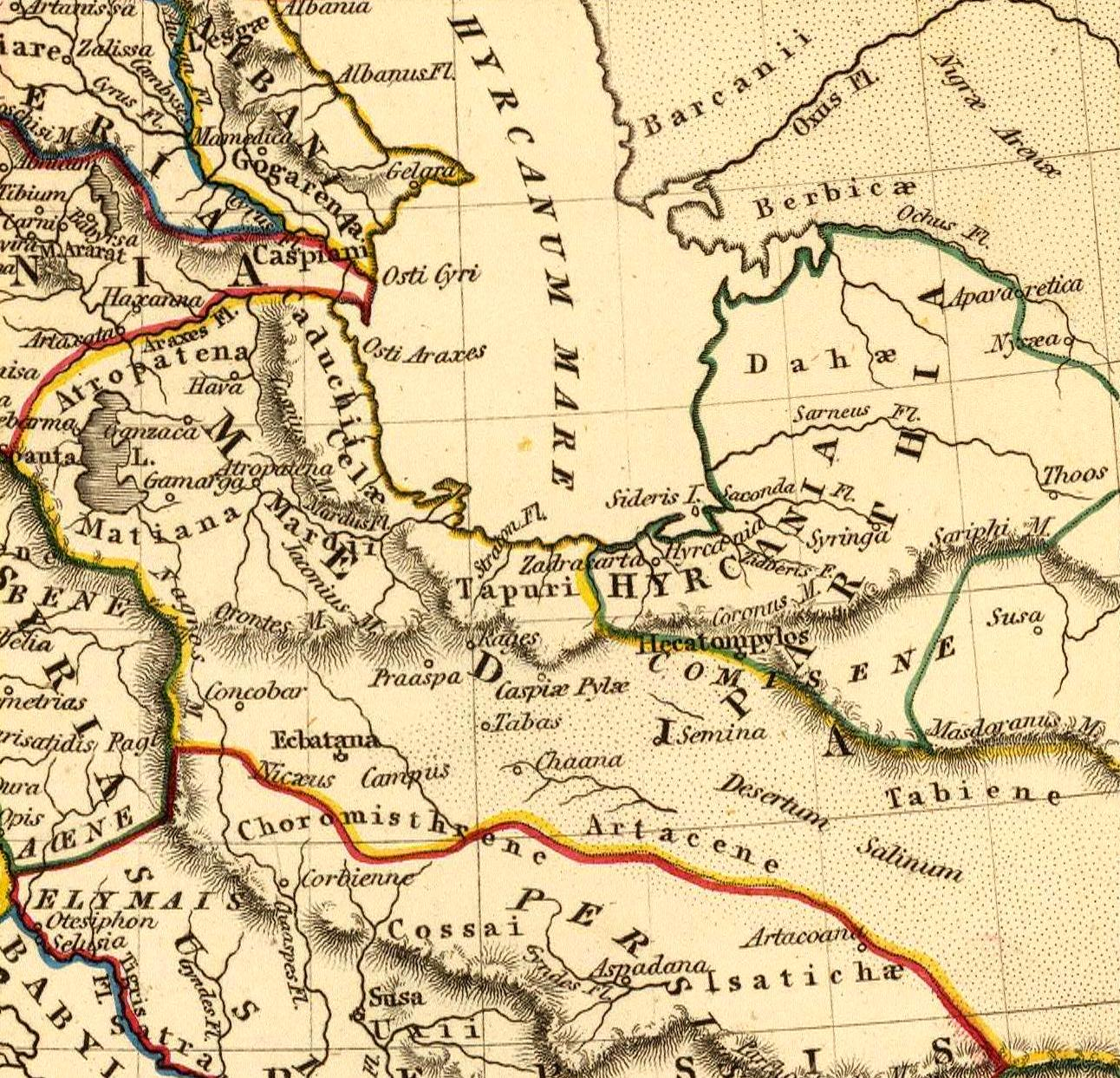
Location of the Tapurians in the 2nd century BCE, from east of the Sefidrud to Asram Hyrcania

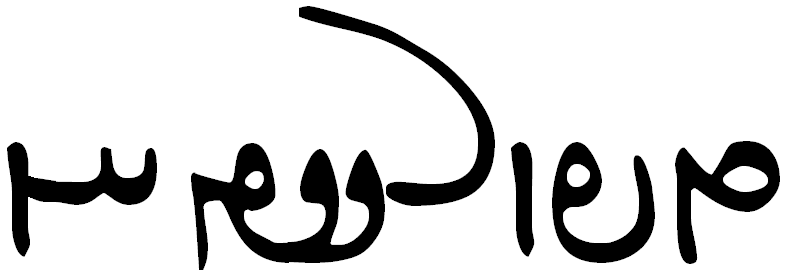
Before Islam, Mazandaran Province was called Tapuristan (in Pahlavi: ), derived from the name of the Tapuri tribe (in Greek: Τάπυροι). After the advent of Islam, they became known as the Tabari people, and their land was named Tabaristan. Historians believe that the Amardi were the first ancient inhabitants of Mazandaran, with the Amardi residing from Amol to Tonekabon and the Tapurians from Amol to Gorgan. During the Achaemenid Empire, the southern shores of the Caspian Sea were inhabited by the Tapurians, Amardi, Anariacae, and Cadusii. Historians have linked the Amardi to the Dahae, Scythians, and Persians.

Herodotus mentions the Mard tribe (mardes) alongside the Daens (daens), Dropiques (dropiques), and Sagartians (sagarties) as nomadic and desert-dwelling Persians. Pliny the Elder, a Greek historian, identified the location of the Amardi in the eastern part of Margania. Strabo (63 BCE) described the Amardi alongside the Tapurians, Cadusii, and Cyrtii as mountain-dwelling tribes of northern Iran. Strabo wrote: "All regions of this country are fertile except the part towards the north, which is mountainous and rugged and cold, the abode of the mountaineers called Cadusii, Amardi, Tapyri, Cyrtii, and other such peoples, who are migrants and predatory."

According to Vasily Bartold, the Tapurians lived in the southeastern part of the province and were under Achaemenid rule. The Amardi were defeated by Alexander the Great and later by the Parthians, who resettled them near Ray in the 2nd century BCE. The former lands of the Amardi were granted to the Tapurians. Ptolemy, in his description of Daylam (eastern Gilan), mentioned the Tapurians. According to Yahya Zoka, in "Karvand Kasravi," it is stated that the Amardi or Mardians, during Alexander the Great's campaign in Iran, resided in Mazandaran, and at that time, the Tapurians had not yet arrived. According to Mojtaba Minovi, the Amardi and Tapurians lived in Mazandaran Province, with the Tapurians residing in the mountainous areas and the Amardi in the plains. In 176 BCE, Phraates I of Parthia relocated the Amardi to the Khwar region, and the Tapurians took over the entire Mazandaran area, which was then named Tapuristan.

The city acquired its current name in 1927. The city's historic name is Mašhad-e Sar or Mashhadsar, meaning "the special way to Mashhad, referring to the only road connecting the northwest of Iran to the northeast, including Mashhad, which passed through Babolsar. By the 18th century, Babolsar had become a busy commercial port. During the reign of Nadir Shah, it was the base for Iran's Caspian fleet. By 1909, the port yielded 12 percent of the total customs revenue of Iran. However, by 1895, ports in Gilan were already competing with Babolsar.

During Reza Shah's reign, Babolsar lost much of its remaining trade to the new port of Bandar-e Shah at the terminus of the trans-Iranian railroad. The cargo handled at Babolsar in the years of 1935 and 1936 was only 25,000 tons. A modern quarter and a hotel were built during this period. The end of World War II brought a new era of vitality to the city as a summer seaside resort for people from Iran, which gave rise to a new phase of rapid expansion. Babolsar's population increased from about 3,500 in 1946 to 11,781 in 1966 and 18,810 in 1976.

== Demographics ==
=== Population ===
At the time of the 2006 National Census, the city's population was 47,872 in 13,442 households. The following census in 2011 counted 50,477 people in 15,583 households. The 2016 census measured the population of the city as 59,966 people in 19,576 households.

== Geography ==
=== Location ===
Babolsar is located on the southern coast of the Caspian Sea.The distance between Babolsar and Tehran (Iran's capital) is about 228 km, and it takes about 3.5 to 4 hours to reach this city. Since the Babol river passes through the city, both the bank of the river and the beach of the sea form tourist attractions in the city. The city is home to the major faculties of the University of Mazandaran.

=== Climate ===
Babolsar has a subtropical Mediterranean climate (Köppen: Csa, Trewartha: Cs), with hot, steamy, but mostly dry summers and cool winters. Rainfall may occur at any time of the year but is heaviest in autumn and winter.

Climate data for Babolsar (normals 1991-2020, extremes 1961-2023)
| Month | Jan | Feb | Mar | Apr | May | Jun | Jul | Aug | Sep | Oct | Nov | Dec | Year |
|---|---|---|---|---|---|---|---|---|---|---|---|---|---|
| Record high °C (°F) | 25.8 (78.4) | 29.6 (85.3) | 32.8 (91.0) | 38.5 (101.3) | 42.8 (109.0) | 37.4 (99.3) | 37.0 (98.6) | 39.0 (102.2) | 39.0 (102.2) | 34.0 (93.2) | 30.9 (87.6) | 25.6 (78.1) | 42.8 (109.0) |
| Mean daily maximum °C (°F) | 12.6 (54.7) | 12.3 (54.1) | 14.5 (58.1) | 18.5 (65.3) | 23.6 (74.5) | 27.9 (82.2) | 30.0 (86.0) | 30.5 (86.9) | 27.7 (81.9) | 23.4 (74.1) | 18.0 (64.4) | 14.2 (57.6) | 21.1 (70.0) |
| Daily mean °C (°F) | 8.5 (47.3) | 8.6 (47.5) | 11.0 (51.8) | 15.0 (59.0) | 20.5 (68.9) | 25.0 (77.0) | 27.0 (80.6) | 27.3 (81.1) | 24.3 (75.7) | 19.5 (67.1) | 13.8 (56.8) | 10.0 (50.0) | 17.5 (63.6) |
| Mean daily minimum °C (°F) | 5.4 (41.7) | 5.8 (42.4) | 8.5 (47.3) | 12.3 (54.1) | 17.6 (63.7) | 21.7 (71.1) | 23.4 (74.1) | 23.6 (74.5) | 20.9 (69.6) | 16.0 (60.8) | 10.6 (51.1) | 6.9 (44.4) | 14.4 (57.9) |
| Record low °C (°F) | −7.0 (19.4) | −4.0 (24.8) | −2.0 (28.4) | 1.0 (33.8) | 6.0 (42.8) | 9.0 (48.2) | 15.0 (59.0) | 16.0 (60.8) | 9.0 (48.2) | 4.0 (39.2) | −2.8 (27.0) | −3.0 (26.6) | −7.0 (19.4) |
| Average precipitation mm (inches) | 104.2 (4.10) | 72.3 (2.85) | 58.4 (2.30) | 33.2 (1.31) | 16.0 (0.63) | 24.5 (0.96) | 31.4 (1.24) | 40.2 (1.58) | 104.1 (4.10) | 140.1 (5.52) | 165.1 (6.50) | 119.8 (4.72) | 909.3 (35.81) |
| Average snowfall cm (inches) | 8.1 (3.2) | 0.3 (0.1) | 0.2 (0.1) | 0.0 (0.0) | 0.0 (0.0) | 0.0 (0.0) | 0.0 (0.0) | 0.0 (0.0) | 0.0 (0.0) | 0.0 (0.0) | 0.0 (0.0) | 0.1 (0.0) | 8.7 (3.4) |
| Average precipitation days (≥ 1.0mm) | 8.5 | 7.5 | 6.8 | 4.6 | 3 | 2.6 | 3.2 | 4.4 | 6.3 | 7.1 | 8.9 | 8.2 | 71.1 |
| Average rainy days | 10.3 | 10.1 | 10.7 | 7.6 | 4.5 | 3 | 4.1 | 4.8 | 6.1 | 7.9 | 9.8 | 10.1 | 89 |
| Average snowy days | 0.2 | 0.1 | 0 | 0 | 0 | 0 | 0 | 0 | 0 | 0 | 0 | 0.1 | 0.4 |
| Average relative humidity (%) | 83 | 82 | 82 | 80 | 78 | 75 | 76 | 77 | 79 | 82 | 83 | 84 | 80 |
| Average dew point °C (°F) | 5.6 (42.1) | 5.6 (42.1) | 7.9 (46.2) | 11.4 (52.5) | 16.3 (61.3) | 20.0 (68.0) | 22.3 (72.1) | 22.8 (73.0) | 20.4 (68.7) | 16.1 (61.0) | 10.9 (51.6) | 7.3 (45.1) | 13.9 (57.0) |
| Mean monthly sunshine hours | 122 | 110 | 135 | 164 | 225 | 258 | 246 | 239 | 189 | 168 | 129 | 110 | 2,095 |
Source: NOAA NCEI (Note: Rainy days shows parameter 71: Number of days with rain/drizzle)(1961-1990 extremes), (Snow 1981-2010), meteomanz

Climate data for Babolsar (1961-1990)
| Month | Jan | Feb | Mar | Apr | May | Jun | Jul | Aug | Sep | Oct | Nov | Dec | Year |
|---|---|---|---|---|---|---|---|---|---|---|---|---|---|
| Mean daily maximum °C (°F) | 11.7 (53.1) | 11.5 (52.7) | 13.3 (55.9) | 18.2 (64.8) | 23.5 (74.3) | 27.8 (82.0) | 30.4 (86.7) | 30.1 (86.2) | 27.6 (81.7) | 22.9 (73.2) | 18.4 (65.1) | 14.2 (57.6) | 20.8 (69.4) |
| Daily mean °C (°F) | 7.6 (45.7) | 7.9 (46.2) | 10.0 (50.0) | 14.6 (58.3) | 19.7 (67.5) | 23.9 (75.0) | 26.3 (79.3) | 26.0 (78.8) | 23.5 (74.3) | 18.6 (65.5) | 13.9 (57.0) | 9.9 (49.8) | 16.8 (62.3) |
| Mean daily minimum °C (°F) | 3.6 (38.5) | 4.3 (39.7) | 6.8 (44.2) | 11.0 (51.8) | 15.9 (60.6) | 20.1 (68.2) | 22.3 (72.1) | 22.0 (71.6) | 19.4 (66.9) | 14.3 (57.7) | 9.5 (49.1) | 5.6 (42.1) | 12.9 (55.2) |
| Average precipitation mm (inches) | 96.1 (3.78) | 67.2 (2.65) | 67.2 (2.65) | 31.9 (1.26) | 19.3 (0.76) | 20.8 (0.82) | 25.1 (0.99) | 61.3 (2.41) | 82.2 (3.24) | 163.2 (6.43) | 119.3 (4.70) | 131.0 (5.16) | 884.6 (34.85) |
| Average rainy days | 10.7 | 9.6 | 11.5 | 8.2 | 6.3 | 4.7 | 4.9 | 7.9 | 7.8 | 9.0 | 9.1 | 10.6 | 100.3 |
| Average snowy days | 1 | 1 | 0.4 | 0 | 0 | 0 | 0 | 0 | 0 | 0.1 | 0 | 0.3 | 2.8 |
| Average relative humidity (%) | 86 | 85 | 85 | 83 | 80 | 77 | 78 | 80 | 82 | 84 | 86 | 87 | 83 |
| Average dew point °C (°F) | 4.7 (40.5) | 5.0 (41.0) | 7.1 (44.8) | 11.2 (52.2) | 15.6 (60.1) | 19.3 (66.7) | 21.7 (71.1) | 22.0 (71.6) | 19.7 (67.5) | 15.3 (59.5) | 10.9 (51.6) | 7.0 (44.6) | 13.3 (55.9) |
| Mean monthly sunshine hours | 124.7 | 119.4 | 126.5 | 162.0 | 214.2 | 242.4 | 237.9 | 205.0 | 181.5 | 161.4 | 136.9 | 122.4 | 2,034.3 |
Source: NOAA

== Tourist attractions ==
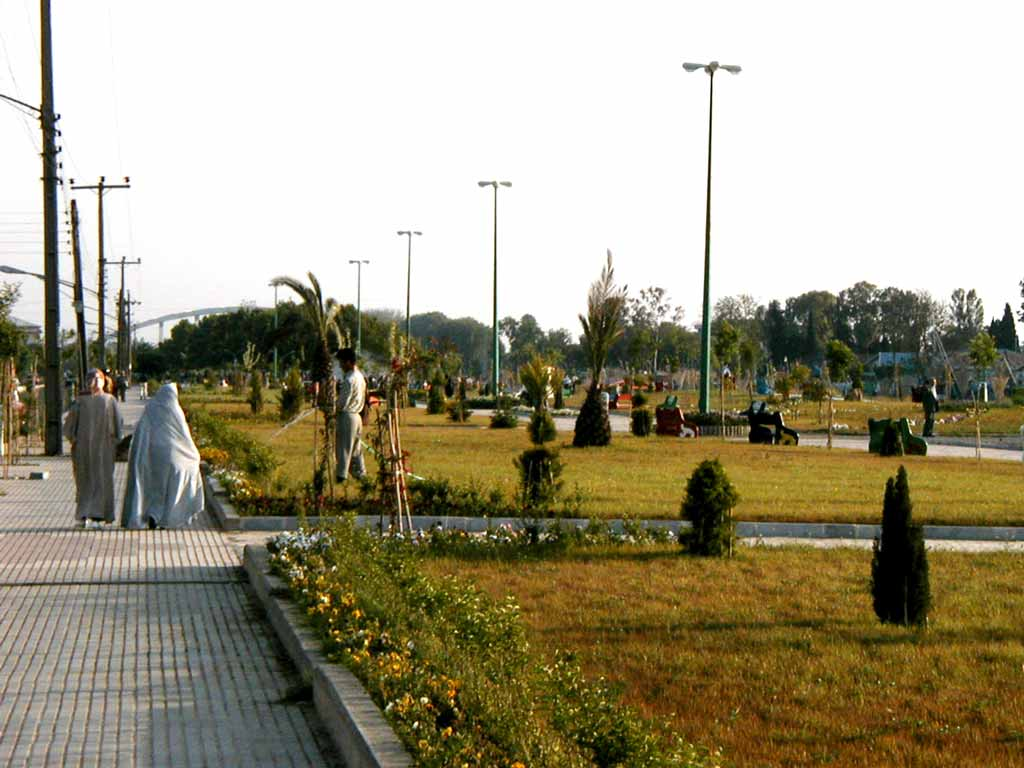
A park in Babolsar

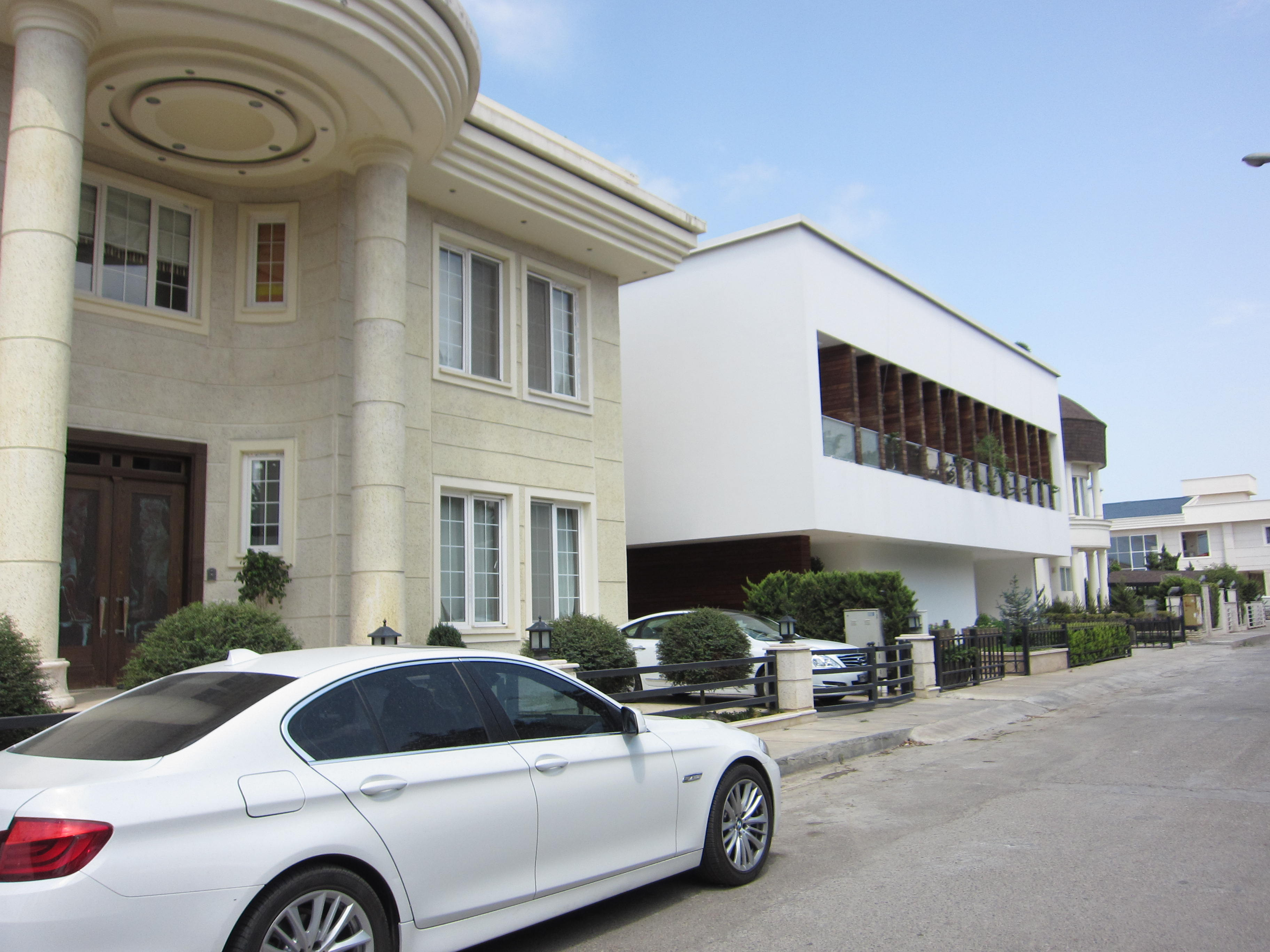
Khezer Shahr

Mouj residential opposite of 4th parking

Famous:

- Khezer shahr town
- Darya kenar town
- Palm shopping center line
- Persia shopping center
- Negin shopping center
- Pars mall
- Old car bridge
- Saheli boulevard
- Moalem green park
- Shora park
- Mizban hotel (5 star-4 star- sea side- hyperstar- shopping center)
- Nice bird watching
- Swimming parts
- Several walking and jogging path and cycling beside sea side
- Motor boat ride
- Amateur fishing
- Babolroud river
- Babol carpet shopping center
- Emamzadeh Ebrahim
- Two attractive old bazares
- Sea buses
- Tuesday street market
- Several old buildings
- Clock tower
- bowling- billiard center and tennis and padel courts
- Several residentials (Mouj- Sahel- Parasto- Dorna & ....)
- Stones wave catcher
- Nostalgic and memorable wall (Felestin St.)
- Azizak pond

Babolsar coastal boulevard

Along this 4-kilometer boulevard, room has been given for public sports, including jogging, street basketball, table tennis, and bicycle riding. There are also 10 beach parking lots, a hotel at the end of the boulevard, and other attractions.

Sea buses

One of the most important tourist attractions of Babolsar is the presence of sea bus stops next to Babolrud. These sea buses take tourists from Babolrud to the sea side and explore the sea for less than an hour.

Pedestrian cable-stayed bridge

The cable bridge measures 92 meters long and 5 meters wide, supported by two 18-meter pylons. From mid-autumn to late winter, large seagulls gather along the Babolrud River near the bridge, where visitors frequently feed them.

== Education ==
=== Universities ===
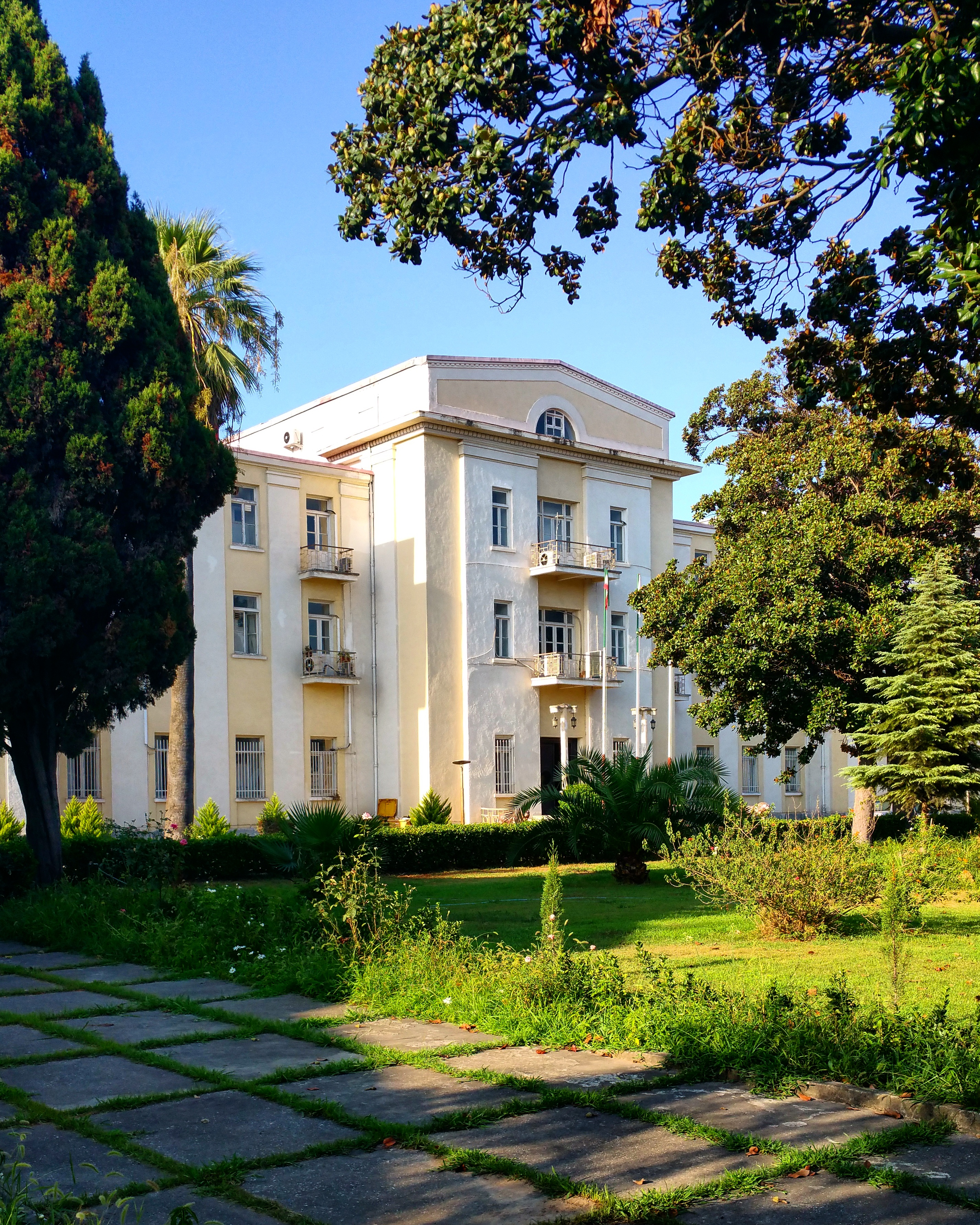
University of Mazandaran

University of Mazandaran (UMZ), currently the largest state higher education center in the province of Mazandaran, had formerly consisted of a number of tertiary education centers. In 1979 the centers were officially merged to form what is now known as University of Mazandaran. In recent years, UMZ has made significant progress, expanding itself with vision both qualitatively and quantitatively. It presently includes 12 faculties on its campus: Faculty of Mathematical Sciences, Faculty of Theology and Islamic Sciences, Faculty of Marine and Oceanic Sciences, Faculty of Basic Sciences, Faculty of Arts and Architecture, Faculty of Law and Political Sciences, Faculty of Physical Education and Sports Sciences, Faculty of Humanities and Social Sciences, Faculty of Economics and Administrative Sciences, Faculty of Chemistry, Faculty of Technology and Engineering, and Faculty of Cultural Heritage, Handicrafts and Tourism.

UMZ has now about 12,000 students who are currently studying at undergraduate, graduate, and post-graduate levels and over 400 faculty members teaching and researching at different faculties of the university.

== Sister city ==
- (Italy) Gaeta

== Notable people ==
- Irene Zazians (1927–2012), Iranian-Armenian actress

== See also ==
Babolsar travel guide from Wikivoyage
