= Central District (Babolsar County) =

District in Mazandaran province, Iran

Central District (Babolsar County) Persian: بخش مرکزی شهرستان بابلسر
- District
- Location within Iran
- Coordinates: 36°42′N 52°39′E
- Country: Iran
- Province: Mazandaran
- County: Babolsar
- Established: 1989
- Capital: Babolsar

Population (2016)
  - Total: 80,561
- Time zone: UTC+3:30 (IRST)

The Central District of Babolsar County (Persian: بخش مرکزی شهرستان بابلسر) is in Mazandaran province, Iran. Its capital is the city of Babolsar. The previous capital of the district was the village of Kalleh Bast (now the city of Hadishahr) in 1995.

== Demographics ==
=== Population ===
At the time of the 2006 National Census, the district's population was 67,211 in 18,650 households. The following census in 2011 counted 72,046 people in 22,049 households. The 2016 census measured the population of the district as 80,561 inhabitants in 26,360 households.

=== Administrative divisions ===
Central District (Babolsar County) Population
Administrative Divisions	2006	2011	2016
Babolrud RD	11,644	13,178	11,244
Saheli RD	7,695	8,391	9,351
Babolsar (city)	47,872	50,477	59,966
Total	67,211	72,046	80,561
RD = Rural District
