= Razaviyeh District =

District in Razavi Khorasan province, Iran

Razaviyeh District Persian: بخش رضویه
- District
- Location within Iran
- Coordinates: 36°06′N 60°08′E
- Country: Iran
- Province: Razavi Khorasan
- County: Mashhad
- Established: 1991
- Capital: Razaviyeh

Population (2016)
  - Total: 59,232
- Time zone: UTC+3:30 (IRST)

Razaviyeh District (Persian: بخش رضویه) is in Mashhad County, Razavi Khorasan province, Iran. It is administered from the city of Razaviyeh.

== Demographics ==
=== Population ===
At the time of the 2006 National Census, the district's population was 67,093 in 15,527 households. The following census in 2011 counted 50,169 people in 13,566 households. The 2016 census measured the population of the district as 59,232 inhabitants in 16,790 households.

=== Administrative divisions ===
Razaviyeh District Population
Administrative Divisions	2006	2011	2016
Abravan RD	13,561	14,209	14,905
Meyami RD	44,348	25,070	28,890
Pain Velayat RD	6,399	6,348	6,587
Razaviyeh (city)	2,785	4,542	8,850
Total	67,093	50,169	59,232
RD = Rural District
