= Nasirabad, Sari =

Village in Mazandaran province, Iran

Nasirabad Persian: نصيراباد
- Village
- Location within Iran
- Coordinates: 36°45′22″N 53°08′12″E
- Country: Iran
- Province: Mazandaran
- County: Sari
- District: Rudpey-ye Shomali
- Rural District: Farahabad-e Jonubi

Population (2016)
  - Total: 88
- Time zone: UTC+3:30 (IRST)

Nasirabad (Persian: نصيراباد) (Note: Also romanized as Naşīrābād) is a village in Farahabad-e Jonubi Rural District of Rudpey-ye Shomali District in Sari County, Mazandaran province, Iran.

== Demographics ==
=== Population ===
At the time of the 2006 National Census, the village's population was 100 in 24 households, when it was in Rudpey-ye Shomali Rural District (Note: Renamed Farahabad-e Shomali Rural District) of the Central District. The following census in 2011 counted 98 people in 27 households, by which time the rural district had been separated from the district in the formation of Rudpey District. The 2016 census measured the population of the village as 88 people in 30 households, when the rural district had been separated from the district in the formation of Rudpey-ye Shomali District and renamed Farahabad-e Shomali Rural District. The village was transferred to Farahabad-e Jonubi Rural District created in the new district.
