= Jorreh Sar =

Village in Mazandaran province, Iran

Jorreh Sar Persian: جره سر
- Village
- Location within Iran
- Coordinates: 36°40′12″N 52°51′00″E
- Country: Iran
- Province: Mazandaran
- County: Sari
- District: Rudpey-ye Shomali
- Rural District: Farahabad-e Jonubi

Population (2016)
  - Total: 379
- Time zone: UTC+3:30 (IRST)

Jorreh Sar (Persian: جره سر) (Note: Also known as Manzel Sar) is a village in Farahabad-e Jonubi Rural District of Rudpey-ye Shomali District in Sari County, Mazandaran province, Iran.

== Demographics ==
=== Population ===
At the time of the 2006 National Census, the village's population was 424 in 111 households, when it was in Rudpey-ye Shomali Rural District (Note: Renamed Farahabad-e Shomali Rural District) of the Central District. The following census in 2011 counted 379 people in 114 households, by which time the rural district had been separated from the district in the formation of Rudpey District. The 2016 census measured the population of the village as 379 people in 133 households, when the rural district had been separated from the district in the formation of Rudpey-ye Shomali District and renamed Farahabad-e Shomali Rural District. The village was transferred to Farahabad-e Jonubi Rural District created in the new district.
