= Muzi Bagh =

Village in Mazandaran province, Iran

Muzi Bagh Persian: موزی باغ
- Village
- Location within Iran
- Coordinates: 36°44′49″N 53°08′10″E
- Country: Iran
- Province: Mazandaran
- County: Sari
- District: Rudpey-ye Shomali
- Rural District: Farahabad-e Jonubi

Population (2016)
  - Total: 372
- Time zone: UTC+3:30 (IRST)

Muzi Bagh (Persian: موزی باغ) (Note: Also romanized as Mūzī Bāgh) is a village in Farahabad-e Jonubi Rural District of Rudpey-ye Shomali District in Sari County, Mazandaran province, Iran.

== Demographics ==
=== Population ===
At the time of the 2006 National Census, the village's population was 346 in 84 households, when it was in Rudpey-ye Shomali Rural District (Note: Renamed Farahabad-e Shomali Rural District) of the Central District. The following census in 2011 counted 345 people in 104 households, by which time the rural district had been separated from the district in the formation of Rudpey District. The 2016 census measured the population of the village as 372 people in 130 households, when the rural district had been separated from the district in the formation of Rudpey-ye Shomali District and renamed Farahabad-e Shomali Rural District. The village was transferred to Farahabad-e Jonubi Rural District created in the new district.
