= Esfandan, Mazandaran =

Village in Mazandaran province, Iran

Esfandan Persian: اسفندان
- Village
- Location within Iran
- Coordinates: 36°44′15″N 53°07′05″E
- Country: Iran
- Province: Mazandaran
- County: Sari
- District: Rudpey-ye Shomali
- Rural District: Farahabad-e Jonubi

Population (2016)
  - Total: 973
- Time zone: UTC+3:30 (IRST)

Esfandan (Persian: اسفندان) (Note: Also romanized as Esfandān; also known as Esfandān-e Bālā) is a village in Farahabad-e Jonubi Rural District of Rudpey-ye Shomali District in Sari County, Mazandaran province, Iran.

== Demographics ==
=== Population ===
At the time of the 2006 National Census, the village's population was 598 in 150 households, when it was in Rudpey-ye Shomali Rural District (Note: Renamed Farahabad-e Shomali Rural District) of the Central District. The following census in 2011 counted 617 people in 183 households, by which time the rural district had been separated from the district in the formation of Rudpey District. The 2016 census measured the population of the village as 973 people in 182 households, when the rural district had been separated from the district in the formation of Rudpey-ye Shomali District and renamed Farahabad-e Shomali Rural District. The village was transferred to Farahabad-e Jonubi Rural District created in the new district. Esfandan and the village of Panbeh Chuleh-ye Pain (with the same number of people), were the most populous villages in their rural district.
