= Eslamdeh =

Village in Mazandaran province, Iran

Eslamdeh Persian: اسلام ده
- Village
- Location within Iran
- Country: Iran
- Province: Mazandaran
- County: Sari
- District: Rudpey-ye Shomali
- Rural District: Farahabad-e Jonubi

Population (2016)
  - Total: 226
- Time zone: UTC+3:30 (IRST)

Eslamdeh (Persian: اسلام ده) (Note: Also romanized as Eslāmdeh) is a village in Farahabad-e Jonubi Rural District of Rudpey-ye Shomali District in Sari County, Mazandaran province, Iran.

== Demographics ==
=== Population ===
At the time of the 2006 National Census, the village's population was 210 in 56 households, when it was in Rudpey-ye Shomali Rural District (Note: Renamed Farahabad-e Shomali Rural District) of the Central District. The following census in 2011 counted 234 people in 68 households, by which time the rural district had been separated from the district in the formation of Rudpey District. The 2016 census measured the population of the village as 226 people in 68 households, when the rural district had been separated from the district in the formation of Rudpey-ye Shomali District and renamed Farahabad-e Shomali Rural District. The village was transferred to Farahabad-e Jonubi Rural District created in the new district.
