= Kord Kheyl, Rudpey-ye Shomali =

Village in Mazandaran province, Iran

Kord Kheyl Persian: كردخيل
- Village
- Location within Iran
- Coordinates: 36°42′38″N 53°06′13″E
- Country: Iran
- Province: Mazandaran
- County: Sari
- District: Rudpey-ye Shomali
- Rural District: Farahabad-e Jonubi

Population (2016)
  - Total: 307
- Time zone: UTC+3:30 (IRST)

Kord Kheyl (Persian: كردخيل) is a village in Farahabad-e Jonubi Rural District of Rudpey-ye Shomali District in Sari County, Mazandaran province, Iran.

== Demographics ==
=== Population ===
At the time of the 2006 National Census, the village's population was 335 in 90 households, when it was in Rudpey-ye Shomali Rural District (Note: Renamed Farahabad-e Shomali Rural District) of the Central District. The following census in 2011 counted 301 people in 101 households, by which time the rural district had been separated from the district in the formation of Rudpey District. The 2016 census measured the population of the village as 307 people in 109 households, when the rural district had been separated from the district in the formation of Rudpey-ye Shomali District and renamed Farahabad-e Shomali Rural District. The village was transferred to Farahabad-e Jonubi Rural District created in the new district.
