= Seyyed Mahalleh, Sari =

Village in Mazandaran province, Iran

Seyyed Mahalleh Persian: سيد محله
- Village
- Location within Iran
- Coordinates: 36°42′49″N 53°00′21″E
- Country: Iran
- Province: Mazandaran
- County: Sari
- District: Rudpey
- Rural District: Rudpey-ye Gharbi

Population (2016)
  - Total: 1,544
- Time zone: UTC+3:30 (IRST)

Seyyed Mahalleh (Persian: سيدمحله) (Note: Also romanized as Seyyed Maḩalleh) is a village in Rudpey-ye Gharbi Rural District of Rudpey District in Sari County, Mazandaran province, Iran.

== Demographics ==
=== Population ===
At the time of the 2006 National Census, the village's population was 1,638 in 445 households, when it was in Rudpey-ye Jonubi Rural District (Note: Formerly Rudpey Rural District, renamed Rudpey-ye Sharqi Rural District) of the Central District. The following census in 2011 counted 1,618 people in 502 households, by which time the rural district had been separated from the district in the formation of Rudpey District. The 2016 census measured the population of the village as 1,544 people in 529 households, when it had been transferred to Rudpey-ye Gharbi Rural District created in the same district. It was the most populous village in its rural district.
