= Kharmian =

Village in Mazandaran province, Iran

Kharmian Persian: خارميان
- Village
- Location within Iran
- Coordinates: 36°38′35″N 53°01′55″E
- Country: Iran
- Province: Mazandaran
- County: Sari
- District: Rudpey
- Rural District: Rudpey-ye Gharbi

Population (2016)
  - Total: 870
- Time zone: UTC+3:30 (IRST)

Kharmian (Persian: خارميان) (Note: Also romanized as Khar Meyān, Khar Mīān, and Khārmīān) is a village in Rudpey-ye Gharbi Rural District of Rudpey District in Sari County, Mazandaran province, Iran.

== Demographics ==
=== Population ===
At the time of the 2006 National Census, the village's population was 892 in 230 households, when it was in Rudpey-ye Jonubi Rural District (Note: Formerly Rudpey Rural District, renamed Rudpey-ye Sharqi Rural District) of the Central District. The following census in 2011 counted 918 people in 279 households, by which time the rural district had been separated from the district in the formation of Rudpey District. The 2016 census measured the population of the village as 870 people in 299 households, when it had been transferred to Rudpey-ye Gharbi Rural District created in the same district.
