= Shirin Bul =

Village in Mazandaran province, Iran

Shirin Bul Persian: شيرين بول
- Village
- Location within Iran
- Coordinates: 36°46′07″N 52°59′54″E
- Country: Iran
- Province: Mazandaran
- County: Sari
- District: Rudpey-ye Shomali
- Rural District: Farahabad-e Shomali

Population (2016)
  - Total: 2,044
- Time zone: UTC+3:30 (IRST)

Shirin Bul (Persian: شيرين بول) (Note: Also romanized as Shīrīn Būl; also known as Shīrāmbol and Shīrīn Bol) is a village in Farahabad-e Shomali Rural District of Rudpey-ye Shomali District in Sari County, Mazandaran province, Iran.

== Demographics ==
=== Population ===
At the time of the 2006 National Census, the village's population was 158 in 45 households, when it was in Rudpey-ye Shomali Rural District (Note: Renamed Farahabad-e Shomali Rural District) of the Central District. The following census in 2011 counted 123 people in 33 households, by which time the rural district had been separated from the district in the formation of Rudpey District. The 2016 census measured the population of the village as 2,044 people in 51 households, when the rural district had been separated from the district in the formation of Rudpey-ye Shomali District and renamed Farahabad-e Shomali Rural District.
