= Nabiabad, Mazandaran =

Village in Mazandaran province, Iran

Nabiabad Persian: نبی آباد
- Village
- Location within Iran
- Coordinates: 36°48′00″N 53°05′22″E
- Country: Iran
- Province: Mazandaran
- County: Sari
- District: Rudpey-ye Shomali
- Rural District: Farahabad-e Shomali

Population (2016)
  - Total: 145
- Time zone: UTC+3:30 (IRST)

Nabiabad (Persian: نبی آباد) (Note: Also romanized as Nabīābād) is a village in Farahabad-e Shomali Rural District of Rudpey-ye Shomali District in Sari County, Mazandaran province, Iran.

== Demographics ==
=== Population ===
At the time of the 2006 National Census, the village's population was 50 in 14 households, when it was in Rudpey-ye Shomali Rural District (Note: Renamed Farahabad-e Shomali Rural District) of the Central District. The following census in 2011 counted 136 people in 62 households, by which time the rural district had been separated from the district in the formation of Rudpey District. The 2016 census measured the population of the village as 145 people in 60 households, when the rural district had been separated from the district in the formation of Rudpey-ye Shomali District and renamed Farahabad-e Shomali Rural District.
