= Muzi Bon =

Muzi Bon موزی بن
- Village
- Location within Iran
- Coordinates: 36°36′28″N 53°05′14″E
- Country: Iran
- Province: Mazandaran
- County: Sari
- Bakhsh: Rudpey
- Rural District: Rudpey-ye Sharqi

Population (2006)
  - Total: 246
- Time zone: UTC+3:30 (IRST)

Muzi Bon (Persian: موزی بن, also Romanized as Mūzī Bon) is a village in Rudpey-ye Sharqi Rural District, in the Rudpey District of Sari County, Mazandaran Province, Iran. At the 2016 census, its population was 237, in 83 families. Down from 246 in 2006.
