= Gorji Pol =

Village in Mazandaran province, Iran

Gorji Pol Persian: گرجی پل
- Village
- Location within Iran
- Coordinates: 36°46′38″N 53°03′04″E
- Country: Iran
- Province: Mazandaran
- County: Sari
- District: Rudpey-ye Shomali
- Rural District: Farahabad-e Shomali

Population (2016)
  - Total: 276
- Time zone: UTC+3:30 (IRST)

Gorji Pol (Persian: گرجی پل) (Note: Also romanized as Gorjī Pol) is a village in Farahabad-e Shomali Rural District of Rudpey-ye Shomali District in Sari County, Mazandaran province, Iran.

== Demographics ==
=== Population ===
At the time of the 2006 National Census, the village's population was 322 in 79 households, when it was in Rudpey-ye Shomali Rural District (Note: Renamed Farahabad-e Shomali Rural District) of the Central District. The following census in 2011 counted 273 people in 76 households, by which time the rural district had been separated from the district in the formation of Rudpey District. The 2016 census measured the population of the village as 276 people in 83 households, when the rural district had been separated from the district in the formation of Rudpey-ye Shomali District and renamed Farahabad-e Shomali Rural District.
