= Panbeh Chuleh-ye Bala =

Village in Mazandaran province, Iran

Panbeh Chuleh-ye Bala Persian: پنبه چوله بالا
- Village
- Location within Iran
- Coordinates: 36°43′04″N 53°07′25″E
- Country: Iran
- Province: Mazandaran
- County: Sari
- District: Rudpey-ye Shomali
- Rural District: Farahabad-e Jonubi

Population (2016)
  - Total: 796
- Time zone: UTC+3:30 (IRST)

Panbeh Chuleh-ye Bala (Persian: پنبه چوله بالا) (Note: Also romanized as Panbeh Chūleh Bālā and Panbeh-ye Chūleh Bālā; also known as Panbeh Chūleh and Panbeh Chūleh Pā’īn) is a village in Farahabad-e Jonubi Rural District of Rudpey-ye Shomali District in Sari County, Mazandaran province, Iran.

== Demographics ==
=== Population ===
At the time of the 2006 National Census, the village's population was 725 in 181 households, when it was in Rudpey-ye Shomali Rural District (Note: Renamed Farahabad-e Shomali Rural District) of the Central District. The following census in 2011 counted 800 people in 241 households, by which time the rural district had been separated from the district in the formation of Rudpey District. The 2016 census measured the population of the village as 796 people in 265 households, when the rural district had been separated from the district in the formation of Rudpey-ye Shomali District and renamed Farahabad-e Shomali Rural District. The village was transferred to Farahabad-e Jonubi Rural District created in the new district.
