= Panbeh Zar Koti =

Village in Mazandaran province, Iran

Panbeh Zar Koti Persian: پنبه زار کنی
- Village
- Location within Iran
- Coordinates: 36°41′10″N 53°03′53″E
- Country: Iran
- Province: Mazandaran
- County: Sari
- District: Rudpey
- Rural District: Rudpey-ye Gharbi

Population (2016)
  - Total: 473
- Time zone: UTC+3:30 (IRST)

Panbeh Zar Koti (Persian: پنبه زار کتی) (Note: Also romanized as Panbeh Zār Kotī and Panbehzar Koti; also known as Panbeh Dār Kotī and Panbehdār Kotī) is a village in Rudpey-ye Gharbi Rural District of Rudpey District in Sari County, Mazandaran province, Iran.

== Demographics ==
=== Population ===
At the time of the 2006 National Census, the village's population was 445 in 124 households, when it was in Rudpey-ye Jonubi Rural District (Note: Formerly Rudpey Rural District, renamed Rudpey-ye Sharqi Rural District) of the Central District. The following census in 2011 counted 429 people in 125 households, by which time the rural district had been separated from the district in the formation of Rudpey District. The 2016 census measured the population of the village as 473 people in 159 households, when it had been transferred to Rudpey-ye Gharbi Rural District created in the same district.
