= Gol Neshin =

Village in Mazandaran province, Iran

Gol Neshin Persian: گل نشين
- Village
- Location within Iran
- Coordinates: 36°41′10″N 53°01′31″E
- Country: Iran
- Province: Mazandaran
- County: Sari
- District: Rudpey
- Rural District: Rudpey-ye Gharbi

Population (2016)
  - Total: 552
- Time zone: UTC+3:30 (IRST)

Gol Neshin (Persian: گل نشين) (Note: Also romanized as Gol Neshīn) is a village in, and the capital of, Rudpey-ye Gharbi Rural District in Rudpey District of Sari County, Mazandaran province, Iran.

== Demographics ==
=== Population ===
At the time of the 2006 National Census, the village's population was 544 in 141 households, when it was in Rudpey-ye Jonubi Rural District (Note: Formerly Rudpey Rural District, renamed Rudpey-ye Sharqi Rural District) of the Central District. The following census in 2011 counted 582 people in 168 households, by which time the rural district had been separated from the district in the formation of Rudpey District. The 2016 census measured the population of the village as 552 people in 188 households, when it had been transferred to Rudpey-ye Gharbi Rural District created in the same district.
