= Towqdar =

Village in Mazandaran province, Iran

Towqdar Persian: طوقدار
- Village
- Location within Iran
- Coordinates: 36°46′55″N 53°01′53″E
- Country: Iran
- Province: Mazandaran
- County: Sari
- District: Rudpey-ye Shomali
- Rural District: Farahabad-e Shomali

Population (2016)
  - Total: 697
- Time zone: UTC+3:30 (IRST)

Towqdar (Persian: طوقدار) (Note: Also romanized as Ţowqdār and Tūqdār; also known as Ţowq Vār) is a village in Farahabad-e Shomali Rural District of Rudpey-ye Shomali District in Sari County, Mazandaran province, Iran.

== Demographics ==
=== Population ===
At the time of the 2006 National Census, the village's population was 893 in 235 households, when it was in Rudpey-ye Shomali Rural District (Note: Renamed Farahabad-e Shomali Rural District) of the Central District. The following census in 2011 counted 3,153 people in 269 households, by which time the rural district had been separated from the district in the formation of Rudpey District. The 2016 census measured the population of the village as 697 people in 230 households, when the rural district had been separated from the district in the formation of Rudpey-ye Shomali District and renamed Farahabad-e Shomali Rural District.
