= Abbas Ali Kash =

Village in Mazandaran province, Iran

Abbas Ali Kash Persian: عباسعلی كش
- Village
- Location within Iran
- Coordinates: 36°43′20″N 52°59′48″E
- Country: Iran
- Province: Mazandaran
- County: Sari
- District: Rudpey
- Rural District: Rudpey-ye Gharbi

Population (2016)
  - Total: 821
- Time zone: UTC+3:30 (IRST)

Abbas Ali Kash (Persian: عباسعلی كش) (Note: Also romanized as ‘Abbās ‘Alī Kash, ‘Abbās ‘Alī Kesh, and ‘Abbās ‘Alī Kosh; also known as ‘Abbāsābād) is a village in Rudpey-ye Gharbi Rural District of Rudpey District in Sari County, Mazandaran province, Iran.

== Demographics ==
=== Population ===
At the time of the 2006 National Census, the village's population was 812 in 231 households, when it was in Rudpey-ye Jonubi Rural District (Note: Formerly Rudpey Rural District, renamed Rudpey-ye Sharqi Rural District) of the Central District. The following census in 2011 counted 831 people in 268 households, by which time the rural district had been separated from the district in the formation of Rudpey District. The 2016 census measured the population of the village as 821 people in 276 households, when it had been transferred to Rudpey-ye Gharbi Rural District created in the same district.
