= Sharifabad, Sari =

Village in Mazandaran province, Iran

Sharifabad Persian: شريف آباد
- Village
- Location within Iran
- Coordinates: 36°47′41″N 53°07′01″E
- Country: Iran
- Province: Mazandaran
- County: Sari
- District: Rudpey-ye Shomali
- Rural District: Farahabad-e Shomali

Population (2016)
  - Total: 146
- Time zone: UTC+3:30 (IRST)

Sharifabad (Persian: شريف آباد) (Note: Also romanized as Sharīfābād) is a village in Farahabad-e Shomali Rural District of Rudpey-ye Shomali District in Sari County, Mazandaran province, Iran.

== Demographics ==
=== Population ===
At the time of the 2006 National Census, the village's population was 241 in 60 households, when it was in Rudpey-ye Shomali Rural District (Note: Renamed Farahabad-e Shomali Rural District) of the Central District. The following census in 2011 counted 149 people in 46 households, by which time the rural district had been separated from the district in the formation of Rudpey District. The 2016 census measured the population of the village as 146 people in 52 households, when the rural district had been separated from the district in the formation of Rudpey-ye Shomali District and renamed Farahabad-e Shomali Rural District.
