= Panbeh Chuleh-ye Pain =

Village in Mazandaran province, Iran

Panbeh Chuleh-ye Pain Persian: پنبه چوله پائين
- Village
- Location within Iran
- Coordinates: 36°43′50″N 53°07′43″E
- Country: Iran
- Province: Mazandaran
- County: Sari
- District: Rudpey-ye Shomali
- Rural District: Farahabad-e Jonubi

Population (2016)
  - Total: 973
- Time zone: UTC+3:30 (IRST)

Panbeh Chuleh-ye Pain (Persian: پنبه چوله پائين) (Note: Also romanized as Panbeh Chūleh-ye Pā’īn) is a village in, and the capital of, Farahabad-e Jonubi Rural District in Rudpey-ye Shomali District of Sari County, Mazandaran province, Iran.

== Demographics ==
=== Population ===
At the time of the 2006 National Census, the village's population was 1,161 in 314 households, when it was in Rudpey-ye Shomali Rural District (Note: Renamed Farahabad-e Shomali Rural District) of the Central District. The following census in 2011 counted 1,026 people in 314 households, by which time the rural district had been separated from the district in the formation of Rudpey District. The 2016 census measured the population of the village as 973 people in 337 households, when the rural district had been separated from the district in the formation of Rudpey-ye Shomali District and renamed Farahabad-e Shomali Rural District. The village was transferred to Farahabad-e Jonubi Rural District created in the new district. Panbeh Chuleh-ye Pain and the village of Esfandan (with the same number of people), were the most populous villages in their rural district.
