= Galesh Kola, Sari =

Village in Mazandaran province, Iran

Galesh Kola Persian: گالش كلا
- Village
- Location within Iran
- Coordinates: 36°40′39″N 53°02′39″E
- Country: Iran
- Province: Mazandaran
- County: Sari
- District: Rudpey
- Rural District: Rudpey-ye Gharbi

Population (2016)
  - Total: 455
- Time zone: UTC+3:30 (IRST)

Galesh Kola (Persian: گالش كلا) (Note: Also romanized as Gālesh Kolā) is a village in Rudpey-ye Gharbi Rural District of Rudpey District in Sari County, Mazandaran province, Iran.

== Demographics ==
=== Population ===
At the time of the 2006 National Census, the village's population was 422 in 120 households, when it was in Rudpey-ye Jonubi Rural District (Note: Formerly Rudpey Rural District, renamed Rudpey-ye Sharqi Rural District) of the Central District. The following census in 2011 counted 433 people in 147 households, by which time the rural district had been separated from the district in the formation of Rudpey District. The 2016 census measured the population of the village as 455 people in 170 households, when it had been transferred to Rudpey-ye Gharbi Rural District created in the same district.
