= Owja Mahalleh =

Owja Mahalleh اوجامحله
- Village
- Location within Iran
- Coordinates: 36°36′38″N 53°04′27″E
- Country: Iran
- Province: Mazandaran
- County: Sari
- Bakhsh: Rudpey
- Rural District: Rudpey-ye Sharqi

Population (2016)
  - Total: 398
- Time zone: UTC+3:30 (IRST)

Owja Mahalleh (Persian: اوجامحله, also Romanized as Owjā Maḩalleh) is a village in Rudpey-ye Sharqi Rural District, in the Rudpey District of Sari County, Mazandaran Province, Iran. At the 2016 census, its population was 398, in 139 families. Up from 317 people in 2006.
