= Cheft Sara Kand =

Cheft Sara Kand چفت سراكند
- Village
- Interactive map of Cheft Sara Kand
- Coordinates: 36°42′32″N 53°04′25″E
- Country: Iran
- Province: Mazandaran
- County: Sari
- Bakhsh: Rudpey
- Rural District: Rudpey-ye Sharqi

Population (2016)
  - Total: 228
- Time zone: UTC+3:30 (IRST)

Cheft Sara Kand (Persian: چفت سراكند, also Romanized as Cheft Sarā Kand) is a village in Rudpey-ye Sharqi Rural District, in the Rudpey District of Sari County, Mazandaran Province, Iran. At the 2016 census, its population was 228, in 77 families.
