= Qajar Kheyl =

Village in Mazandaran province, Iran

Qajar Kheyl Persian: قاجارخيل
- Village
- Location within Iran
- Coordinates: 36°45′52″N 53°02′32″E
- Country: Iran
- Province: Mazandaran
- County: Sari
- District: Rudpey-ye Shomali
- Rural District: Farahabad-e Shomali

Population (2016)
  - Total: 1,198
- Time zone: UTC+3:30 (IRST)

Qajar Kheyl (Persian: قاجارخيل) (Note: Also romanized as Qājār Kheyl; also known as Ghajar Kheil) is a village in Farahabad-e Shomali Rural District of Rudpey-ye Shomali District in Sari County, Mazandaran province, Iran.

== Demographics ==
=== Population ===
At the time of the 2006 National Census, the village's population was 1,187 in 310 households, when it was in Rudpey-ye Shomali Rural District (Note: Renamed Farahabad-e Shomali Rural District) of the Central District. The following census in 2011 counted 1,135 people in 339 households, by which time the rural district had been separated from the district in the formation of Rudpey District. The 2016 census measured the population of the village as 1,198 people in 327 households, when the rural district had been separated from the district in the formation of Rudpey-ye Shomali District and renamed Farahabad-e Shomali Rural District.
