= Taj ol Din Mahalleh =

Taj ol Din Mahalleh تاج الدين محله
- Village
- Location within Iran
- Coordinates: 36°42′20″N 52°59′38″E
- Country: Iran
- Province: Mazandaran
- County: Sari
- Bakhsh: Rudpey
- Rural District: Rudpey-ye Gharbi

Population (2006)
  - Total: 404
- Time zone: UTC+3:30 (IRST)

Taj ol Din Mahalleh (Persian: تاج الدين محله, also Romanized as Tāj ol Dīn Maḩalleh; also known as Tāj od Dīn) is a village in Rudpey-ye Gharbi Rural District, in the Rudpey District of Sari County, Mazandaran Province, Iran. At the 2016 census, its population was 376, in 137 families. Down from 404 people in 2006.
