= Deraz Mahalleh, Mazandaran =

Village in Mazandaran province, Iran

Deraz Mahalleh Persian: درازمحله
- Village
- Location within Iran
- Coordinates: 36°36′53″N 53°03′15″E
- Country: Iran
- Province: Mazandaran
- County: Sari
- District: Rudpey
- Rural District: Rudpey-ye Sharqi

Population (2016)
  - Total: 663
- Time zone: UTC+3:30 (IRST)

Deraz Mahalleh (Persian: درازمحله) (Note: Also romanized as Derāz Maḩalleh) is a village in Rudpey-ye Sharqi Rural District (Note: Formerly Rudpey Rural District and Rudpey-ye Jonubi Rural District) of Rudpey District in Sari County, Mazandaran province, Iran.

== Demographics ==
=== Population ===
At the time of the 2006 National Census, the village's population was 586 in 169 households, when it was in Rudpey-ye Jonubi Rural District (Note: Formerly Rudpey Rural District) of the Central District. The following census in 2011 counted 647 people in 201 households, by which time the rural district had been separated from the district in the formation of Rudpey District. The 2016 census measured the population of the village as 663 people in 228 households, when its rural district had been renamed Rudpey-ye Sharqi Rural District.
