= Panbeh Chuleh =

Panbeh Chuleh (Persian: پنبه چوله) may refer to:

- Panbeh Chuleh-ye Bala
- Panbeh Chuleh-ye Pain
