= Rudpey =

Rudpey (Persian: رودپي) may refer to:

- Rudpey-ye Jonubi Rural District
- Rudpey-ye Shomali Rural District
