= Samandak =

Samandak سمندک
- Village
- Location within Iran
- Coordinates: 36°38′43″N 53°02′54″E
- Country: Iran
- Province: Mazandaran
- County: Sari
- Bakhsh: Rudpey
- Rural District: Rudpey-ye Gharbi

Population (2016)
  - Total: 203
- Time zone: UTC+3:30 (IRST)

Samandak (Persian: سمندک) is a village in Rudpey-ye Gharbi Rural District, in the Rudpey District of Sari County, Mazandaran Province, Iran. At the 2016 census, its population was 203, in 64 families.
