= Hajjiabad, Rudpey-ye Jonubi =

Hajjiabad حاجی آباد
- Village
- Location within Iran
- Coordinates: 36°40′14″N 53°02′33″E
- Country: Iran
- Province: Mazandaran
- County: Sari
- Bakhsh: Rudpey
- Rural District: Rudpey-ye Gharbi

Population (2016)
  - Total: 162
- Time zone: UTC+3:30 (IRST)

Hajjiabad (Persian: حاجی آباد, also Romanized as Ḩājjīābād) is a village in Rudpey-ye Gharbi Rural District, in the Rudpey District of Sari County, Mazandaran Province, Iran. At the 2016 census, its population was 162, in 59 families.
