= Damir, Iran =

Damir (Persian: دامير or دمير) in Iran may refer to:

- Damir, Kerman (دمير - Damīr)
- Damir, Mazandaran (دامير - Dāmīr)
