= Khaneh Sar Marz =

Khaneh Sar Marz خانه سرمرز
- Village
- Location within Iran
- Coordinates: 36°42′00″N 53°03′00″E
- Country: Iran
- Province: Mazandaran
- County: Sari
- Bakhsh: Rudpey
- Rural District: Rudpey-ye Gharbi

Population (2016)
  - Total: 193
- Time zone: UTC+3:30 (IRST)

Khaneh Sar Marz (Persian: خانه سرمرز, also Romanized as Khāneh Sar Marz) is a village in Rudpey-ye Gharbi Rural District, in the Rudpey District of Sari County, Mazandaran Province, Iran. At the 2016 census, its population was 193, in 63 families. Up from 143 in 2006.
