= Sonteh =

Sonteh or Santeh or Sanateh (Persian: سنته) may refer to:

- Sonteh, Kerman
- Santeh, Kurdistan
- Sanateh, Mazandaran
