= Sang Sarlengeh =

Sang Sarlengeh سنگ سرلنگه
- Village
- Location within Iran
- Coordinates: 36°43′36″N 52°59′09″E
- Country: Iran
- Province: Mazandaran
- County: Sari
- Bakhsh: Rudpey
- Rural District: Rudpey-ye Gharbi

Population (2016)
  - Total: 79
- Time zone: UTC+3:30 (IRST)

Sang Sarlengeh (Persian: سنگ سرلنگه; also known as Sang Sarlīngeh) is a village in Rudpey-ye Gharbi Rural District, in the Rudpey District of Sari County, Mazandaran Province, Iran. At the 2016 census, its population was 79, in 29 families.
