= Farahabad-e Jonubi Rural District =

Rural district in Mazandaran province, Iran

Farahabad-e Jonubi Rural District Persian: دهستان فرح‌آباد جنوبی
- Rural District
- Location within Iran
- Coordinates: 36°44′N 53°05′E
- Country: Iran
- Province: Mazandaran
- County: Sari
- District: Rudpey-ye Shomali
- Established: 2012
- Capital: Panbeh Chuleh-ye Pain

Population (2016)
  - Total: 5,826
- Time zone: UTC+3:30 (IRST)

Farahabad-e Jonubi Rural District (Persian: دهستان فرح‌آباد جنوبی) is in Rudpey-ye Shomali District of Sari County, Mazandaran province, Iran. Its capital is the village of Panbeh Chuleh-ye Pain.

== History ==
In 2010, Rudpey-ye Jonubi (Note: Formerly Rudpey Rural District, renamed Rudpey-ye Sharqi Rural District) and Rudpey-ye Shomali (Note: Renamed Farahabad-e Shomali Rural District) Rural Districts were separated from the Central District in the formation of Rudpey District. In 2012, Rudpey-ye Shomali Rural District was separated from the district in the formation of Rudpey-ye Shomali District and renamed Farahabad-e Shomali Rural District. Farahabad-e Jonubi Rural District was created in the new district.

== Demographics ==
=== Population ===
The 2016 National Census measured the population of the rural district as 5,826 in 1,846 households. The most populous of its 13 villages was Esfandan, with 973 people, the same reported for the rural district's capital.

=== Other villages in the rural district ===
- Abmal
- Dazmir Kandeh
- Emamzadeh Khalifeh
- Eslamdeh
- Jorreh Sar
- Kalmahr
- Kord Kheyl
- Muzi Bagh
- Nasirabad
- Panbeh Chuleh-ye Bala
