= Arab Kheyl, Sari =

Arab Kheyl عرب‌خيل
- village
- Location within Iran
- Coordinates: 36°41′20″N 53°02′51″E
- Country: Iran
- Province: Mazandaran
- County: Sari
- Bakhsh: Rudpey
- Rural District: Rudpey-ye Gharbi

Population (2016)
  - Total: 228
- Time zone: UTC+3:30 (IRST)

Arab Kheyl (Persian: عرب‌خيل, also Romanized as ‘Arab Khil; also known as ‘Arab Mahalleh) is a village in Rudpey-ye Gharbi Rural District, in the Rudpey District of Sari County, Mazandaran Province, Iran. At the 2016 census, its population was 228, in 73 families.
