= Rudpey-ye Gharbi Rural District =

Rural district in Mazandaran province, Iran

Rudpey-ye Gharbi Rural District Persian: دهستان رودپي غربي
- Rural District
- Location within Iran
- Coordinates: 36°41′N 53°02′E
- Country: Iran
- Province: Mazandaran
- County: Sari
- District: Rudpey
- Established: 2012
- Capital: Gol Neshin

Population (2016)
  - Total: 9,762
- Time zone: UTC+3:30 (IRST)

Rudpey-ye Gharbi Rural District (Persian: دهستان رودپي غربي) is in Rudpey District of Sari County, Mazandaran province, Iran. Its capital is the village of Gol Neshin.

== History ==
In 2010, Rudpey-ye Jonubi (Note: Formerly Rudpey Rural District; renamed Rudpey-ye Sharqi Rural District) and Rudpey-ye Shomali (Note: Renamed Farahabad-e Shomali Rural District) Rural Districts were separated from the Central District in the formation of Rudpey District. Rudpey-ye Gharbi Rural District was created in the district in 2012.

== Demographics ==
=== Population ===
The 2016 National Census measured the population of the rural district as 9,762 in 3,384 households. The most populous of its 23 settlements was the village of Seyyed Mahalleh, with 1,544 people.

=== Other villages in the rural district ===
- Abbas Ali Kash
- Allah Marz
- Arab Kheyl
- Arab Mahalleh
- Chamazak
- Damir
- Dinak
- Galesh Kola
- Hajjiabad
- Khaneh Sar Marz
- Kharmian
- Panbeh Zar Koti
- Samandak
- Sanateh
- Sang Sarlengeh
- Soleyman Mahalleh
- Taj ol Din Mahalleh
- Talarak
