= Dinak =

Dinak (Persian: دينك) may refer to:

- Dinak, Mazandaran
- Dinak, Qazvin
