= Allah Marz, Sari =

Allah Marz لله مرز
- Village
- Location within Iran
- Coordinates: 36°42′00″N 53°03′07″E
- Country: Iran
- Province: Mazandaran
- County: Sari
- Bakhsh: Rudpey
- Rural District: Rudpey-ye Gharbi

Population (2006)
  - Total: 436
- Time zone: UTC+3:30 (IRST)

Allah Marz (Persian: لله مرز, also Romanized as Laleh Marz) is a village in Rudpey-ye Gharbi Rural District, in the Rudpey District of Sari County, Mazandaran Province, Iran. According to the 2016 census, its population was 385, with 132 families. Down from 436 in 2006.
