= Mahforuz Mahalleh =

Mahforuz Mahalleh (Persian: ماهفروزمحله) may refer to:

- Mahforuz Mahalleh-ye Olya
- Mahforuz Mahalleh-ye Sofla
