= Chamazak =

Coordinates: 36°39′13″N 53°02′37″E

Chamazak چمازک
- Village
- Interactive map of Chamazak
- Country: Iran
- Province: Mazandaran
- County: Sari
- Bakhsh: Rudpey
- Rural District: Rudpey-ye Gharbi

Population (2016)
  - Total: 185
- Time zone: UTC+3:30 (IRST)

Chamazak (Persian: چمازک, also Romanized as Chamāzak) is a village in Rudpey-ye Gharbi Rural District, in the Rudpey District of Sari County, Mazandaran Province, Iran. At the 2016 census, its population was 185, in 54 families.
