= Talarak =

Talarak تالارک
- Village
- Location within Iran
- Coordinates: 36°40′14″N 52°59′28″E
- Country: Iran
- Province: Mazandaran
- County: Sari
- Bakhsh: Rudpey
- Rural District: Rudpey-ye Gharbi

Population (2006)
  - Total: 166
- Time zone: UTC+3:30 (IRST)

Talarak (Persian: تالارک, also Romanized as Tālārak) is a village in Rudpey-ye Gharbi Rural District, in the Rudpey District of Sari County, Mazandaran Province, Iran. At the 2016 census, its population was 144, in 54 families. Down from 166 in 2006.
