= Firuz Kandeh =

Firuz Kandeh (Persian: فيروزكنده) may refer to:

- Firuz Kandeh-ye Olya
- Firuz Kandeh-ye Sofla
