= Arab Mahalleh =

Arab Mahalleh عرب محله
- Village
- Location within Iran
- Coordinates: 36°42′00″N 53°03′00″E
- Country: Iran
- Province: Mazandaran
- County: Sari
- Bakhsh: Rudpey
- Rural District: Rudpey-ye Gharbi

Population (2016)
  - Total: 234
- Time zone: UTC+3:30 (IRST)

Arab Mahalleh (Persian: عرب محله, also Romanized as ‘Arab Maḩalleh) is a village in Rudpey-ye Gharbi Rural District, in the Rudpey District of Sari County, Mazandaran Province, Iran. At the 2016 census, its population was 234, in 89 families. Up from 220 in 2006.
