= Marzrud =

Marzrud or Marz Rood or Marz Rud (Persian: مرزرود) may refer to:

- Marzrud, East Azerbaijan
- Marzrud, Mazandaran
