= Soleyman Mahalleh, Sari =

Village in Mazandaran, Iran

Soleyman Mahalleh سليمان محله
- Village
- Location within Iran
- Coordinates: 36°42′10″N 53°00′25″E
- Country: Iran
- Province: Mazandaran
- County: Sari
- Bakhsh: Rudpey
- Rural District: Rudpey-ye Gharbi

Population (2006)
  - Total: 235
- Time zone: UTC+3:30 (IRST)

Soleyman Mahalleh (Persian: سليمان محله, also romanized as Soleymān Maḩalleh) is a village in Rudpey-ye Gharbi Rural District, in the Rudpey District of Sari County, Mazandaran Province, Iran. At the 2016 census its population was 193, in 74 families. Down from 235 people in 2006.
