= Sanateh, Mazandaran =

Sanateh سنته
- Village
- Location within Iran
- Coordinates: 36°39′55″N 53°02′13″E
- Country: Iran
- Province: Mazandaran
- County: Sari
- Bakhsh: Rudpey
- Rural District: Rudpey-ye Gharbi

Population (2016)
  - Total: 391
- Time zone: UTC+3:30 (IRST)

Sanateh (Persian: سنته, also Romanized as Santeh) is a village in Rudpey-ye Gharbi Rural District, in the Rudpey District of Sari County, Mazandaran Province, Iran. At the 2016 census, its population was 391, in 141 families. Up from 358 in 2006.
