= Firuz Kandeh-ye Olya =

Village in Mazandaran province, Iran

Firuz Kandeh-ye Olya Persian: فيروزكنده عليا
- Village
- Location within Iran
- Coordinates: 36°38′09″N 53°04′21″E
- Country: Iran
- Province: Mazandaran
- County: Sari
- District: Rudpey
- Rural District: Rudpey-ye Sharqi

Population (2016)
  - Total: 1,284
- Time zone: UTC+3:30 (IRST)

Firuz Kandeh-ye Olya (Persian: فيروزكنده عليا) (Note: Also romanized as Fīrūz Kandeh-ye ‘Olyā; also known as Bālā Maḩalleh-ye Fīrūz Kandeh, Fīrūz Kand, Fīrūz Kandeh, and Fīrūz Kandeh-ye Bālā) is a village in, and the capital of, Rudpey-ye Sharqi Rural District (Note: Formerly Rudpey Rural District and Rudpey-ye Jonubi Rural District) in Rudpey District of Sari County, Mazandaran province, Iran. The previous capital of the rural district was the village of Akand, now a city.

== Demographics ==
=== Population ===
At the time of the 2006 National Census, the village's population was 1,068 in 271 households, when it was in Rudpey-ye Jonubi Rural District (Note: Formerly Rudpey Rural District) of the Central District. The following census in 2011 counted 1,228 people in 351 households, by which time the rural district had been separated from the district in the formation of Rudpey District. The 2016 census measured the population of the village as 1,284 people in 412 households, when its rural district had been renamed Rudpey-ye Sharqi Rural District.
