= Firuz Kandeh-ye Sofla =

Village in Mazandaran province, Iran

Firuz Kandeh-ye Sofla Persian: فيروزكنده سفلی
- Village
- Location within Iran
- Coordinates: 36°38′46″N 53°04′38″E
- Country: Iran
- Province: Mazandaran
- County: Sari
- District: Rudpey
- Rural District: Rudpey-ye Sharqi

Population (2016)
  - Total: 1,251
- Time zone: UTC+3:30 (IRST)

Firuz Kandeh-ye Sofla (Persian: فيروزكنده سفلی) (Note: Also romanized as Fīrūz Kandeh-ye Soflá; also known as Fīrūz Kandeh-ye Pā’īn and Pā’īn Maḩalleh-ye Fīrūz Kandeh) is a village in Rudpey-ye Sharqi Rural District (Note: Formerly Rudpey Rural District and Rudpey-ye Jonubi Rural District) of Rudpey District in Sari County, Mazandaran province, Iran.

== Demographics ==
=== Population ===
At the time of the 2006 National Census, the village's population was 1,150 in 297 households, when it was in Rudpey-ye Jonubi Rural District (Note: Formerly Rudpey Rural District) of the Central District. The following census in 2011 counted 1,111 people in 356 households, by which time the rural district had been separated from the district in the formation of Rudpey District. The 2016 census measured the population of the village as 1,251 people in 377 households, when its rural district had been renamed Rudpey-ye Sharqi Rural District.
