= Mahforuz Mahalleh-ye Olya =

Village in Mazandaran province, Iran

Mahforuz Mahalleh-ye Olya Persian: ماهفروزمحله عليا
- Village
- Location within Iran
- Coordinates: 36°39′32″N 53°05′31″E
- Country: Iran
- Province: Mazandaran
- County: Sari
- District: Rudpey
- Rural District: Rudpey-ye Sharqi

Population (2016)
  - Total: 805
- Time zone: UTC+3:30 (IRST)

Mahforuz Mahalleh-ye Olya (Persian: ماهفروزمحله عليا) (Note: Also romanized as Māhforūz Maḩalleh-ye ‘Olyā; also known as Māhforūz Maḩalleh, Māhforūz Maḩalleh-ye Bālā, and Māhforūz Maḩalleh-ye Pā’īn) is a village in Rudpey-ye Sharqi Rural District (Note: Formerly Rudpey Rural District and Rudpey-ye Jonubi Rural District) of Rudpey District in Sari County, Mazandaran province, Iran.

== Demographics ==
=== Population ===
At the time of the 2006 National Census, the village's population was 598 in 156 households, when it was in Rudpey-ye Jonubi Rural District (Note: Formerly Rudpey Rural District) of the Central District. The following census in 2011 counted 1,214 people in 199 households, by which time the rural district had been separated from the district in the formation of Rudpey District. The 2016 census measured the population of the village as 805 people in 223 households, when its rural district had been renamed Rudpey-ye Sharqi Rural District.
