= Farahabad, Rudpey-ye Shomali =

City in Mazandaran province, Iran

Farahabad Persian: فرح‌آباد
- City
- Location within Iran
- Coordinates: 36°47′19″N 53°06′36″E
- Country: Iran
- Province: Mazandaran
- County: Sari
- District: Rudpey-ye Shomali
- Established as a city: 2018

Population (2016)
  - Total: 2,217
- Time zone: UTC+3:30 (IRST)

Farahabad (Persian: فرح‌آباد) is a city in, and the capital of, Rudpey-ye Shomali District in Sari County, Mazandaran province, Iran. It also serves as the administrative center for Farahabad-e Shomali Rural District. (Note: Formerly Rudpey-e Shomali Rural District)

== Demographics ==
=== Population ===
At the time of the 2006 National Census, Farahabad's population was 2,027 in 570 households, when it was a village in Rudpey-ye Shomali Rural District (Note: Renamed Farahabad-e Shomali Rural District) of the Central District. The following census in 2011 counted 2,027 people in 661 households, by which time the rural district had been separated from the district in the formation of Rudpey District. The 2016 census measured the population as 2,217 people in 762 households, when the rural district had been separated from the district in the formation of Rudpey-ye Shomali District and renamed Farahabad-e Shomali Rural District. The village was the most populous in its rural district.

Farahabad was converted to a city in 2018.
