= Mahforuz Mahalleh-ye Sofla =

Village in Mazandaran province, Iran

Mahforuz Mahalleh-ye Sofla Persian: ماهفروزمحله سفلی
- Village
- Location within Iran
- Coordinates: 36°40′04″N 53°05′16″E
- Country: Iran
- Province: Mazandaran
- County: Sari
- District: Rudpey
- Rural District: Rudpey-ye Sharqi

Population (2016)
  - Total: 1,116
- Time zone: UTC+3:30 (IRST)

Mahforuz Mahalleh-ye Sofla (Persian: ماهفروزمحله سفلی) (Note: Also romanized as Māhforūz Maḩalleh-ye Soflá) is a village in Rudpey-ye Sharqi Rural District (Note: Formerly Rudpey Rural District and Rudpey-ye Jonubi Rural District) of Rudpey District in Sari County, Mazandaran province, Iran.

== Demographics ==
=== Population ===
At the time of the 2006 National Census, the village's population was 939 in 242 households, when it was in Rudpey-ye Jonubi Rural District (Note: Formerly Rudpey Rural District) of the Central District. The following census in 2011 counted 926 people in 262 households, by which time the rural district had been separated from the district in the formation of Rudpey District. The 2016 census measured the population of the village as 1,116 people in 306 households, when its rural district had been renamed Rudpey-ye Sharqi Rural District.
