= Soleyman Mahalleh =

Soleyman Mahalleh (Persian: سليمان محله) may refer to:

- Soleyman Mahalleh, Sari
- Soleyman Mahalleh, Tonekabon
