= Marzrud, Mazandaran =

Village in Mazandaran province, Iran

Marzrud Persian: مرزرود
- Village
- Location within Iran
- Coordinates: 36°41′30″N 53°05′42″E
- Country: Iran
- Province: Mazandaran
- County: Sari
- District: Rudpey
- Rural District: Rudpey-ye Sharqi

Population (2016)
  - Total: 712
- Time zone: UTC+3:30 (IRST)

Marzrud (Persian: مرزرود) (Note: Also romanized as Marzrūd; also known as Marzūd and Mazrūd) is a village in Rudpey-ye Sharqi Rural District (Note: Formerly Rudpey Rural District and Rudpey-ye Jonubi Rural District) of Rudpey District in Sari County, Mazandaran province, Iran.

== Demographics ==
=== Population ===
At the time of the 2006 National Census, the village's population was 678 in 175 households, when it was in Rudpey-ye Jonubi Rural District (Note: Formerly Rudpey Rural District) of the Central District. The following census in 2011 counted 753 people in 233 households, by which time the rural district had been separated from the district in the formation of Rudpey District. The 2016 census measured the population of the village as 712 people in 248 households, when its rural district had been renamed Rudpey-ye Sharqi Rural District.
