= Akand =

City in Mazandaran province, Iran

Akand Persian: آکند
- City
- Location within Iran
- Coordinates: 36°41′45″N 53°04′45″E
- Country: Iran
- Province: Mazandaran
- County: Sari
- District: Rudpey
- Established as a city: 2020

Population (2016)
  - Total: 1,416
- Time zone: UTC+3:30 (IRST)

Akand (Persian: آکند) (Note: Also romanized as Ākand; also known as Akant) is a city in, and the capital of, Rudpey District in Sari County, Mazandaran province, Iran. As a village, it was the capital of Rudpey-ye Sharqi Rural District (Note: Formerly Rudpey Rural District and Rudpey-ye Jonubi Rural District) until its capital was transferred to the village of Firuz Kandeh-ye Olya.

== Demographics ==
=== Population ===
At the time of the 2006 National Census, Akand's population was 1,407 in 378 households, when it was a village in Rudpey-ye Jonubi Rural District (Note: Formerly Rudpey Rural District) of the Central District. The following census in 2011 counted 1,354 people in 443 households, by which time the rural district had been separated from the district in the formation of Rudpey District. The 2016 census measured the population of the village as 1,416 people in 485 households, when the rural district had been renamed Rudpey-ye Sharqi Rural District. The village was the most populous in its rural district.

Akand was converted to a city in 2020.
