= Dinak, Qazvin =

Dinak دينك
- Village
- Location within Iran
- Coordinates: 36°31′54″N 49°51′41″E
- Country: Iran
- Province: Qazvin
- County: Qazvin
- Bakhsh: Kuhin
- Rural District: Ilat-e Qaqazan-e Sharqi

Population (2006)
  - Total: 39
- Time zone: UTC+3:30 (IRST)
  - Summer (DST): UTC+4:30 (IRDT)

Dinak (Persian: دينك, also Romanized as Dīnak; also known as Dīngeh and Denīnak) is a village in Ilat-e Qaqazan-e Sharqi Rural District, Kuhin District, Qazvin County, Qazvin Province, Iran. At the 2006 census, its population was 39, in 11 families.
