= Damir, Kerman =

Damir دمير
- Village
- Location within Iran
- Coordinates: 27°57′09″N 58°43′13″E
- Country: Iran
- Province: Kerman
- County: Rudbar-e Jonubi
- Bakhsh: Jazmurian
- Rural District: Jazmurian

Population (2006)
  - Total: 25
- Time zone: UTC+3:30 (IRST)
  - Summer (DST): UTC+4:30 (IRDT)

Damir (Persian: دمير, also Romanized as Damīr; also known as Deh Mīr) is a village in Jazmurian Rural District, Jazmurian District, Rudbar-e Jonubi County, Kerman Province, Iran. At the 2006 census, its population was 25, in 6 families.
