= Farahabad-e Shomali Rural District =

Rural district in Mazandaran province, Iran

Farahabad-e Shomali Rural District Persian: دهستان فرح‌آباد شمالی
- Rural District
- Location within Iran
- Coordinates: 36°47′N 53°05′E
- Country: Iran
- Province: Mazandaran
- County: Sari
- District: Rudpey-ye Shomali
- Established: 1997
- Capital: Farahabad

Population (2016)
  - Total: 9,670
- Time zone: UTC+3:30 (IRST)

Farahabad-e Shomali Rural District (Persian: دهستان فرح‌آباد شمالی) (Note: Formerly Rudpey-ye Shomali Rural District (دهستان رودپی شمالی)) is in Rudpey-ye Shomali District of Sari County, Mazandaran province, Iran. It is administered from the city of Farahabad.

== Demographics ==
=== Population ===
At the time of the 2006 National Census, the rural district's population (as Rudpey-ye Shomali Rural District of the Central District) was 13,943 in 3,692 households. There were 15,457 inhabitants in 4,070 households at the following census of 2011, by which time the rural district had been separated from the district in the formation of Rudpey District. The 2016 census measured the population of the rural district as 9,670 in 2,586 households, when it had been separated from the district in the formation of Rudpey-ye Shomali District and renamed Farahabad-e Shomali Rural District. The most populous of its 12 villages was Farahabad (now a city), with 2,217 people.

=== Other villages in the rural district ===
- Gorji Pol
- Hamidabad
- Nabiabad
- Qajar Kheyl
- Sharifabad
- Shirin Bul
- Suteh
- Taherabad
- Towqdar
- Valiabad
