= Rudpey-ye Sharqi Rural District =

Rural district in Mazandaran province, Iran

Rudpey-ye Sharqi Rural District Persian: دهستان رودپي شرقی
- Rural District
- Location within Iran
- Coordinates: 36°39′N 53°06′E
- Country: Iran
- Province: Mazandaran
- County: Sari
- District: Rudpey
- Established: 1987
- Capital: Firuz Kandeh-ye Olya

Population (2016)
  - Total: 12,364
- Time zone: UTC+3:30 (IRST)

Rudpey-ye Sharqi Rural District (Persian: دهستان رودپي شرقی) (Note: Formerly Rudpey Rural District (دهستان رودپي) and Rudpey-ye Jonubi Rural District (دهستان رودپي جنوبي)) is in Rudpey District of Sari County, Mazandaran province, Iran. Its capital is the village of Firuz Kandeh-ye Olya. The previous capital of the rural district was the village of Akand, now a city.

== Demographics ==
=== Population ===
At the time of the 2006 National Census, the rural district's population (as Rudpey-ye Jonubi Rural District of the Central District) was 20,548 in 5,480 households. There were 21,830 inhabitants in 6,488 households at the following census of 2011, by which time the rural district had been separated from the district in the formation of Rudpey District. The 2016 census measured the population of the rural district as 12,364 in 3,957 households, when it had been renamed Rudpey-ye Sharqi Rural District. The most populous of its 21 villages was Akand (now a city), with 1,416 people.

=== Other villages in the rural district ===
- Deraz Mahalleh
- Firuz Kandeh-ye Sofla
- Mahforuz Mahalleh-ye Olya
- Mahforuz Mahalleh-ye Sofla
- Marzrud
- Safarabad
