= Rudpey-ye Shomali District =

District in Mazandaran province, Iran

Rudpey-ye Shomali District Persian: بخش رودپی شمالی
- District
- Location within Iran
- Coordinates: 36°46′N 53°05′E
- Country: Iran
- Province: Mazandaran
- County: Sari
- Established: 2012
- Capital: Farahabad

Population (2016)
  - Total: 15,496
- Time zone: UTC+3:30 (IRST)

Rudpey-ye Shomali District (Persian: بخش رودپی شمالی) is in Sari County, Mazandaran province, Iran. Its capital is the city of Farahabad.

== History ==
After the 2006 National Census, Rudpey-ye Jonubi (Note: Formerly Rudpey Rural District, renamed Rudpey-ye Sharqi Rural District) and Rudpey-ye Shomali (Note: Renamed Farahabad-e Shomali Rural District) Rural Districts were separated from the Central District in the formation of Rudpey District. In 2012, Rudpey-ye Shomali Rural District was separated from the district in the formation of Rudpey-ye Shomali District and renamed Farahabad-e Shomali Rural District. The village of Farahabad was converted to a city in 2018.

== Demographics ==
=== Population ===
The 2016 census measured the population of the district as 15,496 inhabitants in 4,432 households.

=== Administrative divisions ===
Rudpey-ye Shomali District Population
Administrative Divisions	2016
Farahabad-e Jonubi RD	5,826
Farahabad-e Shomali RD (Note: Formerly Rudpey-ye Shomali Rural District)	9,670
Farahabad (city) (Note: Became a city after the 2016 census)	
Total	15,496
RD = Rural District
