= Sari County =

County in Mazandaran province, Iran

Sari County Persian: شهرستان ساری
- County
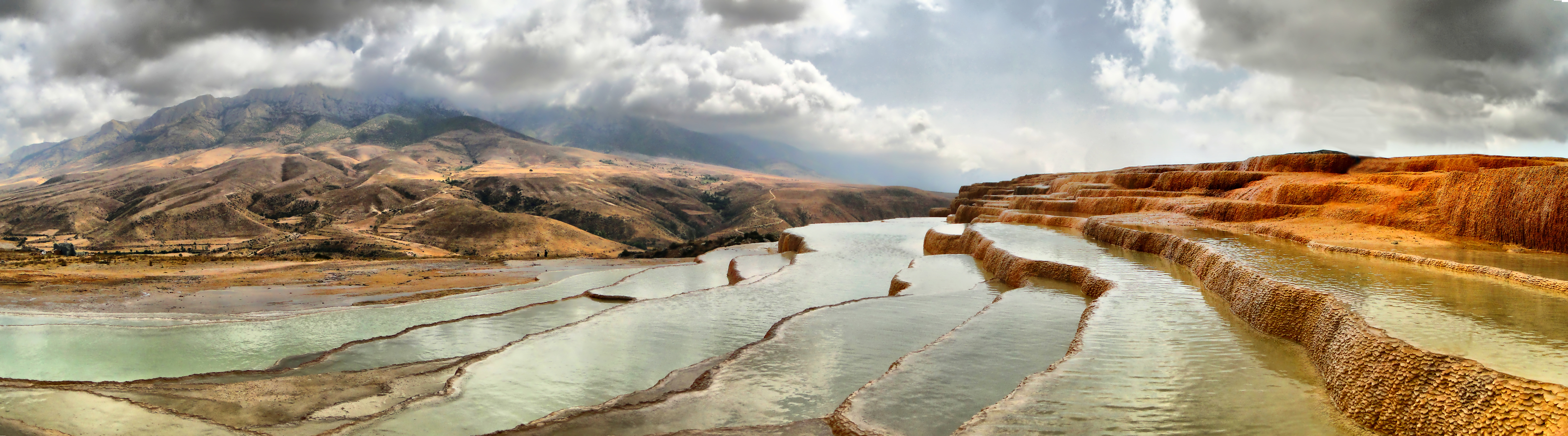
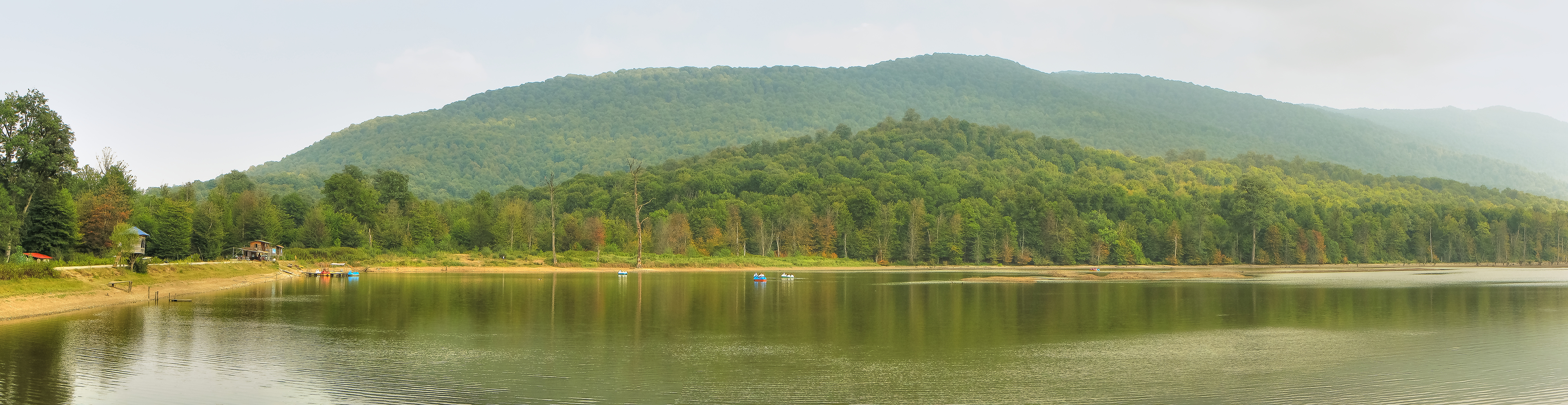
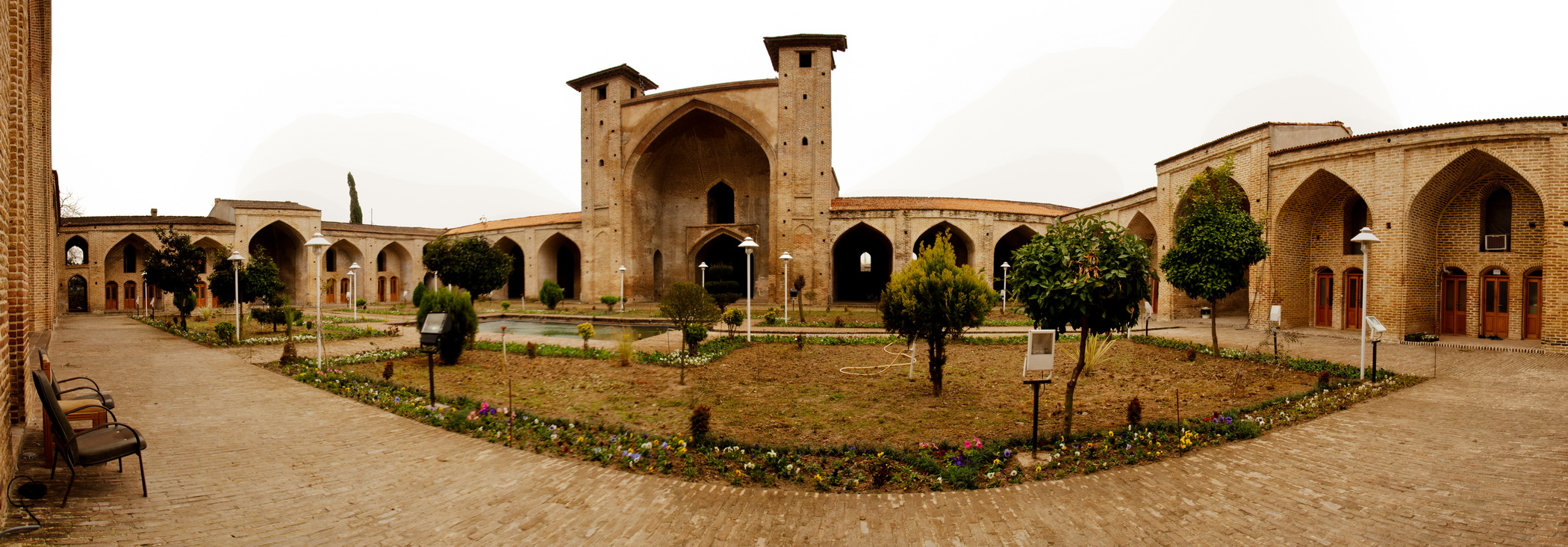
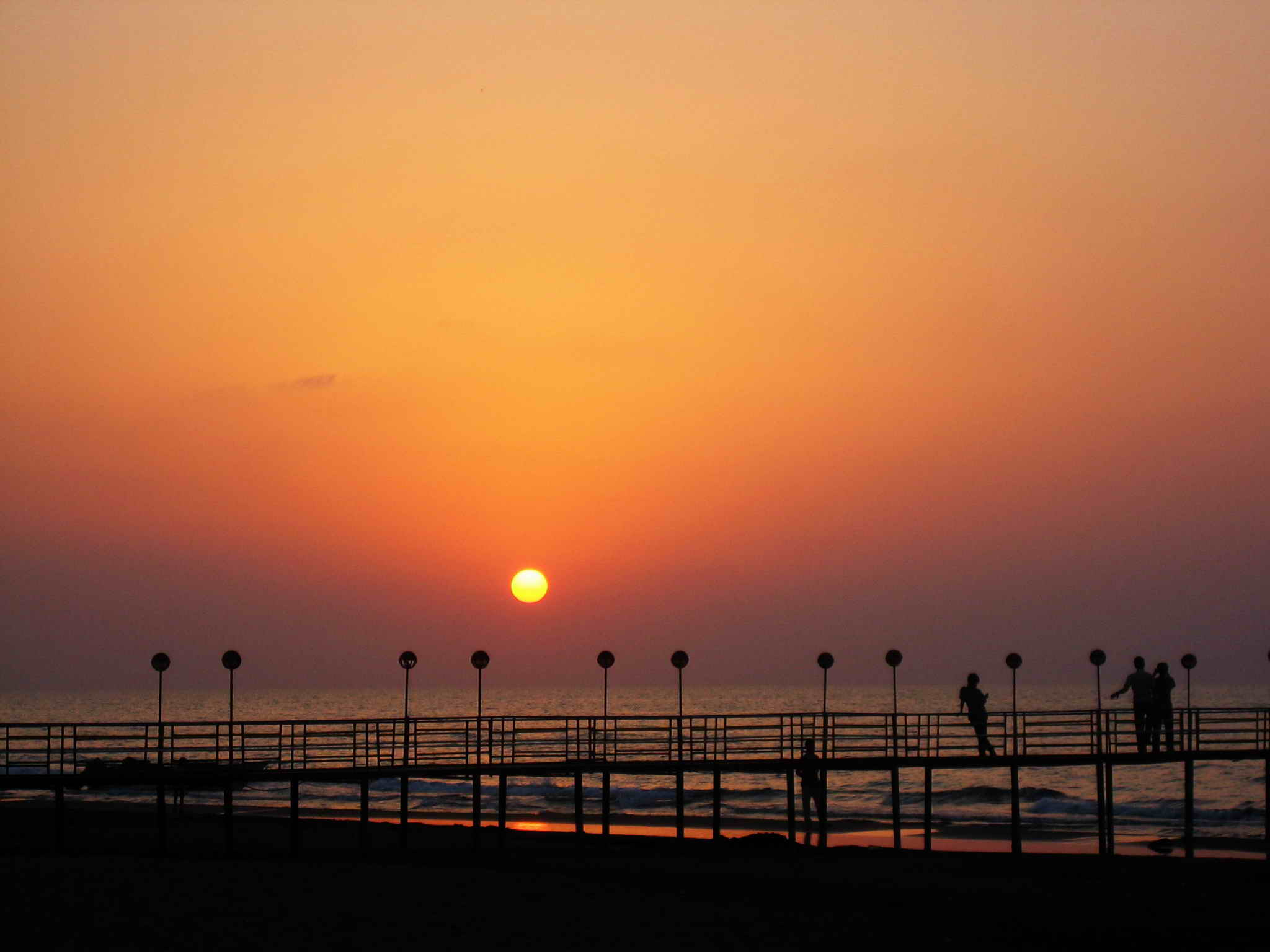
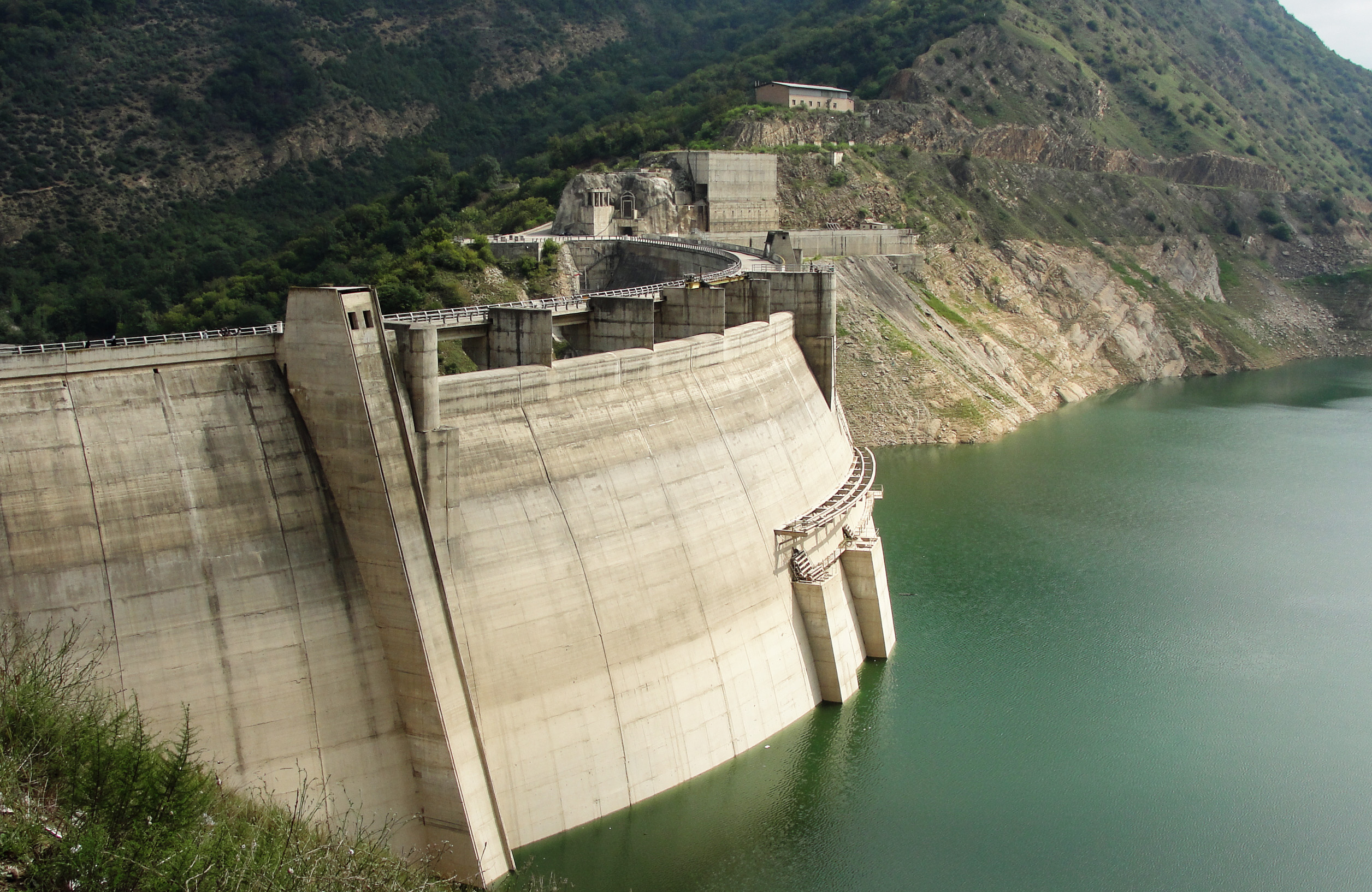
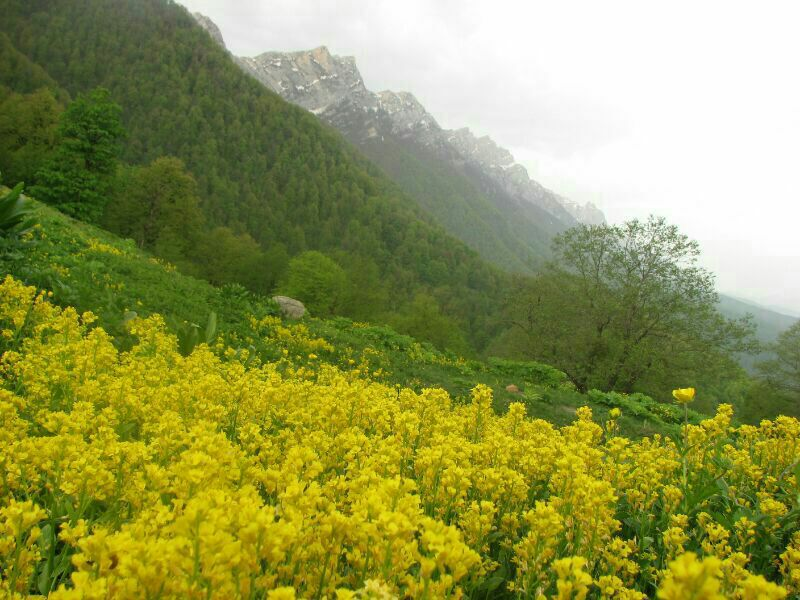
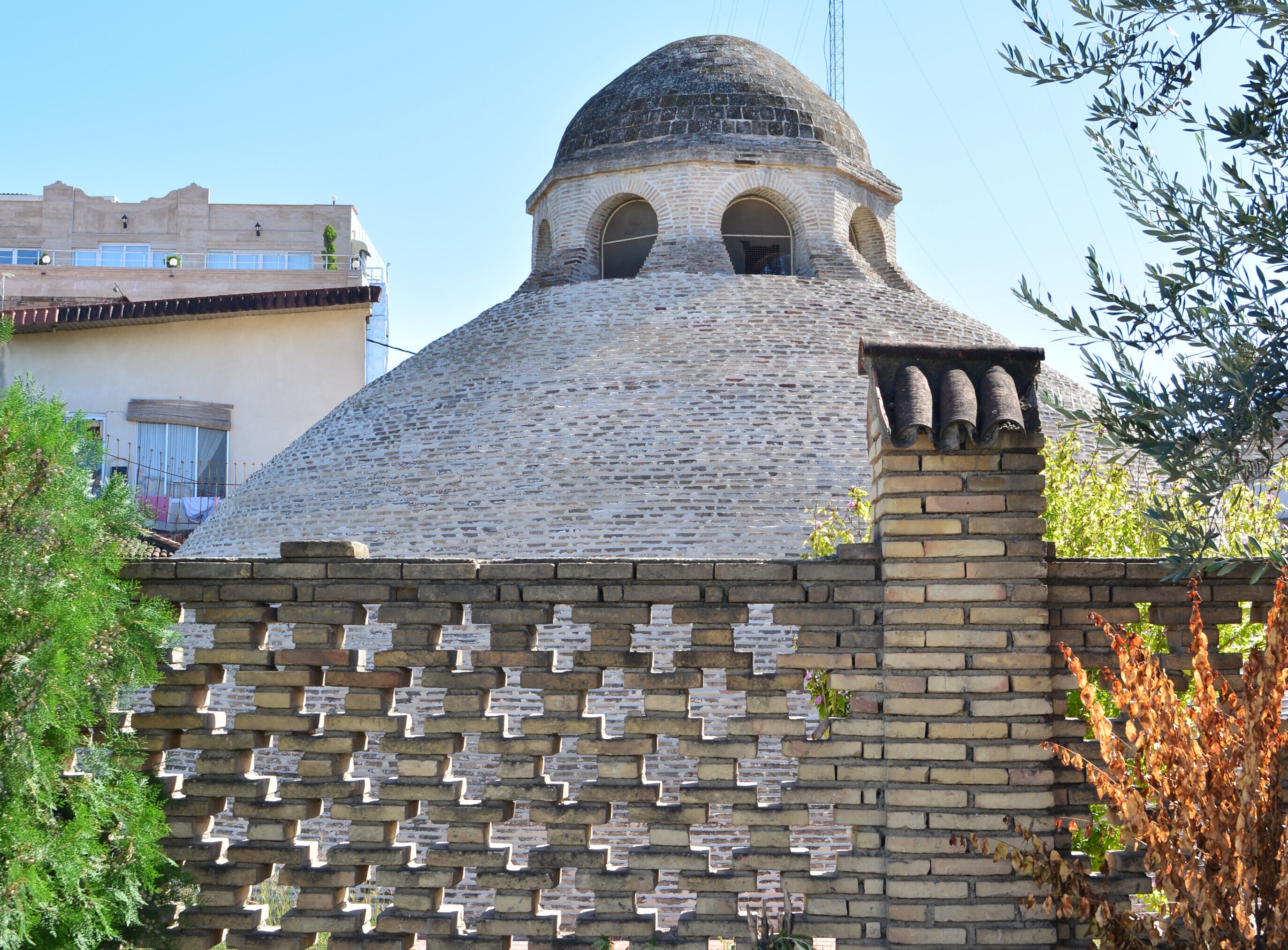

- Location of Sari County in Mazandaran province (center right, purple)

- Location of Mazandaran province in Iran
- Coordinates: 36°20′N 53°16′E
- Country: Iran
- Province: Mazandaran
- Capital: Sari
- Districts: Central, Chahardangeh, Dodangeh, Kolijan Rostaq, Rudpey, Rudpey-ye Shomali

Area
  - Total: 3,685.30 km^{2} (1,422.90 sq mi)

Population (2025)
  - Total: 920,000
  - Density: 250/km^{2} (650/sq mi)
- Time zone: UTC+3:30 (IRST)

Sari County (Persian: شهرستان ساری) is in Mazandaran province, Iran. Its capital is the city of Sari.

== History ==
In 2010, Miandorud District was separated from the county in the establishment of Miandorud County. In the same year, Rudpey-ye Jonubi and Rudpey-ye Shomali Rural Districts were separated from the Central District in the formation of Rudpey District.

The village of Pain Hular was converted to a city in 2011.

In 2012, Rudpey-ye Gharbi Rural District was created in Rudpey District, and Rudpey-ye Shomali Rural District was separated from it in the formation of Rudpey-ye Shomali District, which included the new Farahabad-e Jonubi Rural District.

The village of Farahabad was converted to a city in 2018, and the village of Akand became a city in 2020.

== Demographics ==
=== Population ===
At the time of the 2006 National Census, the county's population was 490,830 in 132,919 households. The following census in 2011 counted 478,370 people in 145,339 households. The 2016 census measured the population of the county as 504,298 in 165,467 households.

=== Administrative divisions ===
Sari County's population history and administrative structure over three consecutive censuses are shown in the following table.

Sari County Population
Administrative Divisions	2006	2011	2016
Central District	395,716	405,850	429,620
Esfivard-e Shurab RD	25,400	26,172	27,291
Kolijan Rostaq-e Sofla RD	16,953	21,579	21,813
Mazkureh RD	25,883	27,302	33,310
Miandorud-e Kuchak RD	33,905	34,380	37,386
Rudpey-ye Jonubi RD (Note: Formerly Rudpey Rural District and renamed Rudpey-ye Sharqi Rural District)	20,548		
Rudpey-ye Shomali RD	13,943		
Sari (city)	259,084	296,417	309,820
Chahardangeh District	19,969	15,796	17,376
Chahardangeh RD	5,884	4,081	4,864
Garmab RD	6,610	5,533	5,804
Poshtkuh RD	3,885	3,345	3,324
Kiasar (city)	3,590	2,837	3,384
Dodangeh District	8,140	7,705	7,653
Banaft RD	3,209	2,979	2,759
Farim RD	4,751	4,454	4,525
Farim (city) (Note: Formerly the village of Mohammadabad)	180	272	369
Kolijan Rostaq District	13,143	11,732	12,024
Kolijan Rostaq-e Olya RD	9,543	9,183	8,461
Tangeh Soleyman RD	3,600	2,549	2,607
Pain Hular (city)			956
Miandorud District (Note: Transferred to Miandorud County)	53,862		
Kuhdasht RD (Note: Renamed Kuhdasht-e Sharqi Rural District)	20,601		
Miandorud-e Bozorg RD	24,444		
Surak (city)	8,817		
Rudpey District		37,287	22,126
Rudpey-ye Gharbi RD			9,762
Rudpey-ye Sharqi RD (Note: Formerly Rudpey Rural District and Rudpey-ye Jonubi Rural District)		21,830	12,364
Rudpey-ye Shomali RD (Note: Renamed Farahabad-e Shomali Rural District)		15,457	
Akand (city) (Note: Became a city after the 2016 census)			
Rudpey-ye Shomali District			15,496
Farahabad-e Jonubi RD			5,826
Farahabad-e Shomali RD (Note: Formerly Rudpey-ye Shomali Rural District)			9,670
Farahabad (city) (Note: Became a city after the 2016 census)			
Total	490,830	478,370	504,298
RD = Rural District

== See also ==
- Lake Churat

Media related to Sari County at Wikimedia Commons
