= Rudpey District =

District in Mazandaran province, Iran

Rudpey District Persian: بخش رودپی
- District
- Location within Iran
- Coordinates: 36°40′N 53°05′E
- Country: Iran
- Province: Mazandaran
- County: Sari
- Established: 2010
- Capital: Akand

Population (2016)
  - Total: 22,126
- Time zone: UTC+3:30 (IRST)

Rudpey District (Persian: بخش رودپی) is in Sari County, Mazandaran province, Iran. Its capital is the city of Akand.

== History ==
In 2010, Rudpey-ye Jonubi (Note: Formerly Rudpey Rural District and Rudpey-ye Jonubi Rural District) and Rudpey-ye Shomali (Note: Transferred to Rudpey-ye Shomali District and renamed Farahabad-e Jonubi Rural District) Rural Districts were separated from the Central District in the formation of Rudpey District.

In 2012, Rudpey-ye Gharbi Rural District was created in the district, and Rudpey-ye Shomali Rural District was separated from it in the formation of Rudpey-ye Shomali District.

The village of Akand was converted to a city in 2020.

== Demographics ==
=== Population ===
At the time of the 2011 National Census, the district's population was 37,287 people in 10,558 households. The 2016 census measured the population of the district as 22,126 inhabitants in 7,341 households.

=== Administrative divisions ===
Rudpey District Population
Administrative Divisions	2011	2016
Rudpey-ye Gharbi RD		9,762
Rudpey-ye Sharqi RD	21,830	12,364
Rudpey-ye Shomali RD	15,457	
Akand (city) (Note: Became a city after the 2016 census)		
Total	37,287	22,126
RD = Rural District
