= Siah Chenar =

Village in Mazandaran province, Iran

Siah Chenar Persian: سياه چنار
- Village
- Location within Iran
- Coordinates: 36°41′50″N 53°13′17″E
- Country: Iran
- Province: Mazandaran
- County: Miandorud
- District: Goharbaran
- Rural District: Goharbaran-e Jonubi

Population (2016)
  - Total: 252
- Time zone: UTC+3:30 (IRST)

Siah Chenar (Persian: سياه چنار) (Note: Also romanized as Sīāh Chenār) is a village in Goharbaran-e Jonubi Rural District of Goharbaran District in Miandorud County, Mazandaran province, Iran.

== Demographics ==
=== Population ===
At the time of the 2006 National Census, the village's population was 231 in 68 households, when it was in Miandorud-e Bozorg Rural District of the former Miandorud District in Sari County. The following census in 2011 counted 226 people in 69 households, by which time the district had been separated from the county in the establishment of Miandorud County. The rural district was transferred to the new Central District, and Siah Chenar was transferred to Goharbaran-e Jonubi Rural District created in the new Goharbaran District. The 2016 census measured the population of the village as 252 people in 86 households.
