= Qajar Kheyl-e Khurandi =

Village in Mazandaran province, Iran

Qajar Kheyl-e Khurandi Persian: قاجارخيل خورندي
- Village
- Location within Iran
- Coordinates: 36°44′16″N 53°09′16″E
- Country: Iran
- Province: Mazandaran
- County: Miandorud
- District: Goharbaran
- Rural District: Goharbaran-e Jonubi

Population (2016)
  - Total: 350
- Time zone: UTC+3:30 (IRST)

Qajar Kheyl-e Khurandi (Persian: قاجارخيل خورندي) (Note: Also romanized as Qājār Kheyl-e Khūrandī; also known as Qājār Kheyl) is a village in Goharbaran-e Jonubi Rural District of Goharbaran District in Miandorud County, Mazandaran province, Iran.

== Demographics ==
=== Population ===
At the time of the 2006 National Census, the village's population was 333 in 89 households, when it was in Miandorud-e Bozorg Rural District of the former Miandorud District in Sari County. The following census in 2011 counted 338 people in 92 households, by which time the district had been separated from the county in the establishment of Miandorud County. The rural district was transferred to the new Central District, and Qajar Kheyl-e Khurandi was transferred to Goharbaran-e Jonubi Rural District created in the new Goharbaran District. The 2016 census measured the population of the village as 350 people in 95 households.
