= Bezaminabad =

Village in Mazandaran province, Iran

Bezaminabad Persian: بزمين اباد
- Village
- Location within Iran
- Coordinates: 36°41′00″N 53°14′54″E
- Country: Iran
- Province: Mazandaran
- County: Miandorud
- District: Goharbaran
- Rural District: Goharbaran-e Jonubi

Population (2016)
  - Total: 1,000
- Time zone: UTC+3:30 (IRST)

Bezaminabad (Persian: بزمين اباد) (Note: Also romanized as Bezamīnābād; also known as Bezmīlābād) is a village in Goharbaran-e Jonubi Rural District of Goharbaran District in Miandorud County, Mazandaran province, Iran.

== Demographics ==
=== Population ===
In 1986, the village's population was 1,225 people in 246 households, of which 664 were educated. The village had water and power system, as well as a school.

At the time of the 2006 National Census, the village's population was 1,060 in 306 households, when it was in Miandorud-e Bozorg Rural District of the former Miandorud District in Sari County. The following census in 2011 counted 925 people in 309 households, by which time the district had been separated from the county in the establishment of Miandorud County. The rural district was transferred to the new Central District, and Bezaminabad was transferred to Goharbaran-e Jonubi Rural District created in the new Goharbaran District. The 2016 census measured the population of the village as 1,000 people in 348 households.
