= Abbasabad-e Holum Sar =

Village in Mazandaran province, Iran

Abbasabad-e Holum Sar Persian: عباس آباد هلوم سر
- Village
- Location within Iran
- Coordinates: 36°42′45″N 53°13′58″E
- Country: Iran
- Province: Mazandaran
- County: Miandorud
- District: Goharbaran
- Rural District: Goharbaran-e Jonubi

Population (2016)
  - Total: 985
- Time zone: UTC+3:30 (IRST)

Abbasabad-e Holum Sar (Persian: عباس آباد هلوم سر) (Note: Also romanized as ‘Abbāsābād-e Holūm Sar; also known as ‘Abbāsābād) is a village in Goharbaran-e Jonubi Rural District of Goharbaran District in Miandorud County, Mazandaran province, Iran.

== Demographics ==
=== Population ===
At the time of the 2006 National Census, the village's population was 1,118 in 286 households, when it was in Miandorud-e Bozorg Rural District of the former Miandorud District in Sari County. The following census in 2011 counted 1,011 people in 303 households, by which time the district had been separated from the county in the establishment of Miandorud County. The rural district was transferred to the new Central District, and Abbasabad-e Holum Sar was transferred to Goharbaran-e Jonubi Rural District created in the new Goharbaran District. The 2016 census measured the population of the village as 985 people in 339 households.
