= Anar Din =

Village in Mazandaran province, Iran

Anar Din Persian: اناردين
- Village
- Location within Iran
- Coordinates: 36°43′14″N 53°11′16″E
- Country: Iran
- Province: Mazandaran
- County: Miandorud
- District: Goharbaran
- Rural District: Goharbaran-e Shomali

Population (2016)
  - Total: 230
- Time zone: UTC+3:30 (IRST)

Anar Din (Persian: اناردين) (Note: Also romanized as Anār Dīn; also known as Anār ed Dīn and Anār od Dīn) is a village in Goharbaran-e Shomali Rural District of Goharbaran District in Miandorud County, Mazandaran province, Iran.

== Demographics ==
=== Population ===
At the time of the 2006 National Census, the village's population was 248 in 61 households, when it was in Miandorud-e Bozorg Rural District of the former Miandorud District in Sari County. The following census in 2011 counted 289 people in 85 households, by which time the district had been separated from the county in the establishment of Miandorud County. The rural district was transferred to the new Central District and Anar Din was transferred to Goharbaran-e Shomali Rural District created in the new Goharbaran District. The 2016 census measured the population of the village as 230 people in 80 households.
