= Ezzat ol Din =

Village in Mazandaran province, Iran

Ezzat ol Din Persian: عزت الدين
- Village
- Location within Iran
- Coordinates: 36°43′32″N 53°12′38″E
- Country: Iran
- Province: Mazandaran
- County: Miandorud
- District: Goharbaran
- Rural District: Goharbaran-e Shomali

Population (2016)
  - Total: 983
- Time zone: UTC+3:30 (IRST)

Ezzat ol Din (Persian: عزت الدين) (Note: Also romanized as ‘Ezzat ol Dīn; also known as ‘Ezzat ed Dīn, and ‘Ezzat od Dīn) is a village in Goharbaran-e Shomali Rural District of Goharbaran District in Miandorud County, Mazandaran province, Iran.

== Demographics ==
=== Population ===
At the time of the 2006 National Census, the village's population was 956 in 252 households, when it was in Miandorud-e Bozorg Rural District of the former Miandorud District in Sari County. The following census in 2011 counted 1,012 people in 302 households, by which time the district had been separated from the county in the establishment of Miandorud County. The rural district was transferred to the new Central District and Ezzat ol Din was transferred to Goharbaran-e Shomali Rural District created in the new Goharbaran District. The 2016 census measured the population of the village as 983 people in 329 households.
