= Makran, Iran =

Village in Mazandaran province, Iran

Makran Persian: ماكران
- Village
- Location within Iran
- Coordinates: 36°42′17″N 53°13′38″E
- Country: Iran
- Province: Mazandaran
- County: Miandorud
- District: Goharbaran
- Rural District: Goharbaran-e Jonubi

Population (2016)
  - Total: 1,498
- Time zone: UTC+3:30 (IRST)

Makran (Persian: ماكران) (Note: Also romanized as Mākerān and Mākrān) is a village in, and the capital of, Goharbaran-e Jonubi Rural District in Goharbaran District of Miandorud County, Mazandaran province, Iran.

== Demographics ==
=== Population ===
At the time of the 2006 National Census, the village's population was 1,601 in 448 households, when it was in Miandorud-e Bozorg Rural District of the former Miandorud District in Sari County. The following census in 2011 counted 1,660 people in 498 households, by which time the district had been separated from the county in the establishment of Miandorud County. The rural district was transferred to the new Central District, and Makran was transferred to Goharbaran-e Jonubi Rural District created in the new Goharbaran District. The 2016 census measured the population of the village as 1,498 people in 509 households, the most populous in its rural district.
