= Var Kola, Miandorud =

Village in Mazandaran province, Iran

Var Kola Persian: وركلا
- Village
- Location within Iran
- Coordinates: 36°40′27″N 53°11′46″E
- Country: Iran
- Province: Mazandaran
- County: Miandorud
- District: Goharbaran
- Rural District: Goharbaran-e Jonubi

Population (2016)
  - Total: 403
- Time zone: UTC+3:30 (IRST)

Var Kola (Persian: وركلا) (Note: Also romanized as Var Kalā and Var Kolā; also known as Var Kūlā) is a village in Goharbaran-e Jonubi Rural District of Goharbaran District in Miandorud County, Mazandaran province, Iran.

== Demographics ==
=== Population ===
At the time of the 2006 National Census, the village's population was 478 in 126 households, when it was in Miandorud-e Bozorg Rural District of the former Miandorud District in Sari County. The following census in 2011 counted 518 people in 160 households, by which time the district had been separated from the county in the establishment of Miandorud County. The rural district was transferred to the new Central District, and Var Kola was transferred to Goharbaran-e Jonubi Rural District created in the new Goharbaran District. The 2016 census measured the population of the village as 403 people in 149 households.
