= Bargeh =

Village in Mazandaran province, Iran

Bargeh Persian: برگه
- Village
- Location within Iran
- Coordinates: 36°47′59″N 53°12′46″E
- Country: Iran
- Province: Mazandaran
- County: Miandorud
- District: Goharbaran
- Rural District: Goharbaran-e Shomali

Population (2016)
  - Total: 1,447
- Time zone: UTC+3:30 (IRST)

Bargeh (Persian: برگه) is a village in Goharbaran-e Shomali Rural District of Goharbaran District in Miandorud County, Mazandaran province, Iran.

== Demographics ==
=== Population ===
At the time of the 2006 National Census, the village's population was 1,648 in 464 households, when it was in Miandorud-e Bozorg Rural District of the former Miandorud District in Sari County. The following census in 2011 counted 1,845 people in 579 households, by which time the district had been separated from the county in the establishment of Miandorud County. The rural district was transferred to the new Central District and Bargeh was transferred to Goharbaran-e Shomali Rural District created in the new Goharbaran District. The 2016 census measured the population of the village as 1,447 people in 499 households.
