= Kia Pey =

Village in Mazandaran province, Iran

Kia Pey Persian: كياپي
- Village
- Location within Iran
- Coordinates: 36°33′32″N 53°12′12″E
- Country: Iran
- Province: Mazandaran
- County: Miandorud
- District: Central
- Rural District: Kuhdasht-e Gharbi

Population (2016)
  - Total: 844
- Time zone: UTC+3:30 (IRST)

Kia Pey (Persian: كياپي) (Note: Also romanized as Keyā Pey and Kīā Pey) is a village in Kuhdasht-e Gharbi Rural District of the Central District in Miandorud County, Mazandaran province, Iran.

== Demographics ==
=== Population ===
At the time of the 2006 National Census, the village's population was 795 in 196 households, when it was in Kuhdasht Rural District (Note: Renamed Kuhdasht-e Sharqi Rural District) of the former Miandorud District in Sari County. The following census in 2011 counted 809 people in 245 households, by which time the district had been separated from the county in the establishment of Miandorud County. The rural district was transferred to the new Central District and renamed Kuhdasht-e Sharqi Rural District. Kia Pey was transferred to Kuhdasht-e Gharbi Rural District created in the same district. The 2016 census measured the population of the village as 844 people in 266 households.
