= Badeleh =

Village in Mazandaran province, Iran

Badeleh Persian: بادله
- Village
- Location within Iran
- Coordinates: 36°34′51″N 53°10′56″E
- Country: Iran
- Province: Mazandaran
- County: Miandorud
- District: Central
- Rural District: Kuhdasht-e Gharbi

Population (2016)
  - Total: 1,890
- Time zone: UTC+3:30 (IRST)

Badeleh (Persian: بادله) (Note: Also romanized as Bādeleh and Badleh) is a village in Kuhdasht-e Gharbi Rural District of the Central District in Miandorud County, Mazandaran province, Iran.

== Demographics ==
=== Population ===
At the time of the 2006 National Census, the village's population was 1,810 in 492 households, when it was in Kuhdasht Rural District (Note: Renamed Kuhdasht-e Sharqi Rural District) of the former Miandorud District in Sari County. The following census in 2011 counted 1,985 people in 586 households, by which time the district had been separated from the county in the establishment of Miandorud County. The rural district was transferred to the new Central District and renamed Kuhdasht-e Sharqi Rural District. Badeleh was transferred to Kuhdasht-e Gharbi Rural District created in the same district. The 2016 census measured the population of the village as 1,890 people in 630 households.
