= Tajan Lateh-ye Sofla =

Village in Mazandaran province, Iran

Tajan Lateh-ye Sofla Persian: تجن لته سفلي
- Village
- Location within Iran
- Coordinates: 36°48′43″N 53°10′18″E
- Country: Iran
- Province: Mazandaran
- County: Miandorud
- District: Goharbaran
- Rural District: Goharbaran-e Shomali

Population (2016)
  - Total: 418
- Time zone: UTC+3:30 (IRST)

Tajan Lateh-ye Sofla (Persian: تجن لته سفلي) (Note: Also romanized as Tajan Lateh-ye Soflá) is a village in Goharbaran-e Shomali Rural District of Goharbaran District in Miandorud County, Mazandaran province, Iran.

== Demographics ==
=== Population ===
At the time of the 2006 National Census, the village's population was 376 in 86 households, when it was in Miandorud-e Bozorg Rural District of the former Miandorud District in Sari County. The following census in 2011 counted 416 people in 149 households, by which time the district had been separated from the county in the establishment of Miandorud County. The rural district was transferred to the new Central District and Tajan Lateh-ye Sofla was transferred to Goharbaran-e Shomali Rural District created in the new Goharbaran District. The 2016 census measured the population of the village as 418 people in 138 households.
