= Asiab Sar, Miandorud =

Village in Mazandaran province, Iran

Asiab Sar Persian: اسيابسر
- Village
- Location within Iran
- Coordinates: 36°40′46″N 53°14′19″E
- Country: Iran
- Province: Mazandaran
- County: Miandorud
- District: Goharbaran
- Rural District: Goharbaran-e Jonubi

Population (2016)
  - Total: 173
- Time zone: UTC+3:30 (IRST)

Asiab Sar (Persian: اسيابسر) (Note: Also romanized as Āsīāb Sar) is a village in Goharbaran-e Jonubi Rural District of Goharbaran District in Miandorud County, Mazandaran province, Iran.

== Demographics ==
=== Population ===
At the time of the 2006 National Census, the village's population was 176 in 47 households, when it was in Miandorud-e Bozorg Rural District of the former Miandorud District in Sari County. The following census in 2011 counted 178 people in 52 households, by which time the district had been separated from the county in the establishment of Miandorud County. The rural district was transferred to the new Central District, and Asiab Sar was transferred to Goharbaran-e Jonubi Rural District created in the new Goharbaran District. The 2016 census measured the population of the village as 173 people in 55 households.
