= Darab Kola =

Village in Mazandaran province, Iran

Darab Kola Persian: دارابكلا
- Village
- Location within Iran
- Coordinates: 36°33′40″N 53°15′13″E
- Country: Iran
- Province: Mazandaran
- County: Miandorud
- District: Central
- Rural District: Kuhdasht-e Gharbi

Population (2016)
  - Total: 5,262
- Time zone: UTC+3:30 (IRST)

Darab Kola (Persian: دارابكلا) (Note: Also romanized as Dārāb Kalā and Dārāb Kolā; also known as Dārab Qal‘eh) is a village in, and the capital of, Kuhdasht-e Gharbi Rural District in the Central District of Miandorud County, Mazandaran province, Iran.

== Demographics ==
=== Population ===
At the time of the 2006 National Census, the village's population was 4,661 in 1,170 households, when it was in Kuhdasht Rural District (Note: Renamed Kuhdasht-e Sharqi Rural District) of the former Miandorud District in Sari County. The following census in 2011 counted 5,139 people in 1,461 households, by which time the district had been separated from the county in the establishment of Miandorud County. The rural district was transferred to the new Central District and renamed Kuhdasht-e Sharqi Rural District. Darab Kola was transferred to Kuhdasht-e Gharbi Rural District created in the same district. The 2016 census measured the population of the village as 5,262 people in 1,678 households, the most populous in its rural district.
