= Tajan Lateh-ye Olya =

Village in Mazandaran province, Iran

Tajan Lateh-ye Olya Persian: تجن لته عليا
- Village
- Location within Iran
- Coordinates: 36°48′24″N 53°10′40″E
- Country: Iran
- Province: Mazandaran
- County: Miandorud
- District: Goharbaran
- Rural District: Goharbaran-e Shomali

Population (2016)
  - Total: 240
- Time zone: UTC+3:30 (IRST)

Tajan Lateh-ye Olya (Persian: تجن لته عليا) (Note: Also romanized as Tajan Lateh-ye ‘Olyā) is a village in Goharbaran-e Shomali Rural District of Goharbaran District in Miandorud County, Mazandaran province, Iran.

== Demographics ==
=== Population ===
At the time of the 2006 National Census, the village's population was 262 in 66 households, when it was in Miandorud-e Bozorg Rural District of the former Miandorud District in Sari County. The following census in 2011 counted 253 people in 82 households, by which time the district had been separated from the county in the establishment of Miandorud County. The rural district was transferred to the new Central District and Tajan Lateh-ye Olya was transferred to Goharbaran-e Shomali Rural District created in the new Goharbaran District. The 2016 census measured the population of the village as 240 people in 82 households.
