= Sur Bon, Miandorud =

Village in Mazandaran province, Iran

Sur Bon Persian: سوربن
- Village
- Location within Iran
- Coordinates: 36°41′48″N 53°09′39″E
- Country: Iran
- Province: Mazandaran
- County: Miandorud
- District: Goharbaran
- Rural District: Goharbaran-e Jonubi

Population (2016)
  - Total: 518
- Time zone: UTC+3:30 (IRST)

Sur Bon (Persian: سوربن) (Note: Also romanized as Sūr Bon) is a village in Goharbaran-e Jonubi Rural District of Goharbaran District in Miandorud County, Mazandaran province, Iran.

== Demographics ==
=== Population ===
At the time of the 2006 National Census, the village's population was 670 in 191 households, when it was in Miandorud-e Bozorg Rural District of the former Miandorud District in Sari County. The following census in 2011 counted 570 people in 169 households, by which time the district had been separated from the county in the establishment of Miandorud County. The rural district was transferred to the new Central District, and Sur Bon was transferred to Goharbaran-e Jonubi Rural District created in the new Goharbaran District. The 2016 census measured the population of the village as 518 people in 174 households.
