= Saneh Kuh =

Village in Mazandaran province, Iran

Saneh Kuh Persian: سنه كوه
- Village
- Location within Iran
- Coordinates: 36°27′54″N 53°23′45″E
- Country: Iran
- Province: Mazandaran
- County: Miandorud
- District: Central
- Rural District: Kuhdasht-e Gharbi

Population (2016)
  - Total: 136
- Time zone: UTC+3:30 (IRST)

Saneh Kuh (Persian: سنه كوه) (Note: Also romanized as Saneh Kūh; also known as Saneh Kū and Senūr) is a village in Kuhdasht-e Gharbi Rural District of the Central District in Miandorud County, Mazandaran province, Iran.

== Demographics ==
=== Population ===
At the time of the 2006 National Census, the village's population was 80 in 22 households, when it was in Kuhdasht Rural District (Note: Renamed Kuhdasht-e Sharqi Rural District) of the former Miandorud District in Sari County. The following census in 2011 counted 113 people in 45 households, by which time the district had been separated from the county in the establishment of Miandorud County. The rural district was transferred to the new Central District and renamed Kuhdasht-e Sharqi Rural District. Saneh Kuh was transferred to Kuhdasht-e Gharbi Rural District created in the same district. The 2016 census measured the population of the village as 136 people in 49 households.
