= Owsa =

Village in Mazandaran province, Iran

Owsa Persian: اوسا
- Village
- Location within Iran
- Coordinates: 36°32′39″N 53°15′25″E
- Country: Iran
- Province: Mazandaran
- County: Miandorud
- District: Central
- Rural District: Kuhdasht-e Gharbi

Population (2016)
  - Total: 714
- Time zone: UTC+3:30 (IRST)

Owsa (Persian: اوسا) (Note: Also known as Osā and Osās) is a village in Kuhdasht-e Gharbi Rural District of the Central District in Miandorud County, Mazandaran province, Iran.

== Demographics ==
=== Population ===
At the time of the 2006 National Census, the village's population was 669 in 165 households, when it was in Kuhdasht Rural District (Note: Renamed Kuhdasht-e Sharqi Rural District) of the former Miandorud District in Sari County. The following census in 2011 counted 694 people in 203 households, by which time the district had been separated from the county in the establishment of Miandorud County. The rural district was transferred to the new Central District and renamed Kuhdasht-e Sharqi Rural District. Owsa was transferred to Kuhdasht-e Gharbi Rural District created in the same district. The 2016 census measured the population of the village as 714 people in 230 households.
