= Lalim, Mazandaran =

Village in Mazandaran province, Iran

Lalim Persian: لاليم
- Village
- Location within Iran
- Coordinates: 36°34′32″N 53°12′50″E
- Country: Iran
- Province: Mazandaran
- County: Miandorud
- District: Central
- Rural District: Kuhdasht-e Gharbi

Population (2016)
  - Total: 1,584
- Time zone: UTC+3:30 (IRST)

Lalim (Persian: لاليم) (Note: Also romanized as Lālīm) is a village in Kuhdasht-e Gharbi Rural District of the Central District in Miandorud County, Mazandaran province, Iran.

== Demographics ==
=== Population ===
At the time of the 2006 National Census, the village's population was 1,396 in 360 households, when it was in Kuhdasht Rural District (Note: Renamed Kuhdasht-e Sharqi Rural District) of the former Miandorud District in Sari County. The following census in 2011 counted 1,373 people in 407 households, by which time the district had been separated from the county in the establishment of Miandorud County. The rural district was transferred to the new Central District and renamed Kuhdasht-e Sharqi Rural District. Lalim was transferred to Kuhdasht-e Gharbi Rural District created in the same district. The 2016 census measured the population of the village as 1,584 people in 513 households.
