= Anjil Nesam =

Village in Mazandaran province, Iran

Anjil Nesam Persian: انجيل نسام
- Village
- Location within Iran
- Coordinates: 36°35′09″N 53°11′27″E
- Country: Iran
- Province: Mazandaran
- County: Miandorud
- District: Central
- Rural District: Kuhdasht-e Gharbi

Population (2016)
  - Total: 396
- Time zone: UTC+3:30 (IRST)

Anjil Nesam (Persian: انجيل نسام) (Note: Also romanized as Anjīl Nesām; also known as Anjīl Nesā) is a village in Kuhdasht-e Gharbi Rural District of the Central District in Miandorud County, Mazandaran province, Iran.

== Demographics ==
=== Population ===
At the time of the 2006 National Census, the village's population was 451 in 118 households, when it was in Kuhdasht Rural District (Note: Renamed Kuhdasht-e Sharqi Rural District) of the former Miandorud District in Sari County. The following census in 2011 counted 421 people in 127 households, by which time the district had been separated from the county in the establishment of Miandorud County. The rural district was transferred to the new Central District and renamed Kuhdasht-e Sharqi Rural District. Anjil Nesam was transferred to Kuhdasht-e Gharbi Rural District created in the same district. The 2016 census measured the population of the village as 396 people in 132 households.
