= Zari Mahalleh =

Village in Mazandaran province, Iran

Zari Mahalleh Persian: زاري محله
- Village
- Location within Iran
- Coordinates: 36°38′28″N 53°11′09″E
- Country: Iran
- Province: Mazandaran
- County: Miandorud
- District: Central
- Rural District: Miandorud-e Bozorg

Population (2016)
  - Total: 24
- Time zone: UTC+3:30 (IRST)

Zari Mahalleh (Persian: زاري محله) (Note: Also romanized as Zārī Maḩalleh; also known as Zāre‘ Maḩalleh) is a village in Miandorud-e Bozorg Rural District of the Central District in Miandorud County, Mazandaran province, Iran.

== Demographics ==
=== Population ===
At the time of the 2006 National Census, the village's population was 21 in seven households, when it was in the former Miandorud District of Sari County. The following census in 2011 counted a population below the reporting threshold, by which time the district had been separated from the county in the establishment of Miandorud County. The rural district was transferred to the new Central District. The 2016 census measured the population of the village as 24 people in 11 households.
