= Neka Chub Company =

Factory in Mazandaran province, Iran

Sherkat-e Neka Chub Persian: شركت نكاچوب
- Industrial Facility
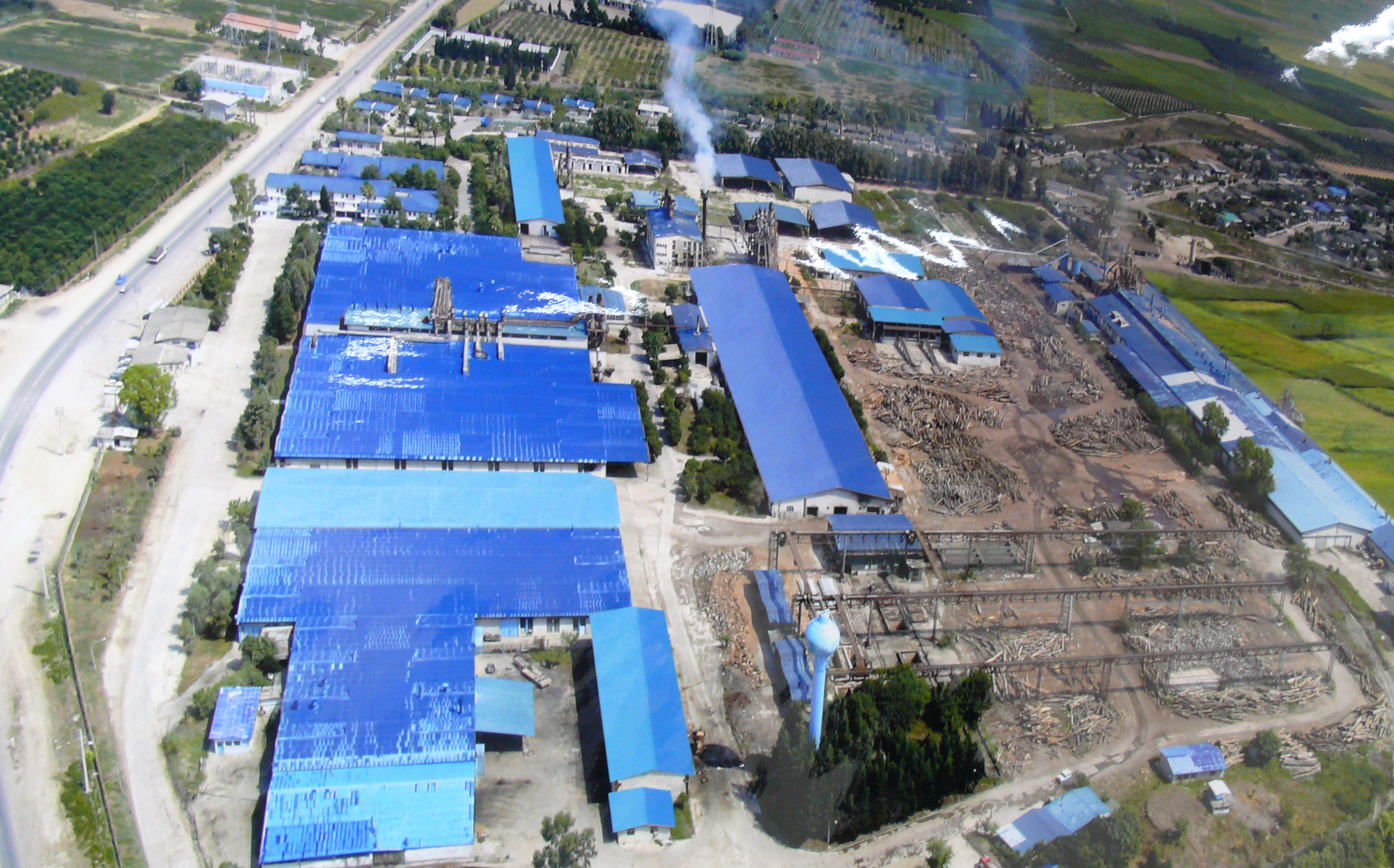
- Aerial image of Sherkat-e Neka Chub

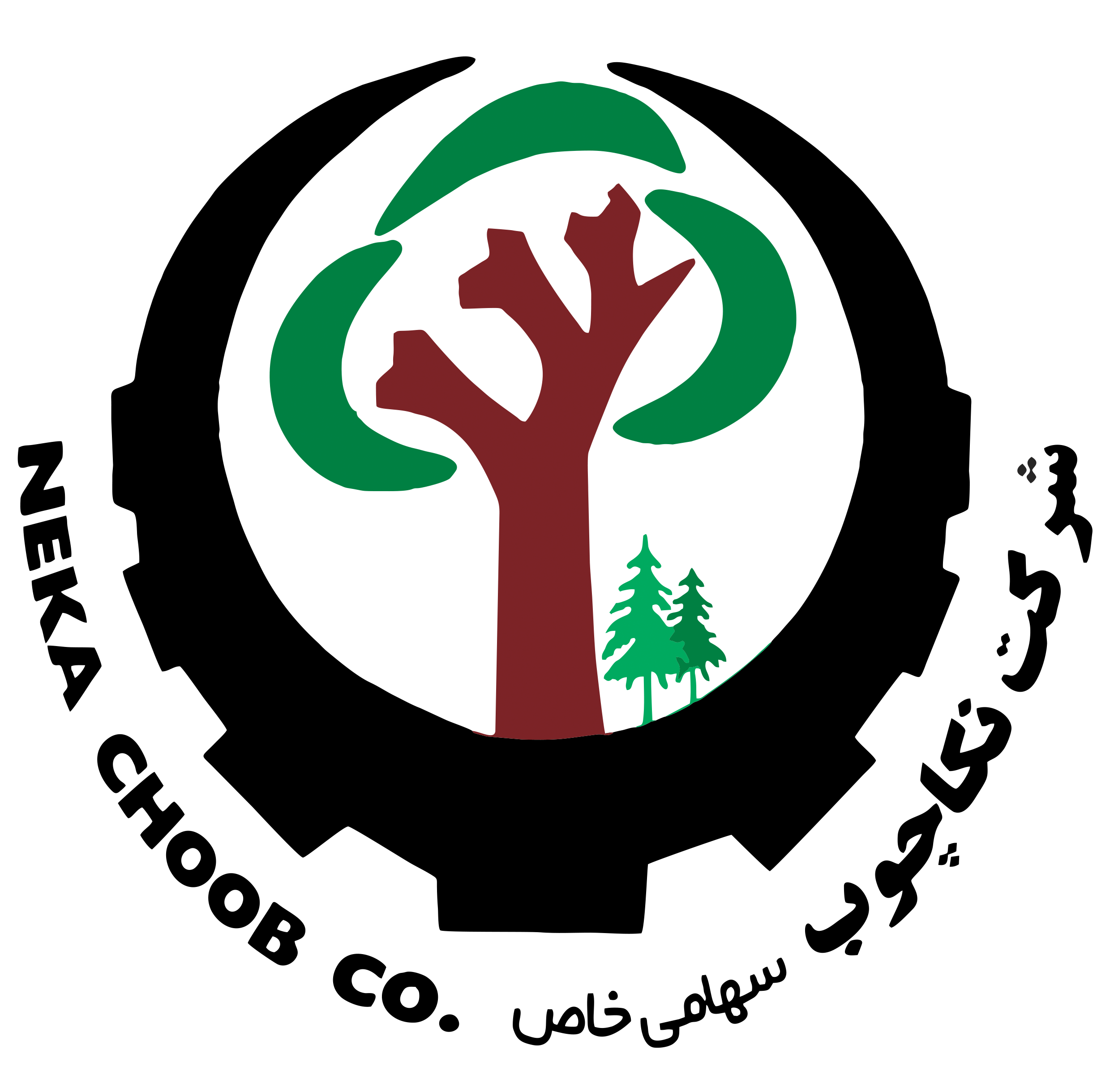
- Flag

- Location within Iran
- Coordinates: 36°37′02″N 53°13′00″E
- Country: Iran
- Province: Mazandaran
- County: Miandorud
- District: Central
- Rural District: Miandorud-e Bozorg
- Established: 1969

Government
  - Chairman: Dr. Seyyed Kamran Yeganegi

Population (2016)
  - Total: 176
- Time zone: UTC+3:30 (IRST)

Sherkat-e Neka Chub (Persian: شركت نكاچوب) (Note: Also romanized as Sherkat-e Nekā Chūb; English: Neka Wood Company) is an industrial facility registered as an abadi in Miandorud-e Bozorg Rural District of the Central District in Miandorud County, Mazandaran province, Iran.

The company's activities include the exploitation of forests, the preparation and implementation of forestry plans, the establishment and operation of wood industry factories, and the production of wood products such as plain chipboard, melamine chipboard, plywood, veneer, and various types of boards.

== History ==
Neka Chub was founded as a Joint-stock company in July 1969. The operation of the industrial factory began in 1973.

The factory's wooden furniture, door, and box-making production activities were abandoned in 2003 due to being unprofitable and uneconomical. The four main production lines went under maintenance in 2019 and restarted working in 2021.

== Demographics ==
=== Population ===
At the time of the 2006 National Census, the locality's population was 363 in 91 households, when it was in the former Miandorud District of Sari County. The following census in 2011 counted 246 people in 67 households, by which time the district had been separated from the county in the establishment of Miandorud County. The rural district was transferred to the new Central District. The 2016 census measured the population of the locality as 176 people in 54 households.
