= Shahriar Kandeh =

Village in Mazandaran province, Iran

Shahriar Kandeh Persian: شهریارکنده
- Village
- Location within Iran
- Coordinates: 36°37′55″N 53°11′58″E
- Country: Iran
- Province: Mazandaran
- County: Miandorud
- District: Central
- Rural District: Miandorud-e Bozorg

Population (2016)
  - Total: 1,565
- Time zone: UTC+3:30 (IRST)

Shahriar Kandeh (Persian: شهریارکنده) (Note: Also romanized as Shahrīār Kandeh) is a village in Miandorud-e Bozorg Rural District of the Central District in Miandorud County, Mazandaran province, Iran.

== Demographics ==
=== Population ===
At the time of the 2006 National Census, the village's population was 1,464 in 391 households, when it was in the former Miandorud District of Sari County. The following census in 2011 counted 1,616 people in 485 households, by which time the district had been separated from the county in the establishment of Miandorud County. The rural district was transferred to the new Central District. The 2016 census measured the population of the village as 1,565 people in 506 households.
