= Eslamabad, Miandorud =

Village in Mazandaran province, Iran

Eslamabad Persian: اسلام اباد
- Village
- Location within Iran
- Coordinates: 36°37′49″N 53°12′44″E
- Country: Iran
- Province: Mazandaran
- County: Miandorud
- District: Central
- Rural District: Miandorud-e Bozorg

Population (2016)
  - Total: 3,997
- Time zone: UTC+3:30 (IRST)

Eslamabad (Persian: اسلام اباد) (Note: Also romanized as Eslāmābād) is a village in, and the capital of, Miandorud-e Bozorg Rural District in the Central District of Miandorud County, Mazandaran province, Iran.

== Demographics ==
=== Population ===
At the time of the 2006 National Census, the village's population was 3,362 in 904 households, when it was in the former Miandorud District of Sari County. The following census in 2011 counted 3,912 people in 1,129 households, by which time the district had been separated from the county in the establishment of Miandorud County. The rural district was transferred to the new Central District. The 2016 census measured the population of the village as 3,997 people in 1,261 households, the most populous in its rural district.
