= Jam Khaneh =

Village in Mazandaran province, Iran

Jam Khaneh Persian: جامخانه
- Village
- Location within Iran
- Coordinates: 36°35′23″N 53°15′20″E
- Country: Iran
- Province: Mazandaran
- County: Miandorud
- District: Central
- Rural District: Kuhdasht-e Sharqi

Population (2016)
  - Total: 5,173
- Time zone: UTC+3:30 (IRST)

Jam Khaneh (Persian: جامخانه) (Note: Also romanized as Jām Khāneh) is a village in, and the capital of, Kuhdasht-e Sharqi Rural District (Note: Formerly Kuhdasht Rural District) in the Central District of Miandorud County, Mazandaran province, Iran. The previous capital of the rural district was the village of Surak, now a city.

== Demographics ==
=== Population ===
At the time of the 2006 National Census, the village's population was 4,847 in 1,188 households, when it was in Kuhdasht Rural District (Note: Renamed Kuhdasht-e Sharqi Rural District) of the former Miandorud District in Sari County. The following census in 2011 counted 5,452 people in 1,562 households, by which time the district had been separated from the county in the establishment of Miandorud County. The rural district was transferred to the new Central District and renamed Kuhdasht-e Sharqi Rural District. The 2016 census measured the population of the village as 5,173 people in 1,661 households, the most populous in its rural district.
