= Safarabad, Miandorud =

Village in Mazandaran province, Iran

Safarabad Persian: صفراباد
- Village
- Location within Iran
- Coordinates: 36°36′50″N 53°15′16″E
- Country: Iran
- Province: Mazandaran
- County: Miandorud
- District: Central
- Rural District: Kuhdasht-e Sharqi

Population (2016)
  - Total: 85
- Time zone: UTC+3:30 (IRST)

Safarabad (Persian: صفراباد) (Note: Also romanized as Şafarābād) is a village in Kuhdasht-e Sharqi Rural District (Note: Formerly Kuhdasht Rural District) of the Central District in Miandorud County, Mazandaran province, Iran.

== Demographics ==
=== Population ===
At the time of the 2006 National Census, the village's population was 85 in 19 households, when it was in Kuhdasht Rural District (Note: Renamed Kuhdasht-e Sharqi Rural District) of the former Miandorud District in Sari County. The following census in 2011 counted 76 people in 18 households, by which time the district had been separated from the county in the establishment of Miandorud County. The rural district was transferred to the new Central District and renamed Kuhdasht-e Sharqi Rural District. The 2016 census measured the population of the village as 85 people in 27 households.
