= Gahrbaran =

Gahrbaran (Persian: گهرباران) may refer to:

- Gahrbaran District
- Gahrbaran-e Jonubi Rural District
- Gahrbaran-e Shomali Rural District
