= Mohammadabad, Miandorud-e Bozorg =

Village in Mazandaran province, Iran

Mohammadabad Persian: محمداباد
- Village
- Location within Iran
- Coordinates: 36°37′57″N 53°12′10″E
- Country: Iran
- Province: Mazandaran
- County: Miandorud
- District: Central
- Rural District: Miandorud-e Bozorg

Population (2016)
  - Total: 242
- Time zone: UTC+3:30 (IRST)

Mohammadabad (Persian: محمداباد) (Note: Also romanized as Moḩammadābād) is a village in Miandorud-e Bozorg Rural District of the Central District in Miandorud County, Mazandaran province, Iran.

== Demographics ==
=== Population ===
At the time of the 2006 National Census, the village's population was 272 in 71 households, when it was in the former Miandorud District of Sari County. The following census in 2011 counted 255 people in 77 households, by which time the district had been separated from the county in the establishment of Miandorud County. The rural district was transferred to the new Central District. The 2016 census measured the population of the village as 242 people in 83 households.
