= Tabaqdeh =

City in Mazandaran province, Iran

Tabaqdeh Persian: طبق ده
- City
- Location within Iran
- Coordinates: 36°45′42″N 53°12′11″E
- Country: Iran
- Province: Mazandaran
- County: Miandorud
- District: Goharbaran
- Established as a city: 2020

Government
  - Mayor: Morteza Arab

Population (2016)
  - Total: 2,023
- Time zone: UTC+3:30 (IRST)

Tabaqdeh (Persian: طبق ده) (Note: Also romanized as Ţabaqdeh) is a city in, and the capital of, Goharbaran District in Miandorud County, Mazandaran province, Iran. It also serves as the administrative center for Goharbaran-e Shomali Rural District.

== Demographics ==
=== Population ===
Population history: Tabaqdeh
Year	Pop.	±%
1950	900	—
1966	1,566	+74.0%
1976	1,745	+11.4%
1986	2,295	+31.5%
2006	2,197	−4.3%
2011	2,079	−5.4%
2016	2,023	−2.7%

At the 1966 census, Tabaqdeh was a village in Miyanrud Rural District of Sari County, with a population of 1,566 people in 259 households. The agricultural products of the village included Cotton, Rice, Barley and Wheat.

In the 1976 census, the village of Tabaqdeh was in the former Miandorud Rural District of Sari County. Its population was 1,745 people in 312 households. Tabaqdeh did not have tap water, but had power and an elementary school, as well as a clinic.

In the 1986 census, the village's population was 2,295 people in 440 households. Agricultural activities included farming, animal husbandry, livestock, and gardening.

At the time of the 2006 National Census, the village's population was 2,197 in 625 households, when it was in Miandorud-e Bozorg Rural District of the former Miandorud District in Sari County. The following census in 2011 counted 2,079 people in 639 households, by which time the district had been separated from the county in the establishment of Miandorud County. The rural district was transferred to the new Central District and Tabaqdeh was transferred to Goharbaran-e Shomali Rural District created in the new Goharbaran District. The 2016 census measured the population of the village as 2,023 people in 723 households, the most populous in its rural district.

Tabaqdeh was converted to a city in 2020, and its first mayor started working in February 2021.
