= Palang Azad =

Village in Mazandaran province, Iran

Palang Azad Persian: پلنگ ازاد
- Village
- Location within Iran
- Coordinates: 36°37′20″N 53°11′22″E
- Country: Iran
- Province: Mazandaran
- County: Miandorud
- District: Central
- Rural District: Miandorud-e Bozorg

Population (2016)
  - Total: 422
- Time zone: UTC+3:30 (IRST)

Palang Azad (Persian: پلنگ ازاد) (Note: Also romanized as Palang Āzād) is a village in Miandorud-e Bozorg Rural District of the Central District in Miandorud County, Mazandaran province, Iran.

== Demographics ==
=== Population ===
At the time of the 2006 National Census, the village's population was 452 in 126 households, when it was in the former Miandorud District of Sari County. The following census in 2011 counted 439 people in 133 households, by which time the district had been separated from the county in the establishment of Miandorud County. The rural district was transferred to the new Central District. The 2016 census measured the population of the village as 422 people in 148 households.
