= Bisheh Sar =

Village in Mazandaran province, Iran

Bisheh Sar Persian: بيشه سر
- Village
- Location within Iran
- Coordinates: 36°37′28″N 53°11′04″E
- Country: Iran
- Province: Mazandaran
- County: Miandorud
- District: Central
- Rural District: Miandorud-e Bozorg

Population (2016)
  - Total: 464
- Time zone: UTC+3:30 (IRST)

Bisheh Sar (Persian: بيشه سر) (Note: Also romanized as Bīsheh Sar) is a village in Miandorud-e Bozorg Rural District of the Central District in Miandorud County, Mazandaran province, Iran.

== Demographics ==
=== Population ===
At the time of the 2006 National Census, the village's population was 506 in 144 households, when it was in the former Miandorud District of Sari County. The following census in 2011 counted 477 people in 146 households, by which time the district had been separated from the county in the establishment of Miandorud County. The rural district was transferred to the new Central District. The 2016 census measured the population of the village as 464 people in 167 households.
