= Tazehabad-e Sepah =

Village in Mazandaran province, Iran

Tazehabad-e Sepah Persian: تازه ابادسپاه
- Village
- Location within Iran
- Coordinates: 36°48′50″N 53°07′55″E
- Country: Iran
- Province: Mazandaran
- County: Miandorud
- District: Goharbaran
- Rural District: Goharbaran-e Shomali

Population (2016)
  - Total: 271
- Time zone: UTC+3:30 (IRST)

Tazehabad-e Sepah (Persian: تازه ابادسپاه) (Note: Also romanized as Tāzehābād Sepāh and Tāzehābād-e Sepāh) is a village in Goharbaran-e Shomali Rural District of Goharbaran District in Miandorud County, Mazandaran province, Iran.

== Demographics ==
=== Population ===
At the time of the 2006 National Census, the village's population was 217 in 55 households, when it was in Rudpey-ye Shomali Rural District (Note: Renamed Farahabad-e Jonubi Rural District) of the Central District in Sari County. The following census in 2011 counted 217 people in 66 households, by which time the rural district had been separated from the district in the formation of Rudpey-ye Shomali District and renamed Farahabad-e Shomali Rural District. Tazehabad-e Sepah was separated from the county in the establishment of Miandorud County and transferred to Goharbaran-e Shomali Rural District created in the new Goharbaran District. The 2016 census measured the population of the village as 271 people in 92 households.
