= Tajan Lateh =

Tajan Lateh (Persian: تجن لته) may refer to:

- Tajan Lateh-ye Olya
- Tajan Lateh-ye Sofla
