= Hasanabad, Miandorud =

Village in Mazandaran province, Iran

Hasanabad Persian: حسن اباد
- Village
- Location within Iran
- Coordinates: 36°48′25″N 53°08′10″E
- Country: Iran
- Province: Mazandaran
- County: Miandorud
- District: Goharbaran
- Rural District: Goharbaran-e Shomali

Population (2016)
  - Total: 96
- Time zone: UTC+3:30 (IRST)

Hasanabad (Persian: حسن اباد) (Note: Also romanized as Ḩasanābād; also known as Tāzehābād) is a village in Goharbaran-e Shomali Rural District of Goharbaran District in Miandorud County, Mazandaran province, Iran. It is located on the Caspian Sea.

== Demographics ==
=== Population ===
At the time of the 2006 National Census, the village's population was 80 in 20 households, when it was in Rudpey-ye Shomali Rural District (Note: Renamed Farahabad-e Jonubi Rural District) of the Central District in Sari County. The following census in 2011 counted 95 people in 40 households, by which time the rural district had been separated from the district in the formation of Rudpey-ye Shomali District and renamed Farahabad-e Shomali Rural District. Hasanabad was separated from the county in the establishment of Miandorud County and transferred to Goharbaran-e Shomali Rural District created in the new Goharbaran District. The 2016 census measured the population of the village as 96 people in 35 households.
