= Zeyt-e Olya =

Village in Mazandaran province, Iran

Zeyt-e Olya Persian: زيت عليا
- Village
- Location within Iran
- Coordinates: 36°38′23″N 53°12′51″E
- Country: Iran
- Province: Mazandaran
- County: Miandorud
- District: Central
- Rural District: Miandorud-e Bozorg

Population (2016)
  - Total: 946
- Time zone: UTC+3:30 (IRST)

Zeyt-e Olya (Persian: زيت عليا) (Note: Also romanized as Zeyt-e ‘Olyā; also known as Bālā Zeyd and Zeyt-e Bālā) is a village in Miandorud-e Bozorg Rural District of the Central District in Miandorud County, Mazandaran province, Iran.

== Demographics ==
=== Population ===
At the time of the 2006 National Census, the village's population was 908 in 247 households, when it was in the former Miandorud District of Sari County. The following census in 2011 counted 920 people in 282 households, by which time the district had been separated from the county in the establishment of Miandorud County. The rural district was transferred to the new Central District. The 2016 census measured the population of the village as 946 people in 331 households.
