= Zeyt-e Sofla =

Village in Mazandaran province, Iran

Zeyt-e Sofla Persian: زيت سفلي
- Village
- Location within Iran
- Coordinates: 36°39′04″N 53°12′27″E
- Country: Iran
- Province: Mazandaran
- County: Miandorud
- District: Central
- Rural District: Miandorud-e Bozorg

Population (2016)
  - Total: 1,766
- Time zone: UTC+3:30 (IRST)

Zeyt-e Sofla (Persian: زيت سفلي) (Note: Also romanized as Zeyt-e Soflá; also known as Pā’īn Zeyd and Zeyt-e Pā’īn) is a village in Miandorud-e Bozorg Rural District of the Central District in Miandorud County, Mazandaran province, Iran.

== Demographics ==
=== Population ===
At the time of the 2006 National Census, the village's population was 1,610 in 446 households, when it was in the former Miandorud District of Sari County. The following census in 2011 counted 1,767 people in 519 households, by which time the district had been separated from the county in the establishment of Miandorud County. The rural district was transferred to the new Central District. The 2016 census measured the population of the village as 1,766 people in 598 households.
