= Kuhdasht (disambiguation) =

Kuhdasht (Persian: کوهدشت) may refer to the following places in Iran:

- Kuh Dasht Rural District, an administrative division of Kashan County, Isfahan province
- Kuhdasht, the capital city of Kuhdasht County, Lorestan province
- Kuhdasht County, an administrative division of Lorestan province
- Kuhdasht-e Jonubi Rural District, an administrative division of Kuhdasht County, Lorestan province
- Kuhdasht-e Shomali Rural District an administrative division of Kuhdasht County, Lorestan province
- Kuhdasht Rural District a former administrative division of Sari County, Mazandaran province
- Kuhdasht-e Gharbi Rural District an administrative division of Miandorud County, Mazandaran province
- Kuhdasht-e Sharqi Rural District an administrative division of Miandorud County, Mazandaran province
