= Bazyar Kheyl =

Bazyar Kheyl بازيارخيل
- Village
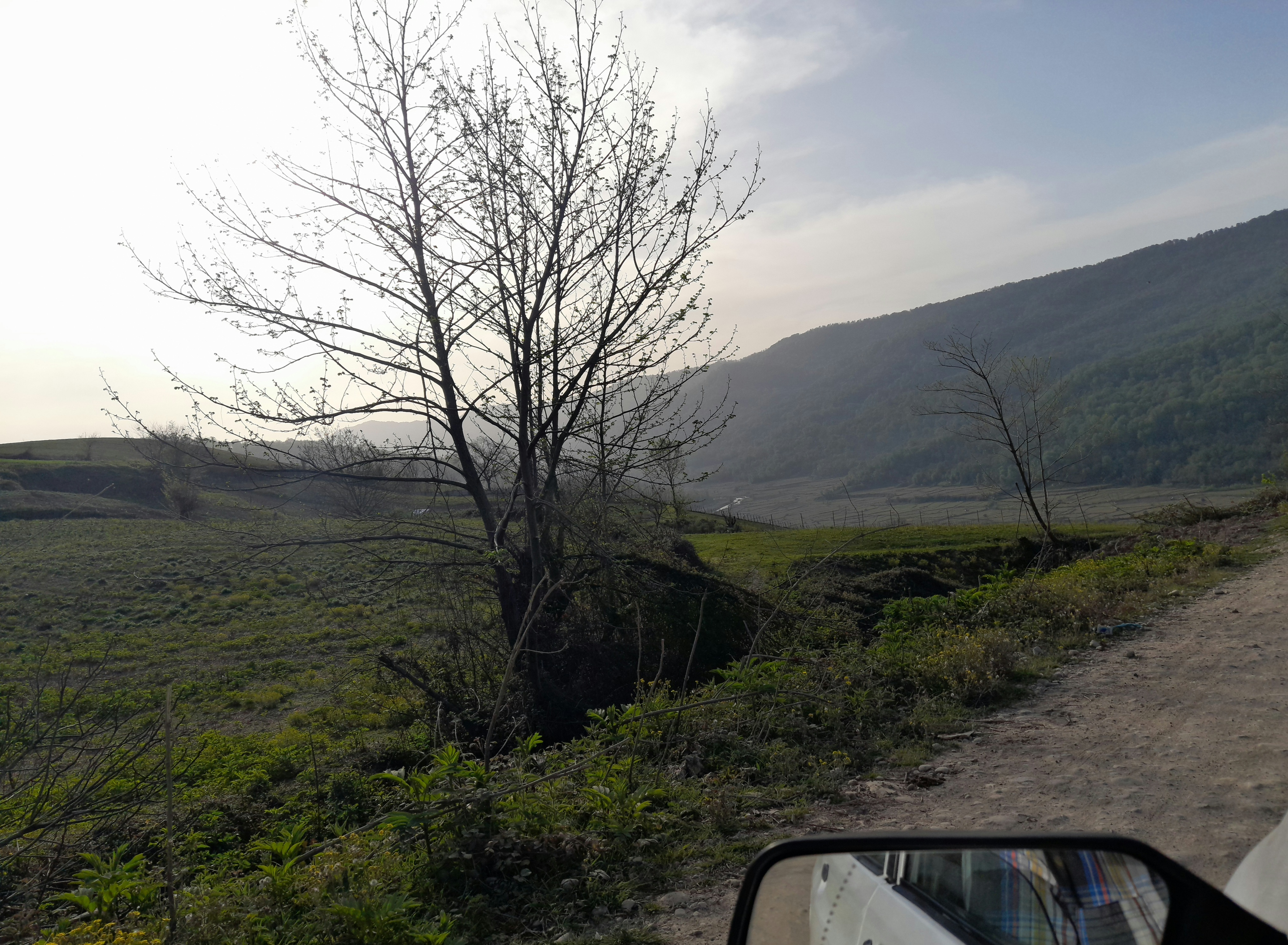

- Location within Iran
- Coordinates: 36°26′31″N 53°19′50″E
- Country: Iran
- Province: Mazandaran
- County: Miandorud
- Bakhsh: Central
- Rural District: Kuhdasht-e Gharbi

Population (2016)
  - Total: 46
- Time zone: UTC+3:30 (IRST)

Bazyar Kheyl (Persian: بازيارخيل, also Romanized as Bāzyār Kheyl; also known as Bāzār Kheyl and Bāzbār Kheyl) is a village in Kuhdasht-e Gharbi Rural District, in the Central District of Miandorud County, Mazandaran Province, Iran. At the 2006 census, its population was 46 in 16 families. Decreased from 80 people in 2006.
