= Zeyt =

Zeyt (Persian: زيت) may refer to:

- Zeyt, Azerbaijan
- Zeyt-e Olya, Iran
- Zeyt-e Sofla, Iran
