= Sarta, Iran =

Sarta سرتا
- Village
- Location within Iran
- Coordinates: 36°26′55″N 53°19′24″E
- Country: Iran
- Province: Mazandaran
- County: Miandorud
- Bakhsh: Central
- Rural District: Kuhdasht-e Gharbi

Population (2006)
  - Total: 68
- Time zone: UTC+3:30 (IRST)

Sarta (Persian: سرتا, also Romanized as Sartā) is a village in Kuhdasht-e Gharbi Rural District, in the Central District of Miandorud County, Mazandaran Province, Iran. At the 2016 census, its population was 44, in 20 families. Down from 68 people in 2006.
