= Jenasem =

Jenasem جناسم
- Village
- Location within Iran
- Coordinates: 36°26′12″N 53°21′39″E
- Country: Iran
- Province: Mazandaran
- County: Miandorud
- Bakhsh: Central
- Rural District: Kuhdasht-e Gharbi

Population (2006)
  - Total: 133
- Time zone: UTC+3:30 (IRST)

Jenasem (Persian: جناسم, also Romanized as Jenāsem; also known as Jenāsām) is a village in Kuhdasht-e Gharbi Rural District, in the Central District of Miandorud County, Mazandaran Province, Iran. At the 2016 census, its population was 80, in 31 families. Down from 133 people in 2006.
