= Asiab Sar =

Asiab Sar or As Yab Sar (Persian: اسياب سر) may refer to various places in Iran:

- Asiab Sar, Siahkal, Gilan Province
- Asiab Sar, Sowme'eh Sara, Gilan Province
- Asiab Sar, Behshahr, Mazandaran Province
- Asiab Sar, Miandorud, Mazandaran Province
- Asiab Sar, Qaem Shahr, Mazandaran Province
- Asiab Sar, Ramsar, Mazandaran Province
- Asiab Sar, Sari, Mazandaran Province
