= Miandorud =

Miandorud (Persian: میان‌دورود) may refer to:

- Miandorud County
- Miandorud-e Bozorg Rural District
- Miandorud-e Kuchak Rural District
