= Varmi, Iran =

Varmi وارمي
- Village
- Location within Iran
- Coordinates: 36°27′10″N 53°23′15″E
- Country: Iran
- Province: Mazandaran
- County: Miandorud
- Bakhsh: Central
- Rural District: Kuhdasht-e Gharbi

Population (2016)
  - Total: 85
- Time zone: UTC+3:30 (IRST)

Varmi (Persian: وارمي, also Romanized as Vārmī) is a village in Kuhdasht-e Gharbi Rural District, in the Central District of Miandorud County, Mazandaran Province, Iran. As of the 2016 census, its population was 85, in 31 families, a decrease from 141 people in 2006.
