= Musa Kola, Miandorud =

Musa Kola موسي كلا
- Village
- Location within Iran
- Coordinates: 36°26′32″N 53°18′49″E
- Country: Iran
- Province: Mazandaran
- County: Miandorud
- Bakhsh: Central
- Rural District: Kuhdasht-e Gharbi

Population (2016)
  - Total: 23
- Time zone: UTC+3:30 (IRST)

Musa Kola (Persian: موسي كلا, also Romanized as Mūsá Kolā) is a village in Kuhdasht-e Gharbi Rural District, in the Central District of Miandorud County, Mazandaran Province, Iran. At the 2016 census, its population was 23, in 13 families. Increased from 13 people in 2006.
