= Musa Kola =

Musa Kola (Persian: موسي كلا) may refer to:

- Musa Kola, Miandorud
- Musa Kola, Simorgh
