= Surben =

Surben or Sur Bon (Persian: سوربن) may refer to:

- Surben, Babol
- Sur Bon, Miandorud
