= Kuhdasht-e Gharbi Rural District =

Rural district in Mazandaran province, Iran

Kuhdasht-e Gharbi Rural District Persian: دهستان كوهدشت غربي
- Rural District
- Location within Iran
- Coordinates: 36°30′N 53°16′E
- Country: Iran
- Province: Mazandaran
- County: Miandorud
- District: Central
- Established: 2010
- Capital: Darab Kola

Population (2016)
  - Total: 11,257
- Time zone: UTC+3:30 (IRST)

Kuhdasht-e Gharbi Rural District (Persian: دهستان كوهدشت غربي) is in the Central District of Miandorud County, Mazandaran province, Iran. Its capital is the village of Darab Kola.

== History ==
In 2010, Miandorud District was separated from Sari County in the establishment of Miandorud County, and Kuhdasht-e Gharbi Rural District was created in the new Central District.

== Demographics ==
=== Population ===
At the time of the 2011 National Census, the rural district's population was 10,814 inhabitants in 3,192 households. The 2016 census measured the population of the rural district as 11,257 in 3,665 households. The most populous of its 17 villages was Darab Kola, with 5,262 people.

=== Other villages in the rural district ===
- Anjil Nesam
- Badeleh
- Bazyar Kheyl
- Jenasem
- Kia Pey
- Lalim
- Morsam
- Musa Kola
- Owsa
- Saneh Kuh
- Sarta
- Varmi

Townships:

- Mojtame-ye Meskuni Neka Chub
- Mojtame-ye Meskuni Siman
