= Goharbaran-e Jonubi Rural District =

Rural district in Mazandaran province, Iran

Goharbaran-e Jonubi Rural District Persian: دهستان گهرباران جنوبي
- Rural District
- Location within Iran
- Coordinates: 36°46′N 53°12′E
- Country: Iran
- Province: Mazandaran
- County: Miandorud
- District: Goharbaran
- Established: 2010
- Capital: Makran

Population (2016)
  - Total: 5,689
- Time zone: UTC+3:30 (IRST)

Goharbaran-e Jonubi Rural District (Persian: دهستان گهرباران جنوبي) is in Goharbaran District of Miandorud County, Mazandaran province, Iran. Its capital is the village of Makran.

== History ==
In 2010, Miandorud District was separated from Sari County in the establishment of Miandorud County, and Goharbaran-e Jonubi Rural District was created in the new Goharbaran District.

== Demographics ==
=== Population ===
At the time of the 2011 National Census, the rural district's population was 6,003 inhabitants in 1,808 households. The 2016 census measured the population of the rural district as 5,689 in 1,933 households. The most populous of its 12 villages was Makran, with 1,498 people.

=== Other villages in the rural district ===
- Abbasabad-e Holum Sar
- Asiab Sar
- Bezaminabad
- Qajar Kheyl-e Khurandi
- Qandar Kheyl
- Siah Chenar
- Sur Bon
- Var Kola
- Varandan
