= Goharbaran-e Shomali Rural District =

Rural district in Mazandaran province, Iran

Goharbaran-e Shomali Rural District Persian: دهستان گهرباران شمالي
- Rural District
- Location within Iran
- Coordinates: 36°45′N 53°12′E
- Country: Iran
- Province: Mazandaran
- County: Miandorud
- District: Goharbaran
- Established: 2010
- Capital: Tabaqdeh

Population (2016)
  - Total: 9,061
- Time zone: UTC+3:30 (IRST)

Goharbaran-e Shomali Rural District (Persian: دهستان گهرباران شمالي) is in Goharbaran District of Miandorud County, Mazandaran province, Iran. It is administered from the city of Tabaqdeh.

== History ==
In 2010, Miandorud District was separated from Sari County in the establishment of Miandorud County, and Goharbaran-e Shomali Rural District was created in the new Goharbaran District.

== Demographics ==
=== Population ===
At the time of the 2011 National Census, the rural district's population was 9,760 inhabitants in 2,997 households. The 2016 census measured the population of the rural district as 9,061 in 3,096 households. The most populous of its 13 villages was Tabaqdeh (now a city), with 2,023 people.

=== Other villages in the rural district ===
- Anar Din
- Bargeh
- Chamaz Tappeh
- Dolmarz
- Ezzat ol Din
- Hasanabad
- Tajan Lateh-ye Olya
- Tajan Lateh-ye Sofla
- Tazehabad-e Sepah
- Valuja
