= Surak, Iran =

City in Mazandaran province, Iran

Surak Persian: سورک
- City
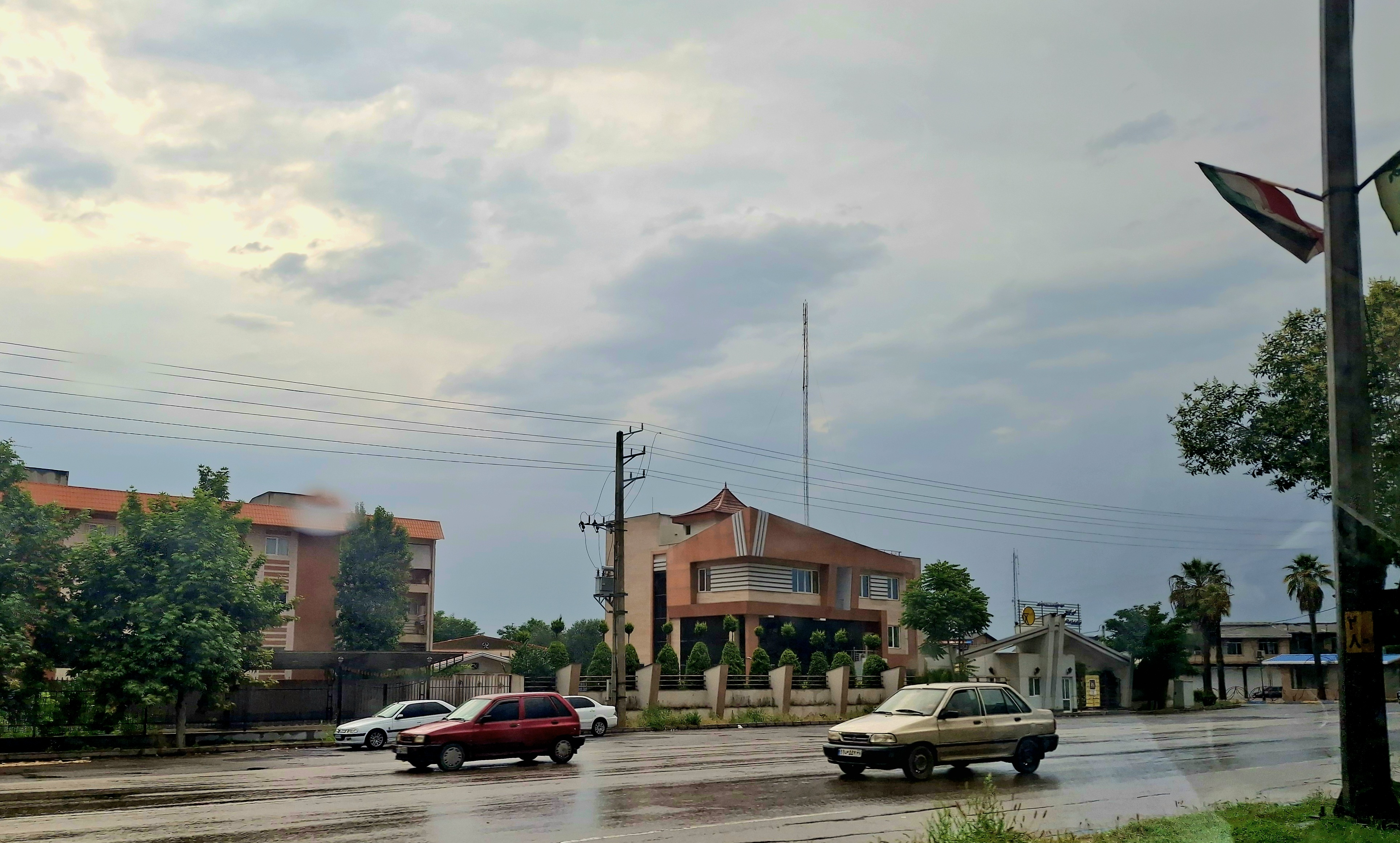
- The city of Surak after rain

- Location within Iran
- Coordinates: 36°35′38″N 53°12′31″E
- Country: Iran
- Province: Mazandaran
- County: Miandorud
- District: Central
- Established as a city: 1996

Population (2016)
  - Total: 9,208
- Time zone: UTC+3:30 (IRST)

Surak (Persian: سورک (Note: Also romanized as Sūrak; formerly the village of Sara (صرا)) is a city in the Central District of Miandorud County, Mazandaran province, Iran, serving as capital of both the county and the district. As a village, it was the capital of Kuhdasht Rural District (Note: Renamed Kuhdasht-e Sharqi Rural District) until its capital was transferred to the village of Jam Khaneh.

Surak is 12 kilometres (7.5 mi) east of Sari, on the road connecting Sari in the west to Neka in the east. Surak is south of the Caspian Sea and north of the northern slopes of the Alborz Mountains. The village of Surak was converted to a city in 1996.

== Demographics ==
=== Population ===
At the time of the 2006 National Census, the city's population was 8,817 in 2,377 households, when it was capital of the former Miandorud District in Sari County. The following census in 2011 counted 8,930 people in 2,712 households, by which time the district had been separated from the county in the establishment of Miandorud County. Surak was transferred to the new Central District as the county's capital. The 2016 census measured the population of the city as 9,208 people in 4,087 households.

== Economy ==
Agricultural products include rice, citrus and tobacco.
