= Asiab Sar, Qaem Shahr =

Asiab Sar آسيابسر
- Village
- Location within Iran
- Coordinates: 36°30′20″N 52°47′35″E
- Country: Iran
- Province: Mazandaran
- County: Qaem Shahr
- Bakhsh: Central
- Rural District: Balatajan

Population (2016)
  - Total: 268
- Time zone: UTC+3:30 (IRST)

Asiab Sar (Persian: آسيابسر, also Romanized as Āsīāb Sar and Ās Yāb Sar) is a village in Balatajan Rural District, in the Central District of Qaem Shahr County, Mazandaran Province, Iran.

At the time of the 2006 National Census, the village's population was 281 in 74 households. The following census in 2011 counted 256 people in 72 households. The 2016 census measured the population of the village as 268 people in 90 households.
