= Kuhdasht-e Sharqi Rural District =

Rural district in Mazandaran province, Iran

Kuhdasht-e Sharqi Rural District Persian: دهستان كوهدشت شرق
- Rural District
- Location within Iran
- Coordinates: 36°34′N 53°17′E
- Country: Iran
- Province: Mazandaran
- County: Miandorud
- District: Central
- Established: 1990
- Capital: Jam Khaneh

Population (2016)
  - Total: 10,236
- Time zone: UTC+3:30 (IRST)

Kuhdasht-e Sharqi Rural District (Persian: دهستان كوهدشت شرق), (Note: Formerly Kuhdasht Rural District (دهستان كوهدشت)) is in the Central District of Miandorud County, Mazandaran province, Iran. Its capital is the village of Jam Khaneh. The previous capital of the rural district was the village of Surak, now a city.

== Demographics ==
=== Population ===
At the time of the 2006 National Census, the rural district's population (as Kuhdasht Rural District of the former Miandorud District in Sari County) was 20,601 in 5,213 households. There were 10,563 in 3,109 households at the following census of 2011, by which time the district had been separated from the county in the establishment of Miandorud County. The rural district was transferred to the new Central District and renamed Kuhdasht-e Sharqi Rural District. The 2016 census measured the population of the rural district as 10,236 in 3,313 households. The most populous of its four villages was Jam Khaneh, with 5,173 people.

=== Other villages in the rural district ===
- Asram
- Pileh Kuh
- Safarabad
