= Goharbaran District =

District in Mazandaran province, Iran

Goharbaran District Persian: بخش گهرباران
- District
- Location within Iran
- Coordinates: 36°45′N 53°12′E
- Country: Iran
- Province: Mazandaran
- County: Miandorud
- Established: 2010
- Capital: Tabaqdeh

Population (2016)
  - Total: 14,750
- Time zone: UTC+3:30 (IRST)

Goharbaran District (Persian: بخش گهرباران) is in Miandorud County, Mazandaran province, Iran. Its capital is the city of Tabaqdeh.

== History ==
In 2010, Miandorud District was separated from Sari County in the establishment of Miandorud County, which was divided into two districts and five rural districts, with Surak as its capital and only city at the time. The village of Tabaqdeh was converted to a city in 2020.

== Demographics ==
=== Population ===
At the time of the 2011 National Census, the district's population was 15,763 people in 4,805 households. The 2016 census measured the population of the district as 14,750 inhabitants in 5,029 households.

=== Administrative divisions ===
Goharbaran District Population
Administrative Divisions	2011	2016
Goharbaran-e Jonubi RD	6,003	5,689
Goharbaran-e Shomali RD	9,760	9,061
Tabaqdeh (city) (Note: Became a city after the 2016 census)		
Total	15,763	14,750
RD = Rural District
