= Miandorud-e Bozorg Rural District =

Rural district in Mazandaran province, Iran

Miandorud-e Bozorg Rural District Persian: دهستان ميان دورود بزرگ
- Rural District
- Location within Iran
- Coordinates: 36°38′N 53°12′E
- Country: Iran
- Province: Mazandaran
- County: Miandorud
- District: Central
- Established: 1987
- Capital: Eslamabad

Population (2016)
  - Total: 9,602
- Time zone: UTC+3:30 (IRST)

Miandorud-e Bozorg Rural District (Persian: دهستان ميان دورود بزرگ) is in the Central District of Miandorud County, Mazandaran province, Iran. Its capital is the village of Eslamabad.

== Demographics ==
=== Population ===
At the time of the 2006 National Census, the rural district's population (as a part of the former Miandorud District in Sari County) was 24,444 in 6,634 households. There were 9,706 inhabitants in 2,859 households at the following census of 2011, by which time the district had been separated from the county in the establishment of Miandorud County. The rural district was transferred to the new Central District. The 2016 census measured the population of the rural district as 9,602 in 3,159 households. The most populous of its 13 villages was Eslamabad, with 3,997 people.

=== Other villages in the rural district ===
- Bisheh Sar
- Dasht-e Naz Airport
- Mohammadabad
- Palang Azad
- Shahriar Kandeh
- Sherkat-e Neka Chub
- Zari Mahalleh
- Zeyt-e Olya
- Zeyt-e Sofla
