= Central District (Miandorud County) =

District in Mazandaran province, Iran

Central District (Miandorud County) Persian: بخش مرکزی شهرستان میان‌دورود
- District
- Location within Iran
- Coordinates: 36°32′N 53°17′E
- Country: Iran
- Province: Mazandaran
- County: Miandorud
- Established: 2010
- Capital: Surak

Population (2016)
  - Total: 40,303
- Time zone: UTC+3:30 (IRST)

The Central District of Miandorud County (Persian: بخش مرکزی شهرستان میان‌دورود) is in Mazandaran province, Iran. Its capital is the city of Surak.

== History ==
In 2010, Miandorud District was separated from Sari County in the establishment of Miandorud County, which was divided into two districts and five rural districts, with Surak as its capital and only city at the time.

== Demographics ==
=== Population ===
At the time of the 2011 National Census, the district's population was 40,013 people in 11,872 households. The 2016 census measured the population of the district as 40,303 inhabitants in 13,224 households.

=== Administrative divisions ===
Central District (Miandorud County) Population
Administrative Divisions	2011	2016
Kuhdasht-e Gharbi RD	10,814	11,257
Kuhdasht-e Sharqi RD (Note: Formerly Kuhdasht Rural District)	10,563	10,236
Miandorud-e Bozorg RD	9,706	9,602
Surak (city) (Note: Formerly the village of Sara)	8,930	9,208
Total	40,013	40,303
RD = Rural District
