= Miandorud District =

Former district in Mazandaran province, Iran

Miandorud District Persian: بخش میاندورود
- Former District
- Location within Iran
- Coordinates: 36°37′N 53°13′E
- Country: Iran
- Province: Mazandaran
- County: Sari
- Capital: Surak

Population (2006)
  - Total: 53,862
- Time zone: UTC+3:30 (IRST)

Miandorud District (Persian: بخش میاندورود) is a former administrative division of Sari County, Mazandaran province, Iran. Its capital was the city of Surak.

== History ==
In 2010, the district was separated from the county in the establishment of Miandorud County.

== Demographics ==
=== Population ===
At the time of the 2006 National Census, the district's population was 53,862 in 14,224 households.

=== Administrative divisions ===
Miandorud District Population
Administrative Divisions	2006
Kuhdasht RD (Note: Renamed Kuhdasht-e Sharqi Rural District)	20,601
Miandorud-e Bozorg RD	24,444
Surak (city)	8,817
Total	53,862
RD = Rural District
