= Miandorud County =

County in Mazandaran province, Iran

Miandorud County Persian: شهرستان میان‌دورود
- County
- Location of Miandorud County in Mazandaran province (right, pink)

- Location of Mazandaran province in Iran
- Coordinates: 36°37′N 53°13′E
- Country: Iran
- Province: Mazandaran
- Established: 2010
- Capital: Surak
- Districts: Central, Goharbaran

Population (2016)
  - Total: 55,053
- Time zone: UTC+3:30 (IRST)

Miandorud County (Persian: شهرستان میان‌دورود) is in Mazandaran province, Iran. Its capital is the city of Surak.

== History ==
In 2010, Miandorud District was separated from Sari County in the establishment of Miandorud County, which was divided into two districts and five rural districts, with Surak as its capital and only city at the time. The village of Tabaqdeh was converted to a city in 2020.

== Demographics ==
=== Population ===
At the time of the 2011 National Census, the county's population was 55,776 people in 16,670 households. The 2016 census measured the population of the county as 55,053 in 18,253 households.

=== Administrative divisions ===
Miandorud County's population history and administrative structure over two consecutive censuses are shown in the following table.

Miandorud County Population
Administrative Divisions	2011	2016
Central District	40,013	40,303
Kuhdasht-e Gharbi RD	10,814	11,257
Kuhdasht-e Sharqi RD (Note: Formerly Kuhdasht Rural District)	10,563	10,236
Miandorud-e Bozorg RD	9,706	9,602
Surak (city) (Note: Formerly the village of Sara)	8,930	9,208
Goharbaran District	15,763	14,750
Goharbaran-e Jonubi RD	6,003	5,689
Goharbaran-e Shomali RD	9,760	9,061
Tabaqdeh (city) (Note: Became a city after the 2016 census)		
Total	55,776	55,053
RD = Rural District

== See also ==
Media related to Miandorud County at Wikimedia Commons
