= Valuyeh =

Valuyeh or Veluyeh or Voluyeh (Persian: ولويه) may refer to:

- Valuyeh-ye Olya
- Valuyeh-ye Sofla
