= Ivel =

Ivel may refer to:

== Places ==
- Ivel, Iran, a village in Mazandaran Province
- Ivel, Kentucky, an unincorporated community
- River Ivel, a river in the east of England

== Other ==
- Ivel Z3, an Apple IIe compatible computer
- Ivel Ultra, an Apple II compatible computer
- St Ivel, a brand of dairy products in the United Kingdom
- St. Ivel International, an annual international figure skating competition in Great Britain
- Ivel Agricultural Motors Limited, a British company producing tractors and other vehicles from 1902 to 1920
