= Hierve el Agua =

Waterfall in Mexican state of Oaxaca

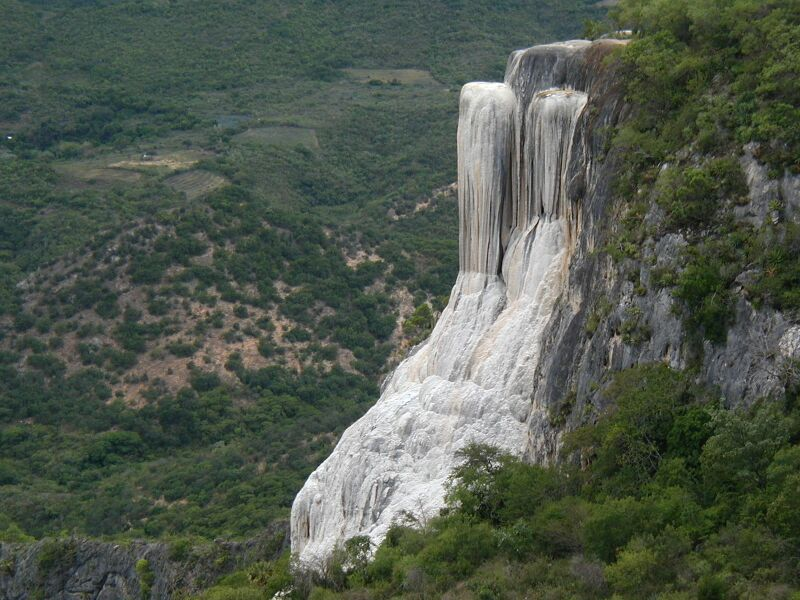
- The large "waterfall" at Hierve el Agua

- Location within Mexico
- Interactive map of Hierve el Agua
- Location: San Lorenzo Albarradas, Oaxaca, Mexico
- Coordinates: 16°51′56″N 96°16′34″W

Hierve el Agua (Spanish for "the water boils") is a set of natural travertine rock formations in San Lorenzo Albarradas, Oaxaca, Mexico that resemble cascades of water. The site is located about 70 km east of Oaxaca City, and consists of two rock shelves or cliffs which rise between fifty and ninety metres from the valley below, from which extend nearly white rock formations which look like waterfalls. These formations are created by fresh water springs, whose water is over-saturated with calcium carbonate and other minerals. As the water trickles over the cliffs, the excess minerals are deposited, much in the same manner that stalactites are formed in caves. One of the cliffs, called the "cascada chica" (small waterfall) or the Amphitheatre, contains two large artificial pools for swimming as well as a number of small natural pools. One of the artificial pools is very near the edge of the cliff.

== Location ==
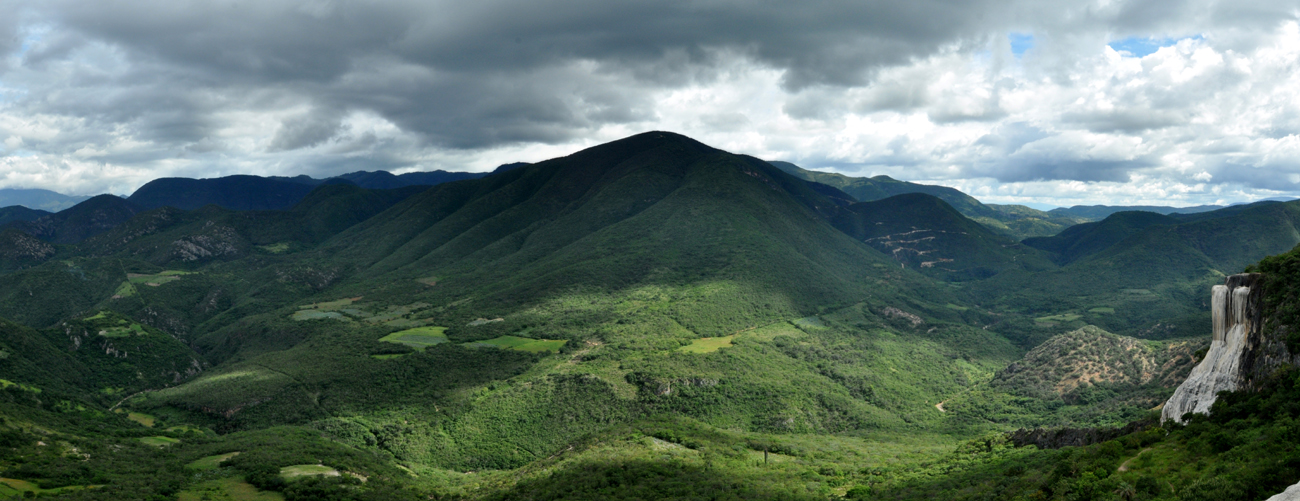
Panorama of the valley with the large "waterfall"

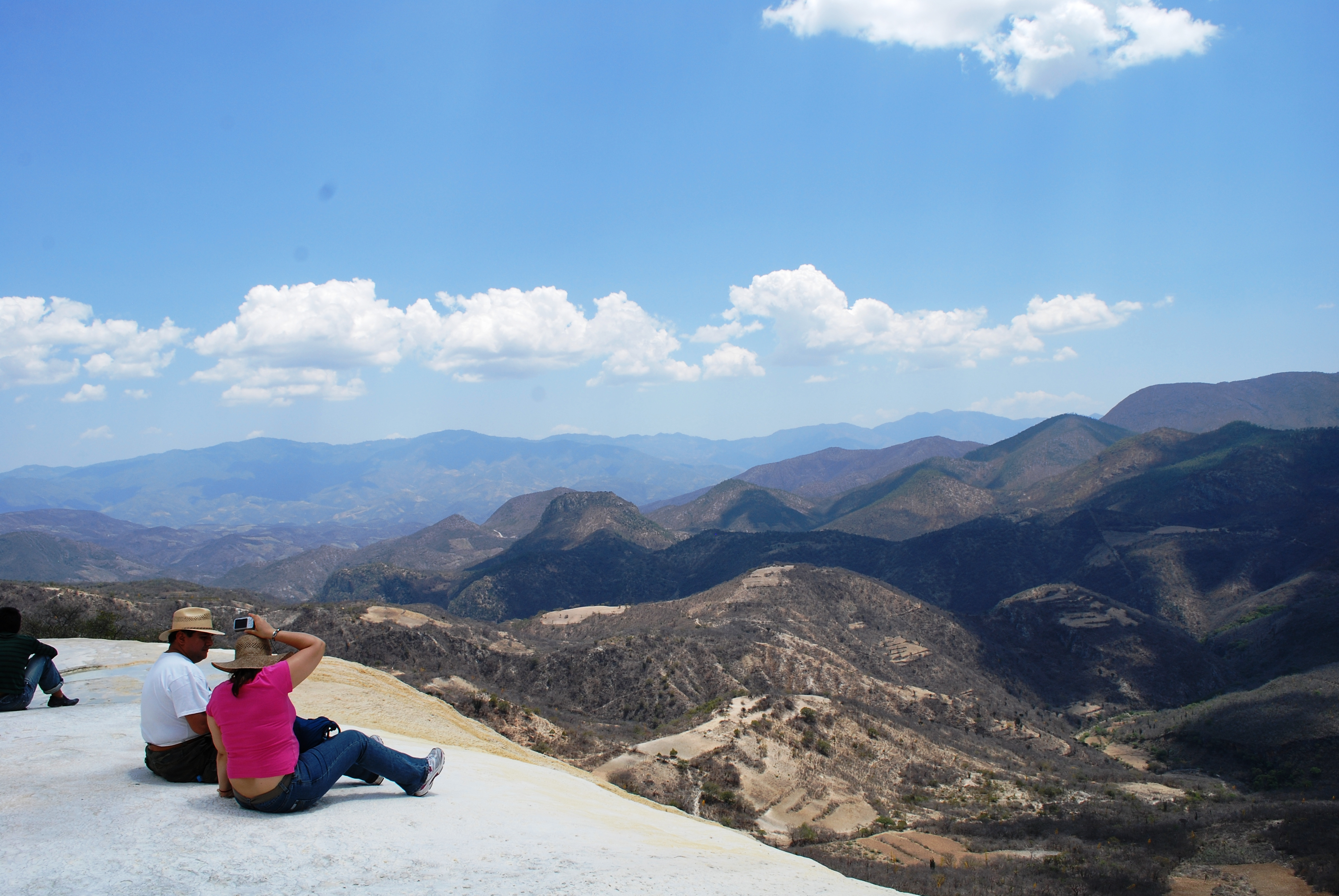
Looking out over the valley

The site is located in a very isolated region with rough terrain, dominated principally by holm oak forest, cactus and other semi desert vegetation. The "waterfalls" or rock formations are on cliffs of mountains that rise abruptly from the narrow valley floor below. It is located in ethnic Mixe territory, with the two closest communities being San Lorenzo Albarradas and San Isidro Roaguia having populations of 1403 and 320, respectively (2005). The springs that produce the rock formations are one of the few water sources in the area.

== "Waterfall" rock formations and springs ==
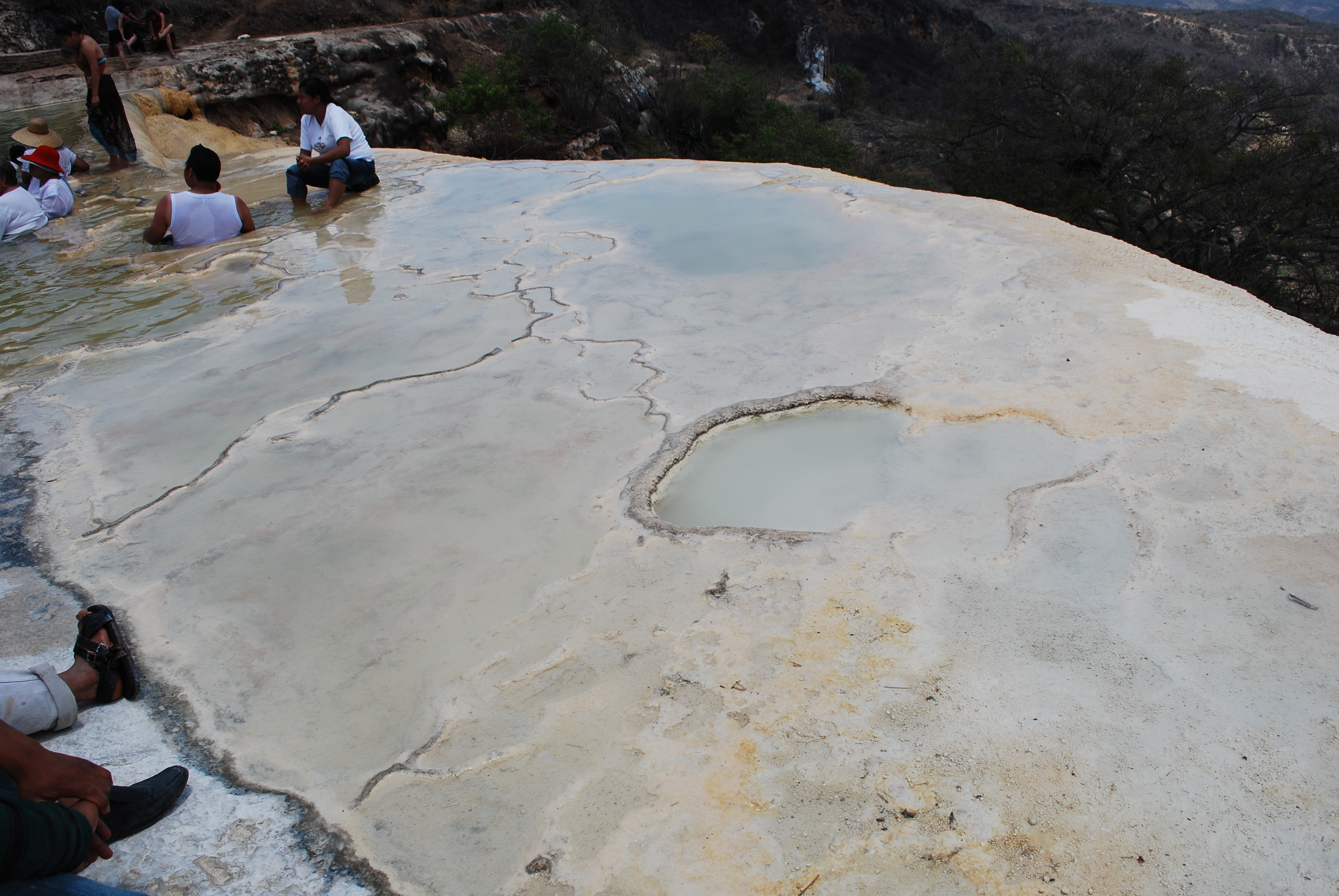
Rock formation as it "goes over" the cliff at the Amphitheater

The site consists of two waterfall-like rock formations which have been formed over thousands of years. Both cliffs rise over fifty meters from the valley floor, with one rock formation reaching down twelve metres and the other reaching down thirty metres. The twelve meter one is called "cascada chica" (small waterfall) and "flows" off a base which is about sixty metres wide. The other, "cascada grande" (large waterfall), extends down from a base with which is about ninety metres wide and eighty metres above the valley floor.

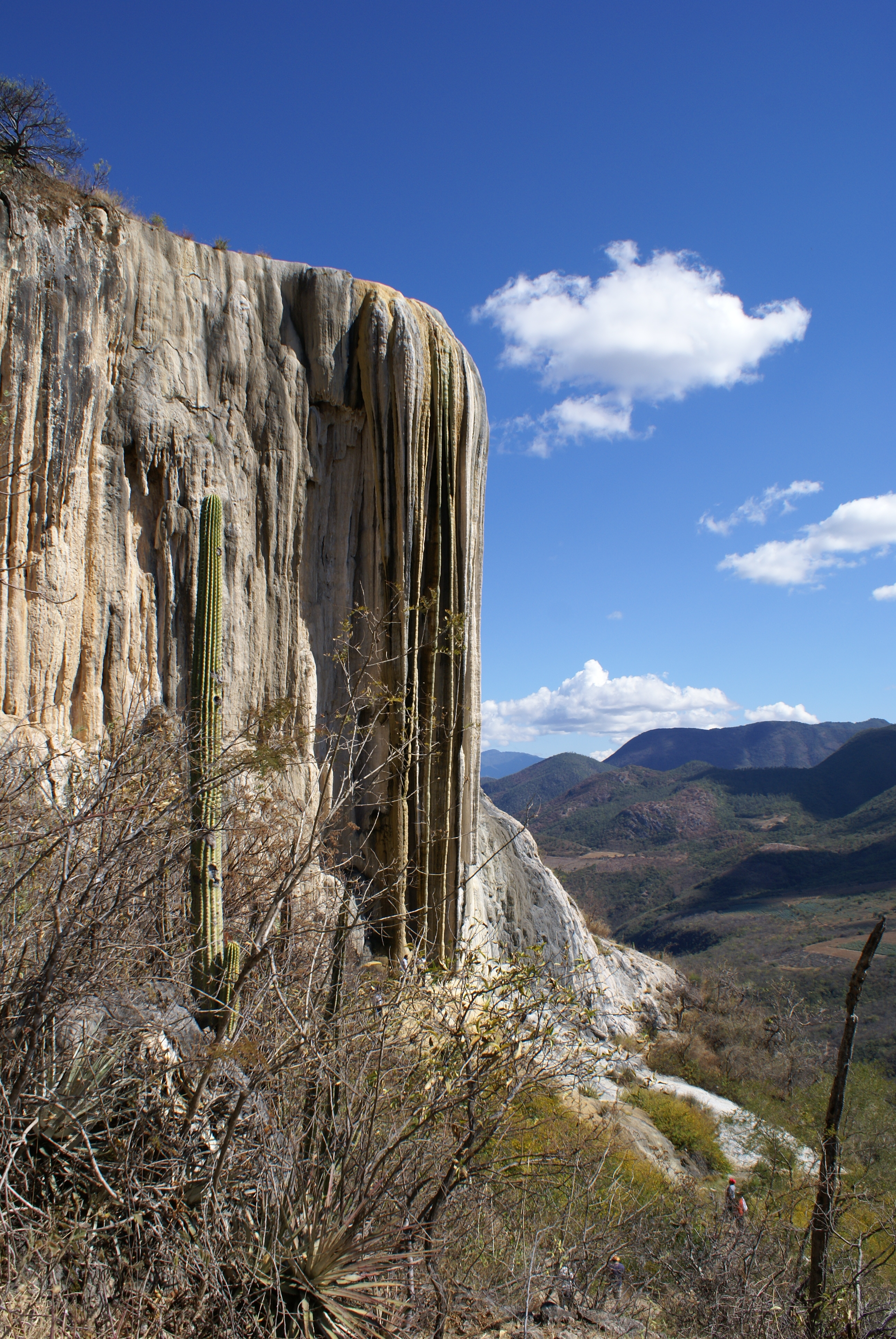
Rock formations of Hierve el Agua from the west and landscape

The rock formations are often described as "cascadas de sal" (salt waterfalls), "cascadas petrificadas" (petrified waterfalls) and "cascadas pétreas" (rock waterfalls). The falls are formed by relatively small amounts of water which is oversaturated with calcium carbonate and comes to the surface through cracks or fissures on the mountainside. The water has a temperature of 22 to 27 °C (72 to 81 °F). As the water runs down the rock face, it forms large stalactites similar to those found in caves. The flow of water from the spring varies significantly between the dry and rainy seasons. 95% of the surface rock formations are of calcium carbonate; however, lower layers of both rock and water currents are little known as they are sealed by the above layers. The calcium carbonate gives the formations a white or near white appearance, but other minerals that can be present in the water, such as silver, barium and iron can also be found and determines the color of a particular stalactite. The calcium carbonate in the water is due to rainwater which passes underground. First it absorbs carbon dioxide, and forms molecules of carbonic acid. This acid comes into contact with underground marble and partially dissolves creating calcium bicarbonate. When the water runs above ground, the excess minerals fall out.

The waters, with their high mineral content, are reputed to have healing qualities.

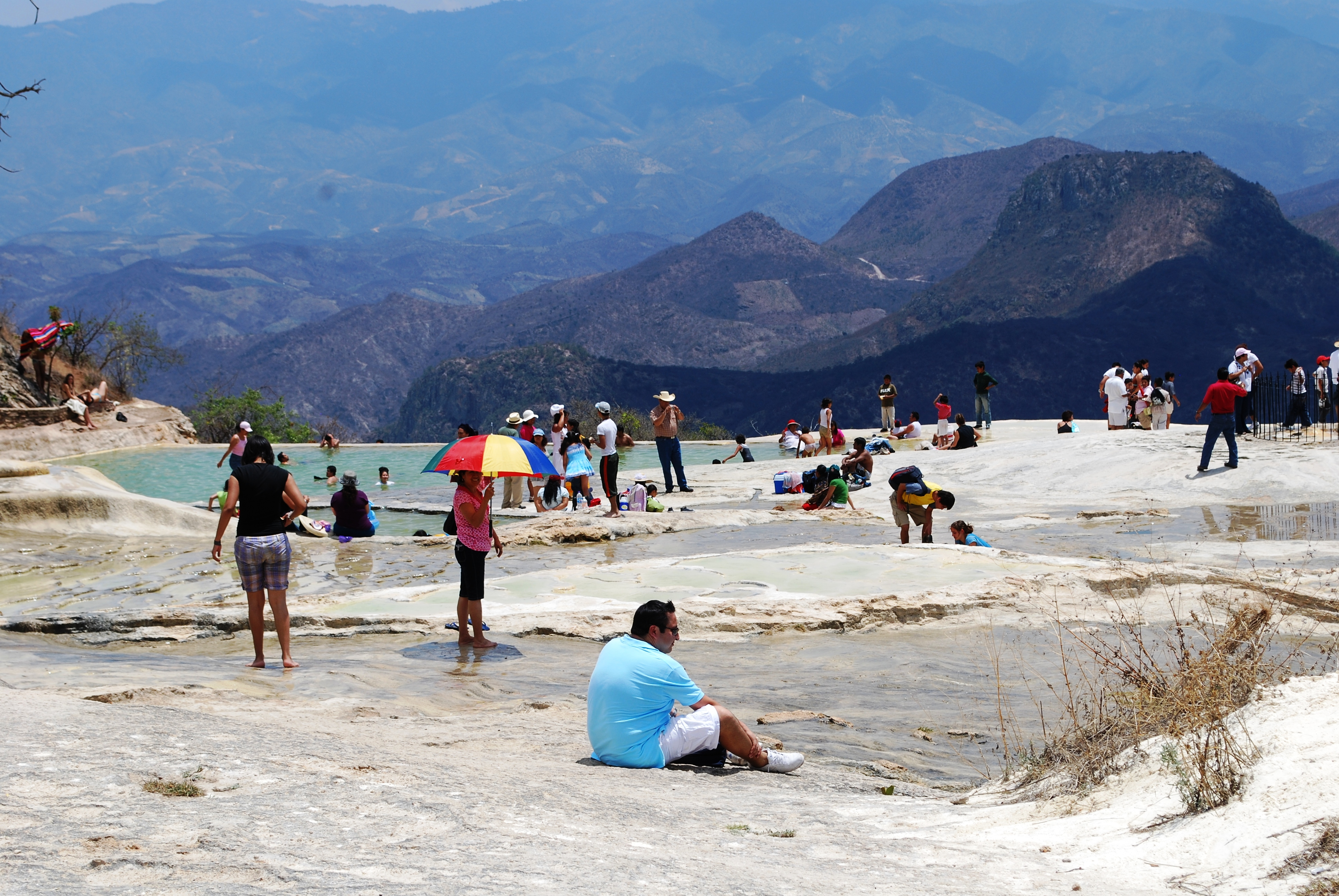
Natural and lower artificial pool

The more easily accessible and more often visited of the two waterfalls is the "cascada chica," also called the Amphitheatre. This cliff rises over fifty metres above the valley floor, where there is a natural platform about sixty meters wide. This platform has four springs. The water from three of the four springs is captured by a number of small natural pools and two large artificial pools in which visitors can swim. The lower of the two pools is very close to the cliff edge and was built in 2007. In these pools, the water appears a turquoise green due to the mineral concentration. The fourth spring is located closest to the edge and responsible for most of the waterfall rock formation. Two of the four springs on the Amphitheatre side rise from the level floor and appear to bubble up, which is the source of the name. The bubbling action of these and some other springs is thought to occur due to construction of underground water currents. This bubbling action leads to the name of the area, Hierve el Agua (the water boils). Water constantly flows out of the springs and the process of depositing the calcium carbonate is ongoing, which can be seen on the walls of the artificial pools.

Trails lead from the cascada chica to the cascada grande, the valley floor and other areas in the vicinity. The cascada grande is just to the south of the cascada chica and easily visible from it. This waterfall rock formation is more vertical than the cascada chica. Similarly, it is a rock shelf from which flows mineral laden water over the side. This shelf is ninety metres above the valley floor, eighty metres wide with the waterfall extending down for about thirty metres. This shelf does not have artificial pools.

== Ancient canals ==
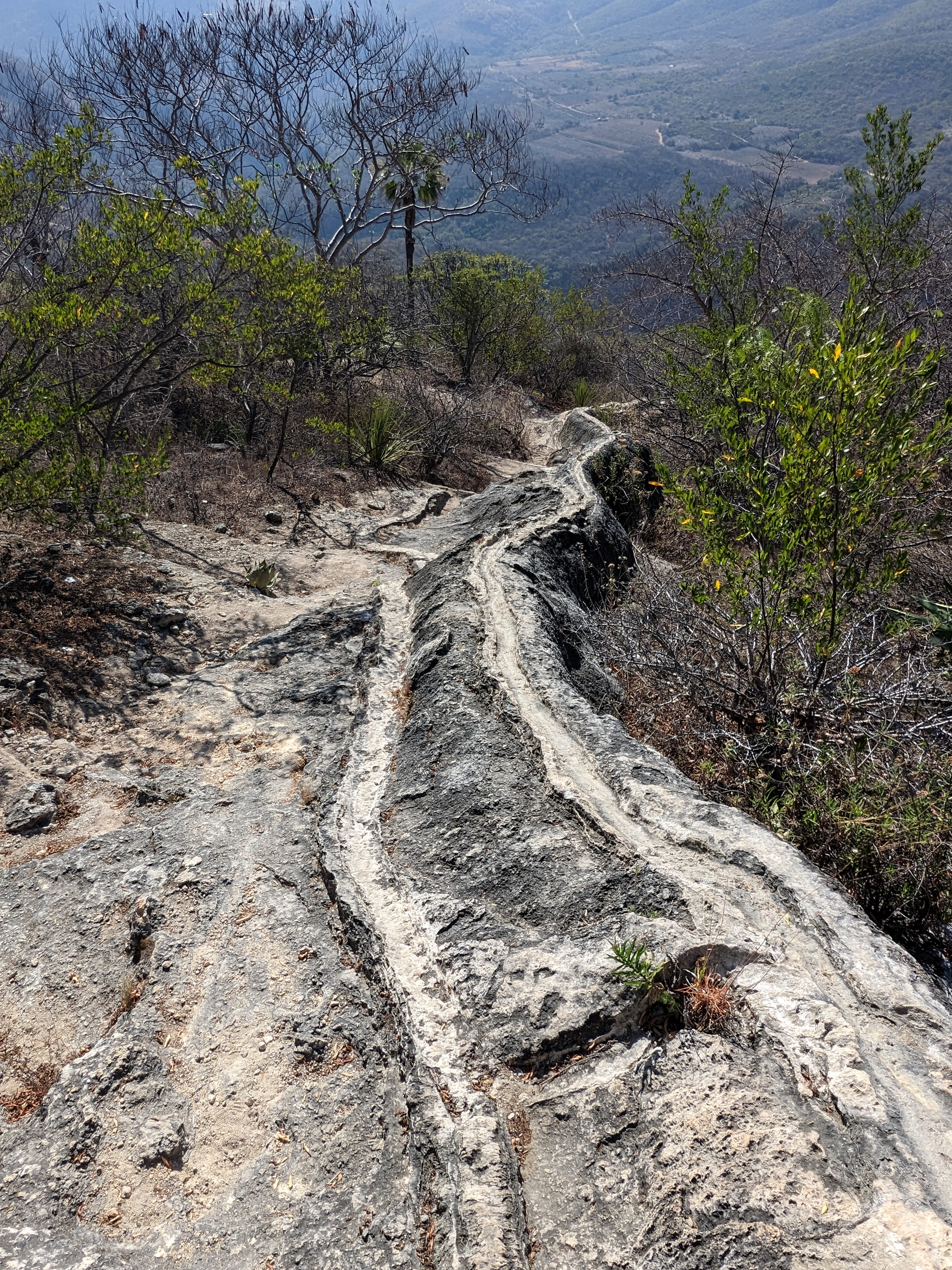
An example of the ancient irrigation canals

The area is also of archeological interest because of the extensive system of irrigation and terraces built by the Zapotecs as many as 2,500 years ago. It was also most likely a sacred site to the ancient peoples of the Oaxaca valley. The canals are part of an irrigation system which was created more than 2,500 years ago, most of which extend from the Amphitheatre side. Researchers have studied the terraces and canals which have been cut into the sides of the mountains these cliffs are on and have concluded that they were an irrigation system, unique in Mexico. Only vestiges of these irrigation canals remain; however, the archeological area has not been completely explored. These irrigation canals are considered to be unique in Mesoamerica, not only because irrigation was not common in pre-Hispanic Mexico but because they are the only example of lined irrigation canals. It is not known why canal lining does not appear outside of the Hierve el Agua area, and here the lining develops naturally. While seepage and bank erosion were indeed problems with irrigation farming in other parts of Mesoamerica, the nearest example of anything similar is with the Hohokam of southern Arizona in 650 C.E.

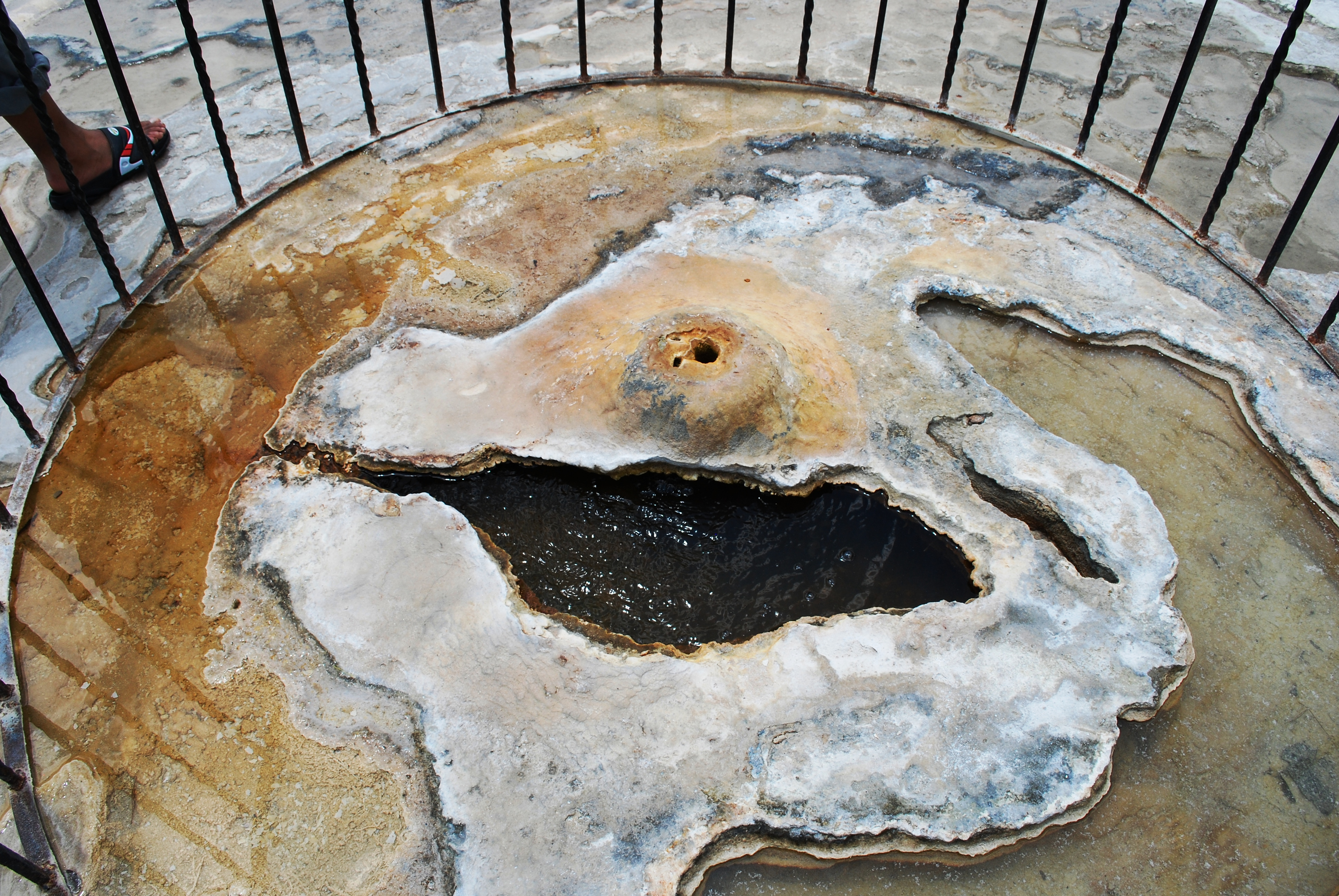
One of the springs that bubbles up

== The tourist attraction ==
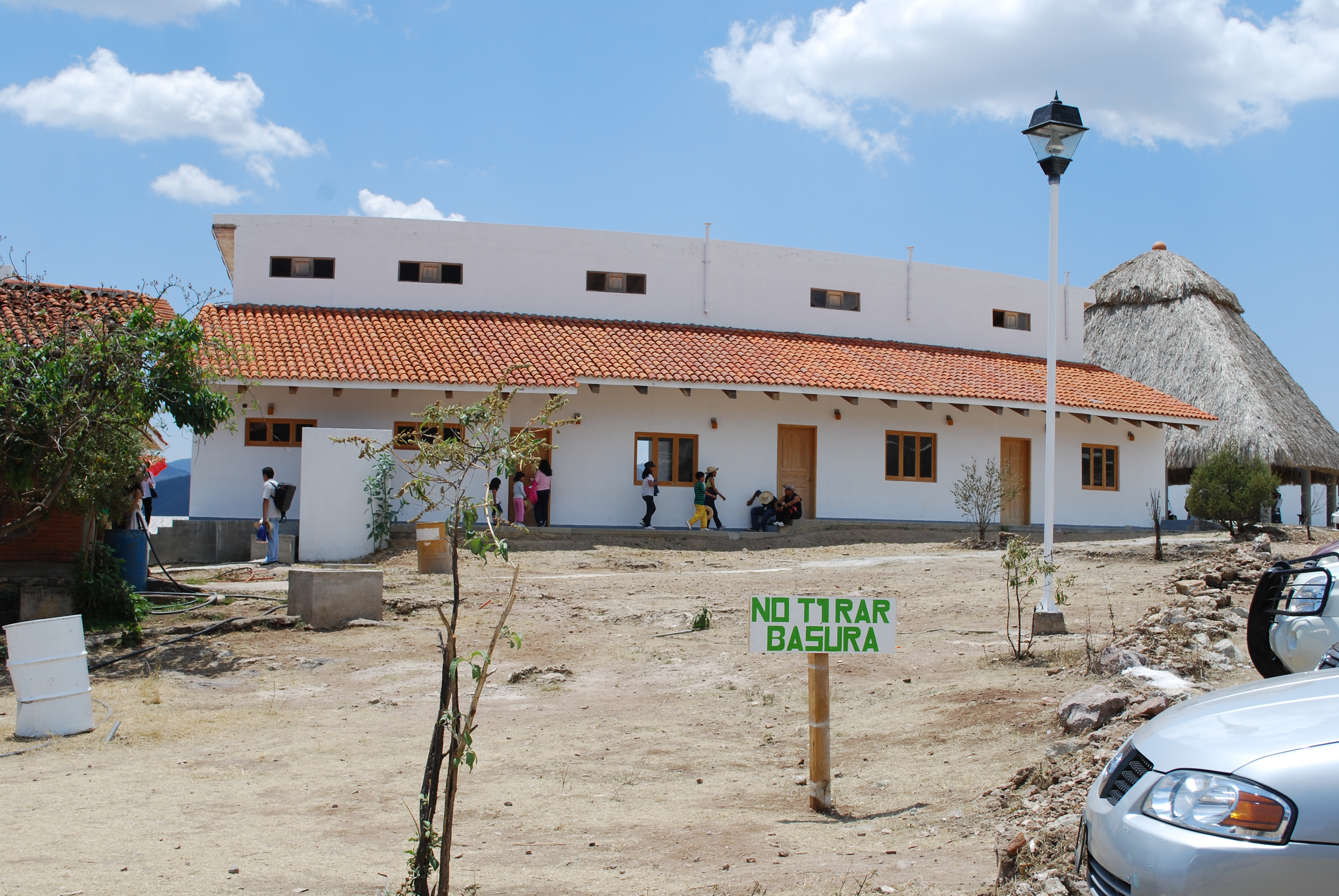
Part of Turis Yu'u

In addition to the artificial pools on the Amphitheatre side, a number of other services have been built for visitors such as food stands, small markets, cabins and a regular swimming pool. The cabin area, called "Turis Yu’u," with its pool was built in the 1990s and offer areas to change clothes, shower, eat in an open-air restaurant and for overnight stays although the accommodations are very basic. This complex, as well as many of the other stalls are owned by residents of the Roeguia community.

=== Site access ===
The roads leading in have been occasionally subject to blockades. Despite the development, the nearby communities of San Lorenza Albarradas and San Isidro Roaguia still suffer from poverty. Each visitor is charged between M$10.00 to M$60.00 pesos by the state of Oaxaca to enter the site, depending on the season. But disputes have arisen between the two nearby communities about who should administer it and about income sharing. This led to the closing of the site between 2005 and 2007. Promises by state officials were made to invest the money earned at the site to raising living standards in the area, but residents claim that this has never happened. As a result, the locals set up their own roadside checkpoints to levy a small fee, thus tourists are sometimes charged twice to access the site – once on the road and once at the entrance to the park.

In the state of Oaxaca, road closures and blockades has been a common form of protest. It has been suggested that this reflects a weakness in the state government, illustrating its inability to maintain order. In March 2014, travelers reported that blockade of the local road to Hierve el Agua had erupted again. In October 2019, residents of Tlacolula de Matamoros, a town roughly 30 km (~18 miles) away, blocked the Pan-American Highway (Federal Highway 190) leading to Hierve el Agua to call attention to a dispute about whether an elementary school damaged by earthquakes should be repaired or replaced. In April 2020, as the COVID-19 pandemic began to spread into Oaxaca, residents of San Lorenzo Albarradas blockaded the road over concerns that uncontrolled tourism would infect the locals. The ombudsman of Oaxaca, Bernardo Rodríguez Alamilla, said that municipalities cannot legally block access or impose traffic restrictions so the state tries to dissuade them. However, sometimes the state may give in to avoid conflicts, even sending in the National Guard to supervise their implementation.

== See also ==
- Badab-e Surt
- Bagni San Filippo
- Baishuitai
- Mammoth Hot Springs
- Pamukkale
- Pink and White Terraces
- Terme di Saturnia
- Huanglong Scenic and Historic Interest Area
