= Kalkenar =

Kalkenar كلكنار
- Village
- Location within Iran
- Coordinates: 36°13′42″N 53°41′38″E
- Country: Iran
- Province: Mazandaran
- County: Sari
- Bakhsh: Chahardangeh
- Rural District: Poshtkuh

Population (2016)
  - Total: 58
- Time zone: UTC+3:30 (IRST)

Kalkenar (Persian: كلكنار, also Romanized as Kalkenār) is a village in Poshtkuh Rural District, Chahardangeh District, Sari County, Mazandaran Province, Iran. At the 2006 census, its population was 111, in 25 families. Decreased to 58 people in 2016.
