= Kord Mir =

Village in Mazandaran province, Iran

Kord Mir Persian: كردمير
- Village
- Location within Iran
- Coordinates: 36°14′12″N 53°43′39″E
- Country: Iran
- Province: Mazandaran
- County: Sari
- District: Chahardangeh
- Rural District: Poshtkuh

Population (2016)
  - Total: 375
- Time zone: UTC+3:30 (IRST)

Kord Mir (Persian: كردمير) (Note: Also romanized as Kord Mīr) is a village in Poshtkuh Rural District of Chahardangeh District in Sari County, Mazandaran province, Iran.

== Demographics ==
=== Population ===
At the time of the 2006 National Census, the village's population was 384 in 81 households. The following census in 2011 counted 415 people in 122 households. The 2016 census measured the population of the village as 375 people in 137 households.
