= Ara, Iran =

Village in Mazandaran province, Iran

Ara Persian: اِرا
- Village
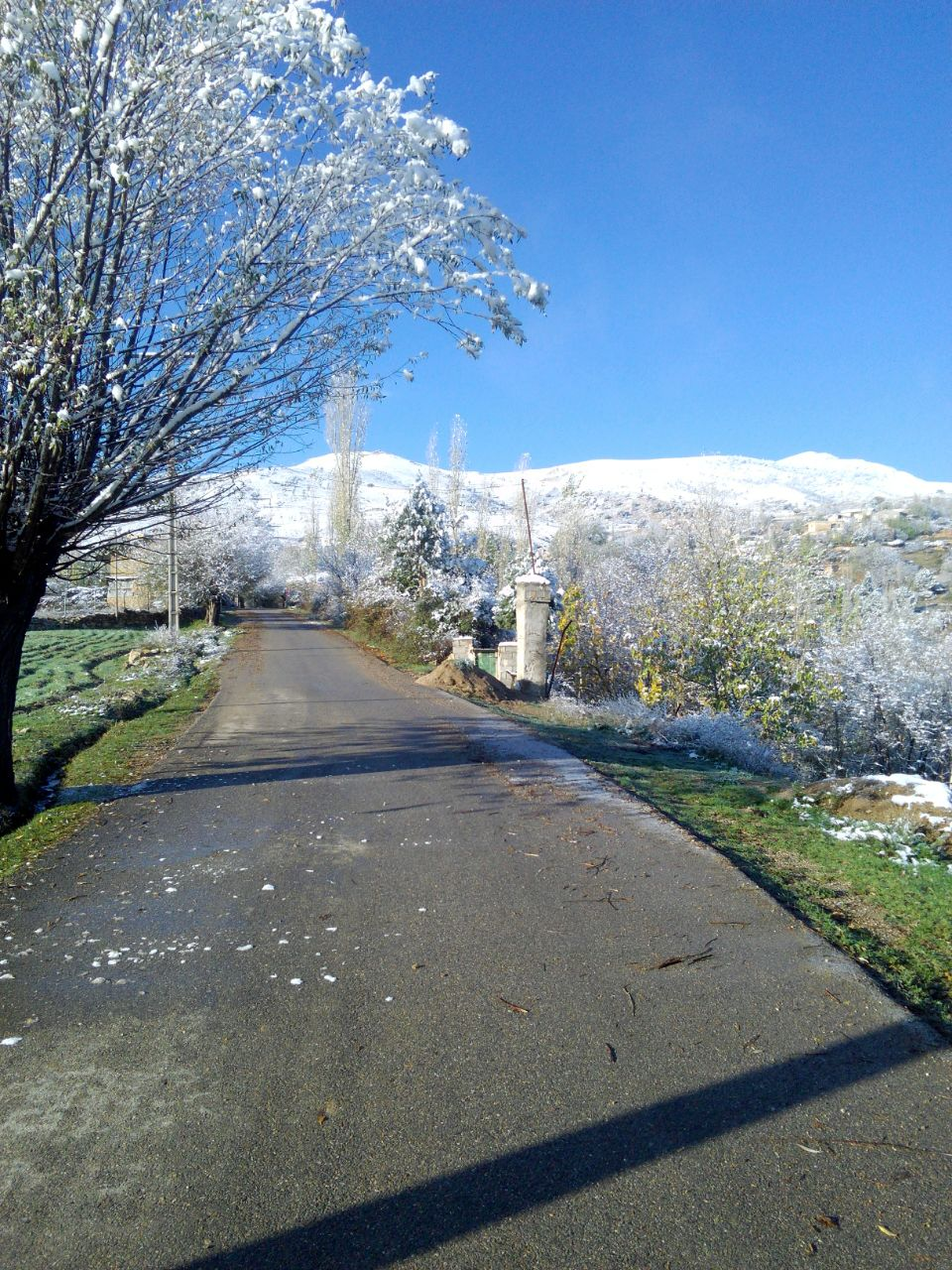
- The village of Ara

- Location within Iran
- Coordinates: 36°11′30″N 53°42′42″E
- Country: Iran
- Province: Mazandaran
- County: Sari
- District: Chahardangeh
- Rural District: Poshtkuh

Population (2016)
  - Total: 319
- Time zone: UTC+3:30 (IRST)

Ara (Persian: ارا) (Note: Also romanized as Arā, Arā’, Era, Erā, and Erā’) is a village in Poshtkuh Rural District of Chahardangeh District in Sari County, Mazandaran province, Iran.

== Demographics ==
=== Population ===
At the time of the 2006 National Census, the village's population was 384 in 109 households. The following census in 2011 counted 207 people in 74 households. The 2016 census measured the population of the village as 319 people in 116 households.
