= Kavat =

Village in Mazandaran province, Iran

Kavat Persian: كوات
- Village
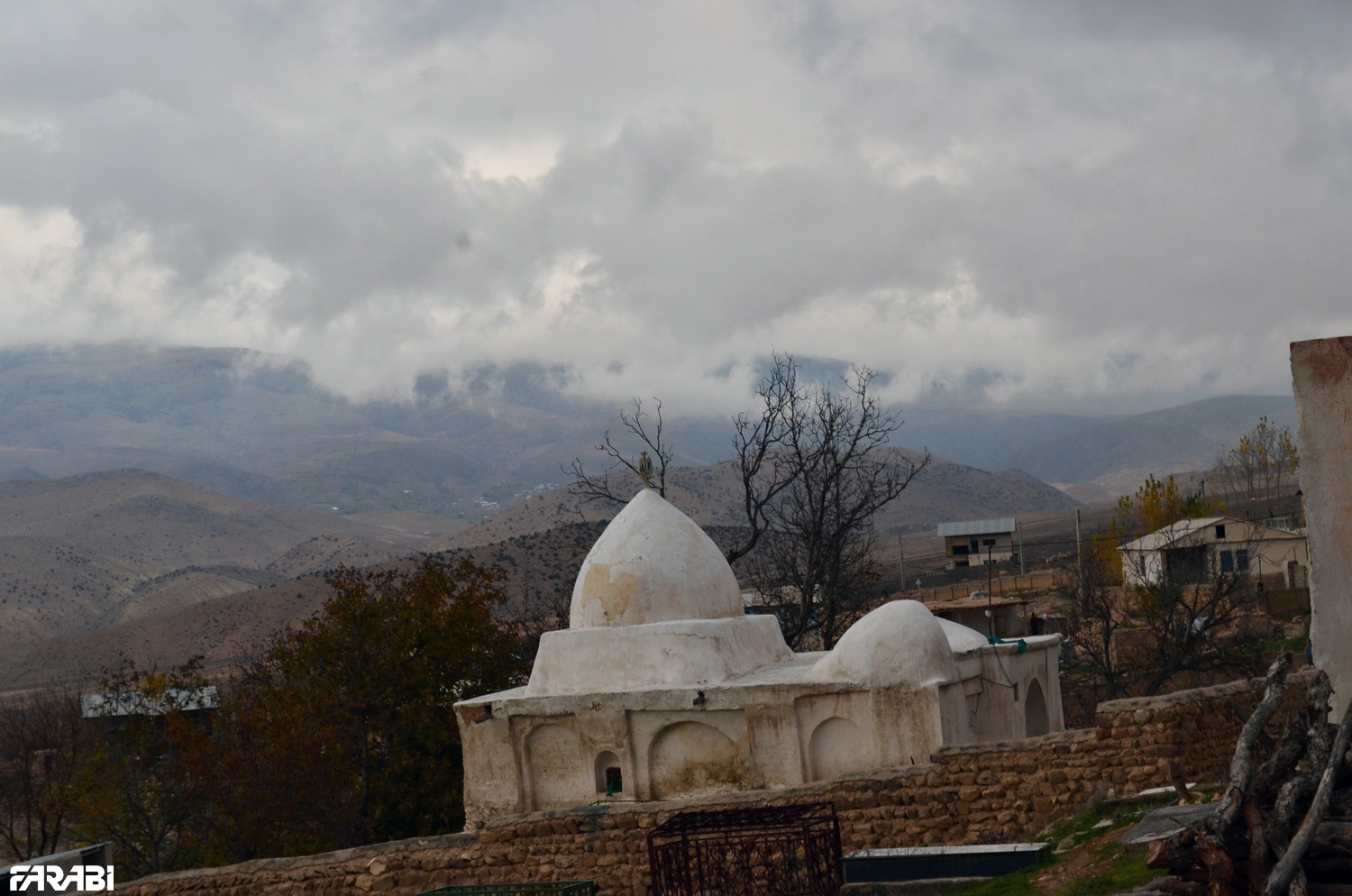
- Emamzadeh Shams ol Din mausoleum

- Location within Iran
- Coordinates: 36°16′40″N 53°49′00″E
- Country: Iran
- Province: Mazandaran
- County: Sari
- District: Chahardangeh
- Rural District: Poshtkuh

Population (2016)
  - Total: 227
- Time zone: UTC+3:30 (IRST)

Kavat (Persian: كوات) (Note: Also romanized as Kavāt; also known as Kavārt) is a village in Poshtkuh Rural District of Chahardangeh District in Sari County, Mazandaran province, Iran.

== Demographics ==
=== Population ===
At the time of the 2006 National Census, the village's population was 361 in 74 households. The following census in 2011 counted 339 people in 96 households. The 2016 census measured the population of the village as 227 people in 81 households.
