= Ali Kola, Sari =

Ali Kola عالی كلا
- Village
- Location within Iran
- Coordinates: 36°12′58″N 53°39′34″E
- Country: Iran
- Province: Mazandaran
- County: Sari
- Bakhsh: Chahardangeh
- Rural District: Poshtkuh

Population (2016)
  - Total: 49
- Time zone: UTC+3:30 (IRST)

Ali Kola (Persian: عالی كلا, also Romanized as ‘Alī Kolā, ‘Alī Kalā, and ‘Ālīkolā) is a village in Poshtkuh Rural District, Chahardangeh District, Sari County, Mazandaran Province, Iran.

== Demographics ==
At the 2006 census, its population was 108, in 25 families. Decreased to 49 people and 20 households in 2016.
