= Badab-e Surt =

Group of travertine terraces in northern Iran

Coordinates: 36°21′17″N 53°51′23″E

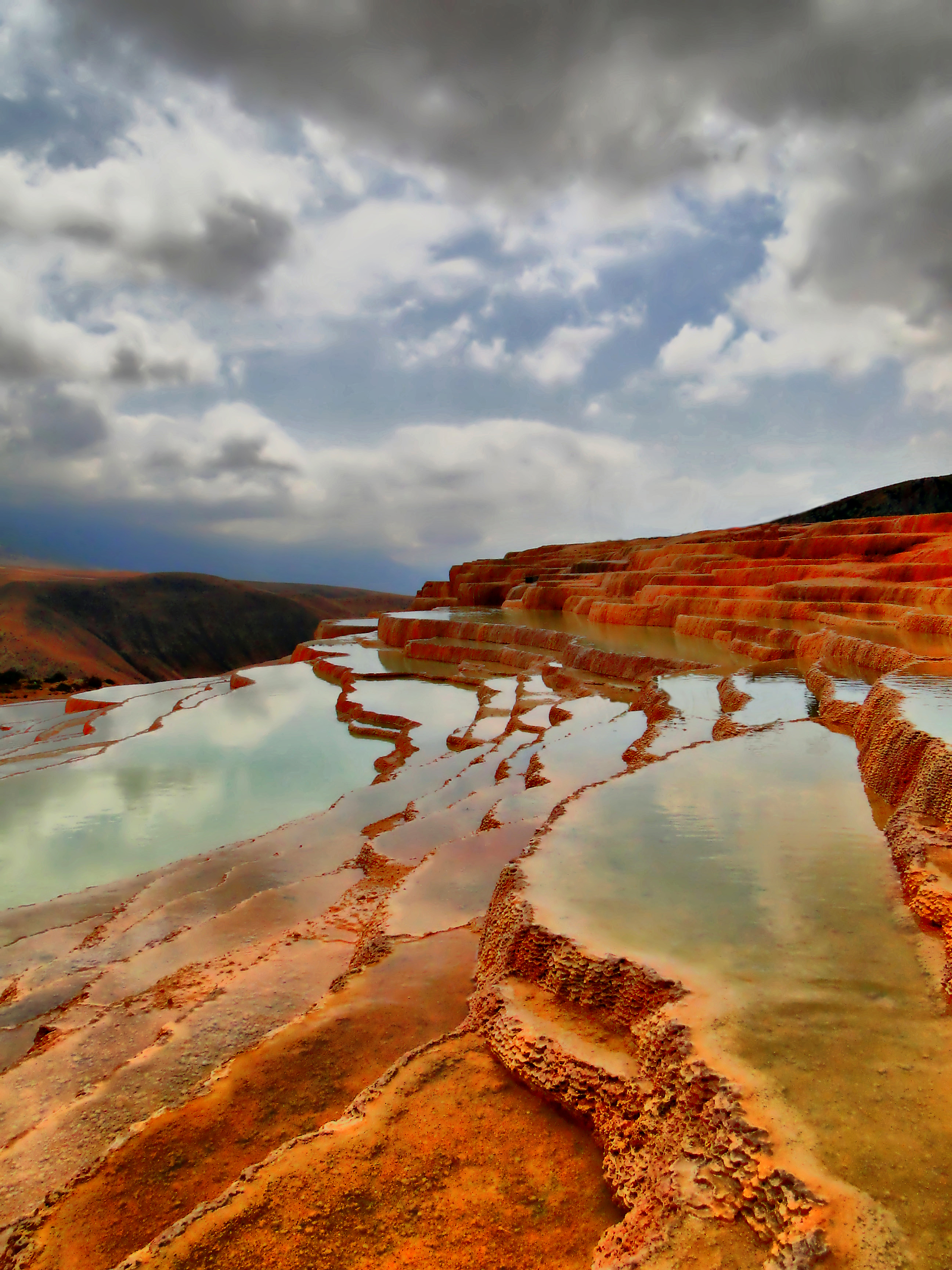
The red color of travertine terraces are due to iron carbonate

Badab Surt (Persian: باداب سورت) is a natural site in the Mazandaran Province in northern Iran, 95 kilometres (59 mi) south-east of the city of Sari, and 7 kilometres (4.3 mi) east of the village Orost. It comprises a range of stepped travertine terrace formations that have been created over thousands of years as flowing water from two mineral hot springs cooled and deposited carbonate minerals on the mountainside.

== Etymology ==
Badab is a Persian compound of the words bād (gas) + āb (water), translating to "gassed water", referring to the springs' waters being carbonated mineral waters. Soort is an old name for the Orost village and a Persian word meaning intensity.

== Geology ==
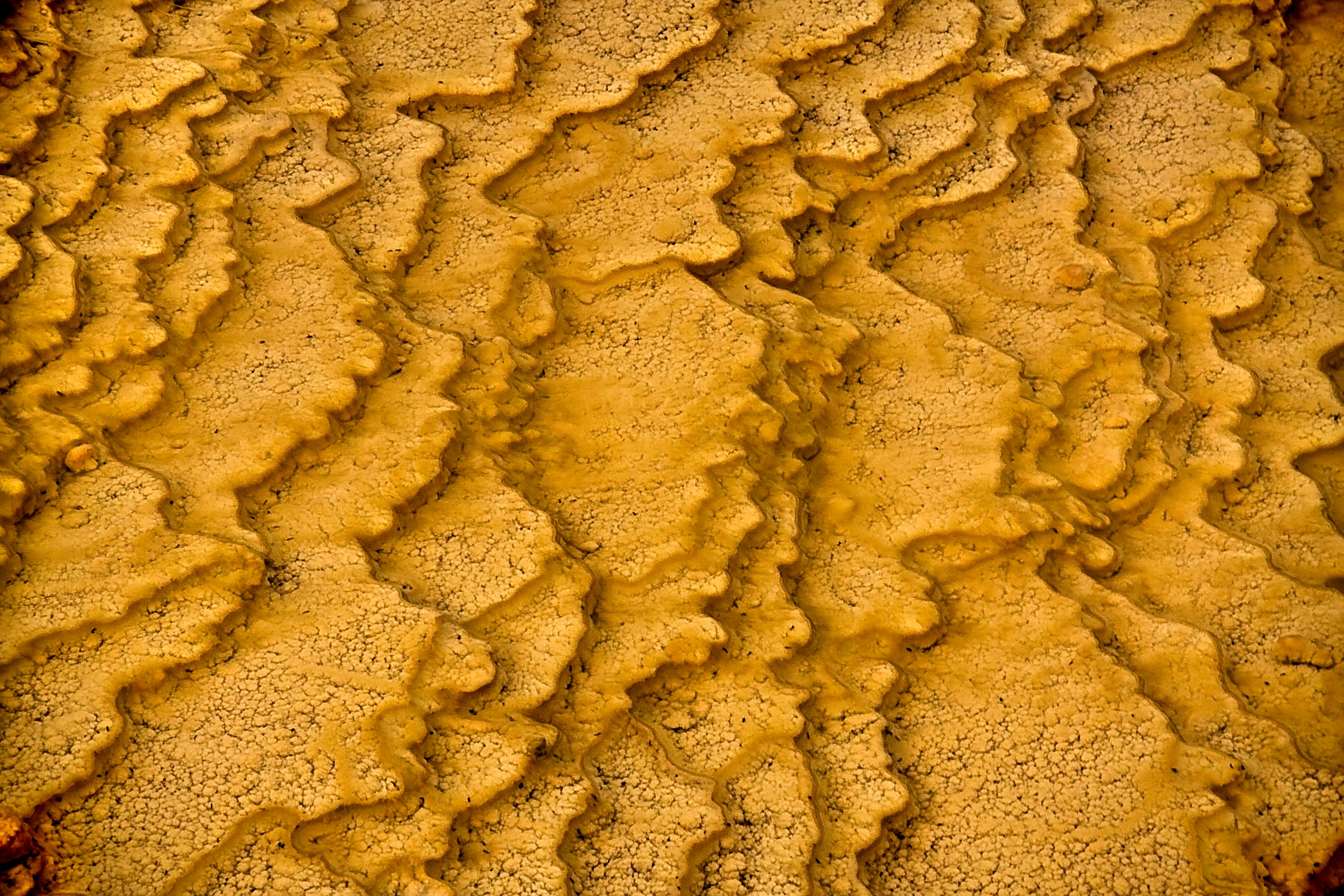
Yellow travertine terraces, seen from above

Badab Surt's springs are two distinct mineral springs with different natural characteristics, located at 1,840 metres (6,040 ft) above sea level. The first spring contains very salty water that collects in a small natural pool. Its water is believed to have medicinal properties, particularly as a remedy for rheumatism and certain skin diseases and conditions. The second spring has a sour taste and is predominantly orange mainly due to the large iron oxide sediments at its outlet.

Badab Surt's terraces are made of travertine, a sedimentary rock deposited by flowing water from the two distinct mineral springs; they were formed during Pleistocene and Pliocene geological periods. When the water, supersaturated with calcium carbonate and iron carbonate, reaches the surface, carbon dioxide degases from it, and mineral carbonates are deposited. The depositing continues until the carbon dioxide in the water balances the carbon dioxide in the air. Iron carbonate and calcium carbonate are deposited by the water as soft jellies, but they eventually harden into travertine.

As a result, over thousands of years, water from two springs emerging from the mountain range has combined to form a series of orange-, red-, and yellow-colored pools shaped like a naturally formed staircase. The surrounding vegetation varies by direction: to the north are pine forests; to the east, mainly short trees and shrubs; and to the west, rock quarries are visible.

== Panoramic view ==
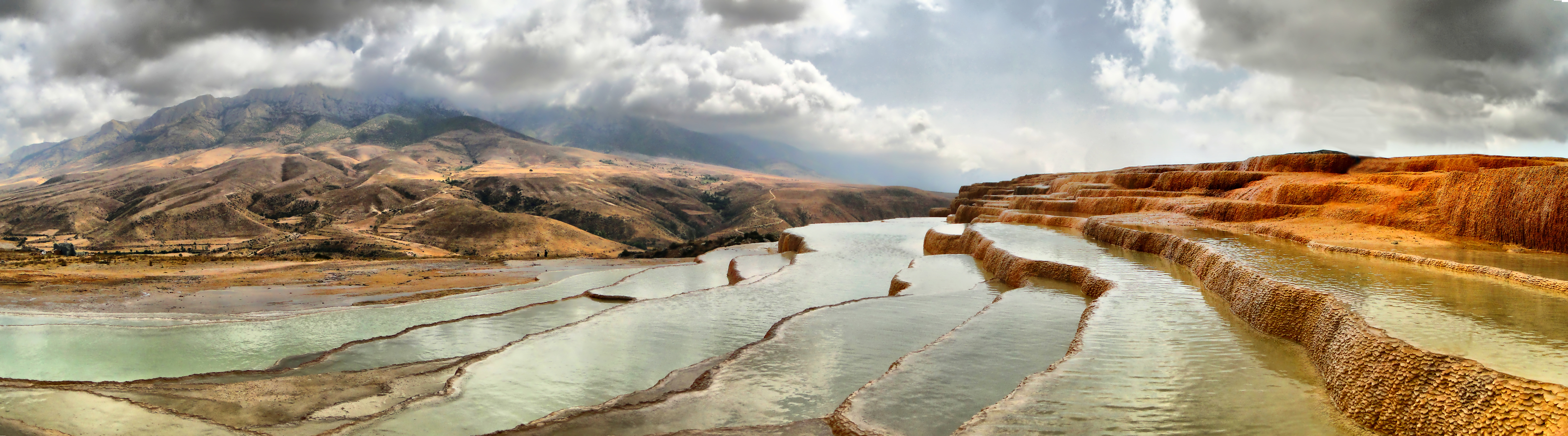
Stepped travertine terraces at the mineral springs of Badab-e Surt, in Mazandaran Province, Iran

== Similar places ==
- Mammoth Hot Springs in the USA
- Pamukkale in Turkey
- Huanglong Scenic and Historic Interest Area in China
