= Rudbar-e Telma Darreh =

Rudbar-e Telma Darreh Persian: رودبار تلمادره
- Village
- Location within Iran
- Coordinates: 36°13′17.1″N 53°44′6″E
- Country: Iran
- Province: Mazandaran
- County: Sari
- District: Chahardangeh
- Rural District: Poshtkuh

Population (2016 Census)
  - Total: 38
- Time zone: UTC+3:30 (IRST)

Rudbar-e Telma Darreh (Persian: رودبار تلمادره, also romanized as Rudbār-e Telmā Darreh) is a village in Poshtkuh Rural District, in Chahardangeh District of Sari County, Mazandaran Province, Iran. At the 2016 census, its population was 38 people, in 12 households.
