= Telma Darreh =

Village in Mazandaran province, Iran

Telma Darreh Persian: تلما دره
- Village
- Location within Iran
- Coordinates: 36°13′21″N 53°43′07″E
- Country: Iran
- Province: Mazandaran
- County: Sari
- District: Chahardangeh
- Rural District: Poshtkuh

Population (2016)
  - Total: 219
- Time zone: UTC+3:30 (IRST)

Telma Darreh (Persian: تلمادره) (Note: Also romanized as Talmā Darreh and Telmā Darreh) is a village in, and the capital of, Poshtkuh Rural District in Chahardangeh District of Sari County, Mazandaran province, Iran.

== Demographics ==
=== Population ===
At the time of the 2006 National Census, the village's population was 152 in 47 households. The following census in 2011 counted 232 people in 84 households. The 2016 census measured the population of the village as 219 people in 77 households.
