= Shaban Kheyl =

Shaban Kheyl شعبان خيل
- Village
- Location within Iran
- Coordinates: 36°14′29″N 53°39′08″E
- Country: Iran
- Province: Mazandaran
- County: Sari
- Bakhsh: Chahardangeh
- Rural District: Poshtkuh

Population (2006)
  - Total: 17
- Time zone: UTC+3:30 (IRST)

Shaban Kheyl (Persian: شعبان خيل, also Romanized as Shā‘bān Kheyl; also known as Shabānqol) is a village in Poshtkuh Rural District, Chahardangeh District, Sari County, Mazandaran Province, Iran. At the 2006 census, its population was 17, in 5 families. In 2016, the village had less than 4 households.
