= Qaleh Sar, Sari =

Village in Mazandaran province, Iran

Qaleh Sar Persian: قلعه سر
- Village
- Location within Iran
- Coordinates: 36°18′33″N 53°49′51″E
- Country: Iran
- Province: Mazandaran
- County: Sari
- District: Chahardangeh
- Rural District: Poshtkuh

Population (2016)
  - Total: 381
- Time zone: UTC+3:30 (IRST)

Qaleh Sar (Persian: قلعه سر) (Note: Also romanized as Qal‘eh Sar and Qal’eh Sar) is a village in Poshtkuh Rural District of Chahardangeh District in Sari County, Mazandaran province, Iran.

== Demographics ==
=== Population ===
At the time of the 2006 National Census, the village's population was 413 in 105 households. The following census in 2011 counted 433 people in 125 households. The 2016 census measured the population of the village as 381 people in 135 households.
