= Bard, Iran =

Bard برد
- Village
- Location within Iran
- Coordinates: 36°12′06″N 53°47′50″E
- Country: Iran
- Province: Mazandaran
- County: Sari
- Bakhsh: Chahardangeh
- Rural District: Poshtkuh

Population (2016)
  - Total: 92
- Time zone: UTC+3:30 (IRST)

Bard (Persian: برد) is a village in Poshtkuh Rural District, Chahardangeh District, Sari County, Mazandaran Province, Iran. At the 2006 census, its population was 213, in 54 families. Decreased to 92 people and 45 households in 2016.
