= Travertine =

Form of limestone deposited by mineral springs

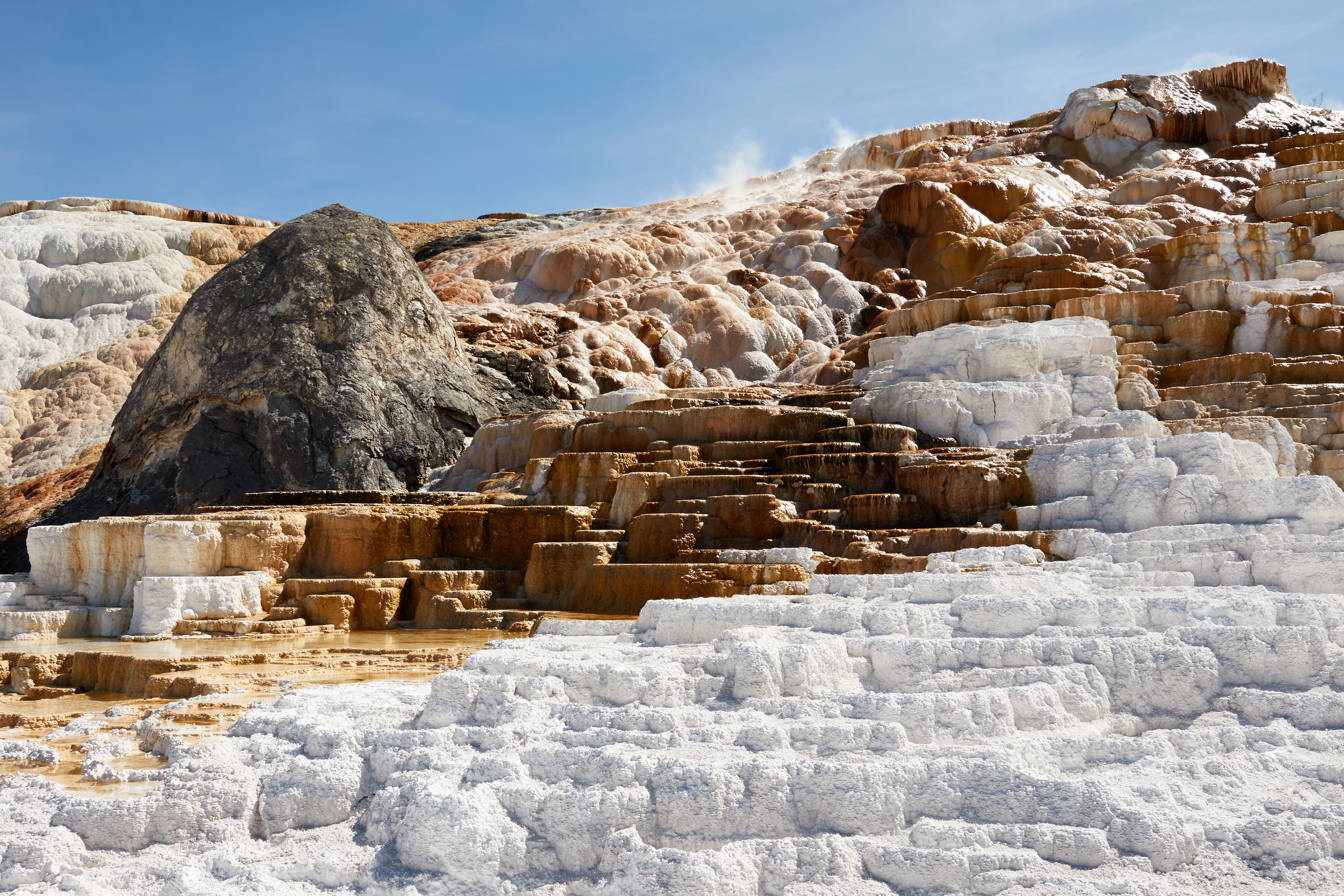
Travertine terraces (white) at Mammoth Hot Springs, Yellowstone National Park, in 2016

Travertine (/ˈtrævərtiːn/ TRAV-ər-teen) is a form of fresh water limestone deposited around mineral springs, especially hot springs. It often has a fibrous or concentric appearance and exists in white, tan, cream-colored, and rusty varieties. It is formed by a process of rapid precipitation of calcium carbonate, often at the mouth of a hot spring or in a limestone cave. In the latter, it can form stalactites, stalagmites, and other speleothems.

Travertine is frequently used in Italy and elsewhere as a building material. Similar, but softer and extremely porous, deposits formed from ambient-temperature water are known as tufa.

== Etymology ==
The word 'travertine' is derived from the Italian travertino, a derivation of the Latin tiburtinus meaning 'of Tibur', now known as Tivoli, near Rome, Italy.

== Definition ==
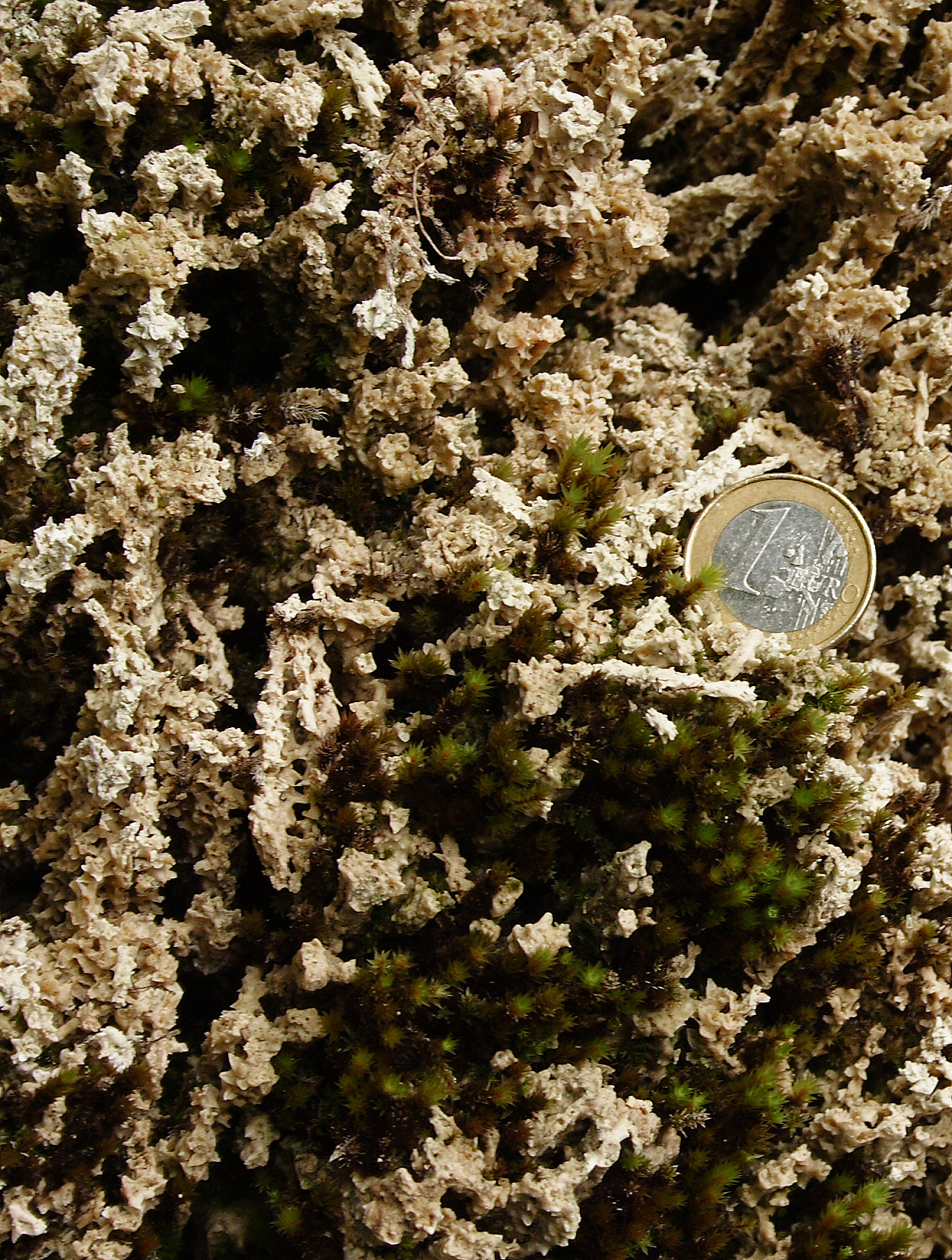
Calcium-carbonate-encrusted, growing moss in a low-temperature freshwater travertine formation (1 euro coin for scale)

Travertine is a sedimentary rock formed by the chemical precipitation of calcium carbonate minerals from fresh water, typically in springs, rivers, and lakes; that is, from surface and ground waters. In the broadest sense, travertine includes deposits in both hot and cold springs, including the porous, spongy rock known as tufa, and also the cave features known as speleothems (which include stalactites and stalagmites). Calcrete, which is calcium minerals deposited as a horizon in the soil profile, is not considered a form of travertine.

Travertine is often defined in a more narrow sense as dense rock, sometimes massive but more commonly banded or with a fibrous internal structure, deposited in hot springs. In this more narrow sense, travertine is distinct from speleothems and tufa. Travertine is sometimes defined by its mode of origin, as rock formed by inorganic precipitation of calcium carbonate minerals onto a surface following exchange of carbon dioxide between the atmosphere and groundwater. Calcrete, lake marls, and lake reefs are excluded from this definition, but both speleothems and tufa are included.

Fresh travertines vary widely in their porosity, from about 10% to 70%. Ancient ones may have porosities as low as 2% due to crystallization of secondary calcite in the original pore spaces, while some of the fresh aragonite travertine at Mammoth Hot Springs in Wyoming has a porosity greater than 80%. A porosity of about 50% is typical for cold spring travertine while hot spring travertines have a mean porosity of about 26%. Speleothems have low porosities of less than 15%.

== Landforms ==
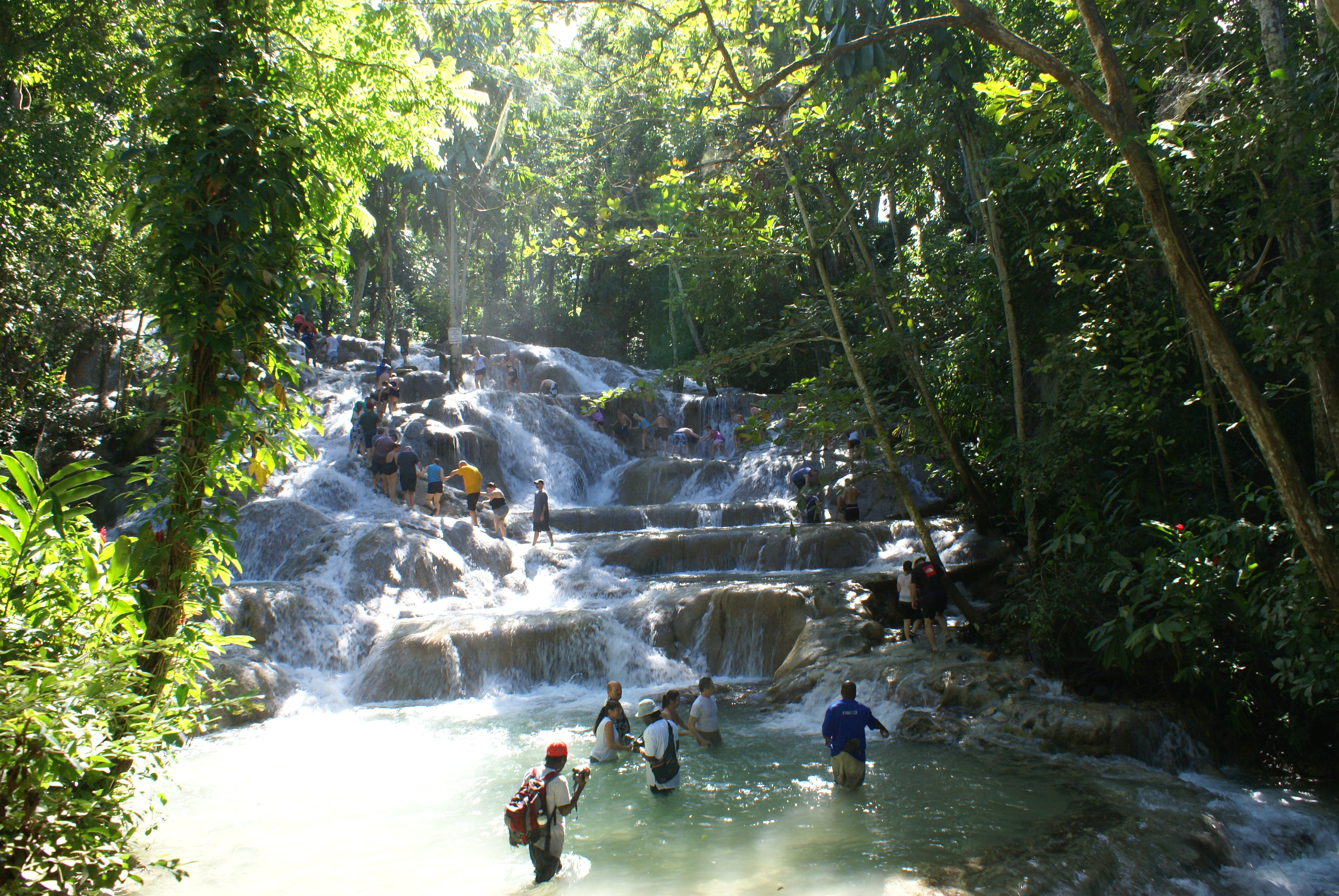
Tourists climb Dunns River Falls with the help of guides.

Travertine forms distinctive landforms:

- Spring mounds are domes of travertine ranging in height from less than a meter to over 100 metres (330 ft) surrounding a spring orifice. Because the spring orifice is above ground level, the formation of terrestrial mounds requires either an artesian spring or a geyser. Travertine mounds also are found under water, often in saline lakes.
- Fissure ridges form from spring discharge along joints or faults. These can be over 15 metres (49 ft) in height and 0.5 kilometres (0.31 mi) in length. These generally show signs of progressive widening of the fissure, balanced by deposition of travertine on the fissure wall.
- Cascade deposits are formed by a series of waterfalls. Dunns River Falls is one of the very few travertine falls that empty into the ocean.
- Dam deposits are similar to cascades but have localized vertical buildup of travertine that creates a pond or lake behind the travertine buildup.
- Travertine forms various kinds of fluvial and lacustrine deposits.
- Paludal (marsh) deposits are shallow accumulations in poorly-drained areas.
- Speleothems are the characteristic "formations" of caves.

== Geochemistry ==
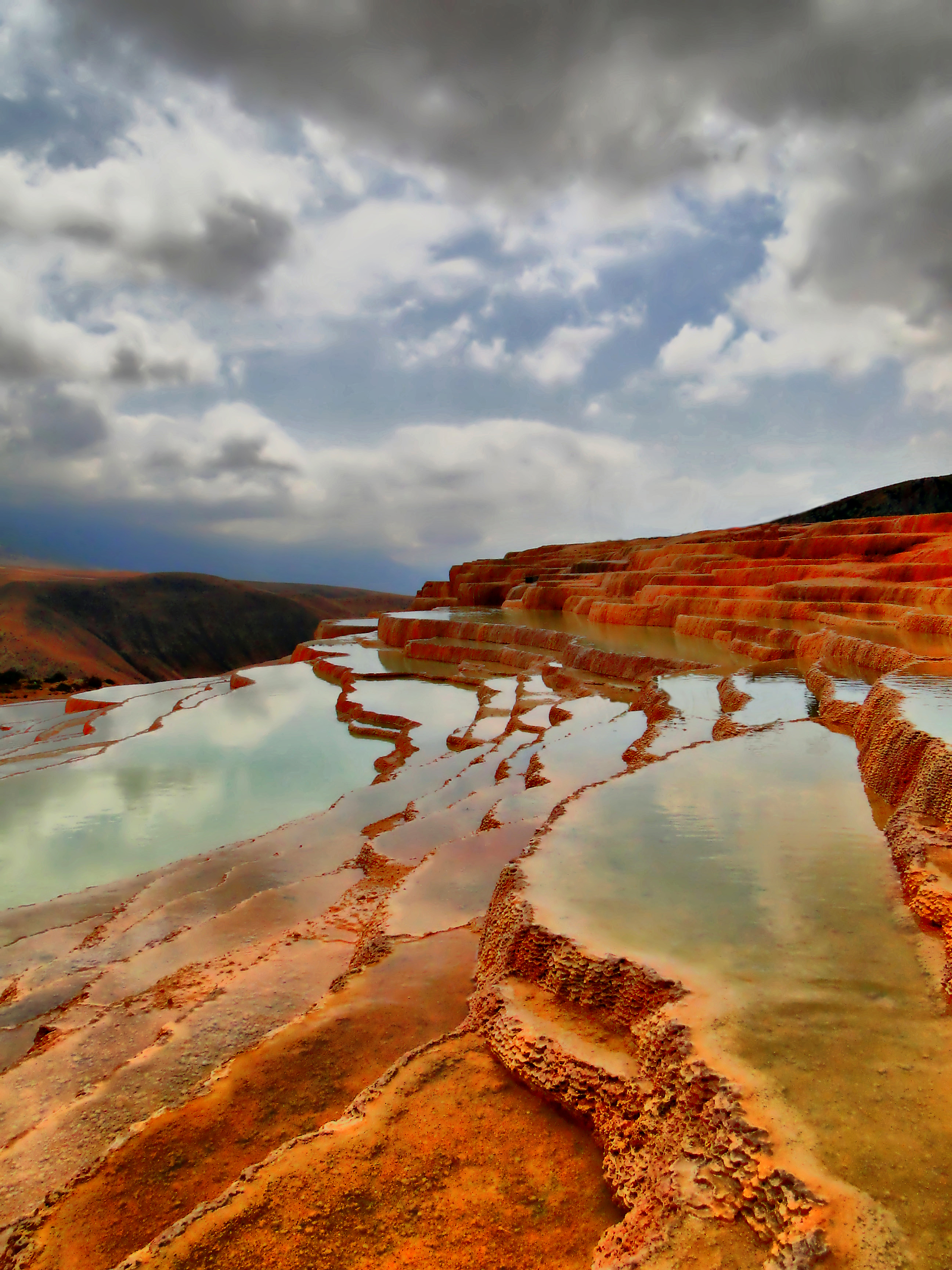
Badab-e Surt's stepped travertine terrace formations. This travertine owes its red colour to iron carbonate.

The formation of travertine begins when groundwater (H_{2}O) containing an elevated concentration of dissolved carbon dioxide (CO_{2}) comes in contact with limestone or other rock containing calcium carbonate (CaCO_{3}). The dissolved carbon dioxide acts as a weak acid, carbonic acid, which dissolves some of the limestone as soluble calcium bicarbonate (Ca^{+}_{2} + 2HCO^{−}_{3}):

CaCO_{3} + H_{2}O + CO_{2} ⇌ Ca^{2+} + 2HCO^{−}_{3}

This is a reversible reaction, meaning that as the concentration of dissolved calcium bicarbonate builds up, the calcium bicarbonate begins to revert to calcium carbonate, water, and carbon dioxide. So long as there is nowhere for the carbon dioxide to go, chemical equilibrium is reached where dissolution of calcium carbonate is balanced by precipitation of calcium carbonate.

If the groundwater moves into an environment with a lower concentration of carbon dioxide (as measured by its partial pressure, pCO_{2}), some of the carbon dioxide will escape into the environment, disturbing the equilibrium and allowing net precipitation of calcium carbonate to take place:

Ca^{2+} + 2HCO^{−}_{3} → CaCO_{3} + H_{2}O + CO_{2}

The calcium carbonate most readily precipitates onto solid surfaces bathed by the groundwater, eventually building up thick deposits of travertine. Because of the role of CO_{2} in dissolving and transporting calcium carbonate, it is sometimes described as the carrier CO_{2} or simply as the carrier.

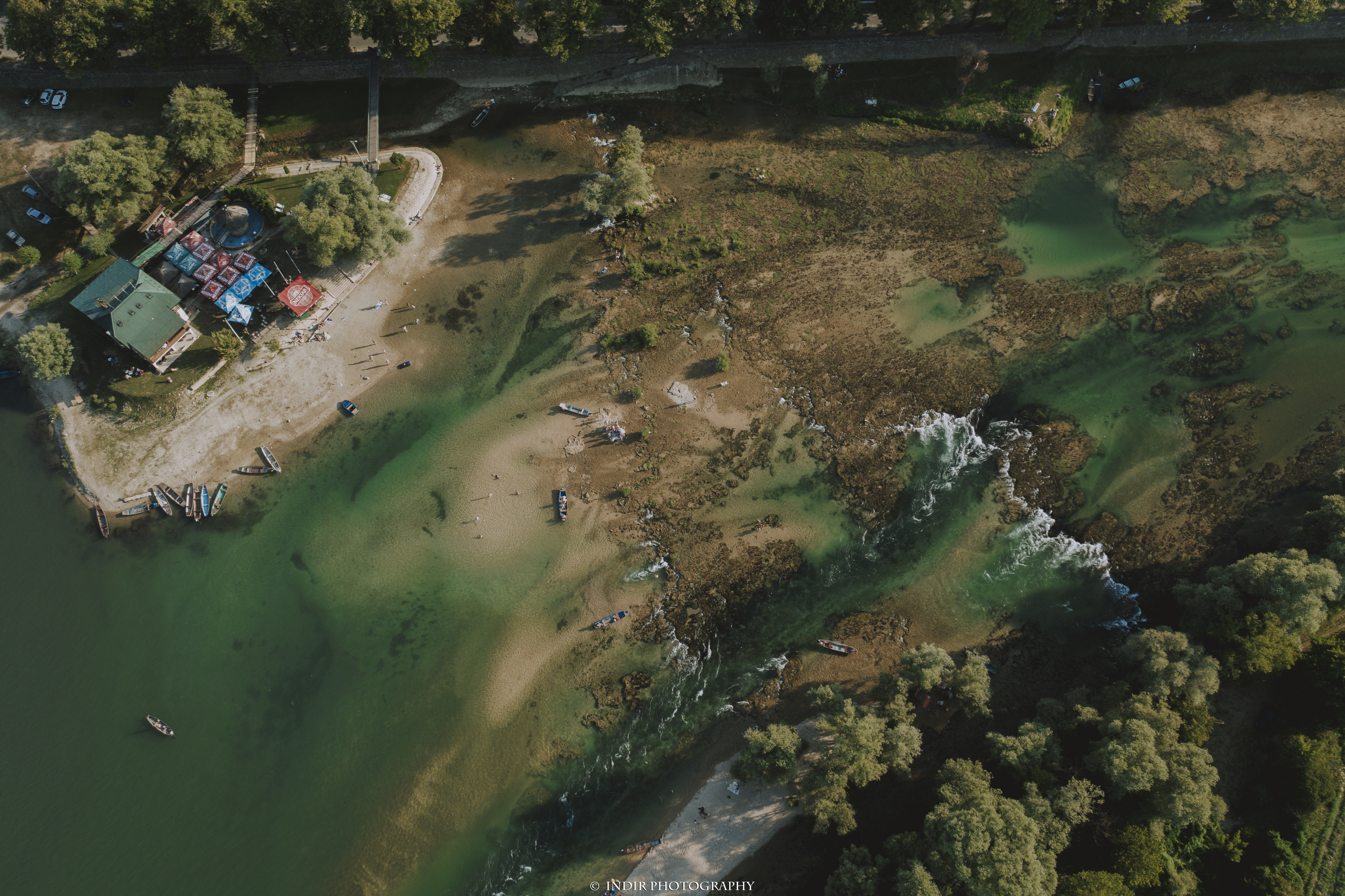
Tufa and travertine sediments visible on the Una river bed.

The most important sources of elevated carbon dioxide concentration in groundwater are soil and volcanic activity. Water passing through soil picks up carbon dioxide from plant roots and decaying organic matter. This CO_{2} is described as meteoric carrier, and the travertine formed by this mechanism as meteogene travertine. This is the principal mechanism for formation of speleothems. Groundwater with an enhanced concentration of CO_{2} absorbed from soil infiltrates underlying limestone, dissolving some of the limestone. When this groundwater then emerges into a cave with a lower concentration of CO_{2}, some of the CO_{2} escapes, allowing calcium carbonate to precipitate and build up stalactites, stalagmites, and other speleothems.

Volcanic activity is the source of carbon dioxide in groundwater that emerges from hot springs. When the water reaches the mouth of the spring, it rapidly loses carbon dioxide to the open air and precipitates calcium carbonate around the spring mouth. Travertine formed this way is described as thermogene travertine. This can form spectacular deposits of travertine, such as those of Pamukkale or Mammoth Hot Springs. The carbon dioxide may come from sources deep in the Earth, such as metamorphism of deeply buried rock. The carbon dioxide is carried to the surface by magma and is a major component of volcanic gases. Carbon dioxide may also be generated by magma bodies heating solid rock near the surface, through thermal decomposition of organic matter, or by reactions of quartz or other silica minerals with carbonate minerals.

Precipitation may be enhanced by factors leading to a reduction in pCO_{2}, for example increased air-water interactions at waterfalls may be important, as may photosynthesis.

Rarely, travertine may form from highly alkaline water containing dissolved calcium hydroxide (Ca^{+}_{2} + 2OH^{−}) produced during serpentinization of ultramafic rock. When this alkaline water reaches the surface, it absorbs carbon dioxide from the air to precipitate calcium carbonate:

Ca^{2+} + 2OH^{−} + CO_{2} → CaCO_{3} + H_{2}O

While water carbonated by volcanic activity is usually associated with hot springs, such water occasionally cools to near ambient temperature before emerging at the surface. Likewise, water carbonated by passage through soil will occasionally have circulated to sufficient depths that it is quite warm when it reemerges at the surface. Water carbonated by volcanic activity will nonetheless tend to have a higher content of dissolved calcium bicarbonate and will generally be more enriched in the heavier ^{13}C isotope.

Both of the major calcium carbonate minerals, calcite and aragonite, are found in hot spring travertines; aragonite is preferentially precipitated when temperatures are high, while calcite dominates when temperatures are lower. When pure and fine, travertine is white, but often it is brown to yellow due to impurities.

== Occurrence ==
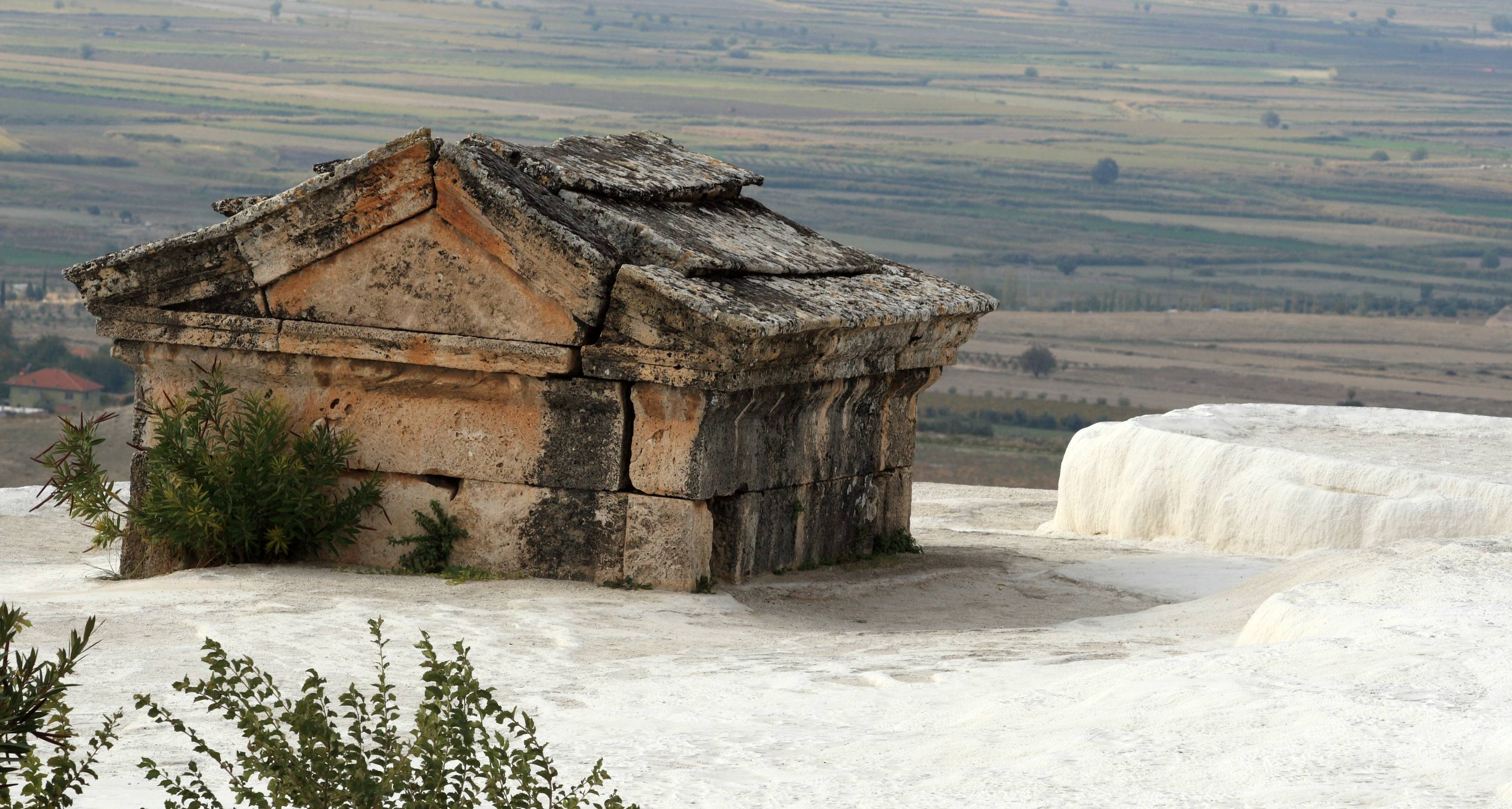
Mausoleum submerged in a travertine pool at Hierapolis hot springs, Turkey

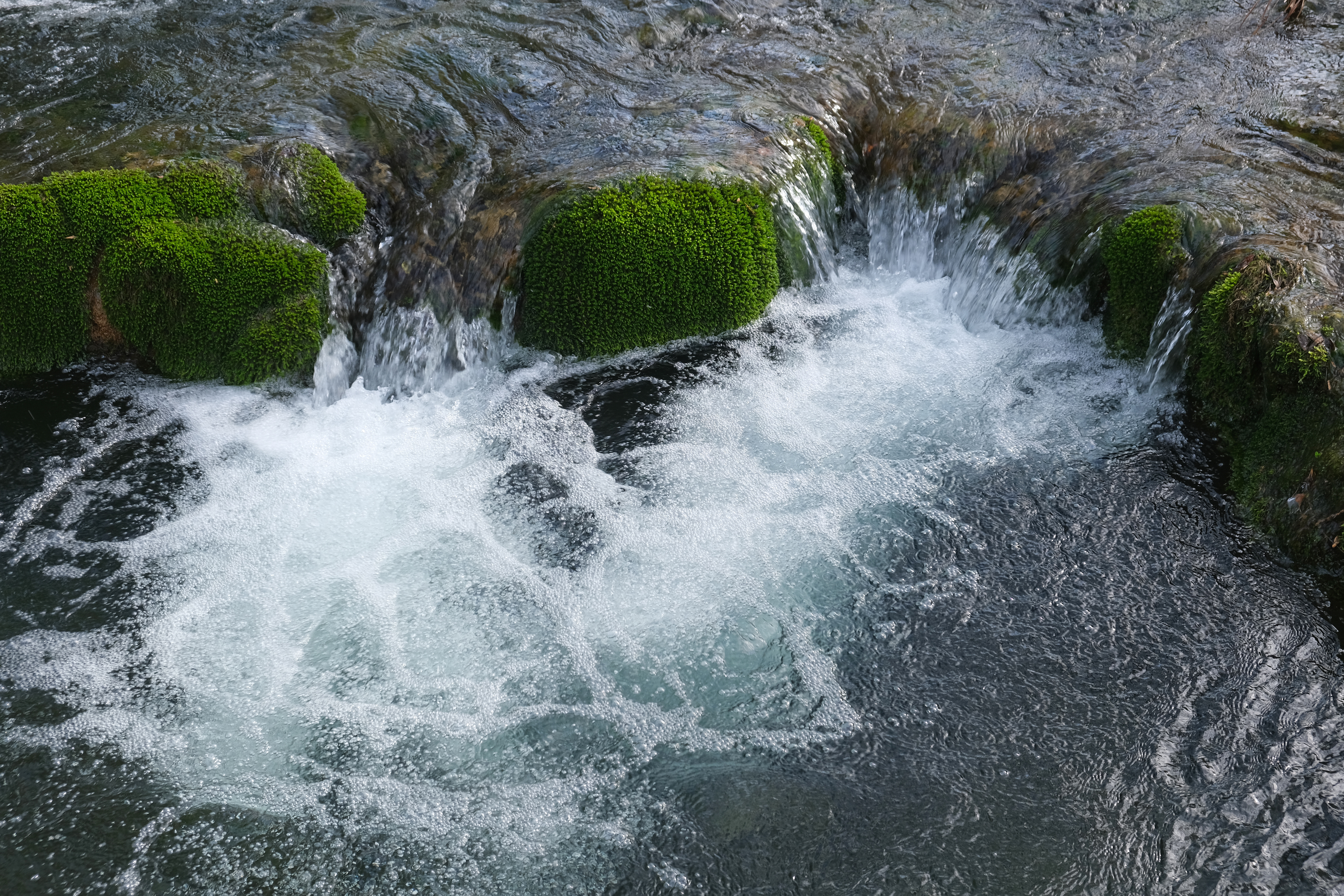
Tufa and travertine deposits on Krka National Park

Travertine is found in hundreds of locations around the world. The travertine found at Tivoli, 25 kilometers (16 mi) east of Rome, has been quarried for at least 2,000 years. Tivoli travertine was deposited in a body 20 square kilometers (7.7 sq mi) in area and 60 meters (200 ft) thick along a north-trending fault near the dormant Colli Albani volcano. The Guidonia quarry is located in this deposit of travertine.

The ancient name for this stone was lapis tiburtinus, meaning tiburtine stone, which gradually evolved into travertino (travertine). Detailed studies of the Tivoli and Guidonia travertine deposits revealed diurnal and annual rhythmic banding and laminae, which have potential use in geochronology. Deposits of travertine are found in about 100 other locations in Italy, including Rapalino near Pisa.

Cascades of natural lakes formed behind travertine dams can be seen in Pamukkale, Turkey, which is a UNESCO World Heritage Site. Other places with such cascades include Huanglong in Sichuan Province of China (another UNESCO World Heritage Site), the Mammoth Hot Springs in the United States, Egerszalók in Hungary, Mahallat, Abbass Abad, Atash Kooh, and Badab-e Surt in Iran, Band-i-Amir in Afghanistan, Lagunas de Ruidera, Spain, Hierve el Agua, Oaxaca, Mexico and Semuc Champey, Guatemala.

In Central Europe's last post-glacial palaeoclimatic optimum (Atlantic Period, 8000–5000 BC), huge deposits of tufa formed from karst springs. On a smaller scale, these karst processes are still working. Important geotopes are found at the Swabian Alb, mainly in valleys at the foremost northwest ridge of the cuesta; in many valleys of the eroded periphery of the karstic Franconian Jura; and at the northern Alpine foothills.

Dinaric karst watercourses, especially those in Bosnia and Herzegovina and Croatia, are known for build-up of rich travertine deposits and associated phenomena such as tufa and travertine caves, river islets, barriers and waterfalls. In Bosnia and Herzegovina Una river is particularly rich in deposits, and so is Pliva, Trebižat, Buna, Bregava. Travertine has formed 16 natural dams in a valley in Croatia known as Plitvice Lakes National Park. Clinging to moss and rocks in the water, the travertine has built up over several millennia to form waterfalls up to 70 m (230 ft) in height. Also in Croatia the Krka, Zrmanja with Krupa tributary, and Kupa in Croatia and Slovenia, and Krka in Slovenia.

In the United States, the most well-known place for travertine formation is Yellowstone National Park, where the geothermal areas are rich in travertine deposits. Wyoming also has travertines in Hot Springs State Park in Thermopolis. Oklahoma has two parks dedicated to this natural wonder. Turner Falls, the tallest waterfall in Oklahoma, is a 77 feet (23 m) cascade of spring water flowing over a travertine cave. Honey Creek feeds this waterfall and creates miles of travertine shelves both up and downstream. Many small waterfalls upstream in the dense woods repeat the travertine-formation effect. Another travertine resource is in Sulphur, Oklahoma, 10 miles (16 km) east of Turner Falls. Travertine Creek flows through a spring-water nature preserve within the boundaries of the Chickasaw National Recreation Area.

Austin, Texas, and the surrounding "Hill Country" to the south is built on limestone. The area has many travertine formations, such as those found at Gorman Falls within Colorado Bend State Park. Hanging Lake in Glenwood Canyon in Colorado was formed by travertine dams across a spring-fed stream. Travertine beds in the area are as much as 40 feet (12 m) thick. Rifle Falls State Park in Colorado features a triple waterfall over a travertine dam.

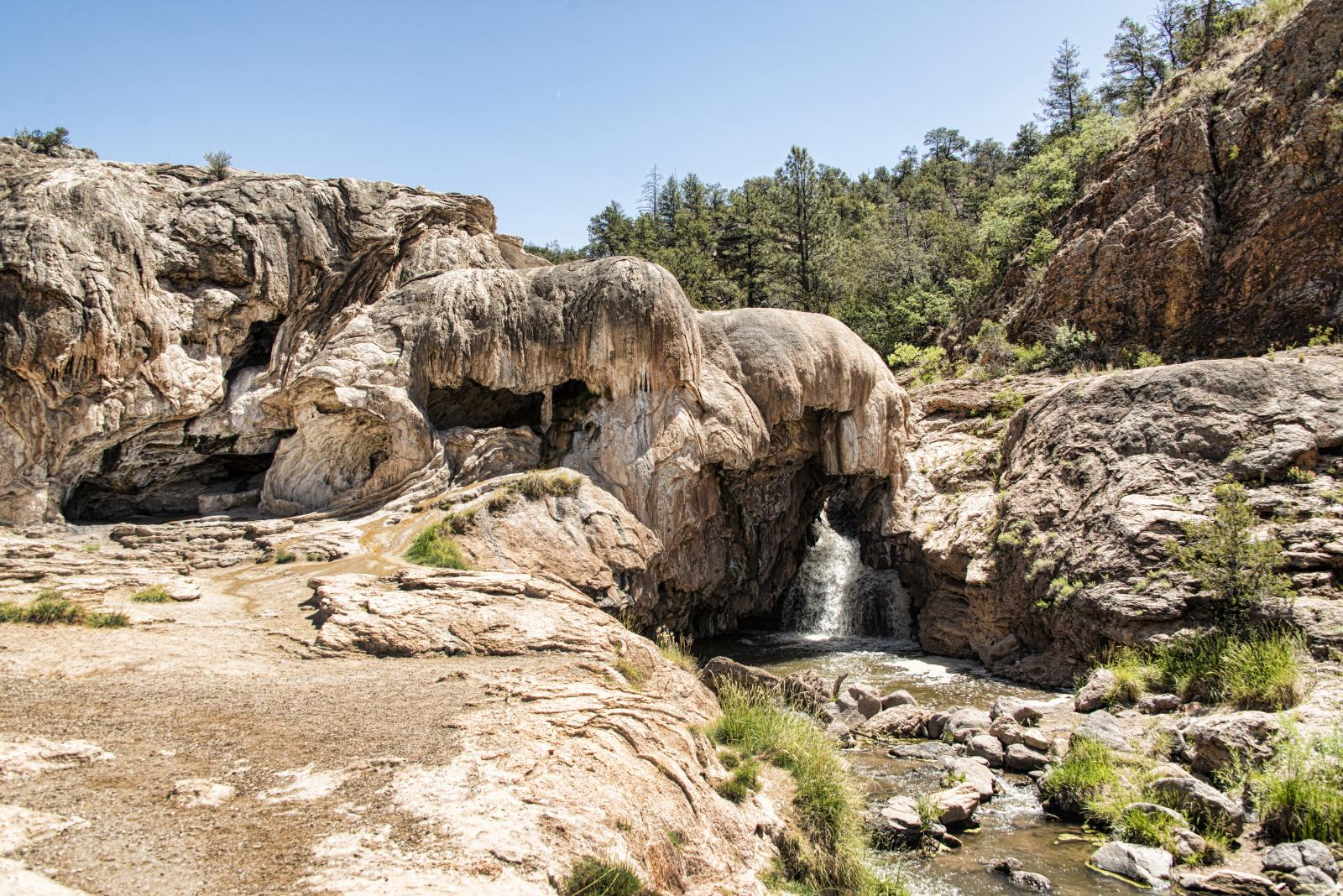
Soda Dam, Jemez Mountains, New Mexico

The Soda Dam Hot Spring system of the Jemez Mountains of New Mexico have been intensively investigated because of its connection to the geothermal system of the Valles caldera. Hot groundwater from the caldera has moved along the Jemez fault, and mixed with cooler groundwater before emerging at the surface. Radiometric dating of the travertines show that deposition began almost immediately after the Valles caldera eruption and that the area is experiencing deposition that began 5,000 years ago. A new species of the extremophile green algae Scenedesmus was first isolated from the travertine of Soda Dam.

In Iceland, the Hvanná river, located at the north flank of the Eyjafjallajökull, was heavily charged with CO_{2} following the 2010 eruptions. Travertine precipitated along the river.

== Uses ==
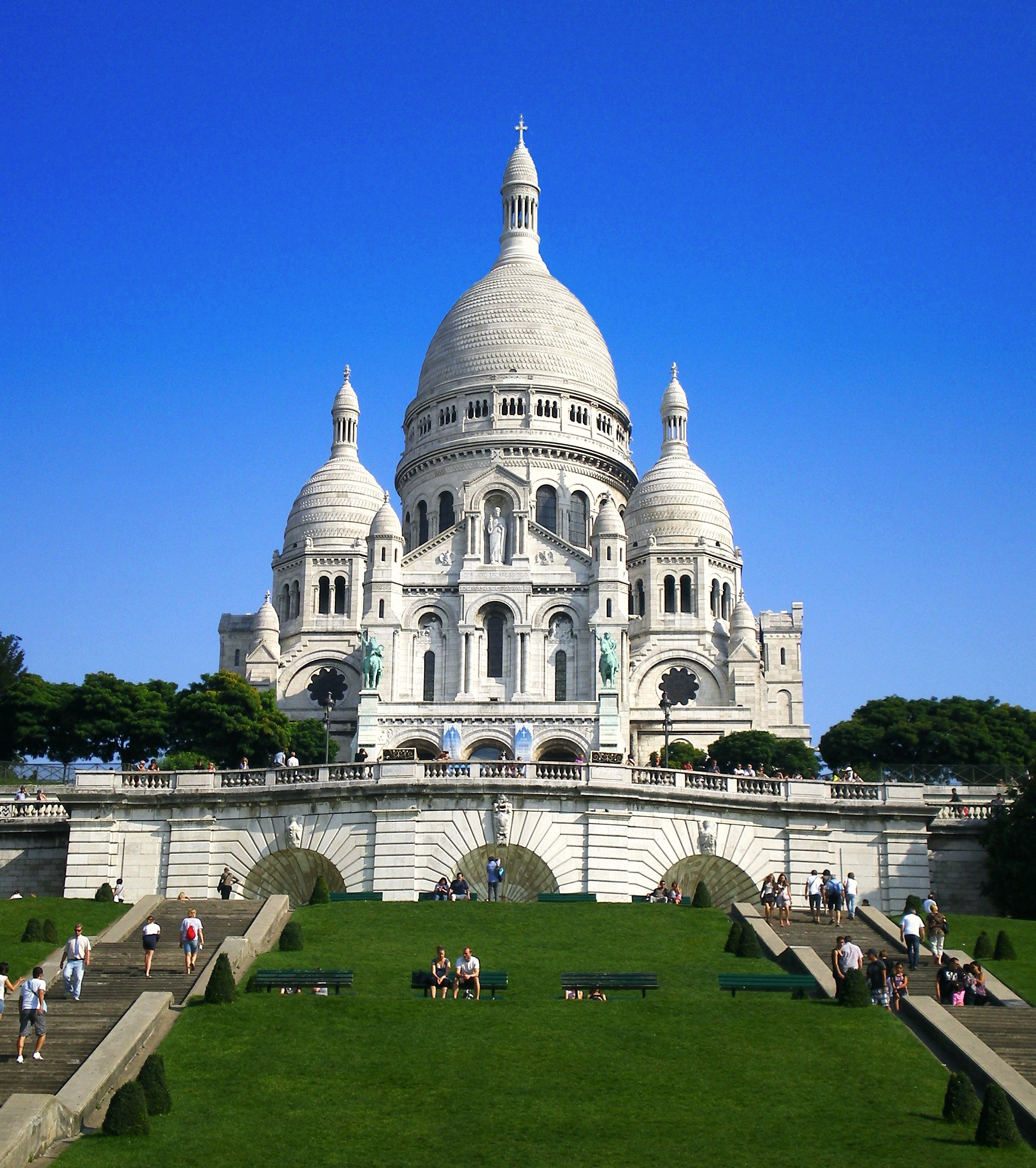
Sacré-Cœur, Paris, (1875–1914)

Travertine is often used as a building material. It typically lacks planes of weakness, and its high porosity makes it light in weight for its strength, gives it good thermal and acoustic insulating properties, and makes it relatively easy to work. Dense travertine makes excellent decorative stone when polished.

The Romans mined deposits of travertine for building temples, monuments, aqueducts, bath complexes, and amphitheaters such as the Colosseum, the largest building in the world constructed mostly of travertine. In Italy, well-known travertine quarries exist in Tivoli and Guidonia Montecelio, where the most important quarries since ancient Roman times can be found. The Tivoli quarries supplied the travertine from which Gian Lorenzo Bernini selected material from which to build the colonnade of St. Peter's Square in Rome (colonnato di Piazza S. Pietro) in 1656–1667. Michelangelo also chose travertine as the material for the external ribs of the dome of St. Peter's Basilica. Travertine from Tivoli was used in the sculpting of the majority of the Trevi Fountain in Rome during the Baroque period.

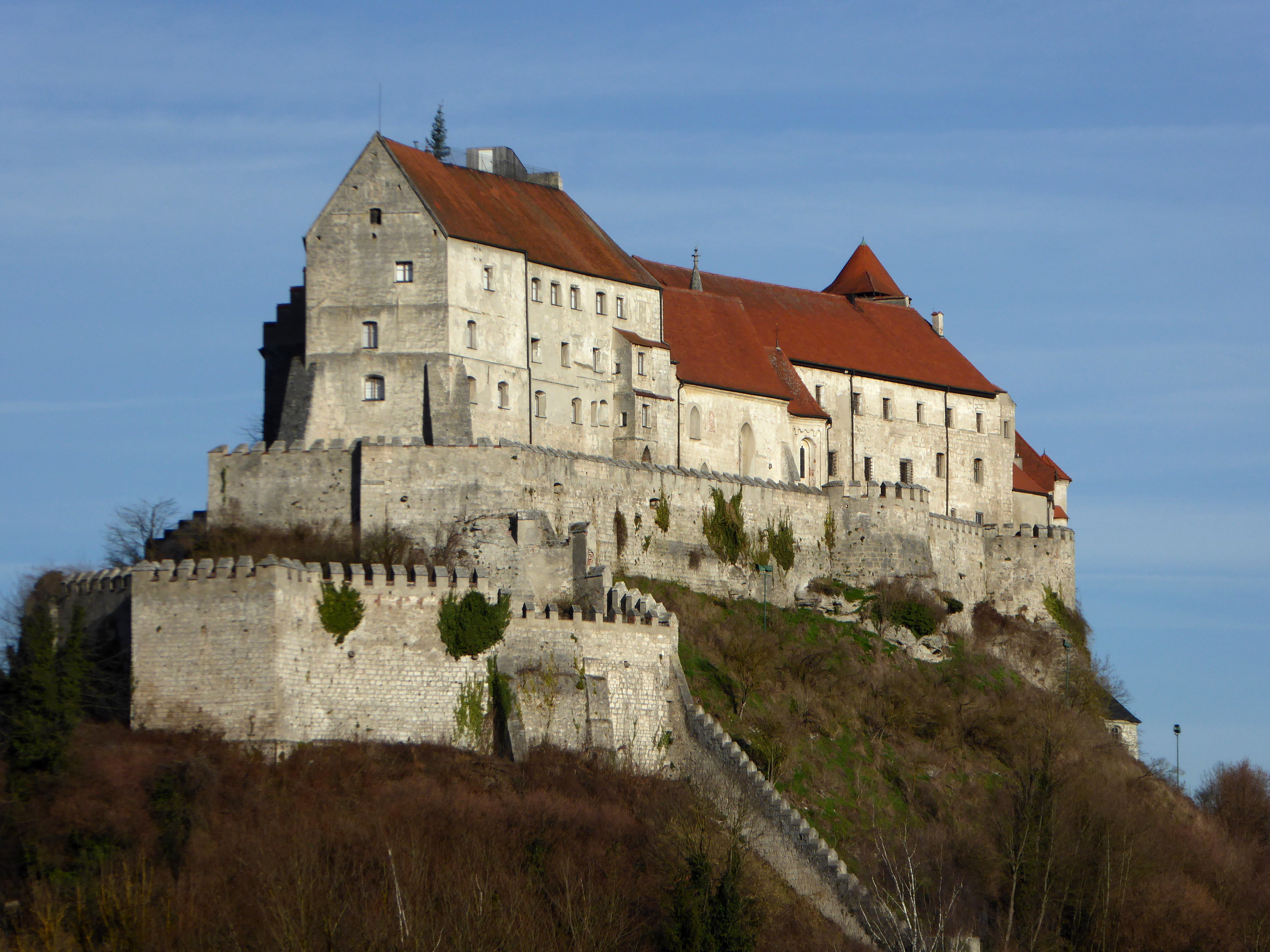
Burghausen Castle, Europe's longest castle, is 1,000 years old and built mainly with travertine.

Travertine regained popularity as a building material in the Middle Ages. The central German town of Bad Langensalza has an extant medieval old town built almost entirely of local travertine. Twentieth-century buildings using travertine extensively include the Sacré-Cœur Basilica in Paris, the Getty Center in Los Angeles, California, and Shell-Haus in Berlin. The travertine used in the Getty Center and Shell-Haus constructions was imported from Tivoli and Guidonia.

Travertine is one of several natural stones that is used for paving patios and garden paths. It is sometimes known as travertine limestone or travertine marble; these are the same stone, although travertine is classified properly as a type of limestone, not marble. The stone is characterised by pitted holes and troughs in its surface. Although these troughs occur naturally, they suggest signs of considerable wear and tear over time. It can be polished to a smooth, shiny finish, and comes in a variety of colors from grey to coral-red. Travertine is available in tile sizes for floor installations.

Travertine is one of the most frequently used stones in modern architecture. It is commonly used for indoor home/business flooring, outdoor patio flooring, spa walls and ceilings, façades, and wall cladding. The lobby walls of the modernist Willis Tower (1970) (formerly Sears Tower) in Chicago are made of travertine. Architect Welton Becket frequently incorporated travertine into many of his projects. The Ronald Reagan UCLA Medical Center is clad with over 3 million pounds (about 1360 tonnes) of Ambra Light travertine from the Tivoli quarries. Architect Ludwig Mies van der Rohe used travertine in several of his major works, including the Toronto-Dominion Centre, S.R. Crown Hall, the Farnsworth House and the Barcelona Pavilion. The New Mexico State Capitol has its rotunda finished with travertine mined from a deposit west of Belen, New Mexico. Stone from this quarry is also used in buildings at the University of New Mexico.

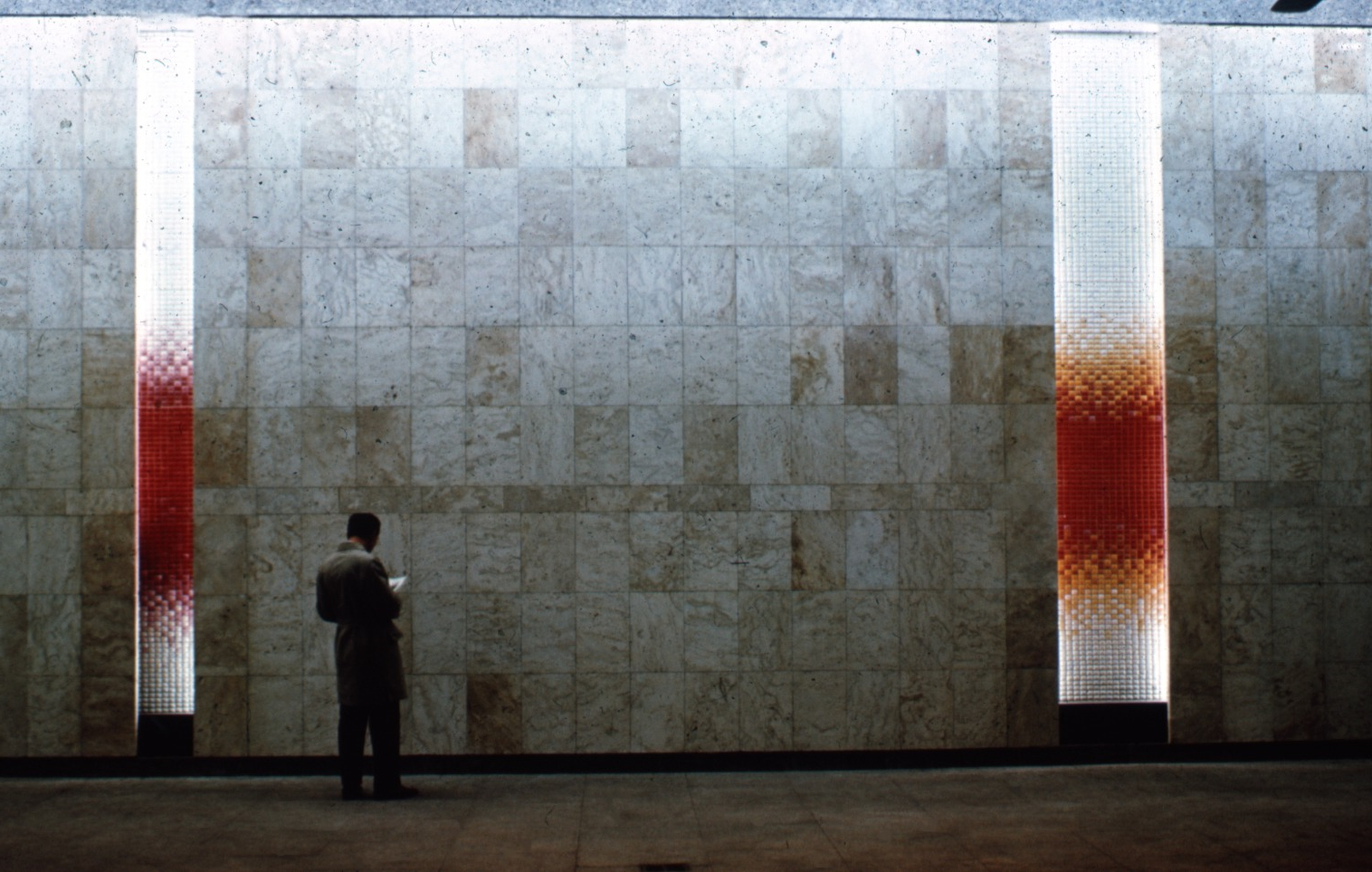
Travertine walls together with op art ceramic mosaics by Wojciech Fangor in Warszawa Śródmieście railway station in Warsaw, Poland (1963).

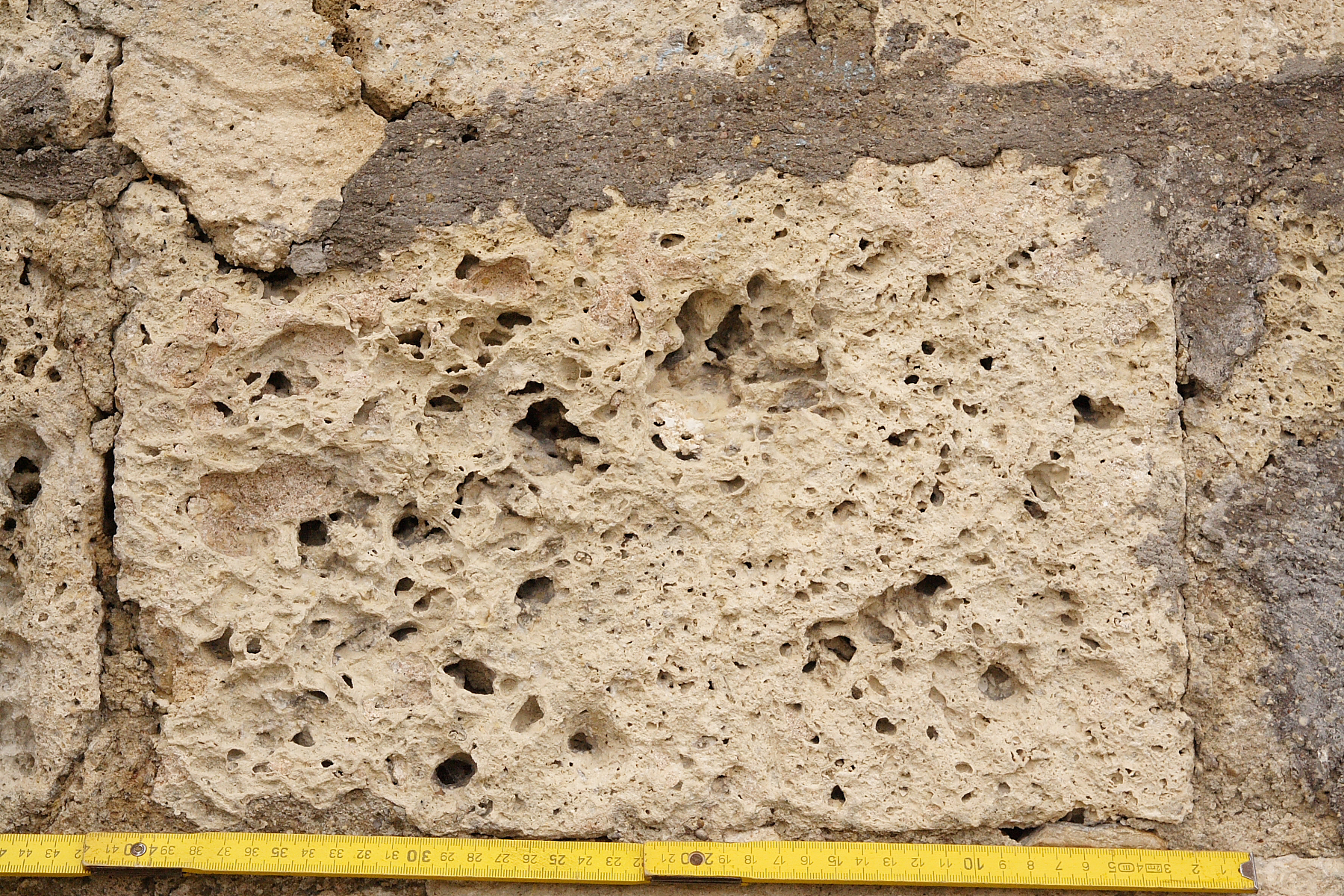
Travertine in a 400-year-old wall

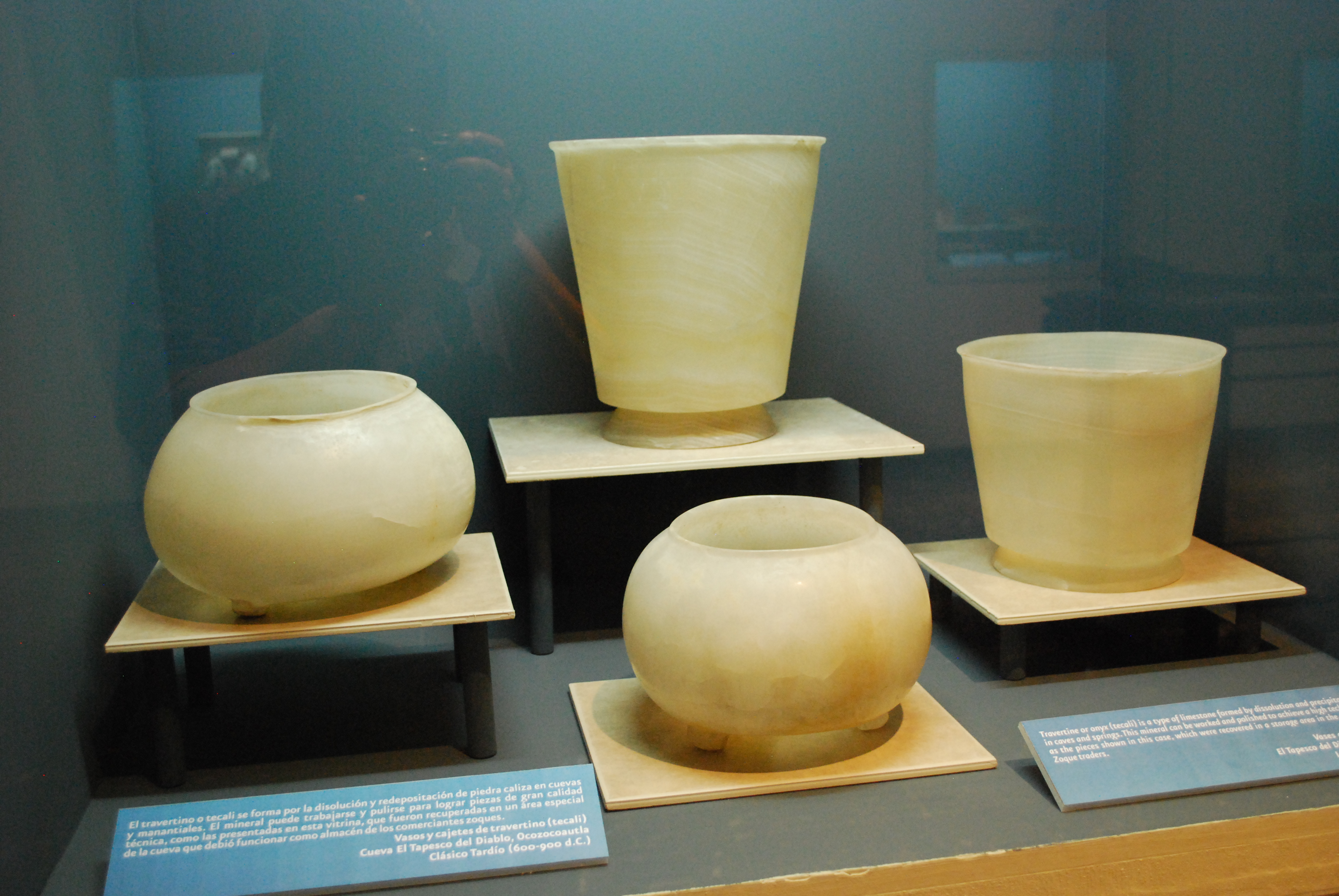
Travertine vessels found in El Tapesco del Diablo Cave in Ocozocoautla, Chiapas, Mexico (600–900 AD)

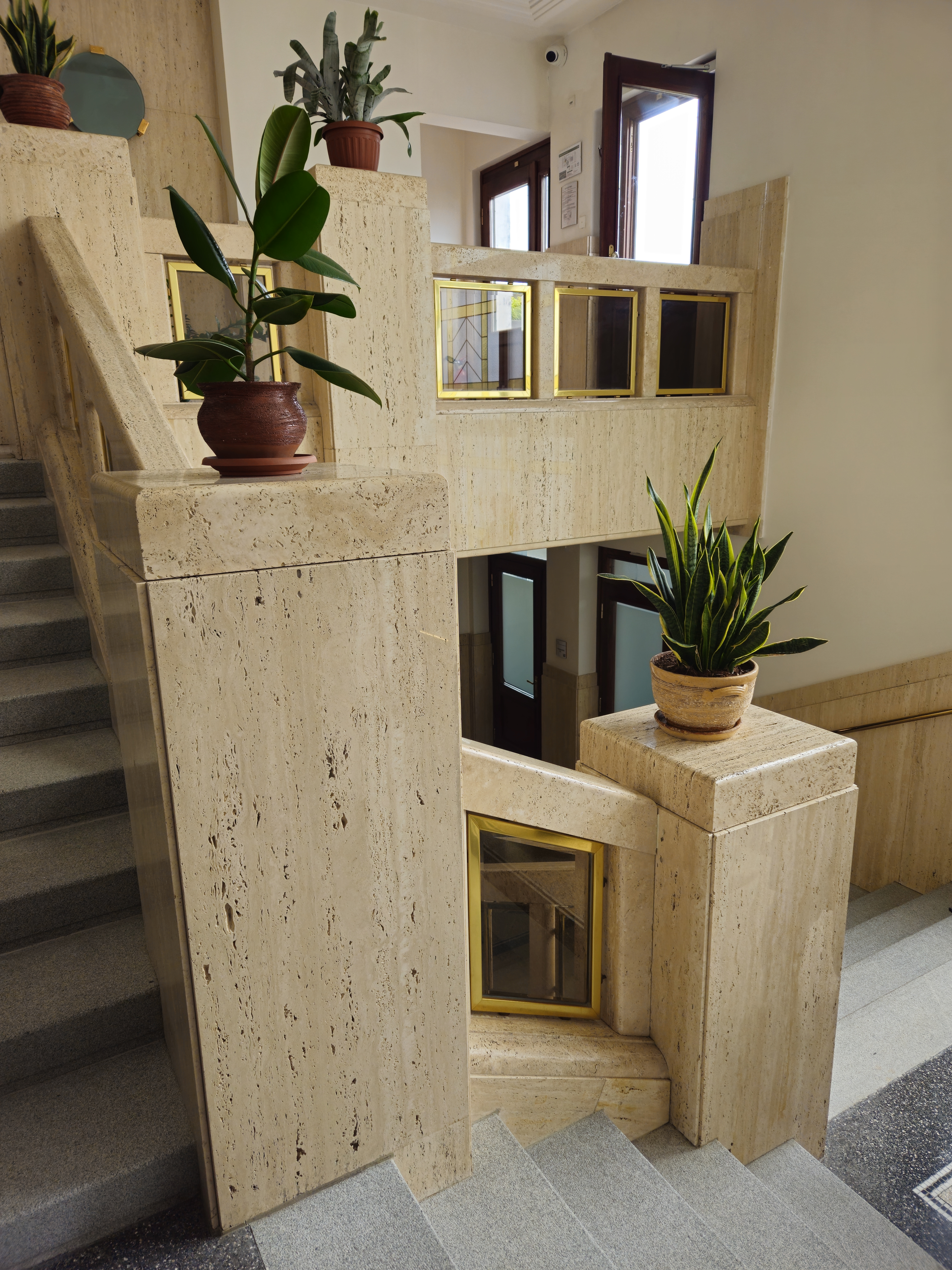
Elements around the staircase

== Supply ==
Until the 1980s, Italy had a near-monopoly on the world travertine market; now significant supplies are quarried in Turkey, Mexico, China, Peru, and Spain. US imports of travertine in 2019 were 17,808 metric tons, of which 12,804 were from Turkey.

== See also ==
- Alabaster – Lightly colored, translucent, and soft calcium minerals, typically gypsum – see the variety called "onyx-marble", actually a travertine
- Calcareous sinter – Freshwater calcium carbonate deposit
- Calthemite – Secondary calcium carbonate deposit growing under man-made structures
- Karst topography – Topography from dissolved soluble rocks
- List of types of limestone – Limestone deposits listed by location
