= Peshert =

Village in Mazandaran province, Iran

Peshert Persian: پشرت
- Village
- Location within Iran
- Coordinates: 36°15′32″N 53°47′31″E
- Country: Iran
- Province: Mazandaran
- County: Sari
- District: Chahardangeh
- Rural District: Poshtkuh

Population (2016)
  - Total: 161
- Time zone: UTC+3:30 (IRST)

Peshert (Persian: پشرت) (Note: Also romanized as Pashret and Peshrat; also known as Pishirt) is a village in Poshtkuh Rural District of Chahardangeh District in Sari County, Mazandaran province, Iran.

== Demographics ==
=== Population ===
At the time of the 2006 National Census, the village's population was 184 in 42 households. The following census in 2011 counted 141 people in 31 households. The 2016 census measured the population of the village as 161 people in 47 households.
