= Mal Khast =

Village in Mazandaran province, Iran

Mal Khast Persian: مال خاست
- Village
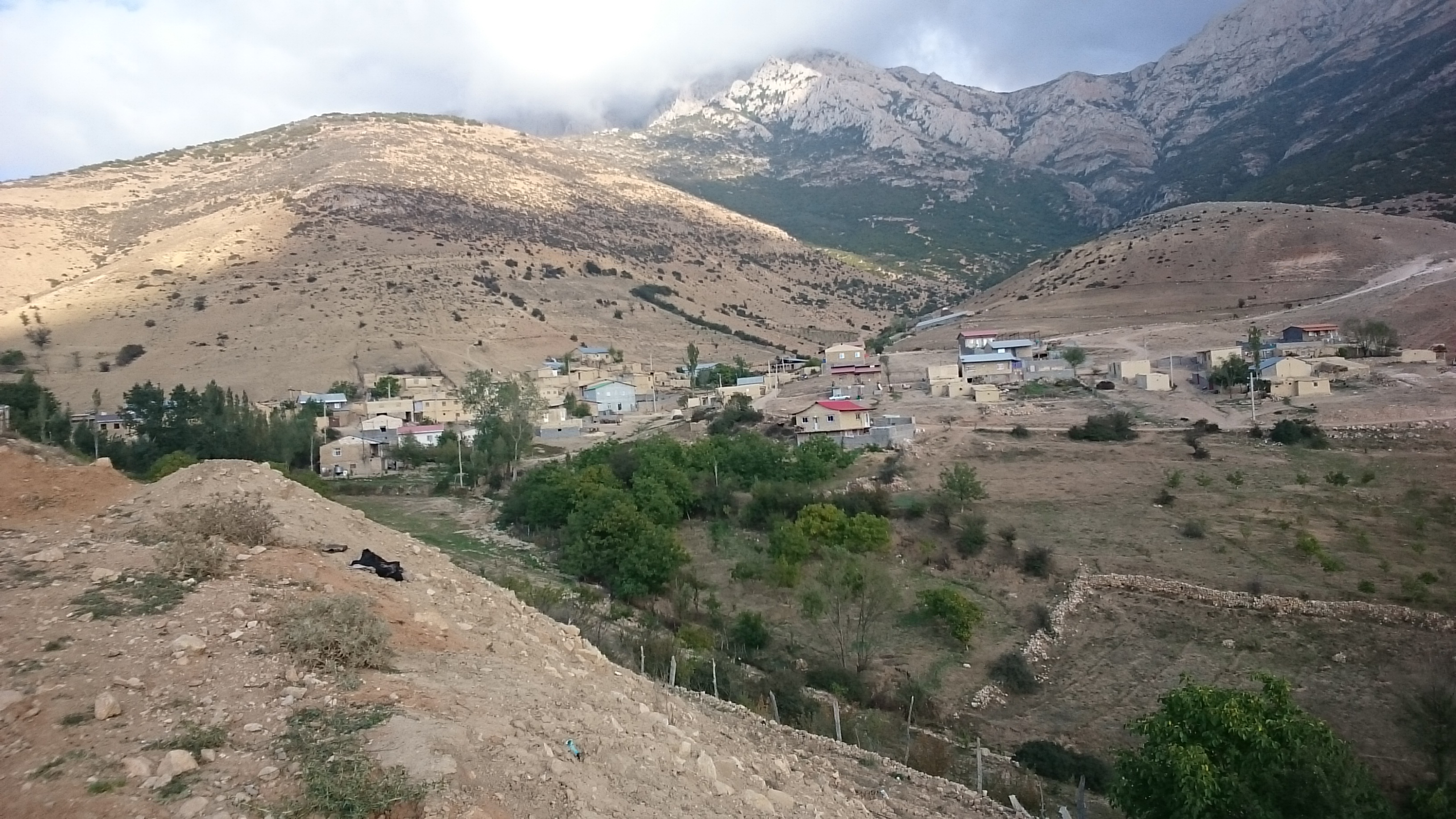
- The village of Mal Khast

- Location within Iran
- Coordinates: 36°19′44″N 53°52′09″E
- Country: Iran
- Province: Mazandaran
- County: Sari
- District: Chahardangeh
- Rural District: Poshtkuh

Population (2016)
  - Total: 339
- Time zone: UTC+3:30 (IRST)

Mal Khast (Persian: مال خاست) (Note: Also romanized as Māl Khāst; also known as Malkhas and Mālkhvāst) is a village in Poshtkuh Rural District of Chahardangeh District in Sari County, Mazandaran province, Iran.

== Demographics ==
=== Population ===
At the time of the 2006 National Census, the village's population was 332 in 81 households. The following census in 2011 counted 335 people in 101 households. The 2016 census measured the population of the village as 339 people in 107 households.
