= Poshtkuh Rural District (Sari County) =

Rural district in Mazandaran province, Iran

Poshtkuh Rural District Persian: دهستان پشتكوه
- Rural District
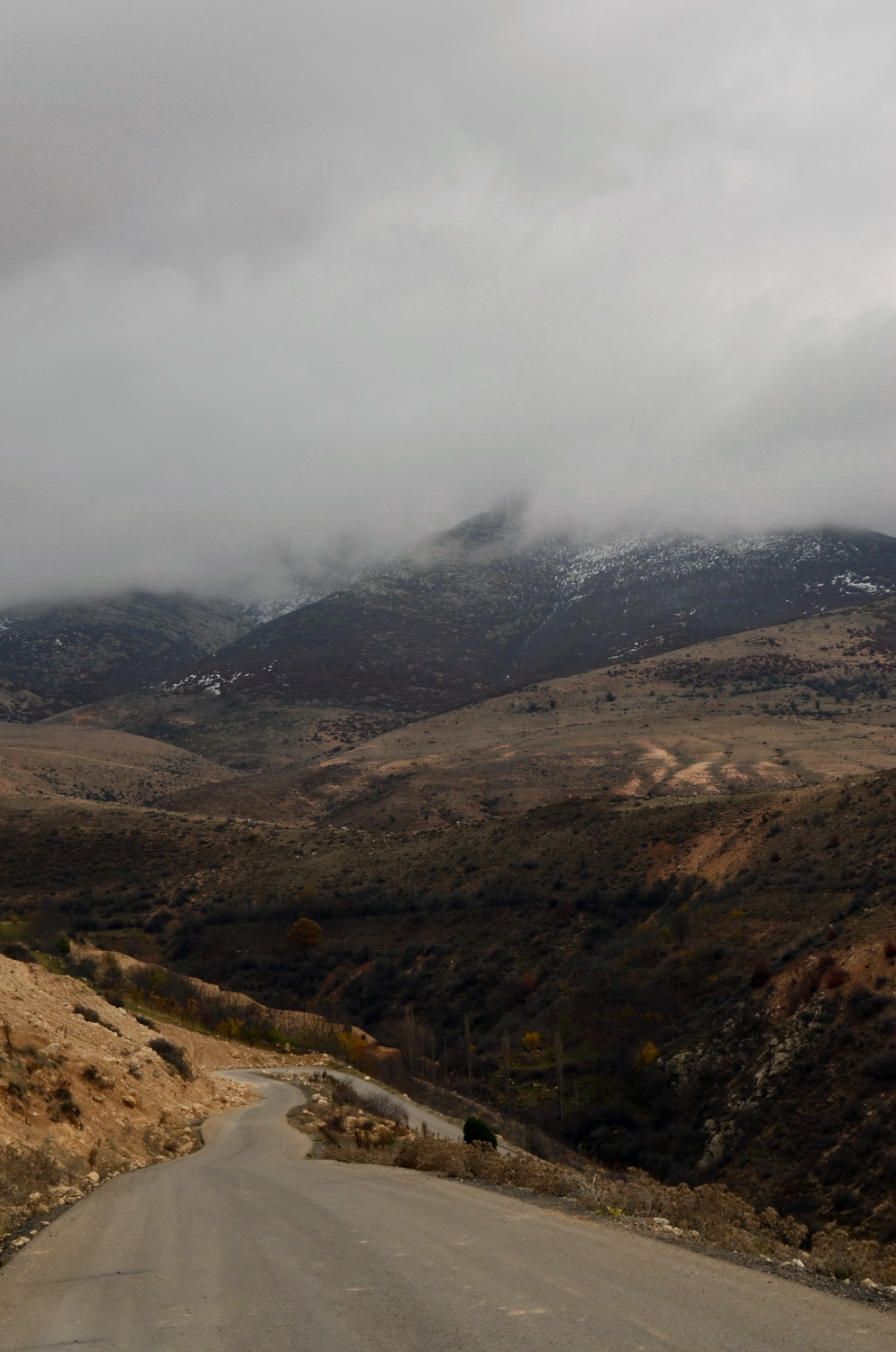
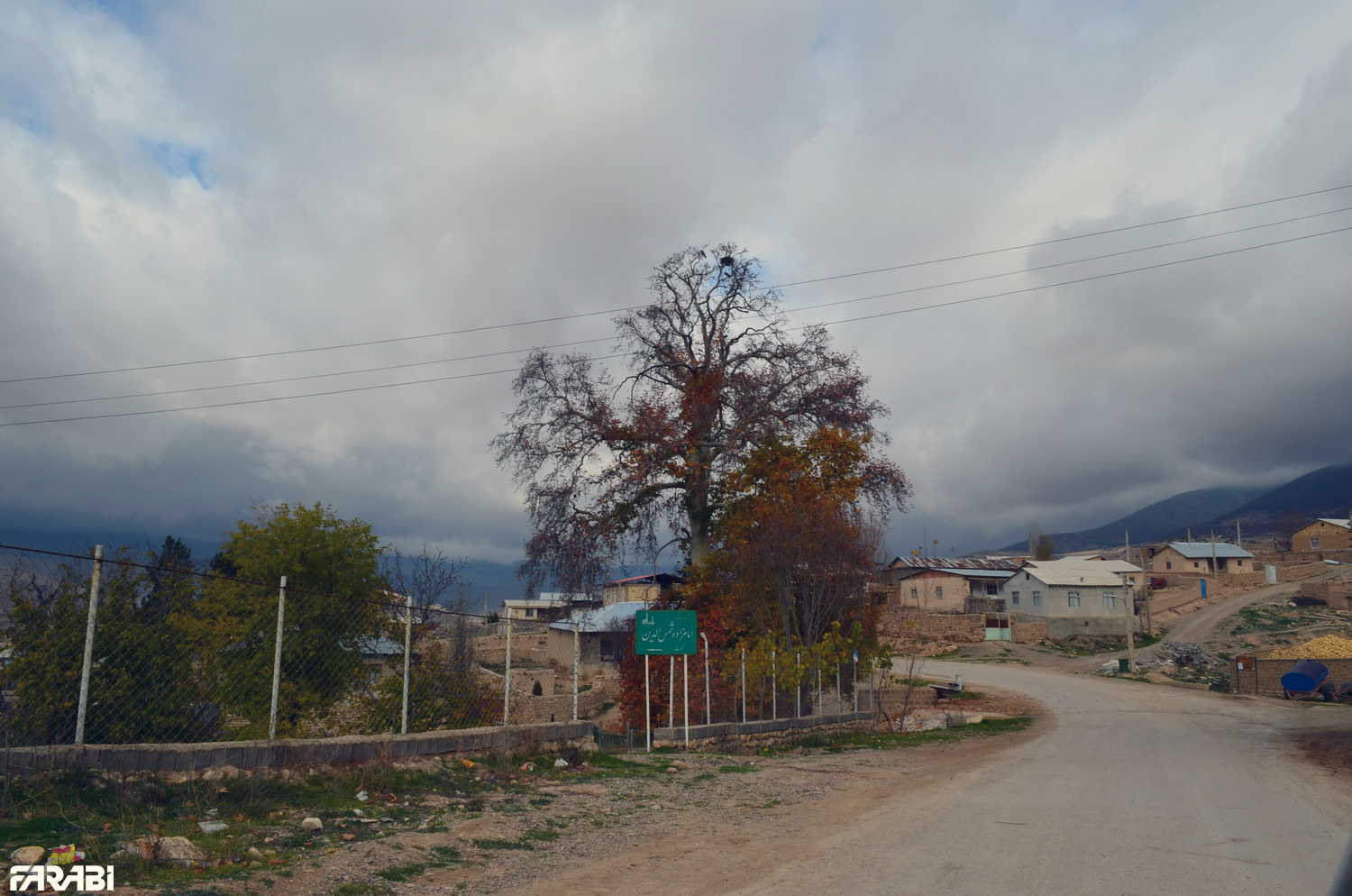
- Top to bottom: Road to the village of Mal Khast; the village of Kavat

- Location within Iran
- Coordinates: 36°15′N 53°48′E
- Country: Iran
- Province: Mazandaran
- County: Sari
- District: Chahardangeh
- Established: 1987
- Capital: Telma Darreh

Population (2016)
  - Total: 3,324
- Time zone: UTC+3:30 (IRST)

Poshtkuh Rural District (Persian: دهستان پشتكوه) is in Chahardangeh District of Sari County, Mazandaran province, Iran. Its capital is the village of Telma Darreh.

== Demographics ==
=== Population ===
At the time of the 2006 National Census, the rural district's population was 3,885 in 971 households. There were 3,345 inhabitants in 1,051 households at the following census of 2011. The 2016 census measured the population of the rural district as 3,324 in 1,170 households. The most populous of its 21 villages was Orost, with 709 people.

=== Other villages in the rural district ===
- Ali Kola
- Ara
- Bard
- Ivel
- Kalkenar
- Kavat
- Kord Mir
- Mal Khast
- Peshert
- Qaleh Sar
- Rudbar-e Telma Darreh
- Shaban Kheyl
- Valuyeh-ye Olya
- Valuyeh-ye Sofla
