= Orost, Mazandaran =

Village in Mazandaran province, Iran

Orost Persian: ارست
- Village
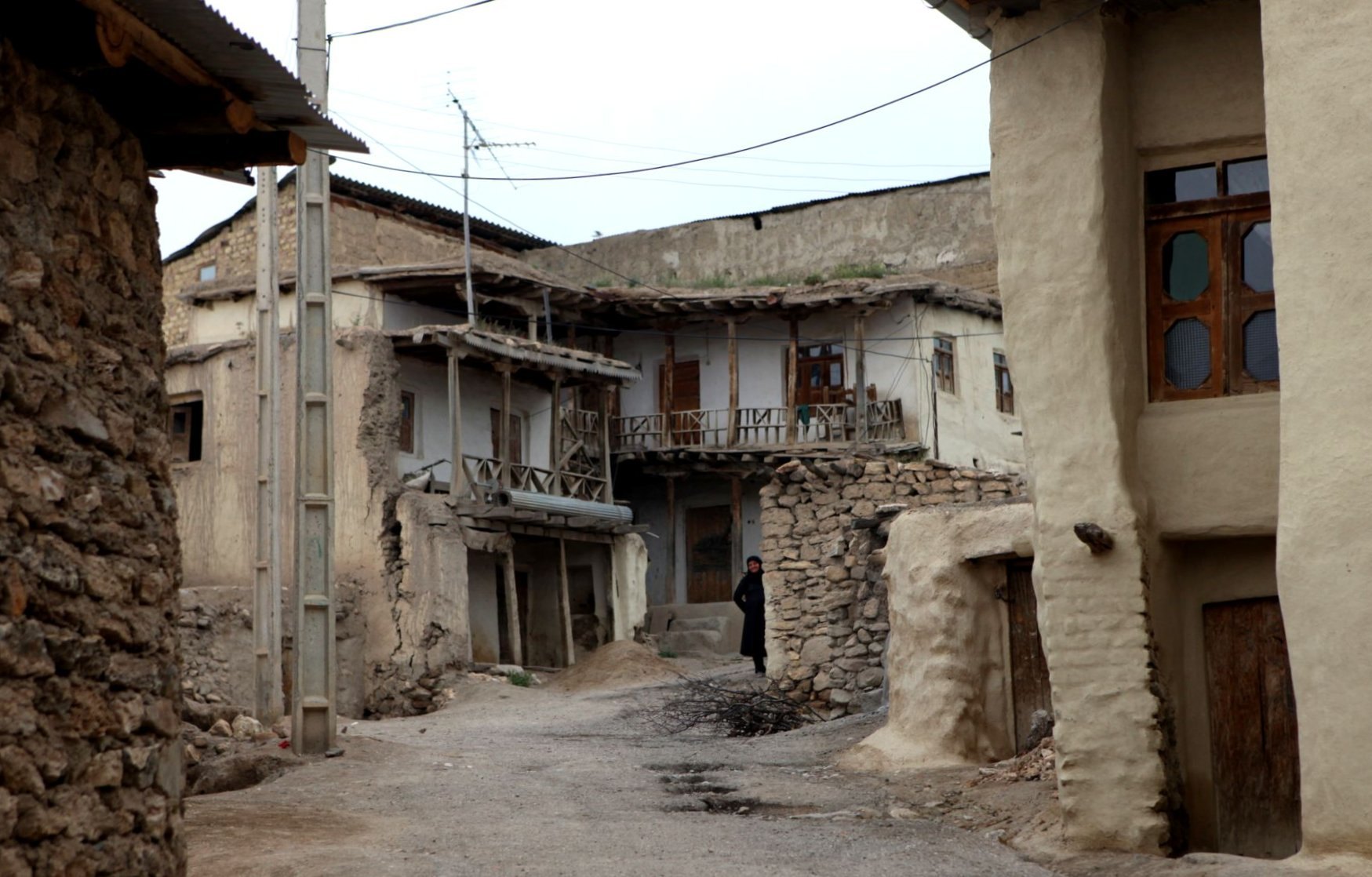
- The village of Orost

- Location within Iran
- Coordinates: 36°20′06″N 53°49′05″E
- Country: Iran
- Province: Mazandaran
- County: Sari
- District: Chahardangeh
- Rural District: Poshtkuh

Population (2016)
  - Total: 709
- Time zone: UTC+3:30 (IRST)

Orost (Persian: ارست) (Note: Also known as Owrost) is a village in Poshtkuh Rural District of Chahardangeh District in Sari County, Mazandaran province, Iran. Grain such as wheat and barley, dairy, and handicrafts are the products of the village.

== Demographics ==
=== Language and religion ===
The people of Orost speak Mazandarani and Persian and are Shia Muslim.

=== Population ===
Orost population history
Year	Pop.	±%
1950	500	—
1956	428	−14.4%
1966	490	+14.5%
1976	634	+29.4%
1986	909	+43.4%
2006	895	−1.5%
2011	555	−38.0%
2016	709	+27.7%

At the 1966 census, Orost was in Surtchi Rural District, with a population of 490 people in 90 households. The facilities of the village at that time consisted of a mosque, a shop and a cafe. Orost's land usage was 600 ha (1,500 acres) of natural pasture and 500 ha (1,200 acres) of barren land.

In 1976 census, Orost had 634 people in 100 households. The village had a small police station, elementary school and flour mill. In 1986 its population increased to 909 people in 162 households, with access to tap water.

At the time of the 2006 National Census, the village's population was 895 in 222 households. The following census in 2011 counted 555 people in 174 households. The 2016 census measured the population of the village as 709 people in 236 households, the most populous in its rural district.

== Notable people ==
- Omid Alishah
