= Valuyeh-ye Sofla =

Valuyeh-ye Sofla ولویه سفلی
- Village
- Location within Iran
- Coordinates: 36°12′35″N 53°43′27″E
- Country: Iran
- Province: Mazandaran
- County: Sari
- Bakhsh: Chahardangeh
- Rural District: Poshtkuh

Population (2016)
  - Total: 110
- Time zone: UTC+3:30 (IRST)

Valuyeh-ye Sofla (Persian: ولويه سفلی, also romanized as Valūyeh-ye Soflá; also known as Valūyeh-ye Pā’īn, Volūyeh, and Volūyeh Pā’īn) is a village in Poshtkuh Rural District, Chahardangeh District, Sari County, Mazandaran Province, Iran. At the 2016 census, its population was 110, in 28 families. Up from 80 people and 24 families in 2006.
