= Ivel, Iran =

Ivel ايول
- Village
- Location within Iran
- Coordinates: 36°14′27″N 53°40′42″E
- Country: Iran
- Province: Mazandaran
- County: Sari
- Bakhsh: Chahardangeh
- Rural District: Poshtkuh

Population (2016)
  - Total: 134
- Time zone: UTC+3:30 (IRST)

Ivel (Persian: ايول, also Romanized as Īvel; also known as Īdel) is a village in Poshtkuh Rural District, Chahardangeh District, Sari County, Mazandaran Province, Iran. At the 2006 census, its population was 137, in 49 families. In 2016, its population was 134, in 54 households.
