= Valuyeh-ye Olya =

Valuyan-ye Olya ولويه عليا
- Village
- Location within Iran
- Coordinates: 36°12′36″N 53°42′51″E
- Country: Iran
- Province: Mazandaran
- County: Sari
- Bakhsh: Chahardangeh
- Rural District: Poshtkuh

Population (2016)
  - Total: 72
- Time zone: UTC+3:30 (IRST)

Valuyeh-ye Olya (Persian: ولويه عليا, also Romanized as Valūyeh-ye ‘Olyā; also known as Valūyeh-ye Bālā) is a village in Poshtkuh Rural District, Chahardangeh District, Sari County, Mazandaran Province, Iran. At the 2016 census, its population was 72, in 35 families. Down from 114 people in 2006.
