= Valaghuz, Golestan =

Neighborhood in Golestan province, Iran

Valaghuz Persian: ولاغوز
- Neighborhood
- Location within Iran
- Coordinates: 36°46′59″N 54°05′44″E
- Country: Iran
- Province: Golestan
- County: Kordkuy
- District: Central
- City: Kordkuy

Population (2006)
  - Total: 5,376
- Time zone: UTC+3:30 (IRST)

Valaghuz (Persian: ولاغوز) (Note: Also romanized as Valāghūz; also known as Lāghūz and formerly known as Shirdar Bon) is a neighborhood in the city of Kordkuy in the Central District of Kordkuy County, Golestan province, Iran.

== Etymology ==
The village was formerly called Shirdar Bon in travelogues of domestic and foreign tourists, meaning "milky maple tree." It is said by the elders of the neighborhood that in the past, walnut trees (jowzdar in the local dialect) were abundant in the area, and due to the shape of the walnut tree and its curvature and crookedness, the walnut tree was called aghuz, vale joz, valajoz, etc. Over time, with changes in words and sentences, it became established as Valaghuz.

== Demographics ==
=== Language ===
The dialect and language of the residents of the neighborhood is Mazandarani, and the Kordkuy region's dialect.

=== Population ===
At the time of the 2006 National Census, Valaghuz's population was 1,650 in 405 households, when it was a village in Chaharkuh Rural District. After the census, the village was annexed by the city of Kordkuy. According to the statistics from the health house of Valaghuz in 2013, the population was 8,000 people in 1,800 households.
