= Chahar Deh, Golestan =

Village in Golestan province, Iran

Chahar Deh Persian: چهارده
- Village
- Location within Iran
- Coordinates: 36°47′48″N 54°10′51″E
- Country: Iran
- Province: Golestan
- County: Kordkuy
- District: Central
- Rural District: Sadan Rostaq-e Gharbi

Population (2016)
  - Total: 1,929
- Time zone: UTC+3:30 (IRST)

Chahar Deh (Persian: چهارده) (Note: Also romanized as Chahār Deh) is a village in, and the capital of, Sadan Rostaq-e Gharbi Rural District in the Central District of Kordkuy County, Golestan province, Iran.

== Demographics ==
=== Population ===
At the time of the 2006 National Census, the village's population was 2,262 in 611 households. The following census in 2011 counted 2,074 people in 656 households. The 2016 census measured the population of the village as 1,929 people in 668 households.
