= Chaman Saver =

Village in Golestan province, Iran

Chaman Saver Persian: چمن ساور
- Village
- Location within Iran
- Coordinates: 36°34′42″N 54°12′10″E
- Country: Iran
- Province: Golestan
- County: Kordkuy
- District: Central
- Rural District: Chaharkuh

Population (2016)
  - Total: 83
- Time zone: UTC+3:30 (IRST)

Chaman Saver (Persian: چمن ساور) (Note: Also romanized as Chaman Sāver) is a village in Chaharkuh Rural District in the Central District of Kordkuy County, Golestan province, Iran.

== Demographics ==
=== Population ===
At the time of the 2006 National Census, the village's population was 135 in 39 households. The following census in 2011 counted 82 people in 24 households. The 2016 census measured the population of the village as 83 people in 28 households.
