= Kond Ab =

Village in Golestan province, Iran

Kond Ab Persian: كنداب
- Village
- Location within Iran
- Coordinates: 36°38′54″N 54°03′50″E
- Country: Iran
- Province: Golestan
- County: Kordkuy
- District: Central
- Rural District: Chaharkuh

Population (2016)
  - Total: 222
- Time zone: UTC+3:30 (IRST)

Kond Ab (Persian: كنداب) (Note: Also romanized as Kond Āb; also known as Gandāb) is a village in Chaharkuh Rural District in the Central District of Kordkuy County, Golestan province, Iran.

== Demographics ==
=== Population ===
At the time of the 2006 National Census, the village's population was 374 in 83 households. The following census in 2011 counted 71 people in 19 households. The 2016 census measured the population of the village as 222 people in 73 households.
