= Gholamabad, Golestan =

Village in Golestan province, Iran

Gholamabad Persian: غلام اباد
- Village
- Location within Iran
- Coordinates: 36°51′30″N 54°12′35″E
- Country: Iran
- Province: Golestan
- County: Kordkuy
- District: Central
- Rural District: Sadan Rostaq-e Sharqi

Population (2016)
  - Total: 189
- Time zone: UTC+3:30 (IRST)

Gholamabad (Persian: غلام اباد) (Note: Also romanized as Gholāmābād) is a village in Sadan Rostaq-e Sharqi Rural District of the Central District in Kordkuy County, Golestan province, Iran.

== Demographics ==
=== Population ===
At the time of the 2006 National Census, the village's population was 265 in 71 households. The following census in 2011 counted 241 people in 61 households. The 2016 census measured the population of the village as 189 people in 58 households.
