= Valaghuz =

Valaghuz (Persian: ولاغوز) may refer to:

- Valaghuz, Golestan
- Valaghuz, Mazandaran
