= Naman, Golestan =

Village in Golestan province, Iran

Naman Persian: نامن
- Village
- Location within Iran
- Coordinates: 36°46′49″N 54°14′53″E
- Country: Iran
- Province: Golestan
- County: Kordkuy
- District: Central
- Rural District: Sadan Rostaq-e Sharqi

Population (2016)
  - Total: 887
- Time zone: UTC+3:30 (IRST)

Naman (Persian: نامن) (Note: Also romanized as Nāman) is a village in Sadan Rostaq-e Sharqi Rural District of the Central District in Kordkuy County, Golestan province, Iran.

== Demographics ==
=== Population ===
At the time of the 2006 National Census, the village's population was 951 in 208 households. The following census in 2011 counted 994 people in 287 households. The 2016 census measured the population of the village as 887 people in 286 households.
