= Hajjiabad, Kordkuy =

Village in Golestan province, Iran

Hajjiabad Persian: حاجی آباد
- Village
- Location within Iran
- Coordinates: 36°50′11″N 54°05′50″E
- Country: Iran
- Province: Golestan
- County: Kordkuy
- District: Central
- Rural District: Chaharkuh

Population (2016)
  - Total: 435
- Time zone: UTC+3:30 (IRST)

Hajjiabad (Persian: حاجی آباد) (Note: Also romanized as Ḩājīābād and Ḩājjīābād; also known as Hajjiabad-e Dasht) is a village in Chaharkuh Rural District in the Central District of Kordkuy County, Golestan province, Iran.

== Demographics ==
=== Population ===
At the time of the 2006 National Census, the village's population was 295 in 66 households. The following census in 2011 counted 377 people in 97 households. The 2016 census measured the population of the village as 435 people in 121 households.
