= Do Rud Mahalleh =

Village in Golestan province, Iran

Do Rud Mahalleh Persian: درودمحله
- Village
- Location within Iran
- Coordinates: 36°48′27″N 54°15′28″E
- Country: Iran
- Province: Golestan
- County: Kordkuy
- District: Central
- Rural District: Sadan Rostaq-e Sharqi

Population (2016)
  - Total: 207
- Time zone: UTC+3:30 (IRST)

Do Rud Mahalleh (Persian: درودمحله) (Note: Also romanized as Do Rūd Maḩalleh and Dowrūd Maḩalleh; also known as Dar Do Maḩalleh) is a village in Sadan Rostaq-e Sharqi Rural District of the Central District in Kordkuy County, Golestan province, Iran.

== Demographics ==
=== Population ===
At the time of the 2006 National Census, the village's population was 269 in 64 households. The following census in 2011 counted 240 people in 71 households. The 2016 census measured the population of the village as 207 people in 71 households.
