= Karimabad, Kordkuy =

Village in Golestan province, Iran

Karimabad Persian: کريم آباد
- Village
- Country: Iran
- Province: Golestan
- County: Kordkuy
- District: Central
- Rural District: Sadan Rostaq-e Gharbi

Population (2016)
  - Total: 53
- Time zone: UTC+3:30 (IRST)

Karimabad (Persian: کريم آباد) (Note: Also romanized as Karīmābād; also known as Sheykh Karīm (شيخ کريم)) is a village in Sadan Rostaq-e Gharbi Rural District of the Central District in Kordkuy County, Golestan province, Iran.

== Demographics ==
=== Population ===
At the time of the 2006 National Census, the village's population was 73 in 20 households. The following census in 2011 counted 59 people in 21 households. The 2016 census measured the population of the village as 53 people in 19 households.
