= Sadan Rostaq =

Sadan Rostaq (Persian: سدن رستاق) may refer to:

- Sadan Rostaq-e Gharbi Rural District
- Sadan Rostaq-e Sharqi Rural District
