= Yazdan Mahalleh =

Village in Golestan province, Iran

Yazdan Mahalleh Persian: يزدان محله
- Village
- Location within Iran
- Coordinates: 36°40′07″N 54°07′40″E
- Country: Iran
- Province: Golestan
- County: Kordkuy
- District: Central
- Rural District: Chaharkuh

Population (2016)
  - Total: Below reporting threshold
- Time zone: UTC+3:30 (IRST)

Yazdan-e Mahalleh (Persian: يزدان محله) (Note: Also romanized as Yazdan-e Mahallah, Yazdān-e Maḩallah, and Yazdān-e Maḩalleh) is a village in Chaharkuh Rural District in the Central District of Kordkuy County, Golestan province, Iran.

== Demographics ==
=== Population ===
At the time of the 2006 National Census, the village's population was 87 in 36 households. The following census in 2011 counted 38 people in 12 households. The 2016 census measured the population of the village as below the reporting threshold.
