= Eslamabad-e Shadeh =

Village in Golestan province, Iran

Eslamabad-e Shadeh Persian: اسلام ابادشاده
- Village
- Location within Iran
- Country: Iran
- Province: Golestan
- County: Kordkuy
- District: Central
- Rural District: Sadan Rostaq-e Sharqi

Population (2016)
  - Total: 497
- Time zone: UTC+3:30 (IRST)

Eslamabad-e Shadeh (Persian: اسلام ابادشاده) (Note: Also romanized as Eslāmābād-e Shādeh; also known as Eslāmābād) is a village in Sadan Rostaq-e Sharqi Rural District of the Central District in Kordkuy County, Golestan province, Iran.

== Demographics ==
=== Population ===
At the time of the 2006 National Census, the village's population was 541 in 142 households. The following census in 2011 counted 569 people in 165 households. The 2016 census measured the population of the village as 497 people in 175 households.
