= Miandarreh, Golestan =

Village in Golestan province, Iran

Miandarreh Persian: مياندره
- Village
- Location within Iran
- Coordinates: 36°46′45″N 54°13′34″E
- Country: Iran
- Province: Golestan
- County: Kordkuy
- District: Central
- Rural District: Sadan Rostaq-e Sharqi

Population (2016)
  - Total: 1,589
- Time zone: UTC+3:30 (IRST)

Miandarreh (Persian: مياندره) (Note: Also romanized as Meyān Darreh and Mīāndarreh) is a village in Sadan Rostaq-e Sharqi Rural District of the Central District in Kordkuy County, Golestan province, Iran.

== Demographics ==
=== Population ===
At the time of the 2006 National Census, the village's population was 1,648 in 409 households. The following census in 2011 counted 1,617 people in 474 households. The 2016 census measured the population of the village as 1,589 people in 519 households.
