= Dangelan =

Village in Golestan province, Iran

Dangelan Persian: دنگلان خواجه
- Village
- Location within Iran
- Coordinates: 36°47′59″N 54°14′19″E
- Country: Iran
- Province: Golestan
- County: Kordkuy
- District: Central
- Rural District: Sadan Rostaq-e Sharqi

Population (2016)
  - Total: 2,601
- Time zone: UTC+3:30 (IRST)

Dangelan (Persian: دنگلان) (Note: Also romanized as Dangalān and Dangelān; formerly known as Dangelan Khvajeh (دنگلان خواجه), also romanized as Dangelān Khvājeh) is a village in Sadan Rostaq-e Sharqi Rural District of the Central District in Kordkuy County, Golestan province, Iran.

== Demographics ==
=== Population ===
At the time of the 2006 National Census, the village's population, as Dangelan Khvajeh, was 2,692 in 677 households. The following census in 2011 counted 2,717 people in 803 households, by which time the village was listed as Dangelan. The 2016 census measured the population of the village as 2,601 people in 860 households.
