= Cheqer, Kordkuy =

Village in Golestan province, Iran

Cheqer Persian: چقر
- Village
- Location within Iran
- Coordinates: 36°46′02″N 54°14′02″E
- Country: Iran
- Province: Golestan
- County: Kordkuy
- District: Central
- Rural District: Sadan Rostaq-e Sharqi

Population (2016)
  - Total: 86
- Time zone: UTC+3:30 (IRST)

Cheqer (Persian: چقر) is a village in Sadan Rostaq-e Sharqi Rural District of the Central District in Kordkuy County, Golestan province, Iran.

== Demographics ==
=== Population ===
At the time of the 2006 National Census, the village's population was 128 in 34 households. The following census in 2011 counted 100 people in 29 households. The 2016 census measured the population of the village as 86 people in 33 households.
