= Ilvar =

Ilvar (Persian: ايلوار) may refer to:

- Ilvar-e Yek Dangeh
- Ilvar-e Panj Dangeh
