= Mofidabad =

Village in Golestan province, Iran

Mofidabad Persian: مفيدآباد
- Village
- Location within Iran
- Coordinates: 36°48′33″N 54°13′23″E
- Country: Iran
- Province: Golestan
- County: Kordkuy
- District: Central
- Rural District: Sadan Rostaq-e Sharqi

Population (2016)
  - Total: 379
- Time zone: UTC+3:30 (IRST)

Mofidabad (Persian: مفيدآباد) (Note: Also romanized as Mofīdābād) is a village in Sadan Rostaq-e Sharqi Rural District of the Central District in Kordkuy County, Golestan province, Iran.

== Demographics ==
=== Population ===
At the time of the 2006 National Census, the village's population was 338 in 91 households. The following census in 2011 counted 347 people in 108 households. The 2016 census measured the population of the village as 379 people in 126 households.
