= Badilabad =

Village in Golestan province, Iran

Badilabad Persian: بديل اباد
- Village
- Location within Iran
- Coordinates: 36°50′11″N 54°08′13″E
- Country: Iran
- Province: Golestan
- County: Kordkuy
- District: Central
- Rural District: Sadan Rostaq-e Gharbi

Population (2016)
  - Total: 0
- Time zone: UTC+3:30 (IRST)

Badilabad (Persian: بديل اباد) (Note: Also romanized as Badīlābād) is a village in Sadan Rostaq-e Gharbi Rural District of the Central District in Kordkuy County, Golestan province, Iran.

== Demographics ==
=== Population ===
At the time of the 2006 National Census, the village's population was 29 in nine households. The following census in 2011 counted 14 people in six households. The 2016 census measured the population of the village as zero.
