= Khorramabad, Golestan =

Village in Golestan province, Iran

Khorramabad Persian: خرم اباد
- Village
- Location within Iran
- Coordinates: 36°46′23″N 54°13′09″E
- Country: Iran
- Province: Golestan
- County: Kordkuy
- District: Central
- Rural District: Sadan Rostaq-e Gharbi

Population (2016)
  - Total: 245
- Time zone: UTC+3:30 (IRST)

Khorramabad (Persian: خرم اباد) (Note: Also romanized as Khorramābād; also known as Kharābeh Masjed) is a village in Sadan Rostaq-e Gharbi Rural District of the Central District in Kordkuy County, Golestan province, Iran.

== Demographics ==
=== Population ===
At the time of the 2006 National Census, the village's population was 277 in 72 households. The following census in 2011 counted 272 people in 82 households. The 2016 census measured the population of the village as 245 people in 89 households.
