= Yesaqi, Golestan =

Village in Golestan province, Iran

Yesaqi Persian: يساقي
- Village
- Location within Iran
- Coordinates: 36°49′44″N 54°14′30″E
- Country: Iran
- Province: Golestan
- County: Kordkuy
- District: Central
- Rural District: Sadan Rostaq-e Sharqi

Population (2016)
  - Total: 4,093
- Time zone: UTC+3:30 (IRST)

Yesaqi (Persian: يساقي) (Note: Also romanized as Yesāqī) is a village in, and the capital of, Sadan Rostaq-e Sharqi Rural District in the Central District of Kordkuy County, Golestan province, Iran.

== Demographics ==
=== Population ===
At the time of the 2006 National Census, the village's population was 4,490 in 1,150 households. The following census in 2011 counted 4,308 people in 1,322 households. The 2016 census measured the population of the village as 4,093 people in 1,378 households. It was the most populous village in its rural district.
