= Sali Kandeh =

Village in Golestan province, Iran

Sali Kandeh Persian: سالی كنده
- Village
- Location within Iran
- Coordinates: 36°46′20″N 54°04′37″E
- Country: Iran
- Province: Golestan
- County: Kordkuy
- District: Central
- Rural District: Chaharkuh

Population (2016)
  - Total: 1,623
- Time zone: UTC+3:30 (IRST)

Sali Kandeh (Persian: سالی كنده) (Note: Also romanized as Sālī Kandeh) is a village in Chaharkuh Rural District in the Central District of Kordkuy County, Golestan province, Iran.

== Demographics ==
=== Population ===
At the time of the 2006 National Census, the village's population was 1,650 in 405 households. The following census in 2011 counted 1,638 people in 479 households. The 2016 census measured the population of the village as 1,623 people in 539 households.
