= Radkan, Golestan =

Village in Golestan province, Iran

Radkan Persian: رادكان
- Village
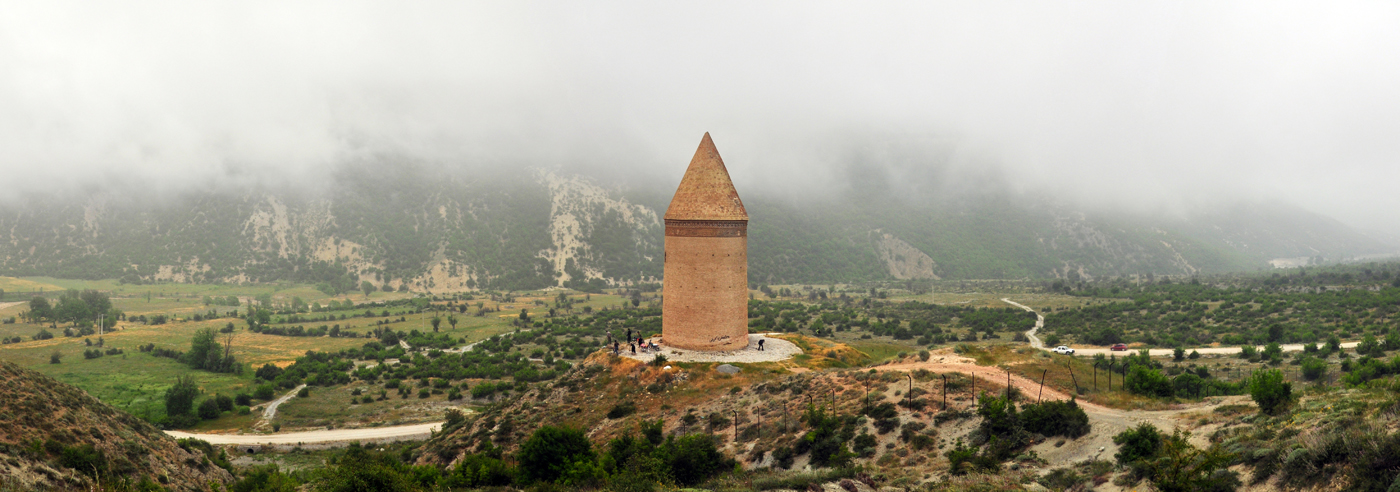
- Radkan Tower

- Location within Iran
- Coordinates: 36°38′32″N 54°05′47″E
- Country: Iran
- Province: Golestan
- County: Kordkuy
- District: Central
- Rural District: Chaharkuh

Population (2016)
  - Total: 235
- Time zone: UTC+3:30 (IRST)

Radkan (Persian: رادكان) (Note: Also romanized as Rādekān and Rādkān; also known as Rādkān Bār Kalā) is a village in Chaharkuh Rural District in the Central District of Kordkuy County, Golestan province, Iran.

== Demographics ==
=== Population ===
At the time of the 2006 National Census, the village's population was 323 in 74 households. The following census in 2011 counted 100 people in 31 households. The 2016 census measured the population of the village as 235 people in 66 households.
