= Varnam (disambiguation) =

Varnam is a type of composition in the Carnatic music system.

Varnam may also refer to:

- Varnam (1989 film), an Indian Malayalam-language film
- Varnam (2011 film), an Indian Tamil-language film
- Varnam (company), social enterprise in India
- Varnam, Iran (disambiguation), settlements in Iran

== See also ==
- Varna (disambiguation)
