= Hajjiabad-e Kuh Payeh =

Village in Golestan province, Iran

Hajjiabad-e Kuh Payeh Persian: حاجی آباد كوهپايه
- Village
- Location within Iran
- Coordinates: 36°37′40″N 54°19′42″E
- Country: Iran
- Province: Golestan
- County: Kordkuy
- District: Central
- Rural District: Chaharkuh

Population (2016)
  - Total: 309
- Time zone: UTC+3:30 (IRST)

Hajjiabad-e Kuh Payeh (Persian: حاجی آباد كوهپايه) (Note: Also romanized as Ḩājjīābād-e Kūh Pāyeh) is a village in Chaharkuh Rural District in the Central District of Kordkuy County, Golestan province, Iran.

== Demographics ==
=== Population ===
At the time of the 2006 National Census, the village's population was 230 in 64 households. The following census in 2011 counted 168 people in 45 households. The 2016 census measured the population of the village as 309 people in 98 households.
