= Daraz-e Now =

Village in Golestan province, Iran

Daraz-e Now Persian: درازنو
- Village
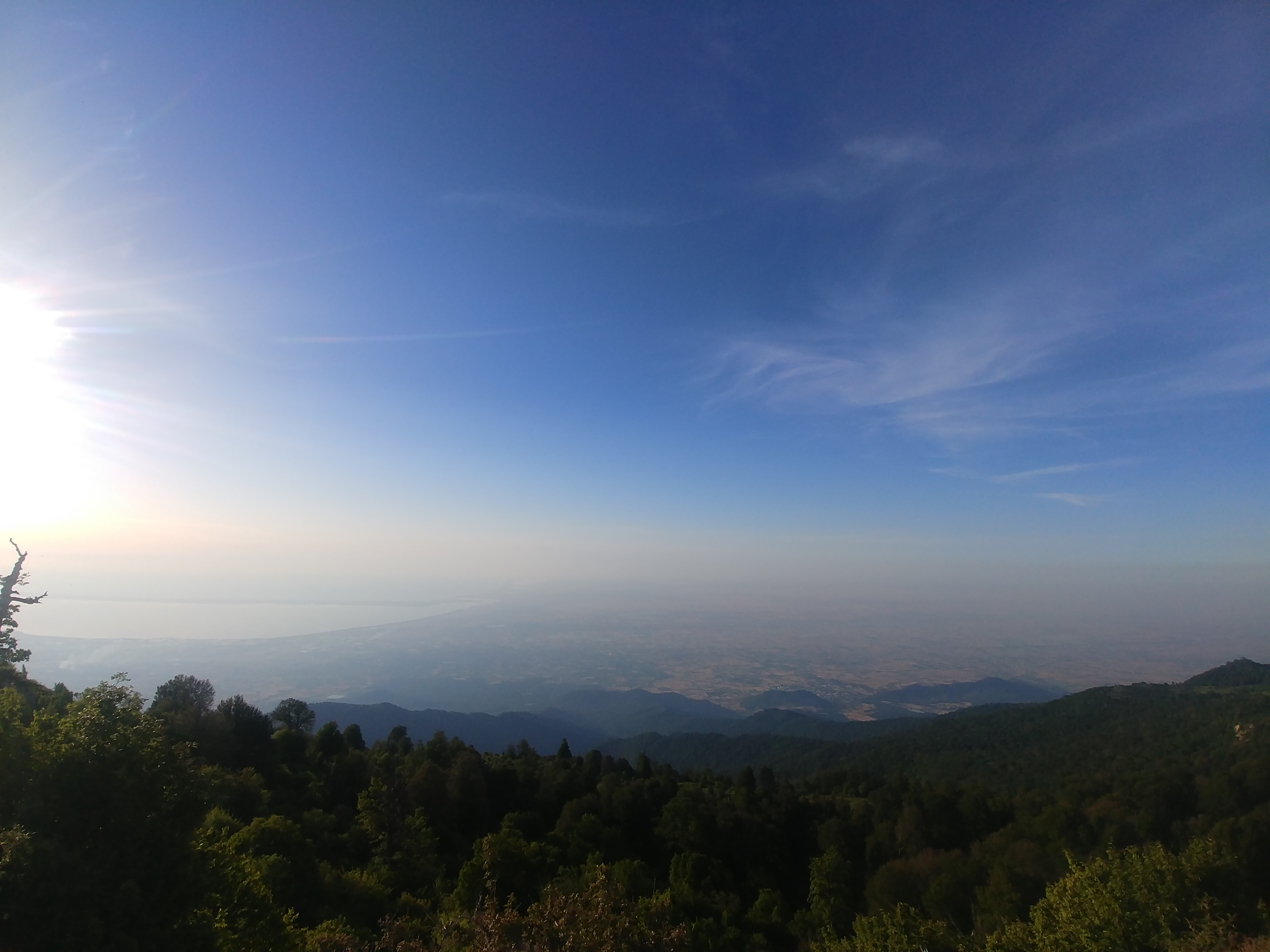
- The Gorgan Plain viewed from Derazno

- Location within Iran
- Coordinates: 36°40′08″N 54°08′51″E
- Country: Iran
- Province: Golestan
- County: Kordkuy
- District: Central
- Rural District: Chaharkuh

Population (2016)
  - Total: 23
- Time zone: UTC+3:30 (IRST)

Daraz-e Now (Persian: درازنو) (Note: Also romanized as Darāz-e Now and Derāz-e No) is a village in Chaharkuh Rural District in the Central District of Kordkuy County, Golestan province, Iran.

== Demographics ==
=== Population ===
At the time of the 2006 National Census, the village's population was 56 in 25 households. The following census in 2011 counted a population below the reporting threshold. The 2016 census measured the population of the village as 23 people in 10 households.
