= Bala Jaddeh =

Village in Golestan province, Iran

Bala Jaddeh Persian: بالاجاده
- Village
- Location within Iran
- Coordinates: 36°45′33″N 54°10′36″E
- Country: Iran
- Province: Golestan
- County: Kordkuy
- District: Central
- Rural District: Sadan Rostaq-e Gharbi

Population (2016)
  - Total: 3,604
- Time zone: UTC+3:30 (IRST)

Bala Jaddeh (Persian: بالاجاده) (Note: Also romanized as Bālā Jāddeh) is a village in Sadan Rostaq-e Gharbi Rural District of the Central District in Kordkuy County, Golestan province, Iran.

== Demographics ==
=== Population ===
At the time of the 2006 National Census, the village's population was 3,140 in 887 households. The following census in 2011 counted 2,925 people in 934 households. The 2016 census measured the population of the village as 3,604 people in 1,228 households. It was the most populous village in its rural district.
