= Qalandar Ayesh =

Village in Golestan province, Iran

Qalandar Ayesh Persian: قلندرايش
- Village
- Location within Iran
- Coordinates: 36°45′22″N 54°11′06″E
- Country: Iran
- Province: Golestan
- County: Kordkuy
- District: Central
- Rural District: Sadan Rostaq-e Gharbi

Population (2016)
  - Total: 204
- Time zone: UTC+3:30 (IRST)

Qalandar Ayesh (Persian: قلندرايش) (Note: Also romanized as Qalandar Āyesh) is a village in Sadan Rostaq-e Gharbi Rural District of the Central District in Kordkuy County, Golestan province, Iran.

== Demographics ==
=== Population ===
At the time of the 2006 National Census, the village's population was 277 in 76 households. The following census in 2011 counted 226 people in 74 households. The 2016 census measured the population of the village as 204 people in 77 households.
