= Sar Kalateh-ye Kharab Shahr =

Village in Golestan province, Iran

Sar Kalateh-ye Kharab Shahr Persian: سركلاته خراب شهر
- Village
- Location within Iran
- Coordinates: 36°44′11″N 54°04′06″E
- Country: Iran
- Province: Golestan
- County: Kordkuy
- District: Central
- Rural District: Chaharkuh

Population (2016)
  - Total: 2,680
- Time zone: UTC+3:30 (IRST)

Sar Kalateh-ye Kharab Shahr (Persian: سركلاته خراب شهر) (Note: Also romanized as Sar Kalāteh-ye Kharāb Shahr; also known as Sar Kalāteh) is a village in, and the capital of, Chaharkuh Rural District in the Central District of Kordkuy County, Golestan province, Iran.

== Demographics ==
=== Population ===
At the time of the 2006 National Census, the village's population was 3,060 in 769 households. The following census in 2011 counted 2,946 people in 895 households. The 2016 census measured the population of the village as 2,680 people in 889 households. It was the most populous village in its rural district.
