= Mehtar Kalateh =

Village in Golestan province, Iran

Mehtar Kalateh Persian: مهتركلاته
- Village
- Location within Iran
- Coordinates: 36°50′44″N 54°12′14″E
- Country: Iran
- Province: Golestan
- County: Kordkuy
- District: Central
- Rural District: Sadan Rostaq-e Sharqi

Population (2016)
  - Total: 3,080
- Time zone: UTC+3:30 (IRST)

Mehtar Kalateh (Persian: مهتركلاته) (Note: Also romanized as Mehtar Kalāteh) is a village in Sadan Rostaq-e Sharqi Rural District of the Central District in Kordkuy County, Golestan province, Iran.

== Demographics ==
=== Population ===
At the time of the 2006 National Census, the village's population was 2,829 in 736 households. The following census in 2011 counted 3,045 people in 915 households. The 2016 census measured the population of the village as 3,080 people in 1,011 households.
