= Jahan Nama =

Jahan Nama or Jahan Nema (Persian: جهان نما) may refer to:

- Jahan Nama, Fars
- Jahan Nama, Golestan
- Jahannama tower isfahan
