= Zera Mahalleh =

Village in Golestan province, Iran

Zera Mahalleh Persian: زراع محله
- Village
- Location within Iran
- Coordinates: 36°48′09″N 54°12′51″E
- Country: Iran
- Province: Golestan
- County: Kordkuy
- District: Central
- Rural District: Sadan Rostaq-e Sharqi

Population (2016)
  - Total: 279
- Time zone: UTC+3:30 (IRST)

Zera Mahalleh (Persian: زراع محله) (Note: Also romanized as Zerā‘ Maḩalleh and Zerā Maḩalleh) is a village in Sadan Rostaq-e Sharqi Rural District of the Central District in Kordkuy County, Golestan province, Iran.

== Demographics ==
=== Population ===
At the time of the 2006 National Census, the village's population was 348 in 88 households. The following census in 2011 counted 285 people in 89 households. The 2016 census measured the population of the village as 279 people in 106 households.
