= Alang, Iran =

Village in Golestan province, Iran

Alang Persian: النگ
- Village
- Location within Iran
- Coordinates: 36°48′11″N 54°09′01″E
- Country: Iran
- Province: Golestan
- County: Kordkuy
- District: Central
- Rural District: Sadan Rostaq-e Gharbi

Population (2016)
  - Total: 3,218
- Time zone: UTC+3:30 (IRST)

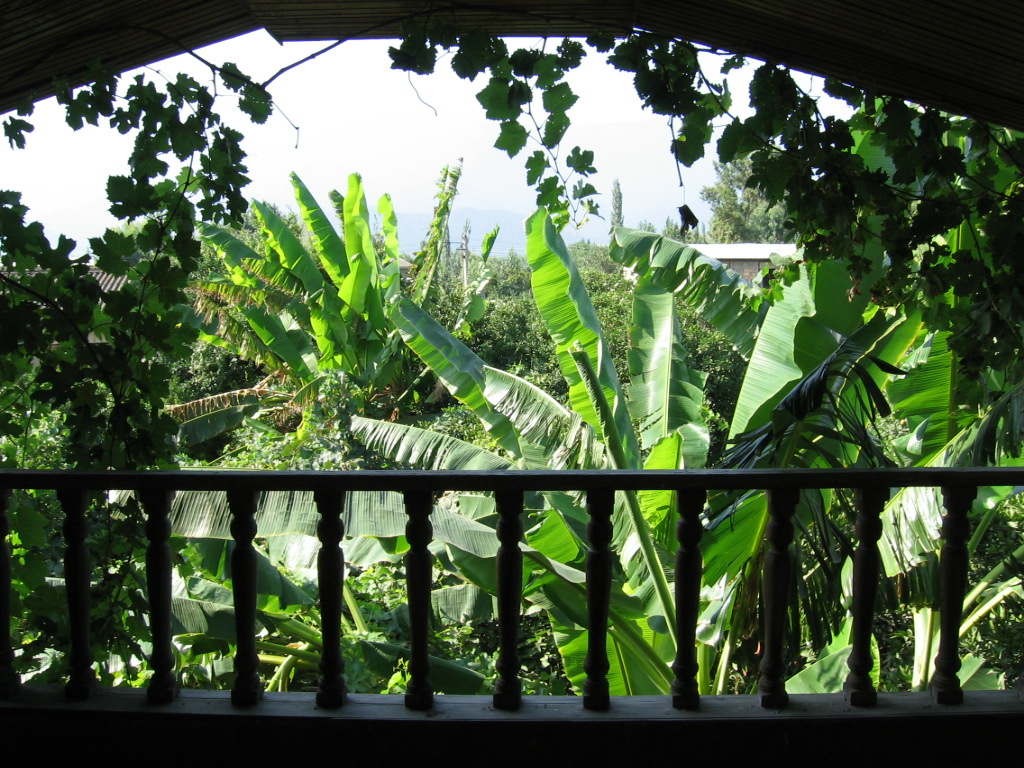
Alang’s greenery from a balcony.

Alang (Persian: النگ) (Note: Also romanized as Olang) is a village in Sadan Rostaq-e Gharbi Rural District of the Central District in Kordkuy County, Golestan province, Iran.

== Demographics ==
=== Population ===
At the time of the 2006 National Census, the village's population was 3,541 in 963 households. The following census in 2011 counted 3,721 people in 1,123 households. The 2016 census measured the population of the village as 3,218 people in 1,094 households.
