= Ilvar-e Panj Dangeh =

Village in Golestan province, Iran

Ilvar-e Panj Dangeh Persian: ايلوارپنجدانگه
- Village
- Location within Iran
- Coordinates: 36°47′48″N 54°11′37″E
- Country: Iran
- Province: Golestan
- County: Kordkuy
- District: Central
- Rural District: Sadan Rostaq-e Gharbi

Population (2016)
  - Total: 442
- Time zone: UTC+3:30 (IRST)

Ilvar-e Panj Dangeh (Persian: ايلوارپنجدانگه) (Note: Also romanized as Īlvār-e Panj Dāngeh) is a village in Sadan Rostaq-e Gharbi Rural District of the Central District in Kordkuy County, Golestan province, Iran.

== Demographics ==
=== Population ===
At the time of the 2006 National Census, the village's population was 442 in 119 households. The following census in 2011 counted 464 people in 143 households. The 2016 census measured the population of the village as 442 people in 156 households.
