= Gorji Mahalleh, Golestan =

Village in Golestan province, Iran

Gorji Mahalleh Persian: گرجي محله
- Village
- Location within Iran
- Coordinates: 36°49′00″N 54°13′26″E
- Country: Iran
- Province: Golestan
- County: Kordkuy
- District: Central
- Rural District: Sadan Rostaq-e Sharqi

Population (2016)
  - Total: 598
- Time zone: UTC+3:30 (IRST)

Gorji Mahalleh (Persian: گرجي محله) (Note: Also romanized as Gorjī Maḩalleh) is a village in Sadan Rostaq-e Sharqi Rural District of the Central District in Kordkuy County, Golestan province, Iran.

== Demographics ==
=== Population ===
At the time of the 2006 National Census, the village's population was 671 in 168 households. The following census in 2011 counted 680 people in 197 households. The 2016 census measured the population of the village as 598 people in 211 households.
