= Gorji Mahalleh =

Gorji Mahalleh (Persian: گرجي محله) may refer to:

- Gorji Mahalleh, Golestan
- Gorji Mahalleh, Mazandaran
