= Ilvar-e Yek Dangeh =

Village in Golestan province, Iran

Ilvar-e Yek Dangeh Persian: ايلواريكدانگه
- Village
- Location within Iran
- Coordinates: 36°47′36″N 54°11′33″E
- Country: Iran
- Province: Golestan
- County: Kordkuy
- District: Central
- Rural District: Sadan Rostaq-e Gharbi

Population (2016)
  - Total: 986
- Time zone: UTC+3:30 (IRST)

Ilvar-e Yek Dangeh (Persian: ايلواريكدانگه) (Note: Also romanized as Īlvār-e Yek Dāngeh) is a village in Sadan Rostaq-e Gharbi Rural District of the Central District in Kordkuy County, Golestan province, Iran.

== Demographics ==
=== Population ===
At the time of the 2006 National Census, the village's population was 1,124 in 315 households. The following census in 2011 counted 1,107 people in 356 households. The 2016 census measured the population of the village as 986 people in 359 households.
