= Lake Churat =

Lake in Mazandaran province, Iran

Churat Lake
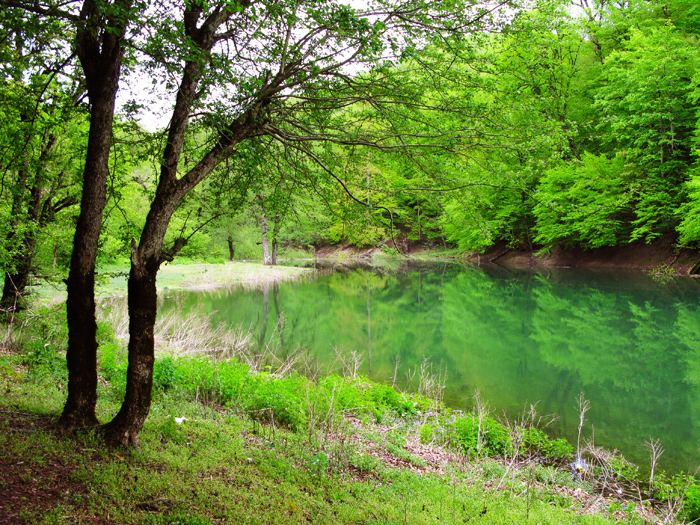
- Interactive map of Churat Lake
- Location: Sari County, Iran
- Coordinates: 36°22′22″N 53°30′04″E
- Type: Lake

Lake Churat, (Persian: دریاچه چورت), also known as Chort or Mianshe, is a freshwater lake located in Mazandaran province in northern Iran. It has an approximate area of 2.5 hectares (6.2 acres). The lake was formed due to an earthquake that occurred in 1939 AD, which led to the blockage of the course of a water spring.

== Etymology ==
The lake is known as Lake Churat due to its location in the village of Churet. Consequently, the lake takes its name from the village in which it is situated, although the local population refers to it as Lake Mianshe. The GEOnet Names Server of the United States federal government's National Geospatial-Intelligence Agency calls the lake Daryācheh-ye Mīvan Sheh.

== Formation ==
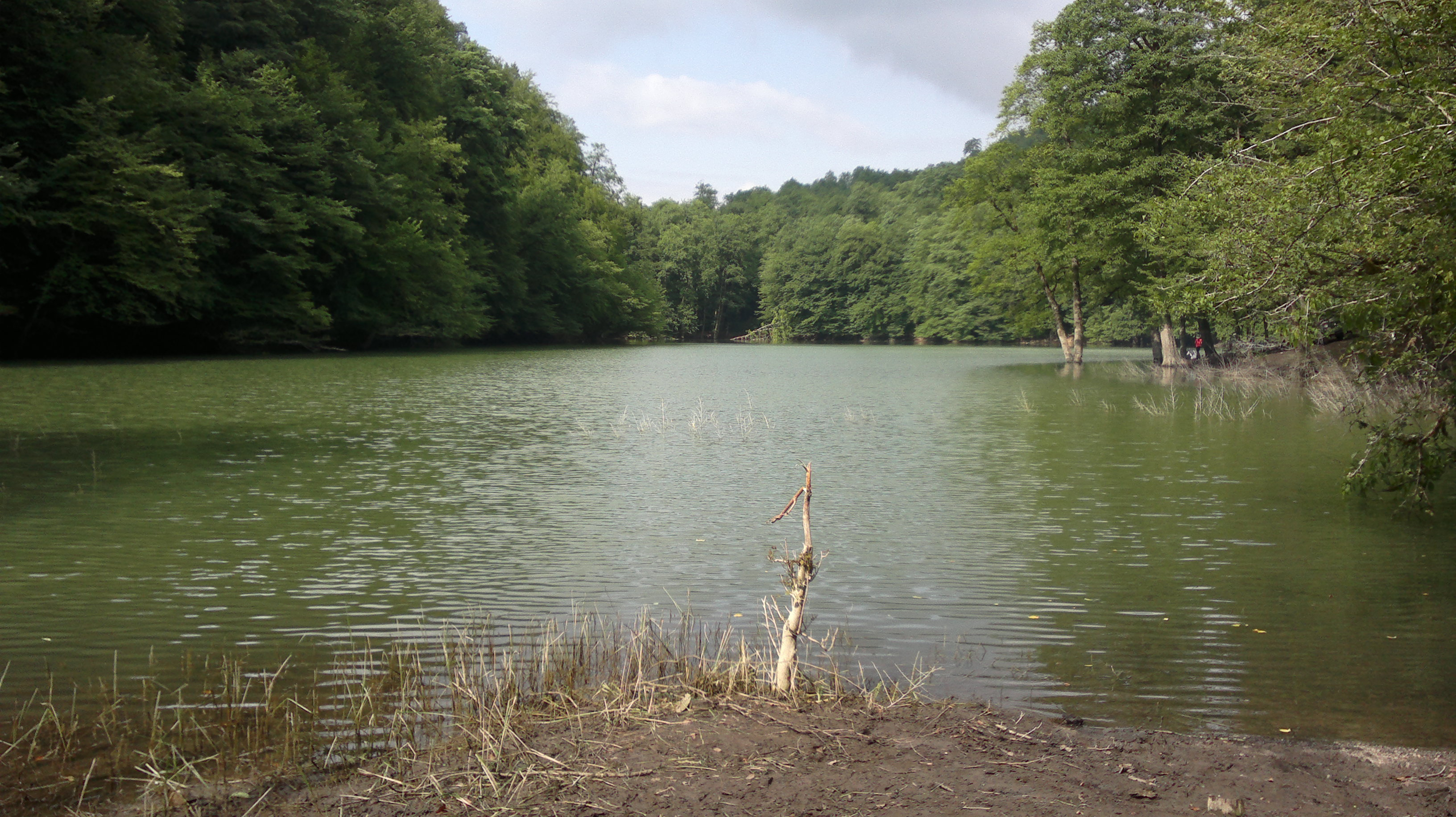
Churat freshwater lake

Lake Churat is considered one of the most recent lakes to form. This was due to a 1939 earthquake, in which the soil collapsed and the water flow was cut off. As a result, water is constantly collecting and flowing into the lake.

== Location ==
Lake Churat is situated 10 kilometers from the village of Churat in Sari county, which serves as the center of Mazandaran province and offers a view of the Caspian Sea. The Iranian capital, Tehran, is situated approximately two hours drive from Mazandaran province.

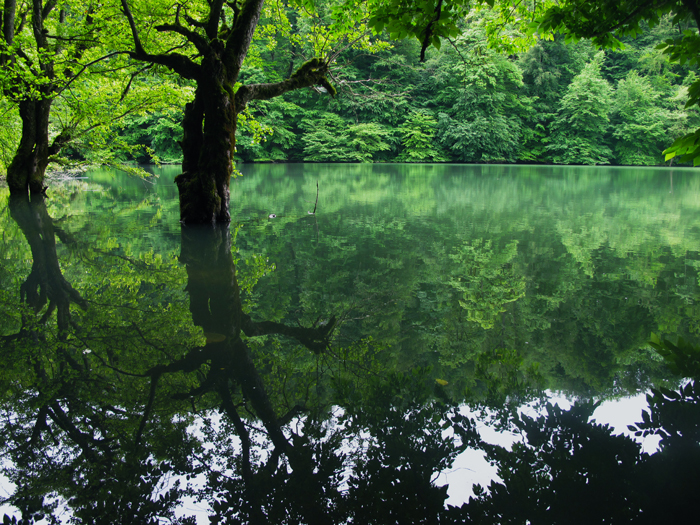
Lake Churat or Mianshe

== Geography and topography ==
The lake is locate in the northern region of Iran, within the boundaries of Mazandaran province and along the route crossing Sari and Kiasar, near the village of Churet.

== See also ==
- Caspian Sea
- Cheshme Belghais Garden
- National Botanical Garden of Iran
