= Jahan =

Jahan, meaning "world" in Persian, may refer to:

- Pierre Jahan (1909–2003), French photographer
- Shah Jahan (1592-1666), fifth Mughal emperor, reigned from 1628 to 1658
- Rita Jahan-Farouz (born 1962), known mononymously as Rita, Iranian-born Israeli singer and actress

== See also ==
- Jahan (name)
- Ishrat Jahan case (1985–2004), shooting and criminal case in the Gujarat state of India
- Jahan Nama (disambiguation), several places in Iran
