= Jahan Nama, Golestan =

Village in Golestan province, Iran

Jahan Nama Persian: جهان نما
- Village
- Location within Iran
- Coordinates: 36°40′44″N 54°17′22″E
- Country: Iran
- Province: Golestan
- County: Kordkuy
- District: Central
- Rural District: Chaharkuh

Population (2016)
  - Total: 114
- Time zone: UTC+3:30 (IRST)

Jahan Nama (Persian: جهان نما) (Note: Also romanized as Jahān Namā) is a village in Chaharkuh Rural District in the Central District of Kordkuy County, Golestan province, Iran.

== Demographics ==
=== Population ===
At the time of the 2006 National Census, the village's population was 99 in 43 households. The following census in 2011 counted 106 people in 44 households. The 2016 census measured the population of the village as 114 people in 39 households.

== Overview ==
This area is situated in the southern heights of Gorgan and the southeast of Kord Kooy. In 1973, it was claimed as a protected place with 30,650 hectares in area. This region was a recreational area for people of Gorgan and its nearby villages. Some important regions around this protected area are Torkat, Chalestan, Cholqoleh, Aq Reza, Chakel Geda, Landeh Kooh, Talou, Khoshdasti, Landou and Maqzi.

The most important varieties of wildlife are wild goat, wild sheep, venison, panther, wolf, bear, owl, eagle, weasel, and porcupine and its important plants are: Rosh, Azad, Barberry, Sorkhdar, Kolahe Mir Hassan, Bolandmaza Namdar, Borage Cowslipe, Ras, and Darmaneh. Several studies in the area during 1999, 2000, 2004, 2007 and 2008 found 1350 specimens, which included a total number of 607 vascular plant species that were identified from this area belonging to 329 genera and 85 families.

The most important rivers and springs of this protected place are: Sefid Rood, Tarkan, Mahzi, Chaar Baq, Ziyarat, Marsang, Sbumargah, Shahpasand, Haji Abad, Gachian, Mord Cheshmeh, Vara, Khosh Dasti, Kalichal, Qormehtou, Pazeebon. Ancient relics of the said area are: water tank, ancient center of Kamarsarak and Jelingbling, Imamzadeh Razi and Marzieh, and the tower western of Radkan.
