= Varnam, Iran =

Varnam (Persian: ورنام) in Iran may refer to:

- Varnam, Neka
- Varnam-e Bala, Sari County
- Varnam-e Pain, Sari County
