= Mazdeh =

Mazdeh or Mezdeh (Persian: مزده) may refer to:

- Mezdeh, Isfahan
- Mazdeh, Mazandaran
- Mazdeh, Razavi Khorasan
