= Rudbar-e Kharkhun =

Rudbar-e Kharkhun رودبارخارخون
- Village
- Location within Iran
- Coordinates: 36°17′44″N 53°10′52″E
- Country: Iran
- Province: Mazandaran
- County: Sari
- Bakhsh: Chahardangeh
- Rural District: Garmab

Population (2006)
  - Total: 185
- Time zone: UTC+3:30 (IRST)

Rudbar-e Kharkhun (Persian: رودبارخارخون, also Romanized as Rūdbār-e Khārkhūn; also known as Rūdbār) is a village in Garmab Rural District, Chahardangeh District, Sari County, Mazandaran Province, Iran. At the 2016 census, its population was 154, in 50 families. Down from 185 in 2006.
