= Kar Nam =

Village in Mazandaran province, Iran

Kar Nam Persian: كارنام
- Village
- Location within Iran
- Coordinates: 36°23′35″N 53°25′10″E
- Country: Iran
- Province: Mazandaran
- County: Sari
- District: Chahardangeh
- Rural District: Garmab

Population (2016)
  - Total: 254
- Time zone: UTC+3:30 (IRST)

Kar Nam (Persian: كارنام) (Note: Also romanized as Kār Nām; also known as Gornām-e Soflá, Kārnām-e Pā’īn, and Kārnām-e Soflá) is a village in Garmab Rural District of Chahardangeh District in Sari County, Mazandaran province, Iran.

== Demographics ==
=== Population ===
At the time of the 2006 National Census, the village's population was 278 in 73 households. The following census in 2011 counted 252 people in 79 households. The 2016 census measured the population of the village as 254 people in 87 households.
