= Kosut =

Village in Mazandaran Province, Iran

Kosut كسوت
- Village
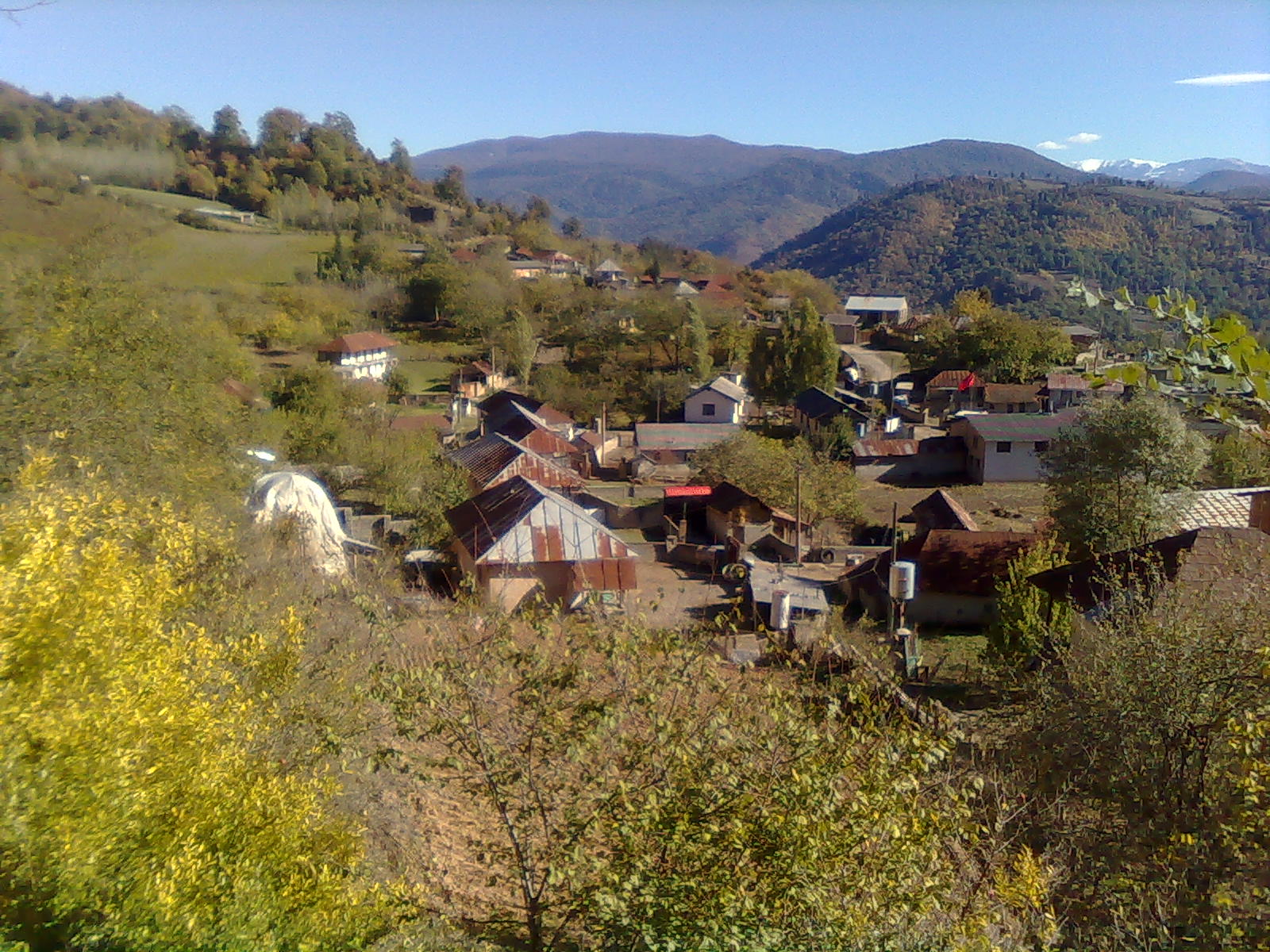
- Kosut, Garmab Rural District, Chahardangeh District, Sari County, Mazandaran Province, Iran

- Location within Iran
- Coordinates: 36°21′00″N 53°20′00″E
- Country: Iran
- Province: Mazandaran
- County: Sari
- Bakhsh: Chahardangeh
- Rural District: Garmab

Population (2016)
  - Total: 163
- Time zone: UTC+3:30 (IRST)

Kosut (Persian: كسوت, also Romanized as Kosūt) is a village in Garmab Rural District, Chahardangeh District, Sari County, Mazandaran Province, Iran. At the 2016 census, its population was 163, in 56 families. Up from 117 people in 2006.
