= Ervat =

Ervat اروت
- Village
- Location within Iran
- Coordinates: 36°13′17″N 53°23′24″E
- Country: Iran
- Province: Mazandaran
- County: Sari
- Bakhsh: Chahardangeh
- Rural District: Garmab

Population (2016)
  - Total: 169
- Time zone: UTC+3:30 (IRST)

Ervat (Persian: اروت; also known as Arvar) is a village in Garmab Rural District, Chahardangeh District, Sari County, Mazandaran Province, Iran. At the 2016 census, its population was 169, in 56 families.
