= Karsam =

Karsam كرسام
- Village
- Location within Iran
- Coordinates: 36°18′57″N 53°19′29″E
- Country: Iran
- Province: Mazandaran
- County: Sari
- Bakhsh: Chahardangeh
- Rural District: Garmab

Population (2016)
  - Total: 147
- Time zone: UTC+3:30 (IRST)

Karsam (Persian: كرسام, also Romanized as Karsām) is a village in Garmab Rural District, Chahardangeh District, Sari County, Mazandaran Province, Iran. At the 2006 census, its population was 147, in 60 families. Down from 193 people in 2006.
