= Haliyhuman =

Haliyhuman هليهومن
- Village
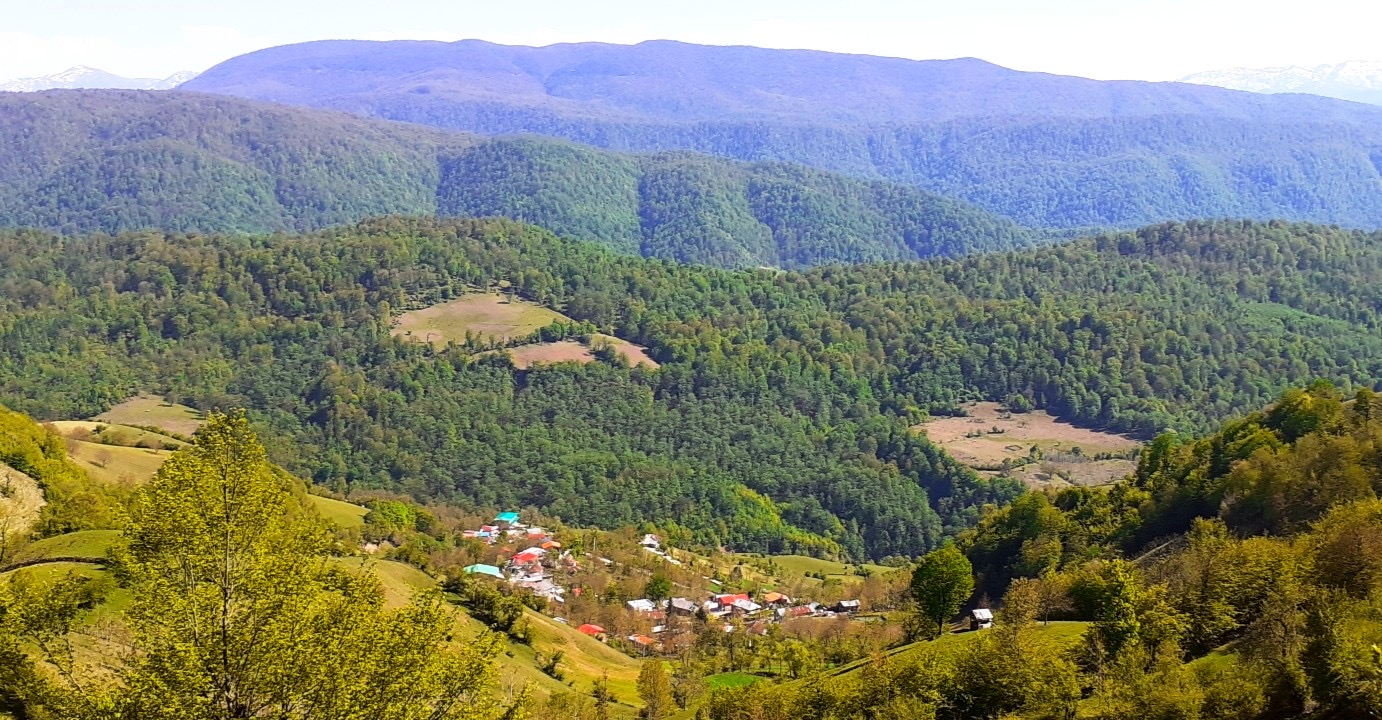

- Location within Iran
- Coordinates: 36°22′12″N 53°26′24″E
- Country: Iran
- Province: Mazandaran
- County: Sari
- Bakhsh: Chahardangeh
- Rural District: Garmab

Population (2016)
  - Total: 124
- Time zone: UTC+3:30 (IRST)

Haliyhuman (Persian: هليهومن, also Romanized as Halīyhūman; also known as Halīmand and Halīyūmand) is a village in Garmab Rural District, Chahardangeh District, Sari County, Mazandaran Province, Iran. At the 2006 census, its population was 141, in 28 families. In 2016, its population was 124, in 45 households.
