= Kalaj Khuseh =

Kalaj Khuseh كلاج خوسه
- Village
- Location within Iran
- Coordinates: 36°18′00″N 53°23′00″E
- Country: Iran
- Province: Mazandaran
- County: Sari
- Bakhsh: Chahardangeh
- Rural District: Garmab

Population (2016)
  - Total: 51
- Time zone: UTC+3:30 (IRST)

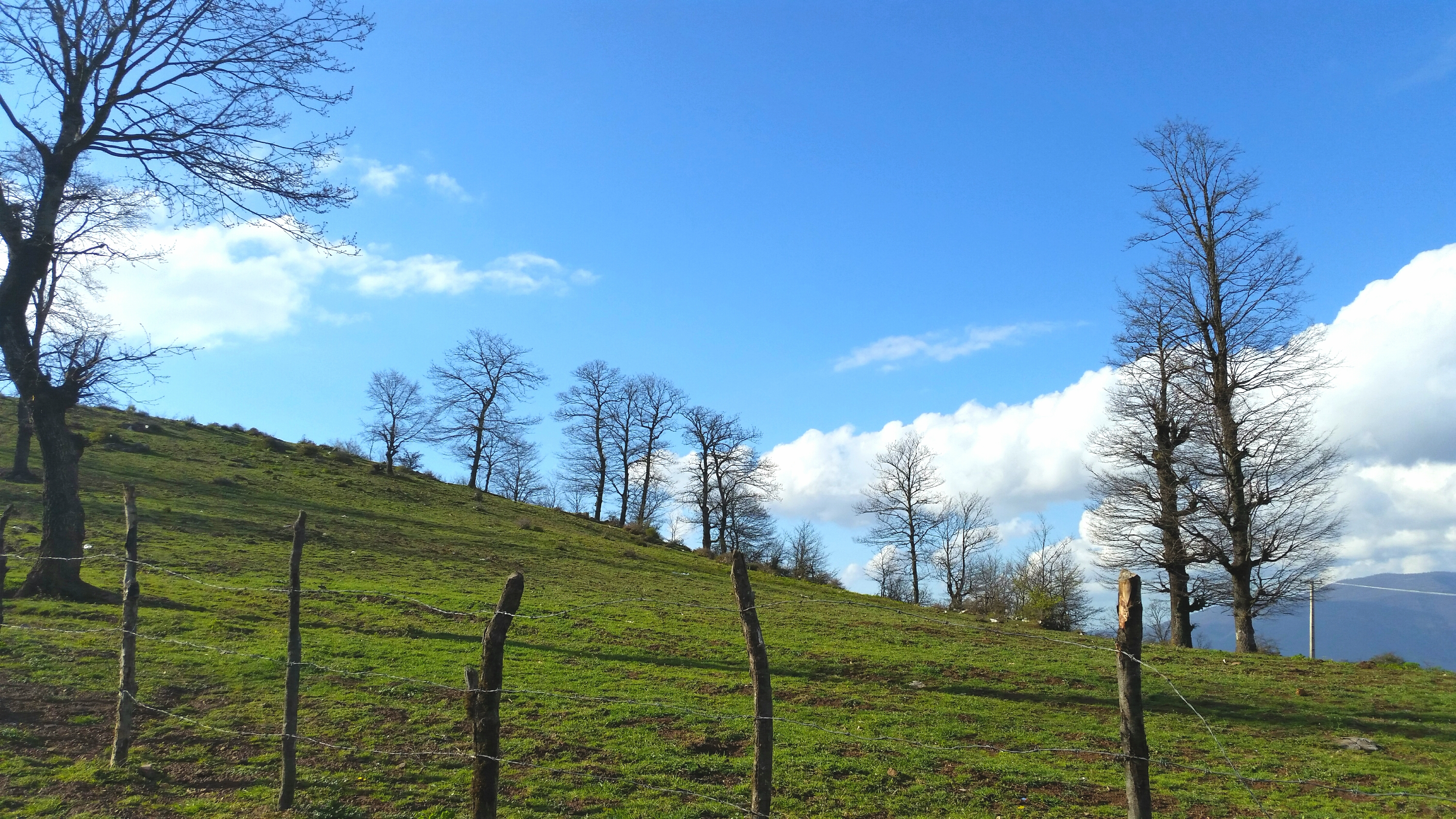
Mazandaran Province, Iran

Kalaj Khuseh (Persian: كلاج خوسه, also Romanized as Kalāj Khūseh; also known as Kalāj Khāseh) is a village in Garmab Rural District, Chahardangeh District, Sari County, Mazandaran Province, Iran. At the 2016 census, its population was 51, made up of 16 families. This was an increase from 19 people living there in 2006.
