= Hajji Kola, Chahardangeh =

Hajji Kola حاجي كلا
- Village
- Location within Iran
- Coordinates: 36°22′32″N 53°19′22″E
- Country: Iran
- Province: Mazandaran
- County: Sari
- Bakhsh: Chahardangeh
- Rural District: Garmab

Population (2016)
  - Total: 144
- Time zone: UTC+3:30 (IRST)

Hajji Kola (Persian: حاجي كلا, also Romanized as Ḩājjī Kolā, Ḩājī Kalā, and Ḩājjī Kalā; also known as Ḩājjī Kūlā) is a village in Garmab Rural District, Chahardangeh District, Sari County, Mazandaran Province, Iran. At the 2016 census, its population was 144, in 51 families. Down from 179 people in 2006.
