= Kajarestaq =

Kajarestaq كجرستاق
- Village
- Location within Iran
- Coordinates: 36°23′00″N 53°20′00″E
- Country: Iran
- Province: Mazandaran
- County: Sari
- Bakhsh: Chahardangeh
- Rural District: Garmab

Population (2006)
  - Total: 27
- Time zone: UTC+3:30 (IRST)

Kajarestaq (Persian: كجرستاق, also Romanized as Kajarestāq) is a village in Garmab Rural District, Chahardangeh District, Sari County, Mazandaran Province, Iran. At the 2006 census, its population was 27, in 6 families. In 2016, the village had less than 4 households.
