= Qadi Kola, Chahardangeh =

Village in Mazandaran province, Iran

Qadi Kola Persian: قاديكلا
- Village
- Location within Iran
- Coordinates: 36°20′21″N 53°24′29″E
- Country: Iran
- Province: Mazandaran
- County: Sari
- District: Chahardangeh
- Rural District: Garmab

Population (2016)
  - Total: 454
- Time zone: UTC+3:30 (IRST)

Qadi Kola (Persian: قاديكلا) (Note: Also romanized as Qādī Kalā and Qādī Kolā; also known as Qāẕī Kalā) is a village in Garmab Rural District of Chahardangeh District in Sari County, Mazandaran province, Iran.

== Demographics ==
=== Population ===
At the time of the 2006 National Census, the village's population was 448 in 131 households. The following census in 2011 counted 477 people in 139 households. The 2016 census measured the population of the village as 454 people in 160 households.
