= Paja, Iran =

Paja پاجا
- Village
- Location within Iran
- Coordinates: 36°16′18″N 53°22′19″E
- Country: Iran
- Province: Mazandaran
- County: Sari
- Bakhsh: Chahardangeh
- Rural District: Garmab

Population (2016)
  - Total: 35
- Time zone: UTC+3:30 (IRST)

Paja (Persian: پاجا, also Romanized as Pājā; also known as Pāchā) is a village in Garmab Rural District, Chahardangeh District, Sari County, Mazandaran Province, Iran. At the 2006 census, its population was 35, in 18 families. Down from 51 people in 2006.
