= Sadat Mahalleh, Sari =

Sadat Mahalleh سادات محله
- Village
- Location within Iran
- Coordinates: 36°24′06″N 53°22′23″E
- Country: Iran
- Province: Mazandaran
- County: Sari
- Bakhsh: Chahardangeh
- Rural District: Garmab

Population (2016)
  - Total: 181
- Time zone: UTC+3:30 (IRST)

Sadat Mahalleh (Persian: سادات محله, also Romanized as Sādāt Maḩalleh) is a village in Garmab Rural District, Chahardangeh District, Sari County, Mazandaran Province, Iran. At the 2016 census, its population was 181, in 68 families. Decreased from 296 people in 2006.
