= Baba Kola =

Village in Mazandaran province, Iran

Baba Kola Persian: باباكلا
- Village
- Location within Iran
- Coordinates: 36°19′38″N 53°29′39″E
- Country: Iran
- Province: Mazandaran
- County: Sari
- District: Chahardangeh
- Rural District: Garmab

Population (2016)
  - Total: 245
- Time zone: UTC+3:30 (IRST)

Baba Kola (Persian: باباكلا) (Note: Also romanized as Bābā Kalā and Bābā Kolā) is a village in Garmab Rural District of Chahardangeh District in Sari County, Mazandaran province, Iran.

== Demographics ==
=== Population ===
At the time of the 2006 National Census, the village's population was 283 in 58 households. The following census in 2011 counted 249 people in 65 households. The 2016 census measured the population of the village as 245 people in 80 households.
