= Kola Kardeh, Sari =

Kola Kardeh كلاكرده
- Village
- Location within Iran
- Coordinates: 36°23′55″N 53°26′01″E
- Country: Iran
- Province: Mazandaran
- County: Sari
- Bakhsh: Chahardangeh
- Rural District: Garmab

Population (2016)
  - Total: 32
- Time zone: UTC+3:30 (IRST)

Kola Kardeh (Persian: كلاكرده, also Romanized as Kolā Kardeh; also known as Kalū Kardeh, Kelav Kar Deh, and Kolū Kar Deh) is a village in Garmab Rural District, Chahardangeh District, Sari County, Mazandaran Province, Iran. At the 2006 census, its population was 32, in 12 families. Down from 43 in 2006.
