= Tir Jari =

Tir Jari تيرجاري
- Village
- Location within Iran
- Coordinates: 36°21′00″N 53°26′51″E
- Country: Iran
- Province: Mazandaran
- County: Sari
- Bakhsh: Chahardangeh
- Rural District: Garmab

Population (2006)
  - Total: 31
- Time zone: UTC+3:30 (IRST)

Tir Jari (Persian: تيرجاري, also Romanized as Tīr Jārī) is a village in Garmab Rural District, Chahardangeh District, Sari County, Mazandaran Province, Iran. At the 2006 census, its population was 31, in 5 families. In 2016 census, there were no households residing in the village.
