= Garmab Rural District =

Rural district in Mazandaran province, Iran

Garmab Rural District Persian: دهستان گرماب
- Rural District
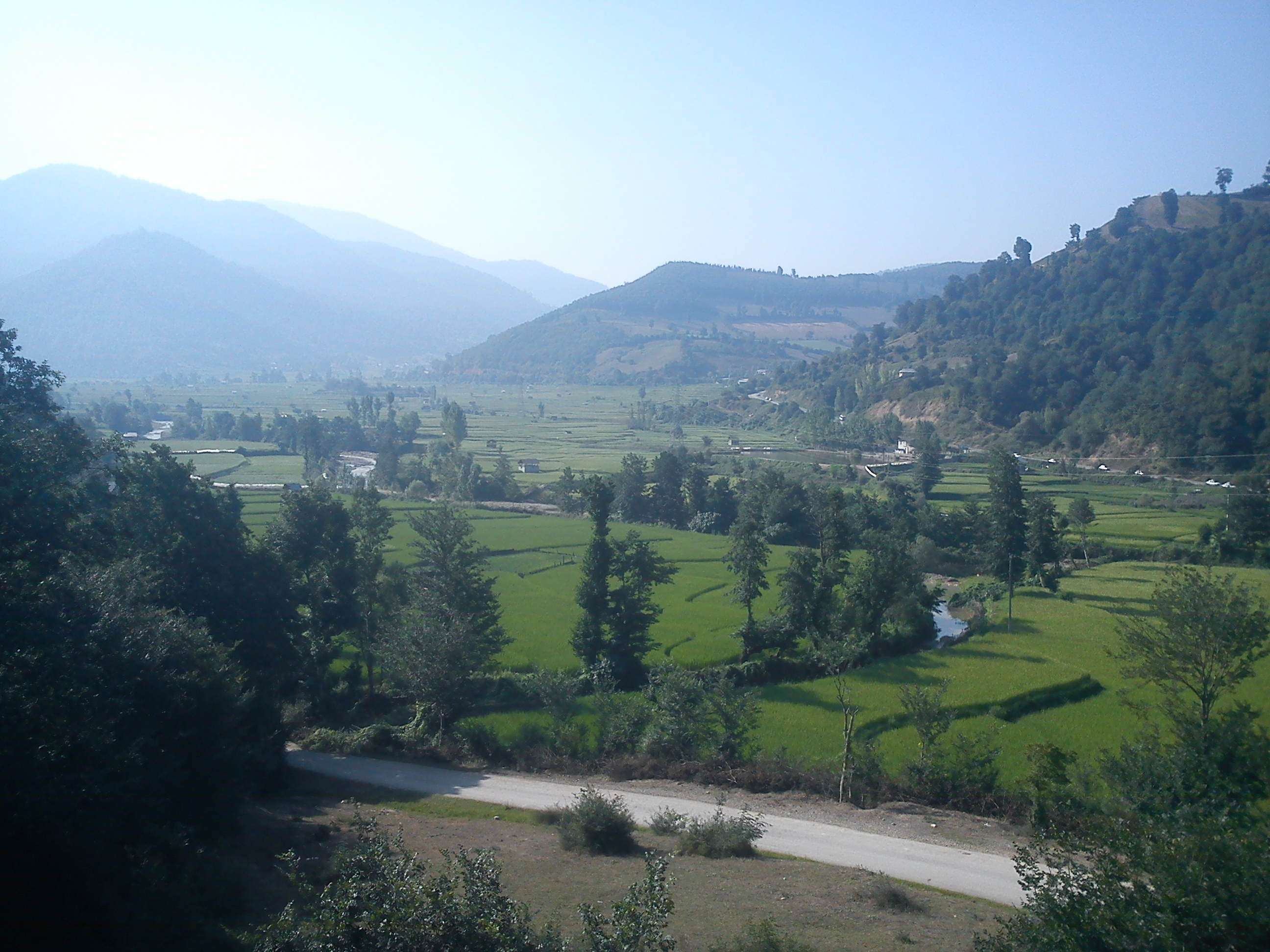
- Pol-e Garmab

- Location within Iran
- Coordinates: 36°18′N 53°24′E
- Country: Iran
- Province: Mazandaran
- County: Sari
- District: Chahardangeh
- Established: 1987
- Capital: Khal-e Kheyl

Population (2016)
  - Total: 5,804
- Time zone: UTC+3:30 (IRST)

Garmab Rural District (Persian: دهستان گرماب) is in Chahardangeh District of Sari County, Mazandaran province, Iran. Its capital is the village of Khal-e Kheyl.

== Demographics ==
=== Population ===
At the time of the 2006 National Census, the rural district's population was 6,610 in 1,554 households. There were 5,533 inhabitants in 1,638 households at the following census of 2011. The 2016 census measured the population of the rural district as 5,804 in 1,971 households. The most populous of its 35 villages was Churet, with 1,008 people.

=== Other villages in the rural district ===
- Akhvord
- Baba Kola
- Bajdam
- Elyerd
- Ervat
- Hajji Kola
- Haliyhuman
- Kajarestaq
- Kalaj Khuseh
- Kand Saban
- Kar Nam
- Karsam
- Khar Khun
- Kola Kardeh
- Kosut
- Mazdeh
- Narges Zamin
- Now Kandeh
- Paja
- Qadi Kola
- Rowshan Kuh
- Rudbar-e Kharkhun
- Sadat Mahalleh
- Salah
- Shishk
- Sorkh Valik
- Tir Jari
- Valaghuz
- Vanajem
- Varnam-e Bala
- Varnam-e Pain
- Zalam
