= Narges Zamin =

Narges Zamin نرگس زمين
- Village
- Location within Iran
- Coordinates: 36°13′58″N 53°22′39″E
- Country: Iran
- Province: Mazandaran
- County: Sari
- Bakhsh: Chahardangeh
- Rural District: Garmab

Population (2006)
  - Total: 93
- Time zone: UTC+3:30 (IRST)

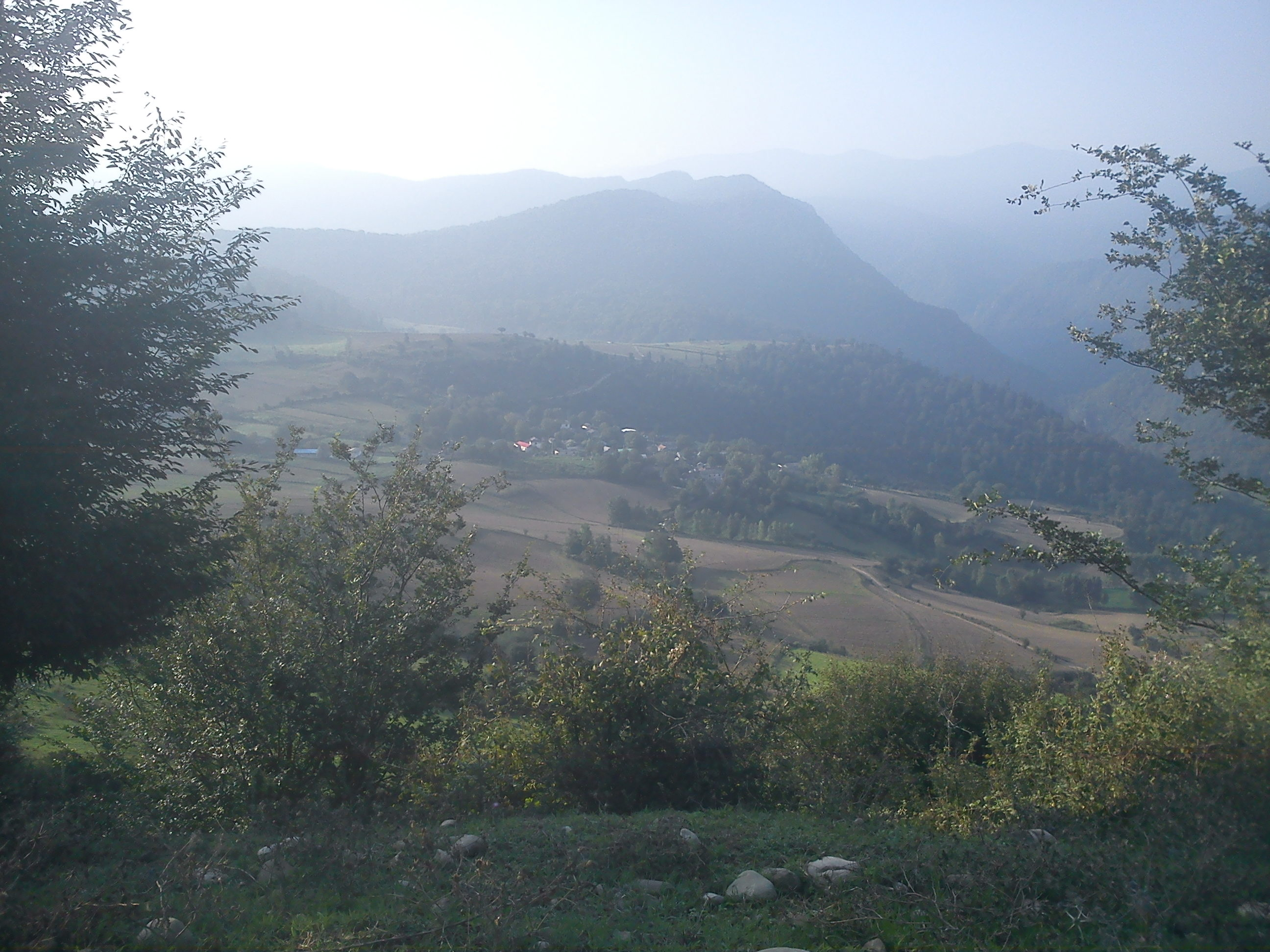

Narges Zamin (Persian: نرگس زمين, also Romanized as Narges Zamīn) is a village in Garmab Rural District, Chahardangeh District, Sari County, Mazandaran Province, Iran. At the 2016 census, its population was 55, in 20 families. Decreased from 93 people in 2006.
