= Elyerd =

Elyerd اليرد
- Village
- Location within Iran
- Coordinates: 36°18′06″N 53°20′28″E
- Country: Iran
- Province: Mazandaran
- County: Sari
- Bakhsh: Chahardangeh
- Rural District: Garmab

Population (2006)
  - Total: 138
- Time zone: UTC+3:30 (IRST)

Elyerd (Persian: اليرد, also Romanized as Elyerd and Alīyerd) is a village in Garmab Rural District, Chahardangeh District, Sari County, Mazandaran Province, Iran. At the 2016 census, its population was 138, in 59 families. Increased from 57 people in 2006.

== Climate ==
Elyerd has a Mediterranean climate where summers are hot and dry while winter temperatures are mild. The average annual temperature in Elyerd is 19° and the average annual rainfall is 206 mm.
