= Kand Saban =

Kand Saban كندسبن
- Village
- Location within Iran
- Coordinates: 36°23′00″N 53°21′00″E
- Country: Iran
- Province: Mazandaran
- County: Sari
- Bakhsh: Chahardangeh
- Rural District: Garmab

Population (2016)
  - Total: 10
- Time zone: UTC+3:30 (IRST)

Kand Saban (Persian: كندسبن, also Romanized as Kondes Bon; also known as Kajarestāq and Kojā Rūstā) is a village in Garmab Rural District, Chahardangeh District, Sari County, Mazandaran Province, Iran. At the 2006 census, its population was 20, in 7 families. Decreased to 10 people and 4 households in 2016.
