= Sorkh Valik =

Village in Mazandaran province, Iran

Sorkh Valik Persian: سرخ وليك
- Village
- Location within Iran
- Coordinates: 36°18′45″N 53°17′56″E
- Country: Iran
- Province: Mazandaran
- County: Sari
- District: Chahardangeh
- Rural District: Garmab

Population (2016)
  - Total: 197
- Time zone: UTC+3:30 (IRST)

Sorkh Valik (Persian: سرخ وليك) (Note: Also romanized as Sorkh Valīk; also known as Sorkh Valī and Sorkh Valtak) is a village in Garmab Rural District of Chahardangeh District in Sari County, Mazandaran province, Iran.

== Demographics ==
=== Population ===
At the time of the 2006 National Census, the village's population was 242 in 51 households. The following census in 2011 counted 211 people in 63 households. The 2016 census measured the population of the village as 197 people in 66 households.
