= Bajdam =

Bajdam بجدم
- Village
- Location within Iran
- Coordinates: 36°21′28″N 53°25′22″E
- Country: Iran
- Province: Mazandaran
- County: Sari
- Bakhsh: Chahardangeh
- Rural District: Garmab

Population (2016)
  - Total: 35
- Time zone: UTC+3:30 (IRST)

Bajdam (Persian: بجدم; also known as Bozdam) is a village in Garmab Rural District, Chahardangeh District, Sari County, Mazandaran Province, Iran. At the 2006 census, its population was 37, in 6 families. In 2016, its population was 35, in 13 households.
