= Shishk =

Shishk شيشك
- Village
- Location within Iran
- Coordinates: 36°24′33″N 53°26′51″E
- Country: Iran
- Province: Mazandaran
- County: Sari
- Bakhsh: Chahardangeh
- Rural District: Garmab

Population (2016)
  - Total: 113
- Time zone: UTC+3:30 (IRST)

Shishk (Persian: شيشك, also Romanized as Shīshk; also known as Sheshk and Sheshtak) is a village in Garmab Rural District, Chahardangeh District, Sari County, Mazandaran Province, Iran. In the 2016 census, its population was 113, with 42 families. Down from 173 people in 2006.
