= Khar Khun =

Village in Mazandaran province, Iran

Khar Khun Persian: خرخون
- Village
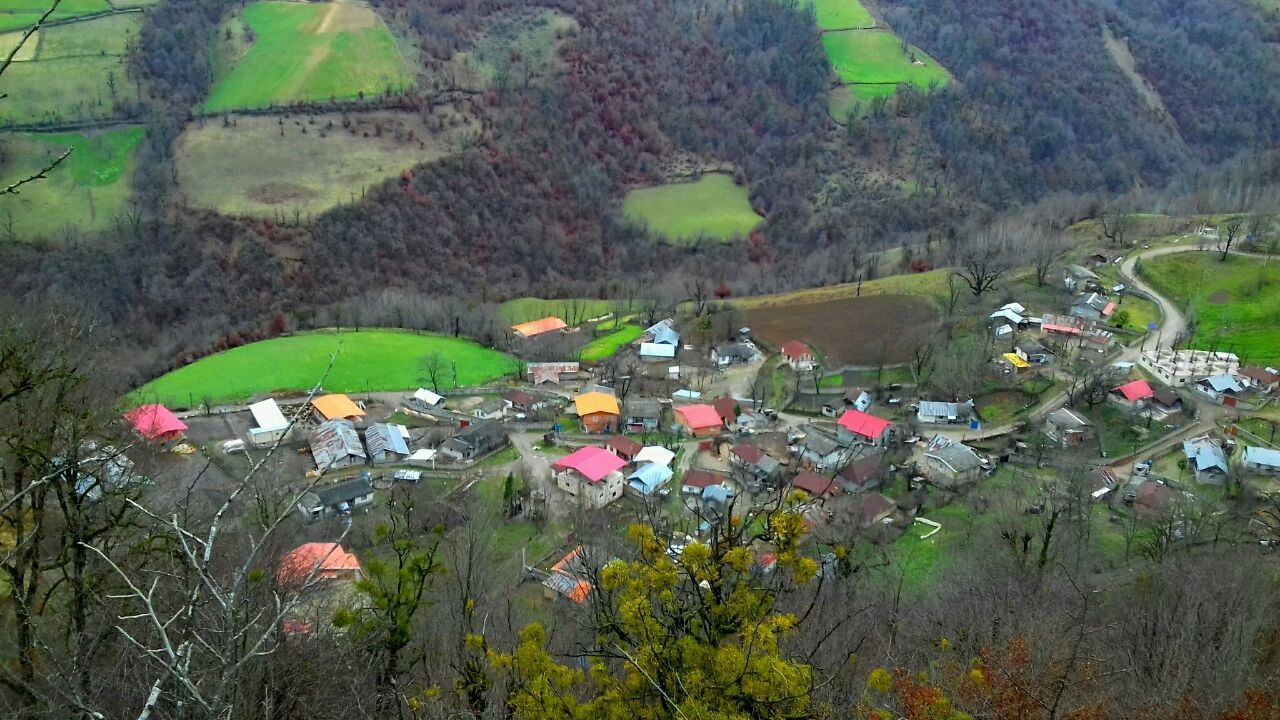
- The village of Khar Khun

- Location within Iran
- Coordinates: 36°20′16″N 53°26′44″E
- Country: Iran
- Province: Mazandaran
- County: Sari
- District: Chahardangeh
- Rural District: Garmab

Population (2016)
  - Total: 203
- Time zone: UTC+3:30 (IRST)

Khar Khun (Persian: خارخون) (Note: Also romanized as Khār Khūn) is a village in Garmab Rural District of Chahardangeh District in Sari County, Mazandaran province, Iran.

== Demographics ==
=== Population ===
At the time of the 2006 National Census, the village's population was 195 in 40 households. The following census in 2011 counted 160 people in 41 households. The 2016 census measured the population of the village as 203 people in 62 households.
