= Zalam, Sari =

Zalam زلم
- Village
- Location within Iran
- Coordinates: 36°18′22″N 53°23′21″E
- Country: Iran
- Province: Mazandaran
- County: Sari
- Bakhsh: Chahardangeh
- Rural District: Garmab

Population (2016)
  - Total: 193
- Time zone: UTC+3:30 (IRST)

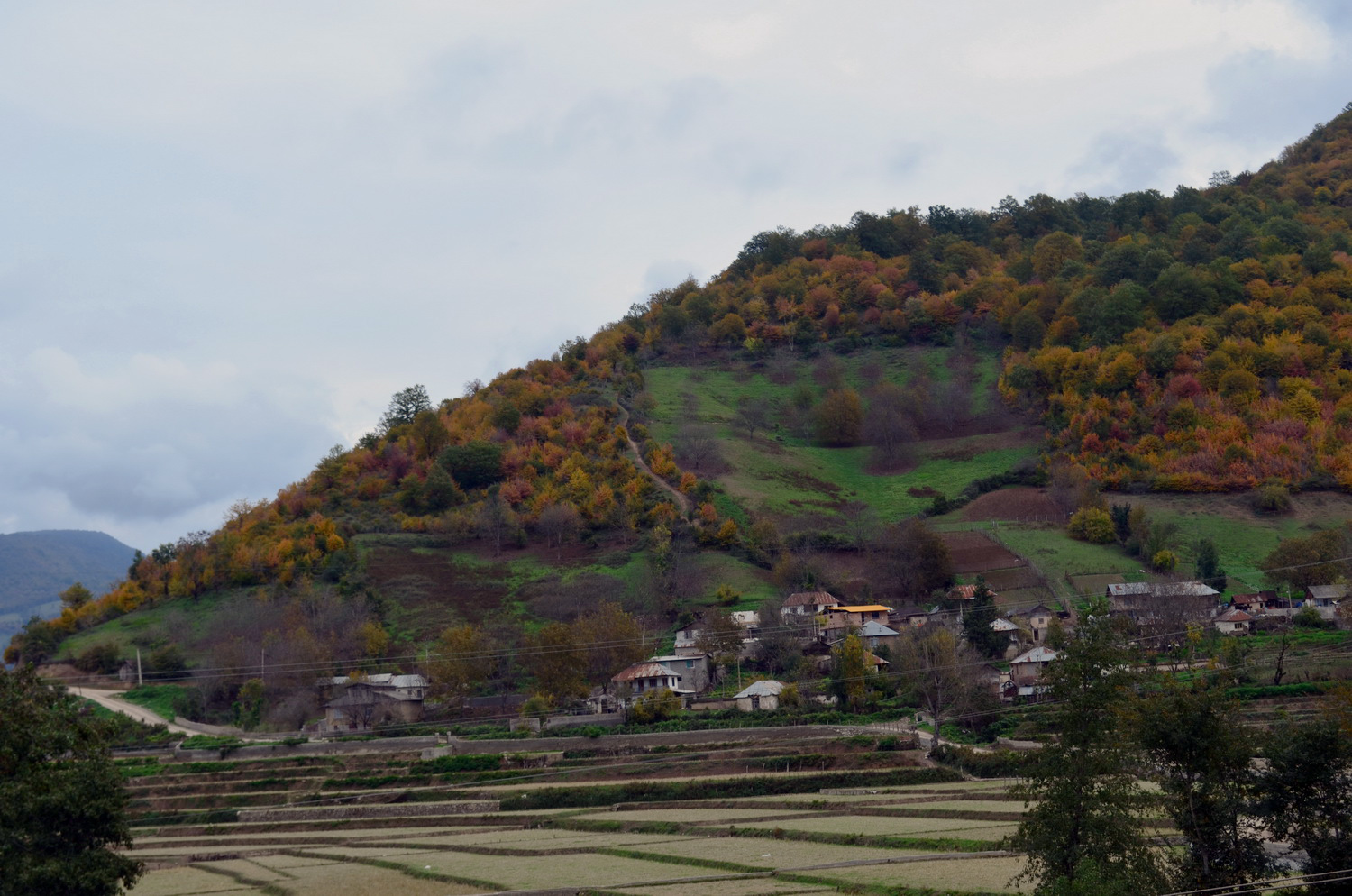

Zalam (Persian: زلم; also known as Rūdbār Zalam and Z̧alam Rūdbār) is a village in Garmab Rural District, Chahardangeh District, Sari County, Mazandaran Province, Iran. At the 2016 census, its population was 193, in 74 families. Up from 180 in 2006.
