= Now Kandeh, Mazandaran =

Now Kandeh نوكنده
- Village
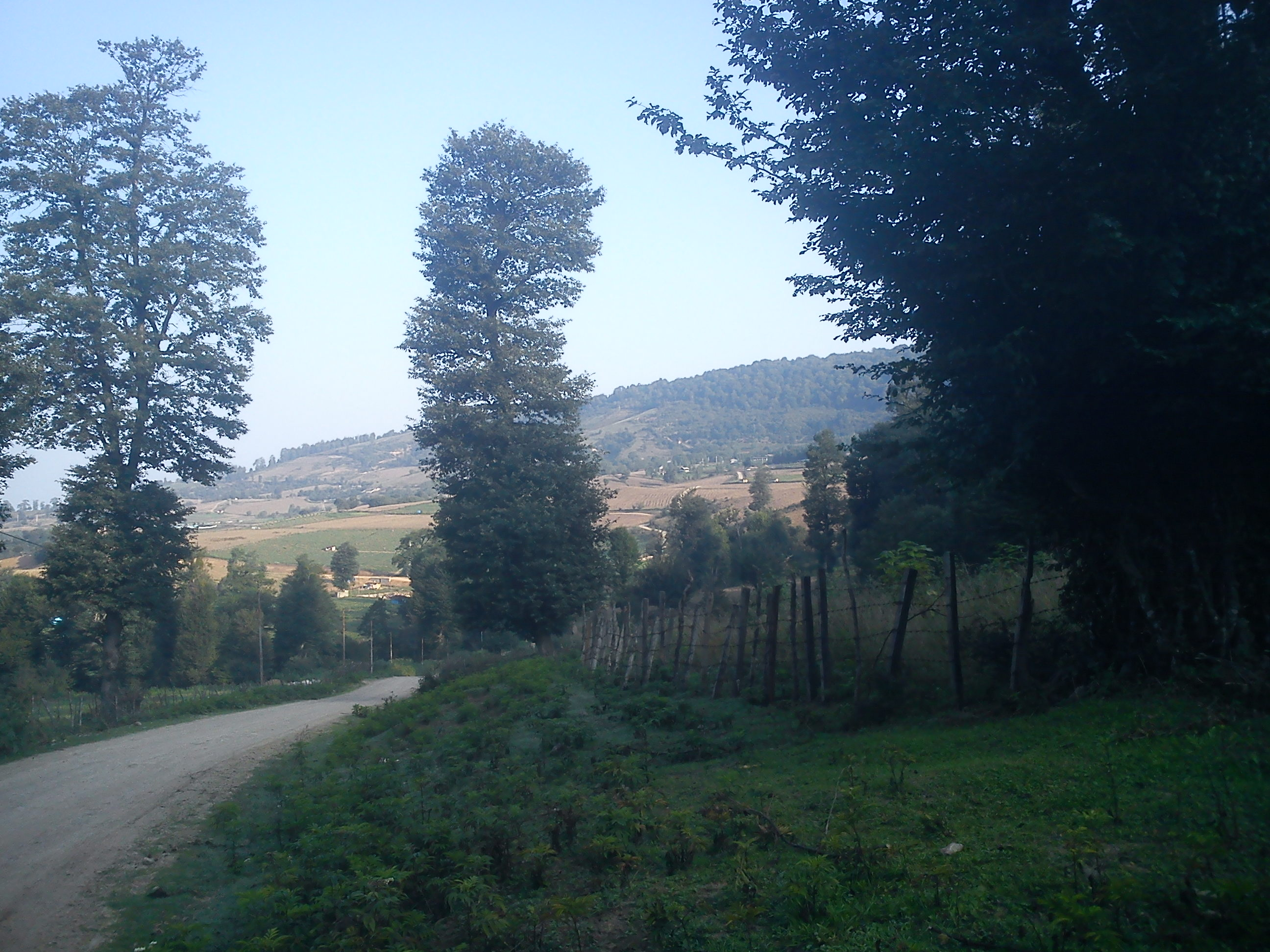

- Location within Iran
- Coordinates: 36°14′48″N 53°22′09″E
- Country: Iran
- Province: Mazandaran
- County: Sari
- Bakhsh: Chahardangeh
- Rural District: Garmab

Population (2016)
  - Total: 166
- Time zone: UTC+3:30 (IRST)

Now Kandeh (Persian: نوكنده) is a village in Garmab Rural District, Chahardangeh District, Sari County, Mazandaran Province, Iran. At the 2016 census, its population was 166, in 65 families. Decreased from 341 people in 2006.
