= Vanajem =

Vanajem وناجم
- Village
- Location within Iran
- Coordinates: 36°21′36″N 53°24′16″E
- Country: Iran
- Province: Mazandaran
- County: Sari
- Bakhsh: Chahardangeh
- Rural District: Garmab

Population (2016)
  - Total: 150
- Time zone: UTC+3:30 (IRST)

Vanajem (Persian: وناجم, also Romanized as Vanājem; also known as Vanājān) is a village in Garmab Rural District, Chahardangeh District, Sari County, Mazandaran Province, Iran. At the 2016 census, its population was 150, in 38 families. Up from 133 in 2006.
