= Akhvord =

Akhvord آخورد آخرد (Mazandarani)
- Village
- Location within Iran
- Coordinates: 36°24′04″N 53°21′44″E
- Country: Iran
- Province: Mazandaran
- County: Sari
- Bakhsh: Chahardangeh
- Rural District: Garmab

Population (2016)
  - Total: 40
- Time zone: UTC+3:30 (IRST)

Akhvord (Persian: آخورد, also Romanized as Ākhvord), known in Mazanderani as Āxērd (Persian: آخرد), is a village in Garmab Rural District, Chahardangeh District, Sari County, Mazandaran Province, Iran. At the 2016 census, its population was 40, in 17 families. Down from 43 in 2006.
