= Khal-e Kheyl =

Village in Mazandaran province, Iran

Khal-e Kheyl Persian: خال خيل
- Village
- Location within Iran
- Coordinates: 36°19′30″N 53°21′11″E
- Country: Iran
- Province: Mazandaran
- County: Sari
- District: Chahardangeh
- Rural District: Garmab

Population (2016)
  - Total: 591
- Time zone: UTC+3:30 (IRST)

Khal-e Kheyl (Persian: خال خيل) (Note: Also romanized as Khāl Kheyl, Khāl-e Kheyl, and Khāl-e Khīl) is a village in, and the capital of, Garmab Rural District in Chahardangeh District of Sari County, Mazandaran province, Iran.

== Demographics ==
=== Population ===
At the time of the 2006 National Census, the village's population was 552 in 134 households. The following census in 2011 counted 589 people in 161 households. The 2016 census measured the population of the village as 591 people in 184 households.
