= Sadan Rostaq-e Sharqi Rural District =

Rural district in Golestan province, Iran

Sadan Rostaq-e Sharqi Rural District Persian: دهستان سدن رستاق شرقي
- Rural District
- Location within Iran
- Coordinates: 36°48′N 54°13′E
- Country: Iran
- Province: Golestan
- County: Kordkuy
- District: Central
- Established: 1987
- Capital: Yesaqi

Population (2016)
  - Total: 14,979
- Time zone: UTC+3:30 (IRST)

Sadan Rostaq-e Sharqi Rural District (Persian: دهستان سدن رستاق شرقي) is in the Central District of Kordkuy County, Golestan province, Iran. Its capital is the village of Yesaqi.

== Demographics ==
=== Population ===
At the time of the 2006 National Census, the rural district's population was 15,586 in 3,932 households. There were 15,609 inhabitants in 4,647 households at the following census of 2011. The 2016 census measured the population of the rural district as 14,979 in 4,983 households. The most populous of its 14 villages was Yesaqi, with 4,093 people.

=== Other villages in the rural district ===
- Cheqer
- Dangelan
- Do Rud Mahalleh
- Eslamabad-e Shadeh
- Gholamabad
- Gorji Mahalleh
- Mehtar Kalateh
- Miandarreh
- Mofidabad
- Mohammadabad
- Naman
- Zera Mahalleh
