= Kordkuy =

City in Golestan province, Iran

Kordkuy Persian: کردکوی
- City
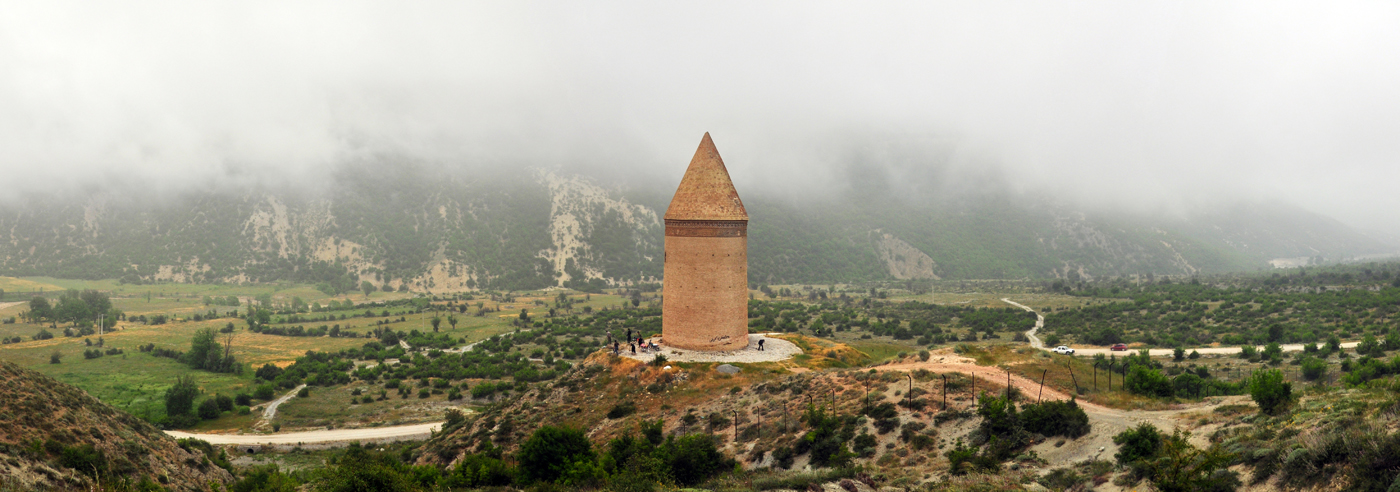

- Location within Iran
- Coordinates: 36°47′31″N 54°06′48″E
- Country: Iran
- Province: Golestan
- County: Kordkuy
- District: Central

Population (2016)
  - Total: 39,881
- Time zone: UTC+3:30 (IRST)

Kordkuy (Persian: كرد كوی) (Note: Also romanized as Kord Kūy; also known as Kord Kū and Kurd Kūi The former name of Kordkuy was Tamiše, which was also attributed to the western part of Gorgan) is a city in the Central District of Kordkuy County, Golestan province, Iran, serving as capital of both the county and the district. Kordkuy's most important harvests are husked rice, wheat, cotton, and soya.

== History ==
In 1151 (A.H.), Nader Shah Afshar, after defeating the famous Ottoman general Topal Osman Pasha and conquering Baghdad, while passing through Uramanat in Kurdistan, south of Sanandaj, moved all the people of Paveh region, who were brave and warrior men, and at the same time, skilled shooters and gunpowder makers, towards Estarabad (Gorgan) to be both responsible for equipping his army and to establish a huge barrier against the Turkmens, who were raiding and looting Estarabad and its surroundings from time to time.

Nader shah placed the responsibility of the Paveh people on a person named Mirza Shafi Bey Paveh, and with the unity and cohesion of this clan, the Turkmens were defeated. After the suppression of the Turkmen by the Paveh people, Nader Shah did not allow them to return ( It is very likely that the elders of the Paveh people themselves did not want to return, because the lands that were given to them in Kurdkoy in exchange for their services were much more fertile and were better) and settled them in an area of Golestan that was later named Kurdkoi due to their Kurdish origin.

Kordkuy was a part of Gorgan until 1979 when it gained city status.

== Demographics ==
=== Language ===
The natives of Kordkuy call their city Kard Male (or Kord Mahaleh) and speak Mazandarani.

=== Population ===
At the time of the 2006 National Census, the city's population was 28,991 in 7,611 households. The following census in 2011 counted 38,246 people in 11,415 households. The 2016 census measured the population of the city as 39,881 people in 12,971 households.

== Geography ==
Kordkuy, meaning "the neighborhood of Kurds" (formerly Tamiše), is located in the western part of Golestan province. It is connected to the Caspian Sea from the north and the west, to Bandar-e Gaz, the east to Gorgan, and from the south to Damghan of Semnan province. Its southern parts are enclosed with the heights of the Alborz (Elbruz) mountains.
