= Varnam (company) =

Traditional toy-making company

Varnam (meaning ‘colors’) is a social enterprise that has been working with artisans in Channapatna, Karnataka in India, for more than four years. It has produced a series of designs intended to bring this 200-year-old toy-making craft into the home and lifestyle. Using traditional lac-turnery methods popularized by the traditional Channapatna toys range, the label produces home and lifestyle products, toys and jewelry.

== History ==
Varnam was started in 2011 by Karthik Vaidyanathan, at the suggestion of his mother, who recommended he "do a small exhibition of soft furnishings for friends, similar to the ones I had done for her" after he received praise for the design of his own home. The exhibition's success inspired Vaidyanathan to continue on creative projects. Varnam began its journey with soft furnishings but soon embraced the founder's love for the Channapatna craft.

Channapatna toys are a particular form of wooden toys (and dolls) that are manufactured in the town of Channapatna in the State of Karnataka, India. As a result of the popularity of these toys, Channapatna is known as Gombegala Ooru (toy-town) of Karnataka. Traditionally, the work involved lacquering the wood of the Wrightia tinctoria tree, colloquially called Aale mara (ivory-wood).

Vaidyanathan began by visiting Channapatna artisans and observing their production processes. He then started working with the artisans. A few months later, he released a jewelry range and a children's range of toys at Varnam. In 2014, after selling on the internet and through certain retail stores across the city, the brand's first flagship store, called the Varnam Store, was started at Indiranagar in Bengaluru.

== Social Enterprise ==
Varnam employs female Channapatna artisans. In an industry where more than 90% of the artisans are men, many of Varnam's products have been handcrafted by female artisans.

== Design Philosophy ==
Varnam has been credited with bringing modern aesthetic sensibilities and design philosophies to a traditional craft. Products usually have utilitarian aspect as evidenced in the Oinkston range of tableware and others. This enables these traditional-crafted products to be showcased on par with more contemporary products in lifestyle stores and other outlets and has been largely responsible for the resurgence of public interest in Channapatna arts and crafts.

Varnam has also brought modern manufacturing ideas into the traditional craft. The design has been primarily templatized to ensure a consistent profile and create a distinct visual aesthetic identity. Products ship with dimensional characteristics, graphic usage, and care instructions, allowing the artisans to access a wider audience with modern sensibilities. Boxes have been standardized to ease flows through e-retail channels.

In relation to the artisans, Varnam's attempt has been to enhance the sense of pride amongst the skillful master craftsmen and ensure this craft's continuity by becoming a Fair Trade Associate; so they don't leave their traditional crafts for industry/factory ‘jobs’.

== Accreditation ==
Varnam is certified by Craft mark, which is initiated by All India Artisans Welfare Association (AIACA).

The Channapatna toy craft itself is protected as a Geographical Indication (GI) under the World Trade Organization, administered by the Government of Karnataka.

== Awards ==
- Winner of two Blue Elephants at Kyoorius-D&AD Design awards 2013 in two categories – packaging & design craft
- Winner of CII-NID Design Excellence Award 2013 – ‘Industrial design-home products’ category for the ‘Oinkston tableware’ series
- Winner of CII-NID Design Excellence Award 2014 – ‘Visual communication’ overall category award and ‘Packaging Design’ Award.
