= Valaghuz, Mazandaran =

Village in Mazandaran province, Iran

Valaghuz Persian: ول اغوز
- Village
- Location within Iran
- Coordinates: 36°16′25″N 53°20′32″E
- Country: Iran
- Province: Mazandaran
- County: Sari
- District: Chahardangeh
- Rural District: Garmab

Population (2016)
  - Total: 312
- Time zone: UTC+3:30 (IRST)

Valaghuz (Persian: ول اغوز) (Note: Also romanized as Valāghūz) is a village in Garmab Rural District of Chahardangeh District in Sari County, Mazandaran province, Iran.

== Demographics ==
=== Population ===
At the time of the 2006 National Census, the village's population was 160 in 38 households. The following census in 2011 counted 182 people in 61 households. The 2016 census measured the population of the village as 312 people in 108 households.
