= Jahan-Nama Tower =

Building in Isfahan, Iran

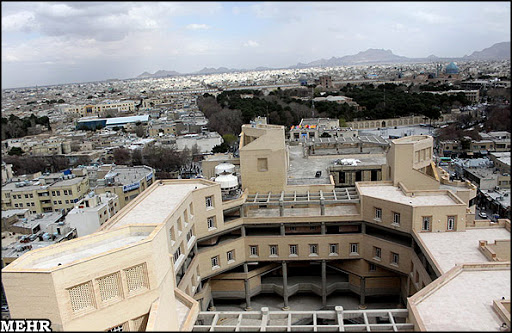

General information
- Type: Business
- Coordinates: 32°39′28.29″N 51°40′6.63″E

The Jahan-Nama Tower (Translit World view tower Persian:برج جهان نما) is a building built by Municipality of Isfahan in Imam Hosein Square, Isfahan. Two of its top floors were demolished as they ruined the historic views (visual conflict) from Naqsh-e Jahan Square. It was first built in 1996 by demolishing the historic Tahdid caravansarai (an Iranian Registered National Heritage). Initially, it was meant to be 50 meters high, but that was reduced by a UNESCO intervention. Iranian President Mohammad Khatami wrote a letter to minister of cultural heritage and tourism .

I have spoken with UNESCO chief, UNESCO will end the case if only this tower is reduced.

In 2006, two of its top floors were demolished.

== Gallery ==
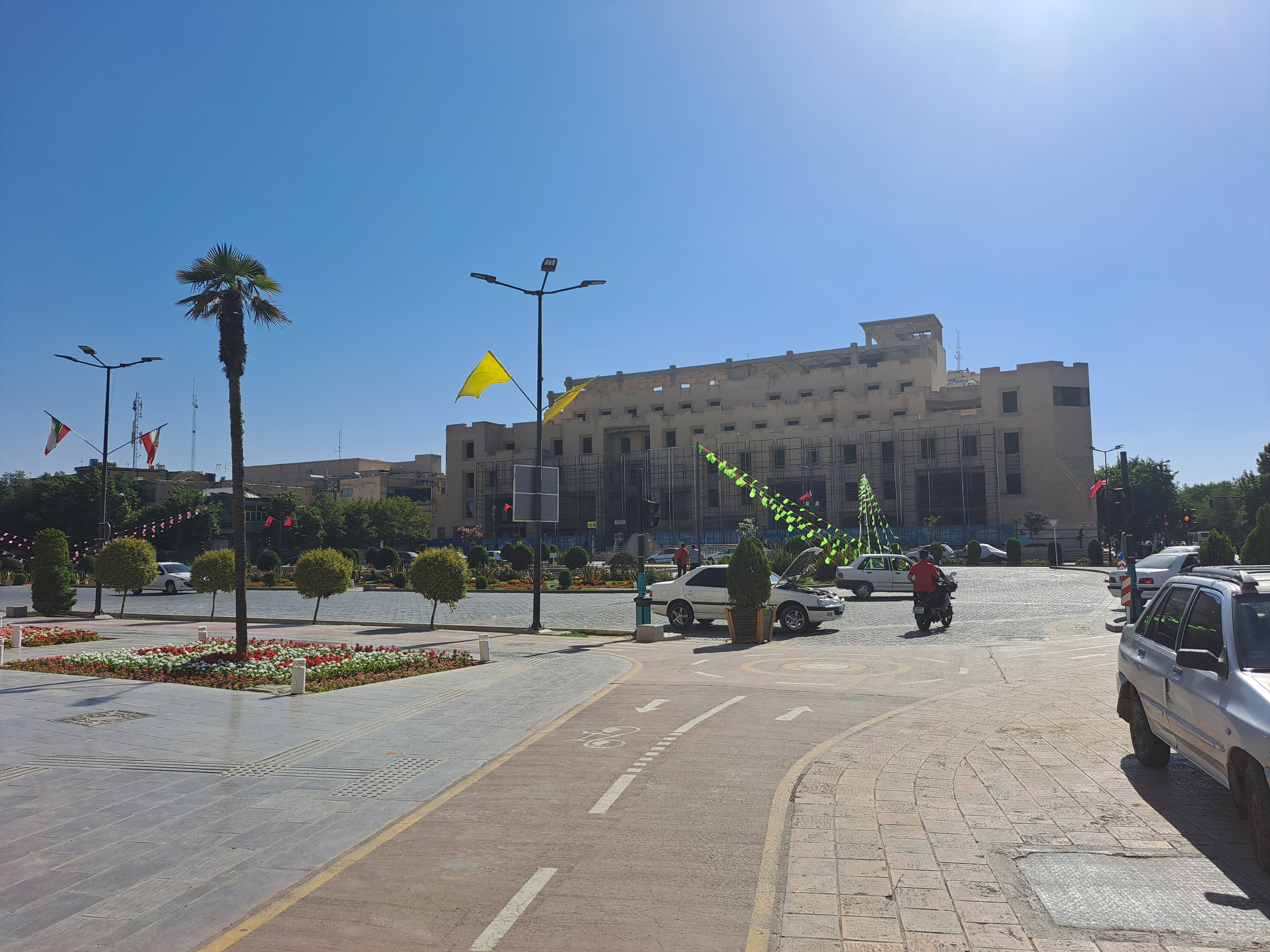
Jahan Nama hotel, 2023

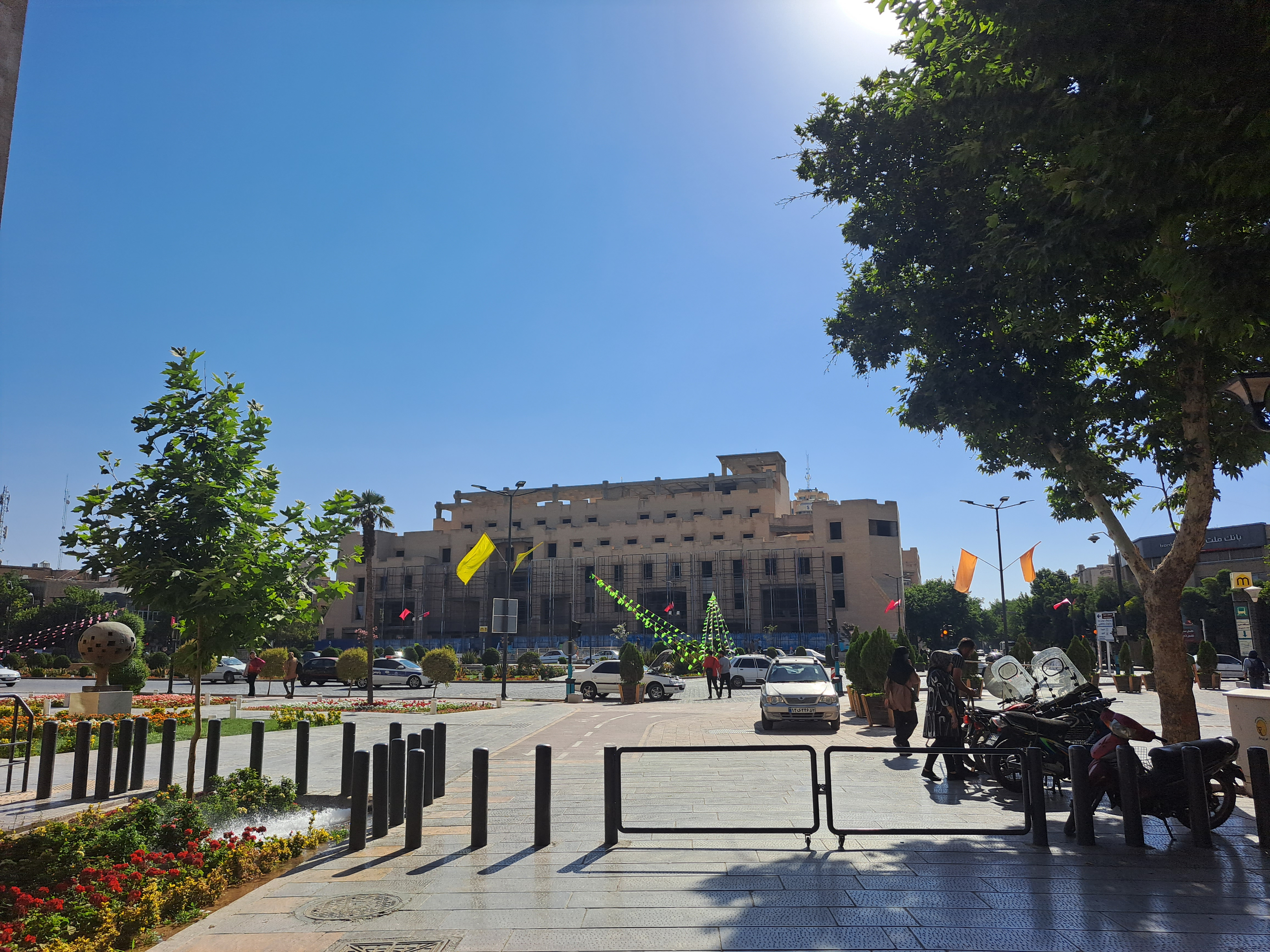
Jahan Nama hotel, 2023
