= Churet =

Village in Mazandaran province, Iran

Churet Persian: چورت
- Village
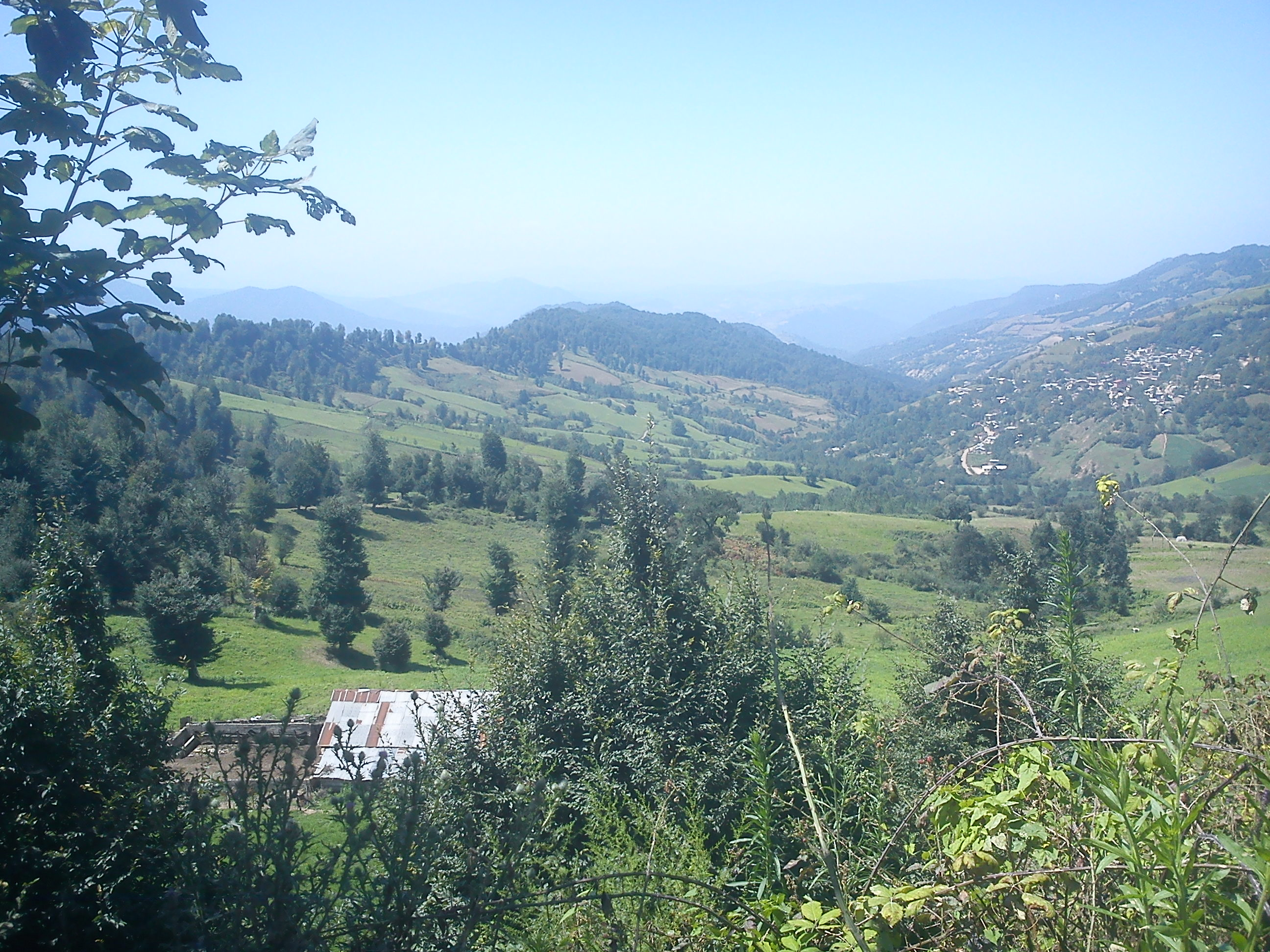
- Landscape near the village of Churet

- Location within Iran
- Coordinates: 36°22′20″N 53°28′06″E
- Country: Iran
- Province: Mazandaran
- County: Sari
- District: Chahardangeh
- Rural District: Garmab

Population (2016)
  - Total: 1,008
- Time zone: UTC+3:30 (IRST)

Churet (Persian: چورت) (Note: Also romanized as Chūrat and Chūret) is a village in Garmab Rural District of Chahardangeh District in Sari County, Mazandaran province, Iran. Churet Lake is located nearby.

== Demographics ==
=== Population ===
At the time of the 2006 National Census, the village's population was 1,374 in 276 households. The following census in 2011 counted 1,175 people in 291 households. The 2016 census measured the population of the village as 1,008 people in 302 households, the most populous in its rural district.
