= Varnam-e Bala =

Varnam-e Bala ورنام بالا
- Village
- Location within Iran
- Coordinates: 36°21′47″N 53°26′11″E
- Country: Iran
- Province: Mazandaran
- County: Sari
- Bakhsh: Chahardangeh
- Rural District: Garmab

Population (2016)
  - Total: 63
- Time zone: UTC+3:30 (IRST)

Varnam-e Bala (Persian: ورنام بالا, also Romanized as Varnām-e Bālā; also known as Varnām and Varnām-e ‘Olyā) is a village in Garmab Rural District, Chahardangeh District, Sari County, Mazandaran Province, Iran. At the 2006 census, its population was 67, in 18 families. In 2016, its population was 63, in 22 households.
