= Jahan Nama, Fars =

Jahan Nama جهان نما
- Village
- Location within Iran
- Coordinates: 29°59′30″N 52°21′18″E
- Country: Iran
- Province: Fars
- County: Sepidan
- Bakhsh: Beyza
- Rural District: Beyza

Population (2006)
  - Total: 85
- Time zone: UTC+3:30 (IRST)
  - Summer (DST): UTC+4:30 (IRDT)

Jahan Nama (Persian: جهان نما, also Romanized as Jahān Namā and Jahān Nemā) is a village in Beyza Rural District, Beyza District, Sepidan County, Fars province, Iran. At the 2006 census, its population was 85, in 19 families.
