= Sadan Rostaq-e Gharbi Rural District =

Rural district in Golestan province, Iran

Sadan Rostaq-e Gharbi Rural District Persian: دهستان سدن رستاق غربي
- Rural District
- Location within Iran
- Coordinates: 36°47′N 54°10′E
- Country: Iran
- Province: Golestan
- County: Kordkuy
- District: Central
- Established: 1987
- Capital: Chahar Deh

Population (2016)
  - Total: 10,681
- Time zone: UTC+3:30 (IRST)

Sadan Rostaq-e Gharbi Rural District (Persian: دهستان سدن رستاق غربي) is in the Central District of Kordkuy County, Golestan province, Iran. Its capital is the village of Chahar Deh.

== Demographics ==
=== Population ===
At the time of the 2006 National Census, the rural district's population was 11,165 in 3,072 households. There were 10,862 inhabitants in 3,395 households at the following census of 2011. The 2016 census measured the population of the rural district as 10,681 in 3,690 households. The most populous of its nine villages was Bala Jaddeh, with 3,604 people.

=== Other villages in the rural district ===
- Alang
- Badilabad
- Ilvar-e Panj Dangeh
- Ilvar-e Yek Dangeh
- Karimabad
- Khorramabad
- Qalandar Ayesh
