= Varnam-e Pain =

Varnam-e Pain ورنام پائين
- Village
- Location within Iran
- Coordinates: 36°21′59″N 53°26′36″E
- Country: Iran
- Province: Mazandaran
- County: Sari
- Bakhsh: Chahardangeh
- Rural District: Garmab

Population (2016)
  - Total: 99
- Time zone: UTC+3:30 (IRST)

Varnam-e Pain (Persian: ورنام پائين, also Romanized as Varnām-e Pā’īn; also known as Varnām and Varnām-e Soflá) is a village in Garmab Rural District, Chahardangeh District, Sari County, Mazandaran Province, Iran. At the 2006 census, its population was 116, in 24 families. In 2016, its population was 99, in 39 households.
