= Chaharkuh Rural District =

Rural district in Golestan province, Iran

Chaharkuh Rural District Persian: دهستان چهاركوه
- Rural District
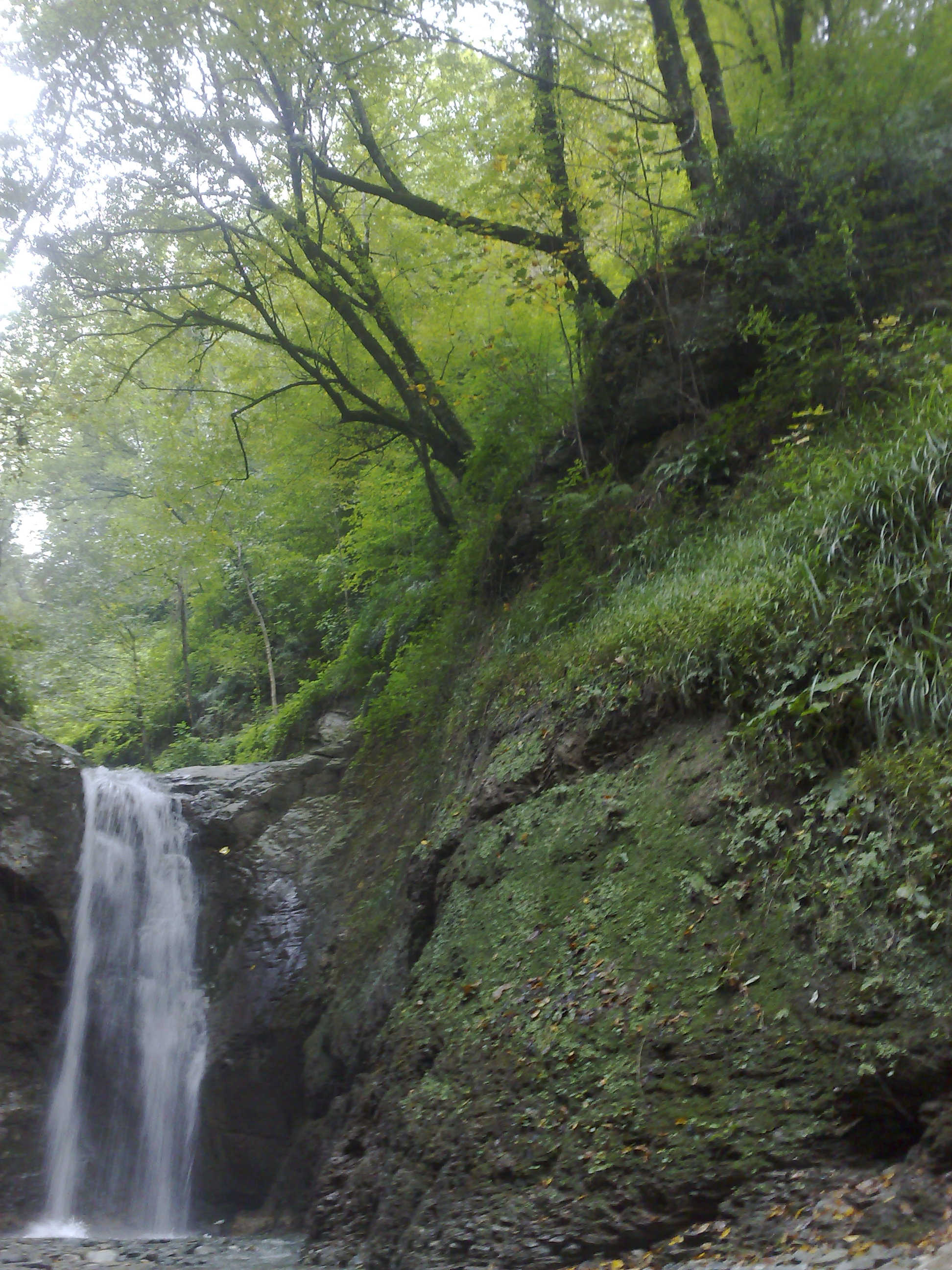
- A waterfall in Chaharkuh RD

- Location within Iran
- Coordinates: 36°40′58″N 54°12′04″E
- Country: Iran
- Province: Golestan
- County: Kordkuy
- District: Central
- Established: 1987
- Capital: Sar Kalateh-ye Kharab Shahr

Population (2016)
  - Total: 5,729
- Time zone: UTC+3:30 (IRST)

Chaharkuh Rural District (Persian: دهستان چهاركوه) is in the Central District of Kordkuy County, Golestan province, Iran. Its capital is the village of Sar Kalateh-ye Kharab Shahr.

== Demographics ==
=== Population ===
At the time of the 2006 National Census, the rural district's population was 11,685 in 3,002 households. There were 5,527 inhabitants in 1,647 households at the following census of 2011. The 2016 census measured the population of the rural district as 5,729 in 1,866 households. The most populous of its 13 villages was Sar Kalateh-ye Kharab Shahr, with 2,680 people.

=== Other villages in the rural district ===
- Chaman Saver
- Daraz-e Now
- Hajjiabad
- Hajjiabad-e Kuh Payeh
- Jahan Nama
- Kond Ab
- Radkan
- Sali Kandeh
- Yazdan Mahalleh
