= Mazdeh, Mazandaran =

Mazdeh مزده
- Village
- Location within Iran
- Coordinates: 36°24′46″N 53°25′34″E
- Country: Iran
- Province: Mazandaran
- County: Sari
- Bakhsh: Chahardangeh
- Rural District: Garmab

Population (2016)
  - Total: 138
- Time zone: UTC+3:30 (IRST)

Mazdeh (Persian: مزده) is a village in Garmab Rural District, Chahardangeh District, Sari County, Mazandaran Province, Iran. At the 2016 census, its population was 138, in 48 families. Down from 200 people in 2006.
