= Kordkuy County =

County in Golestan province, Iran

Kordkuy County Persian: شهرستان کردکوی
- County
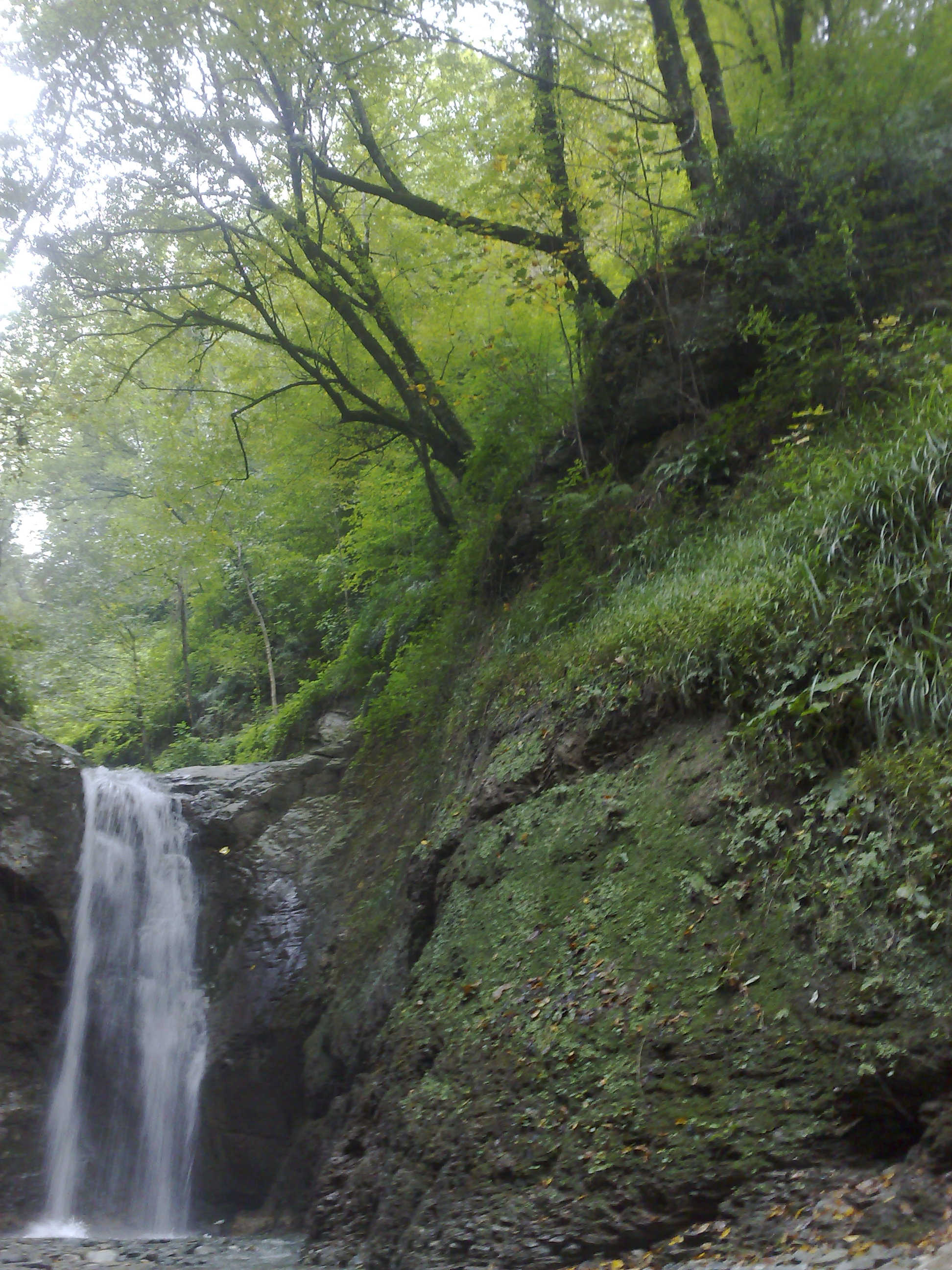
- Waterfall in Kordkuy County

- Location of Kordkuy County in Golestan province (bottom left, green)

- Location of Golestan province in Iran
- Coordinates: 36°44′N 54°13′E
- Country: Iran
- Province: Golestan
- Capital: Kordkuy
- Districts: Central

Population (2016)
  - Total: 71,270
- Time zone: UTC+3:30 (IRST)

Kordkuy County (Persian: شهرستان کردکوی) is in Golestan province, Iran. Its capital is the city of Kordkuy.

== Demographics ==
=== Population ===
At the time of the 2006 National Census, the county's population was 67,427 in 17,617 households. The following census in 2011 counted 70,244 people in 21,100 households. The 2016 census measured the population of the county as 71,270 in 23,510 households.

=== Administrative divisions ===
Kordkuy County's population history and administrative structure over three consecutive censuses are shown in the following table.

Kordkuy County Population
Administrative Divisions	2006	2011	2016
Central District	67,427	70,244	71,270
Chaharkuh RD	11,685	5,527	5,729
Sadan Rostaq-e Gharbi RD	11,165	10,862	10,681
Sadan Rostaq-e Sharqi RD	15,586	15,609	14,979
Kordkuy (city)	28,991	38,246	39,881
Total	67,427	70,244	71,270
RD = Rural District

== See also ==
Media related to Kordkuy County at Wikimedia Commons
