= Central District (Kordkuy County) =

District in Golestan province, Iran

Central District (Kordkuy County) Persian: بخش مرکزی شهرستان کردکوی
- District
- Location within Iran
- Coordinates: 36°44′N 54°13′E
- Country: Iran
- Province: Golestan
- County: Kordkuy
- Capital: Kordkuy

Population (2016)
  - Total: 71,270
- Time zone: UTC+3:30 (IRST)

The Central District of Kordkuy County (Persian: بخش مرکزی شهرستان کردکوی) is in Golestan province, Iran. Its capital is the city of Kordkuy.

== Demographics ==
=== Population ===
At the time of the 2006 National Census, the district's population was 67,427 in 17,617 households. The following census in 2011 counted 70,244 people in 21,100 households. The 2016 census measured the population of the district as 71,270 inhabitants in 23,510 households.

=== Administrative divisions ===
Central District (Kordkuy County) Population
Administrative Divisions	2006	2011	2016
Chaharkuh RD	11,685	5,527	5,729
Sadan Rostaq-e Gharbi RD	11,165	10,862	10,681
Sadan Rostaq-e Sharqi RD	15,586	15,609	14,979
Kordkuy (city)	28,991	38,246	39,881
Total	67,427	70,244	71,270
RD = Rural District
