= Alendan lake =

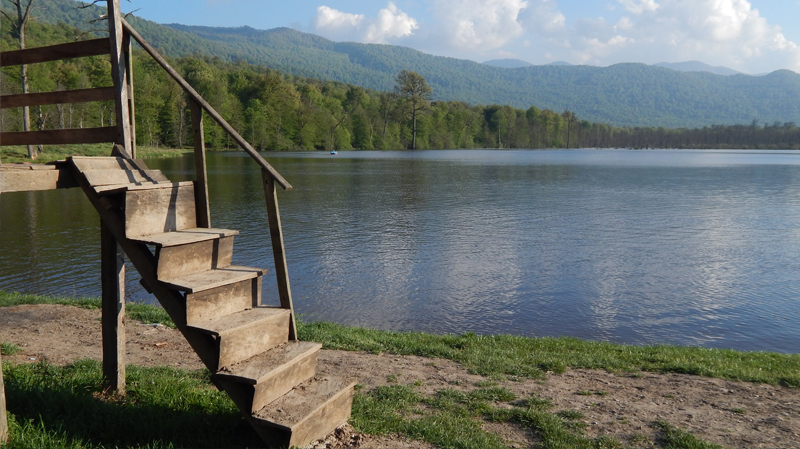
- View of lake in spring

- Location within Iran
- Interactive map of Alendan lake
- Coordinates: 36°13′16″N 53°25′37″E
- Type: lake
- Primary inflows: rain
- Primary outflows: none
- Surface area: 17–30 ha (42–74 acres)
- Settlements: Alendan, Sari

Alendan lake (Persian: دریاچهٔ الندان) is a lake with 17 hectare span located in Sari County. This lake belongs to Quaternary era and has recorded in The national index of Iran in 2015.

This lake is also called Pelle Azni because of the nearby village, Azni. The lake has a 70 km distance from Sari and is located on Sari-Semnan road. (About two hour way from Semnan) The lake is 1200 m higher than sea level.

This lake is the main source of water for paddy fields of near villages like Azni, Mazarostaq, Konta, Didu and Zalam. However no river water comes to the lake, rain full fills the lake.

Plenty of various trees, including Carpinus betulus, oak, Ulmus glabra and Tilia, surrounded the lake.

== Gallery ==
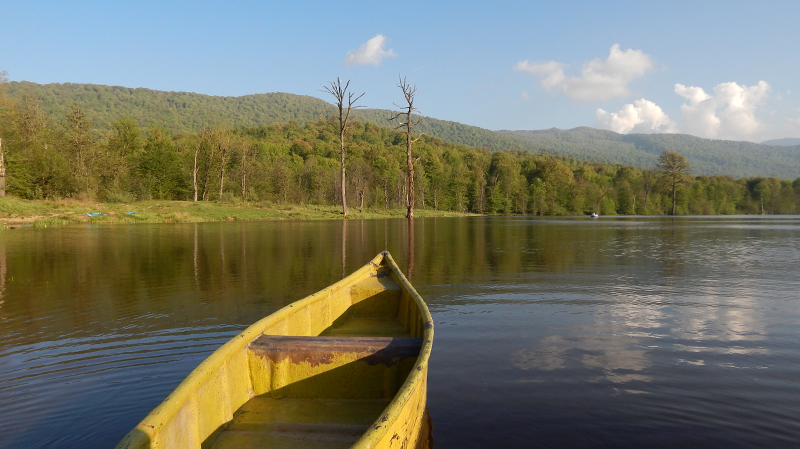

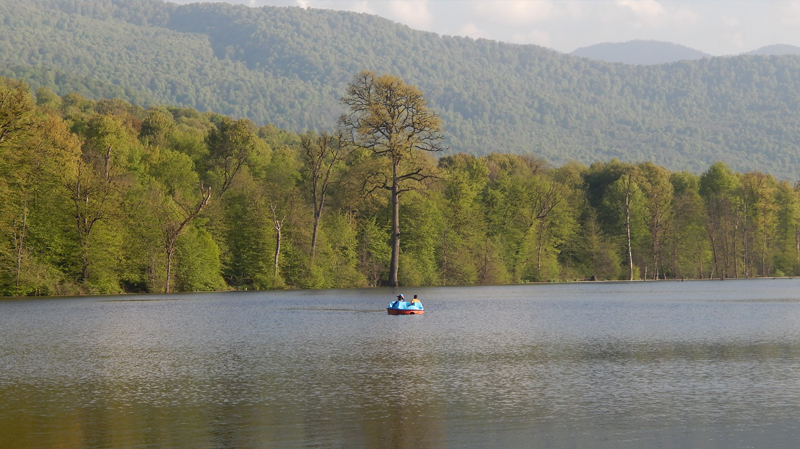

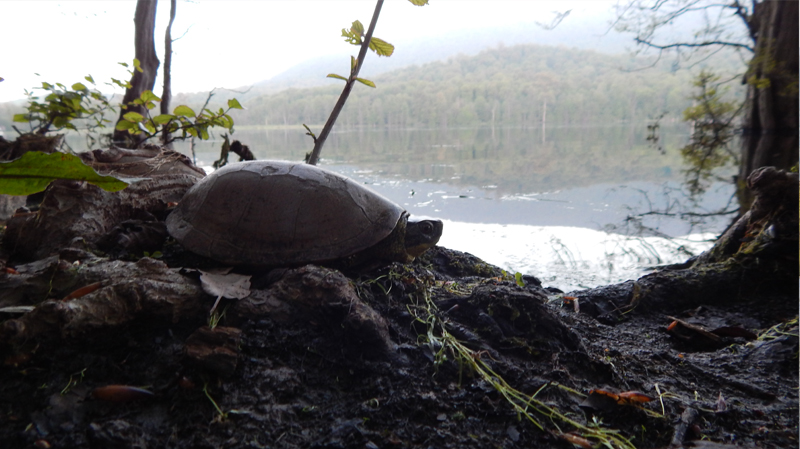

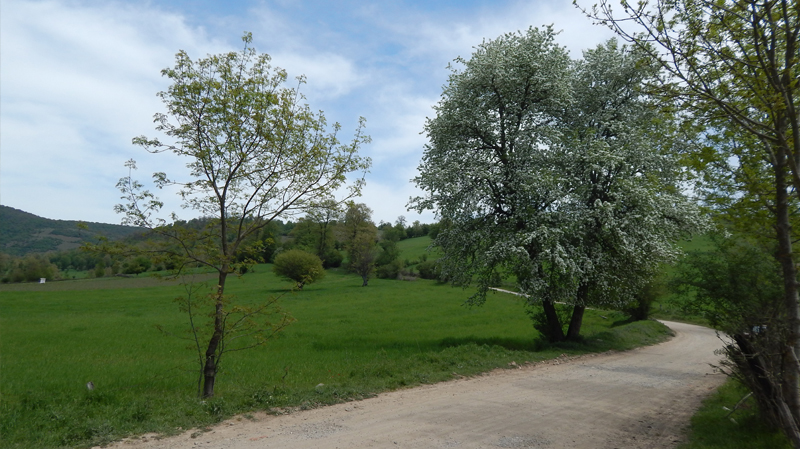

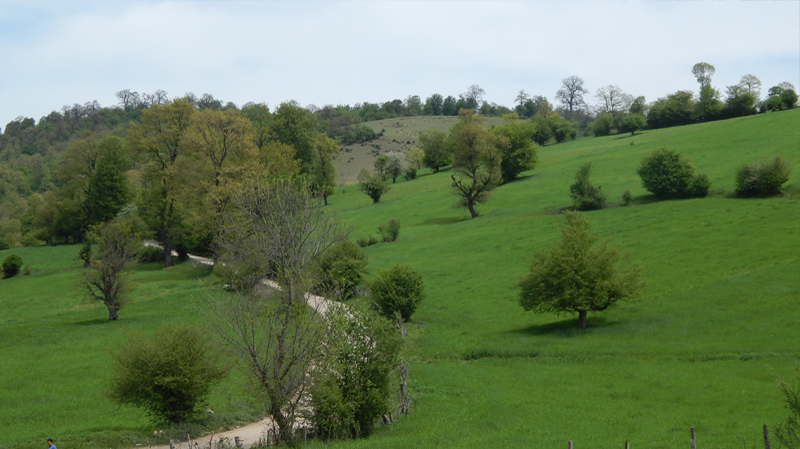

== See also ==
- Lake Urmia
- Dokhaharan lake
