= Tilek =

Tilek تیلک
- Village
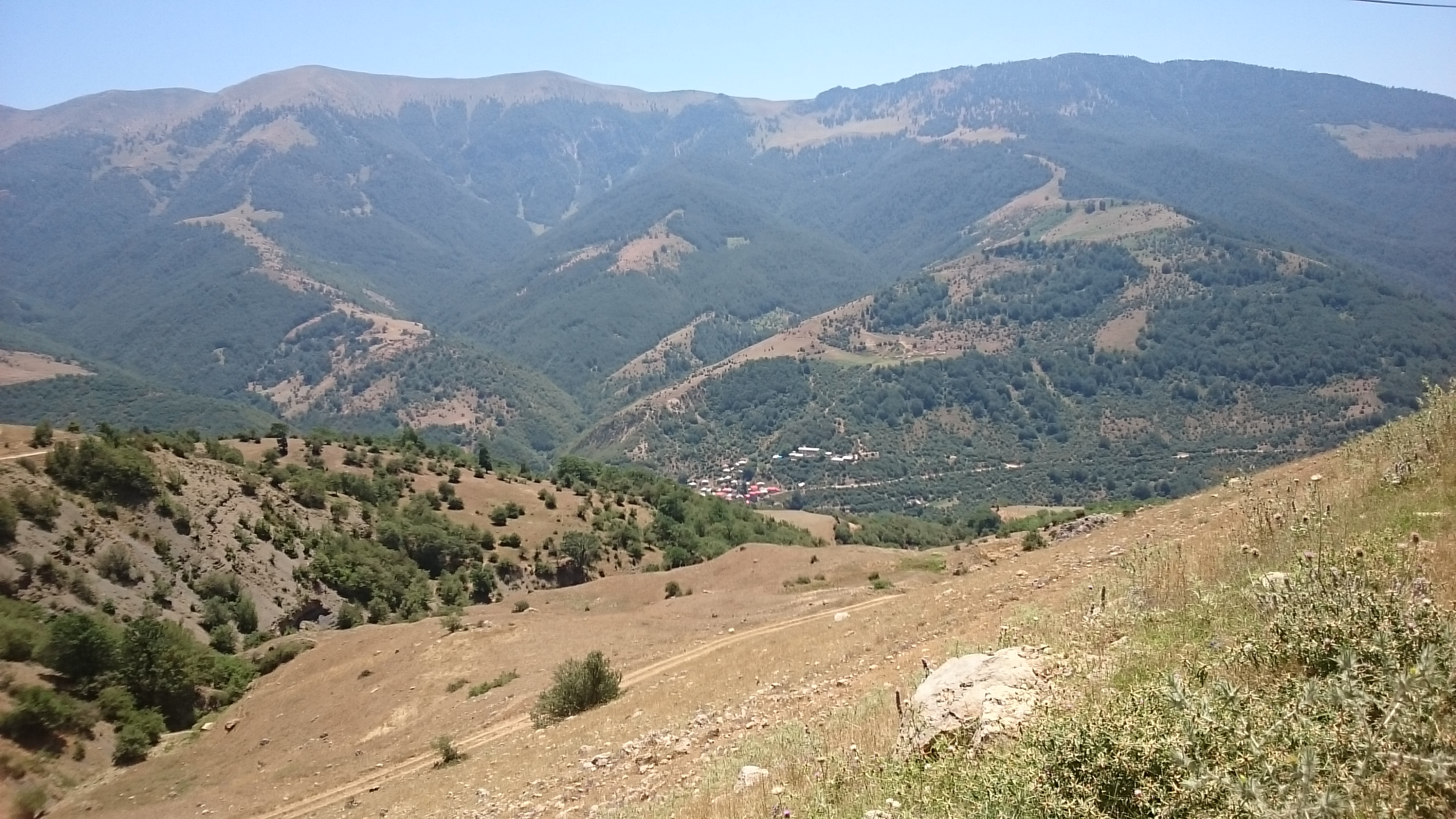
- Tilek village and Chahar Now mountain

- Location within Iran
- Coordinates: 36°07′35″N 53°35′18″E
- Country: Iran
- Province: Mazandaran
- County: Sari
- Bakhsh: Chahardangeh
- Rural District: Chahardangeh
- Elevation: 1,540 m (5,050 ft)

Population (2016)
  - Total: 35
- Time zone: UTC+3:30 (IRST)

Tilek (Persian: تیلک, also Romanized as Tīlek and Tīlak) is a village in Chahardangeh Rural District, Chahardangeh District, Sari County, Mazandaran Province, Iran.

== Demographics ==
At the 2016 census, its population was 35, in 13 families. Decreased from 77 people in 2006. People of Tilek speak the Saravi dialect of Mazanderani language. Their agricultural activities are farming and Animal husbandry. Products include Rice, Grain, Vegetable and Animal product.

Tilek is in the central heights of Eastern Alborz range between Bala Deh and Pain Deh villages to its east and Atini to its west. North of Tilek is Sefid river, a tributary of Tejen river. Tilek is inside the boundary of Dodangeh wildlife refuge.

The Mosque and Hammam of the village were both built during the Qajar period, and were registered as national sights in 2007.
