= Miladasht =

Miladasht میلادشت
- Village
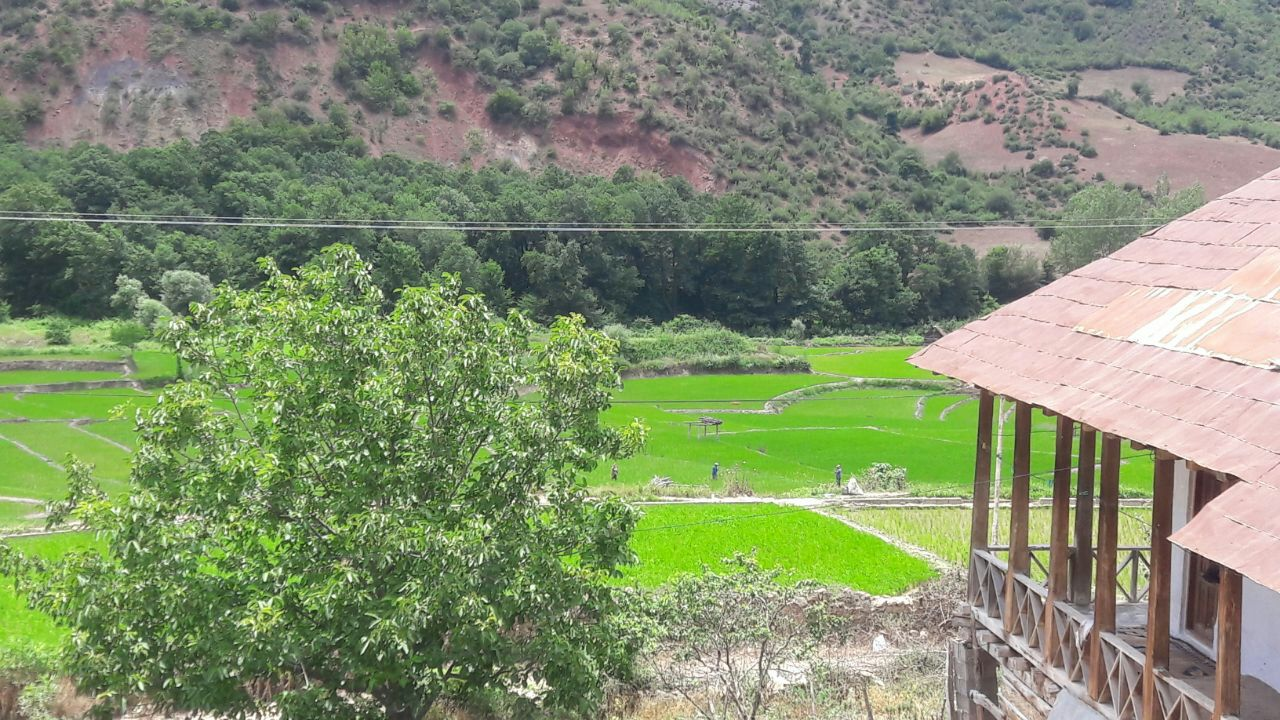
- Miladasht, June 2018

- Location within Iran
- Coordinates: 36.167°N 53.491°E
- Country: Iran
- Province: Mazandaran
- County: Sari
- Bakhsh: Chahardangeh
- Rural District: Chahardangeh

Population (2016)
  - Total: 0
- Time zone: UTC+3:30 (IRST)

Miladasht (Persian: میلادشت) is a mountainous village and yaylak in Chahardangeh Rural District, Chahardangeh District in Sari County, Mazandaran Province, Iran.

== Demographics ==
Population history
Year	Pop.	±%
1976	22	—
2006	not reported	—
2011	0	—
2016	0	0.00%

In the 1976 census, Miladasht was in Narmab-e Dosar Rural District, with limited road access. The village had a population of 22 people in 3 households. It had a Takyeh but didn't have mosque and any other infrastructure.

At the 2006 census, its population was below the reporting threshold of 4 households. The 2011 census reported a permanent population of 0, with villagers settling there from April to September. In 2016 census, the recorded population was 0.
