= Chahar Rudbar =

Chahar Rudbar چهار رودبار
- Village
- Location within Iran
- Coordinates: 36°08′18″N 53°30′03″E
- Country: Iran
- Province: Mazandaran
- County: Sari
- Bakhsh: Chahardangeh
- Rural District: Chahardangeh

Population (2016)
  - Total: 141
- Time zone: UTC+3:30 (IRST)

Chahar Rudbar (Persian: چهاررودبار, also Romanized as Chahār Rūdbār; also known as Chahār Deh-e Rūdbār) is a village in Chahardangeh Rural District, Chahardangeh District, Sari County, Mazandaran Province, Iran. At the 2016 census, its population was 141, in 48 families. Large increase from 28 people in 2006.
