= Mir Afzal-e Vavsar =

Mir Afzal-e Vavsar ميرافضل واوسر
- Village
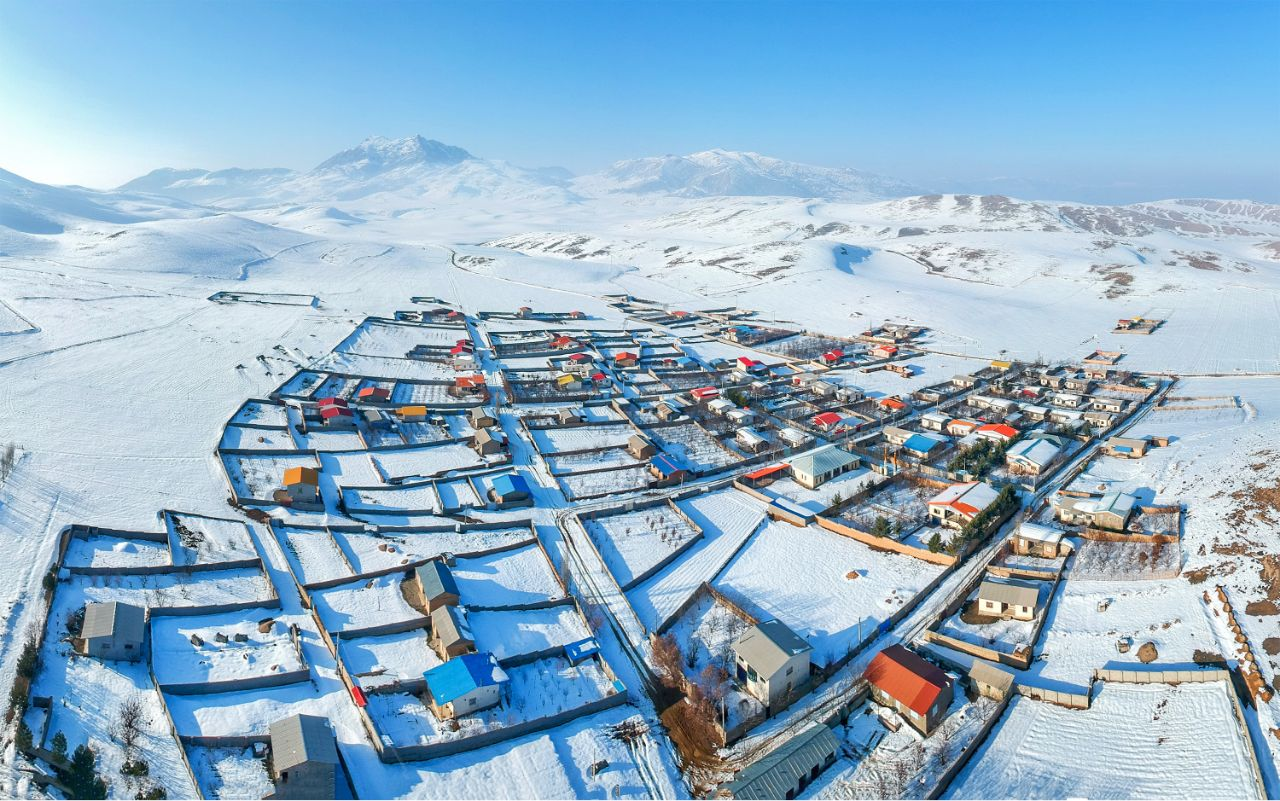
- Aerial view of the Vavsar village in Chardangeh Sari

- Location within Iran
- Coordinates: 36°08′25″N 53°40′16″E
- Country: Iran
- Province: Mazandaran
- County: Sari
- Bakhsh: Chahardangeh
- Rural District: Chahardangeh

Population (2016)
  - Total: 62
- Time zone: UTC+3:30 (IRST)

Mir Afzal-e Vavsar (Persian: ميرافضل واوسر, also Romanized as Mīr Afẕal-e Vāvsar; also known as Mīr Afẕal) is a village in Chahardangeh Rural District, Chahardangeh District, Sari County, Mazandaran Province, Iran. At the 2016 census, its population was 62, in 24 families. Decreased from 138 people in 2006.
