= Konim =

Village in Mazandaran province, Iran

Konim Persian: كنيم
- Village
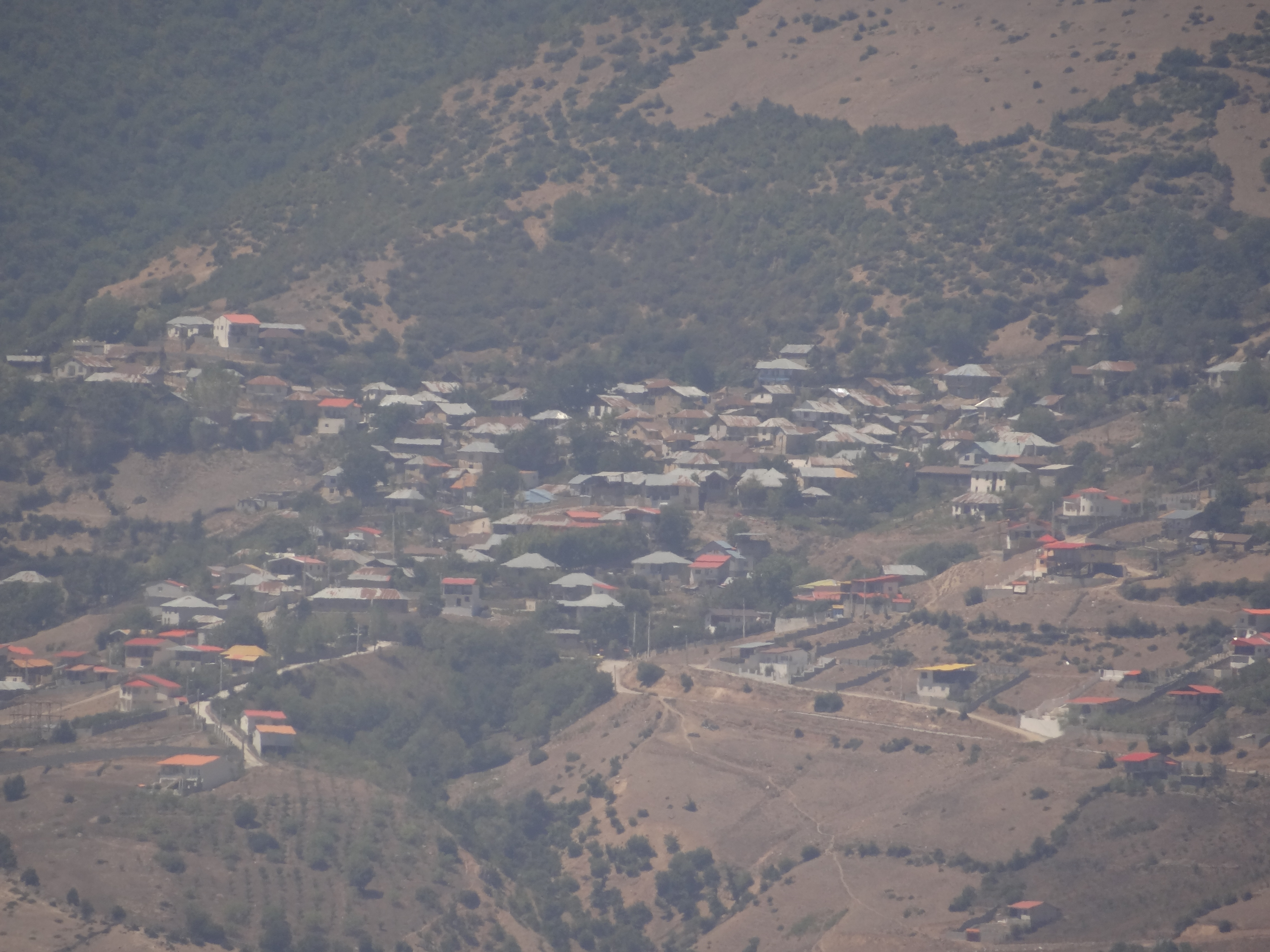
- The village of Konim

- Location within Iran
- Coordinates: 36°16′17″N 53°28′49″E
- Country: Iran
- Province: Mazandaran
- County: Sari
- District: Chahardangeh
- Rural District: Chahardangeh

Population (2016)
  - Total: 338
- Time zone: UTC+3:30 (IRST)

Konim (Persian: كنيم) (Note: Also romanized as Konīm) is a village in Chahardangeh Rural District of Chahardangeh District in Sari County, Mazandaran province, in northern Iran.

== Demographics ==
=== Population ===
At the time of the 2006 National Census, the village's population was 425 in 120 households. The following census in 2011 counted 311 people in 99 households. The 2016 census measured the population of the village as 338 people in 121 households.
