= Kamar Kola =

Kamar Kola كمركلا
- Village
- Location within Iran
- Coordinates: 36°09′53″N 53°27′37″E
- Country: Iran
- Province: Mazandaran
- County: Sari
- Bakhsh: Chahardangeh
- Rural District: Chahardangeh

Population (2016)
  - Total: 18
- Time zone: UTC+3:30 (IRST)

Kamar Kola (Persian: كمركلا, also Romanized as Kamar Kolā) is a village in Chahardangeh Rural District, Chahardangeh District, Sari County, Mazandaran Province, Iran. At the 2006 census, its population was 22, in 7 families. In 2016, its population was 18, in 8 households.
