= Langar, Mazandaran =

Village in Mazandaran province, Iran

Langar Persian: لنگر
- Village
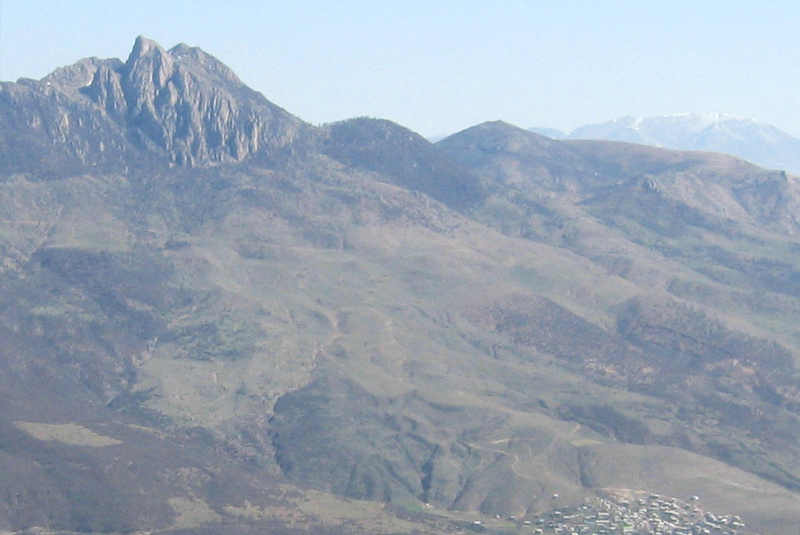
- Shahdezh peak and the village of Langar

- Location within Iran
- Coordinates: 36°12′13″N 53°37′03″E
- Country: Iran
- Province: Mazandaran
- County: Sari
- District: Chahardangeh
- Rural District: Chahardangeh

Population (2016)
  - Total: 216
- Time zone: UTC+3:30 (IRST)

Langar (Persian: لنگر) is a village in Chahardangeh Rural District of Chahardangeh District in Sari County, Mazandaran province, Iran.

== Demographics ==
=== Population ===
At the time of the 2006 National Census, the village's population was 473 in 121 households. The following census in 2011 counted 188 people in 61 households. The 2016 census measured the population of the village as 216 people in 83 households.
