= Lala, Mazandaran =

Village in Mazandaran province, Iran

Lala Persian: لالا
- Village
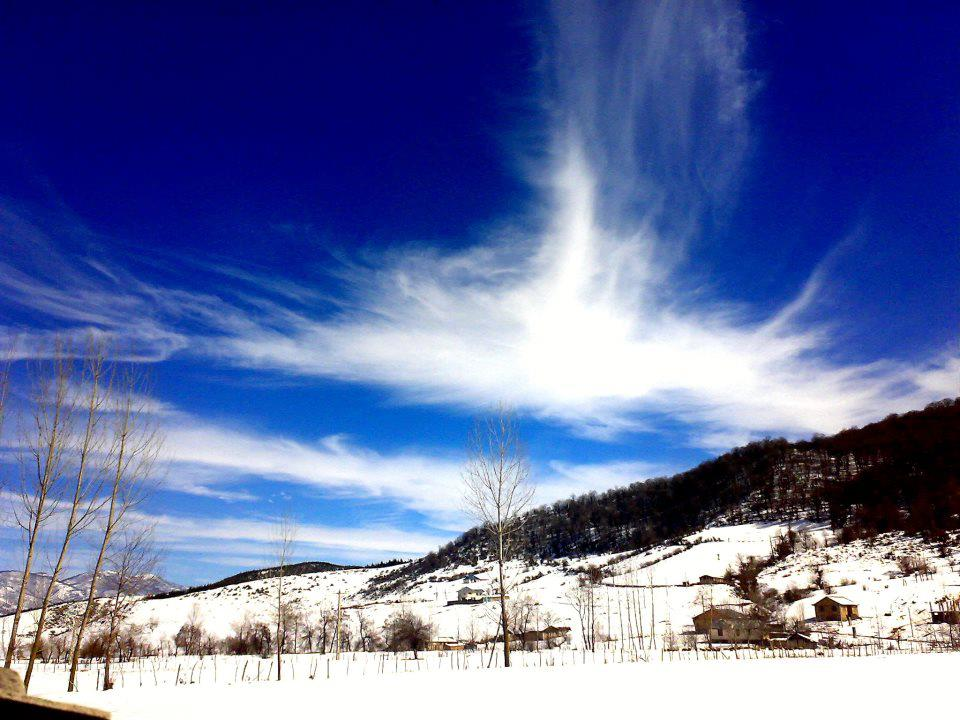
- The village of Lala

- Location within Iran
- Coordinates: 36°13′18″N 53°29′11″E
- Country: Iran
- Province: Mazandaran
- County: Sari
- District: Chahardangeh
- Rural District: Chahardangeh

Population (2016)
  - Total: 293
- Time zone: UTC+3:30 (IRST)

Lala (Persian: لالا) (Note: Also romanized as Lālā; also known as Lāleh Sang) is a village in Chahardangeh Rural District of Chahardangeh District in Sari County, Mazandaran province, Iran.

== Demographics ==
=== Population ===
At the time of the 2006 National Census, the village's population was 279 in 76 households. The following census in 2011 counted 171 people in 48 households. The 2016 census measured the population of the village as 293 people in 100 households.
