= Zakaria Kola =

Zakaria Kola ذكرياكلا
- Village
- Location within Iran
- Coordinates: 36°09′52″N 53°26′35″E
- Country: Iran
- Province: Mazandaran
- County: Sari
- Bakhsh: Chahardangeh
- Rural District: Chahardangeh

Population (2016)
  - Total: 49
- Time zone: UTC+3:30 (IRST)

Zakaria Kola (Persian: ذكرياكلا, also Romanized as Z̄akarīā Kolā and Z̄akarīyā Kolā; also known as Z̄akarīyā Kūlā, Zekarreyā Kolā, and Zekarrīā Kalā) is a village in Chahardangeh Rural District, Chahardangeh District, Sari County, Mazandaran Province, Iran. At the 2006 census, its population was 49, in 23 families. Decreased from 101 people in 2006.
