= Chalu, Sari =

Village in Mazandaran province, Iran

Chalu Persian: چالو
- Village
- Location within Iran
- Coordinates: 36°17′59″N 53°40′23″E
- Country: Iran
- Province: Mazandaran
- County: Sari
- District: Chahardangeh
- Rural District: Chahardangeh

Population (2016)
  - Total: 340
- Time zone: UTC+3:30 (IRST)

Chalu (Persian: چالو) (Note: Also romanized as Chālū) is a village in Chahardangeh Rural District of Chahardangeh District in Sari County, Mazandaran province, Iran.

== Demographics ==
=== Population ===
At the time of the 2006 National Census, the village's population was 589 in 135 households. The following census in 2011 counted 354 people in 123 households. The 2016 census measured the population of the village as 340 people in 128 households, the most populous in its rural district.
