= Rosbaram =

Rosbaram رسبرم
- Village
- Interactive map of Rosbaram
- Coordinates: 36°14′58.430″N 53°24′9.421″E
- Country: Iran
- Province: Mazandaran
- County: Sari
- Bakhsh: Chahardangeh
- Rural District: Chahardangeh

Population (2006)
  - Total: 34
- Time zone: UTC+3:30 (IRST)

Rosbaram (Persian: رسبرم) is a village in Chahardangeh Rural District, Chahardangeh District, Sari County, Mazandaran Province, Iran. At the 2016 census, its population was 18, in ten families. Decreased from 34 people in 2006.
