= Tarkam =

Village in Mazandaran province, Iran

Tarkam Persian: تركام
- Village
- Location within Iran
- Coordinates: 36°13′39″N 53°36′40″E
- Country: Iran
- Province: Mazandaran
- County: Sari
- District: Chahardangeh
- Rural District: Chahardangeh

Population (2016)
  - Total: 211
- Time zone: UTC+3:30 (IRST)

Tarkam (Persian: تركام) (Note: Also romanized as Tarkām, Ter Kām, and Terkām) is a village in Chahardangeh Rural District of Chahardangeh District in Sari County, Mazandaran province, Iran.

== Demographics ==
=== Population ===
At the time of the 2006 National Census, the village's population was 180 in 44 households. The following census in 2011 counted 163 people in 52 households. The 2016 census measured the population of the village as 211 people in 74 households.
