= Kiadeh, Mazandaran =

Kiadeh كياده
- Village
- Location within Iran
- Coordinates: 36°13′28″N 53°28′21″E
- Country: Iran
- Province: Mazandaran
- County: Sari
- Bakhsh: Chahardangeh
- Rural District: Chahardangeh

Population (2016)
  - Total: 54
- Time zone: UTC+3:30 (IRST)

Kiadeh (Persian: كياده, also Romanized as Kīādeh, Keyā Deh, and Kīyā Deh) is a village in Chahardangeh Rural District, Chahardangeh District, Sari County, Mazandaran Province, Iran. At the 2016 census, its population was 54, in 19 families. Up from 40 in 2006.
