= Alendan =

Village in Mazandaran province, Iran

Alendan Persian: الندان
- Village
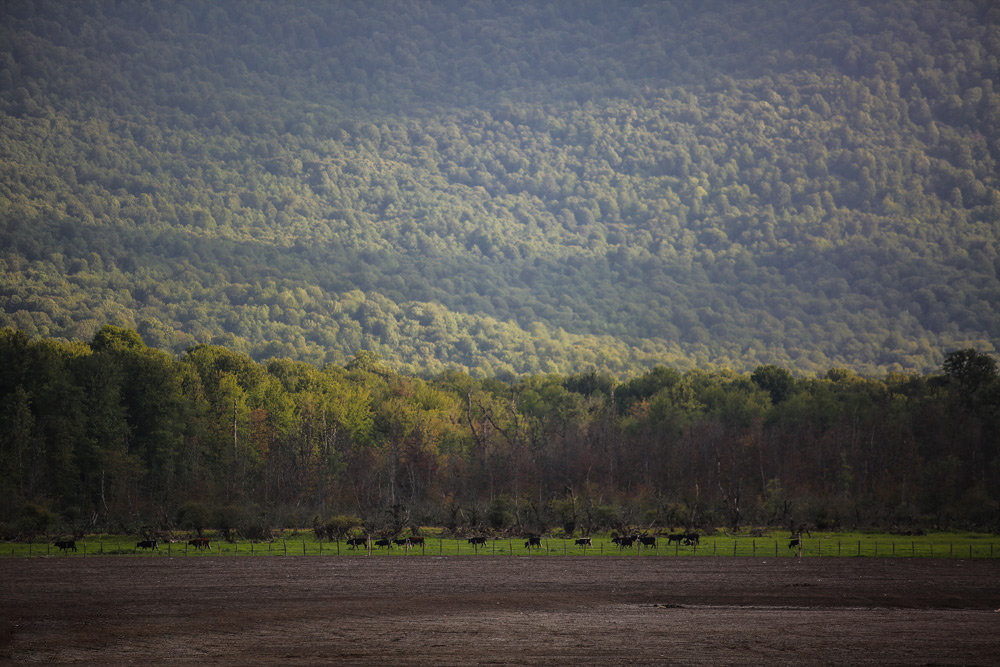
- Alendan Lake is an important natural water source near the village

- Location within Iran
- Coordinates: 36°13′32″N 53°27′35″E
- Country: Iran
- Province: Mazandaran
- County: Sari
- District: Chahardangeh
- Rural District: Chahardangeh

Population (2016)
  - Total: 329
- Time zone: UTC+3:30 (IRST)

Alendan (Persian: الندان) (Note: Also romanized as Alandan, Alandān, and Alendān; also known as ‘Alamdān) is a village in Chahardangeh Rural District of Chahardangeh District in Sari County, Mazandaran province, Iran.

== Demographics ==
=== Population ===
At the time of the 2006 National Census, the village's population was 319 in 89 households. The following census in 2011 counted 241 people in 72 households. The 2016 census measured the population of the village as 329 people in 115 households.
