= Rudbar-e Edru =

Rudbar-e Edru رودبارادرو
- Village
- Location within Iran
- Coordinates: 36°08′54″N 53°31′44″E
- Country: Iran
- Province: Mazandaran
- County: Sari
- Bakhsh: Chahardangeh
- Rural District: Chahardangeh

Population (2006)
  - Total: 151
- Time zone: UTC+3:30 (IRST)

Rudbar-e Edru (Persian: رودبارادرو, also Romanized as Rūdbār-e Edrū; also known as Rūdbār) is a village in Chahardangeh Rural District, Chahardangeh District, Sari County, Mazandaran Province, Iran. At the 2006 census, its population was 151, in 37 families. Decreased to 97 people in 2016.
