= Gel Jari =

Gel Jari گل جاری
- Village
- Location within Iran
- Coordinates: 36°17′31″N 53°34′09″E
- Country: Iran
- Province: Mazandaran
- County: Sari
- Bakhsh: Chahardangeh
- Rural District: Chahardangeh

Population (2016)
  - Total: 33
- Time zone: UTC+3:30 (IRST)

Gel Jari (Persian: گل جاری, also Romanized as Gel Jārī and Gol Jārī) is a village in Chahardangeh Rural District, Chahardangeh District, Sari County, Mazandaran Province, Iran. At the 2006 census, its population was 33, in 12 families. Up from 31 in 2006.
