= Eskard =

Eskard اسكارد
- Village
- Location within Iran
- Coordinates: 36°16′19″N 53°26′24″E
- Country: Iran
- Province: Mazandaran
- County: Sari
- Bakhsh: Chahardangeh
- Rural District: Chahardangeh

Population (2016)
  - Total: 57
- Time zone: UTC+3:30 (IRST)

Eskard (Persian: اسكارد, also Romanized as Eskārd) is a village in Chahardangeh Rural District, Chahardangeh District, Sari County, Mazandaran Province, Iran. At the 2006 census, its population was 61, in 26 families. Down to 57 people and 25 households in 2016.
