= Vari, Iran =

Vari وری
- Village

- Location within Iran
- Coordinates: 36°16′13″N 53°30′36″E
- Country: Iran
- Province: Mazandaran
- County: Sari
- Bakhsh: Chahardangeh
- Rural District: Chahardangeh

Population (2016)
  - Total: 167
- Time zone: UTC+3:30 (IRST)

Vari (Persian: وری, also Romanized as Varī) is a village in Chahardangeh Rural District, Chahardangeh District, Sari County, Mazandaran Province, Iran. At the 2016 census, its population was 167, in 77 families.
