= Senam =

Senam سنام
- Village
- Location within Iran
- Coordinates: 36°11′22″N 53°29′16″E
- Country: Iran
- Province: Mazandaran
- County: Sari
- Bakhsh: Chahardangeh
- Rural District: Chahardangeh

Population (2016)
  - Total: 111
- Time zone: UTC+3:30 (IRST)

Senam (Persian: سنام, also Romanized as Senām) is a village in Chahardangeh Rural District, Chahardangeh District, Sari County, Mazandaran Province, Iran. At the 2006 census, its population was 111, in 44 families. Increased from 58 people in 2006.
