= Ki Kola =

Ki Kola كي كلا
- Village
- Location within Iran
- Coordinates: 36°14′00″N 53°38′00″E
- Country: Iran
- Province: Mazandaran
- County: Sari
- Bakhsh: Chahardangeh
- Rural District: Chahardangeh

Population (2016)
  - Total: 53
- Time zone: UTC+3:30 (IRST)

Ki Kola (Persian: كي كلا, also Romanized as Kī Kolā; also known as Kīā Kolā) is a village in Chahardangeh Rural District, Chahardangeh District, Sari County, Mazandaran Province, Iran. At the 2016 census, its population was 53, in 20 families. Down from 59 in 2006.
