= Gol Bagh =

Gol Bagh گل باغ
- Village
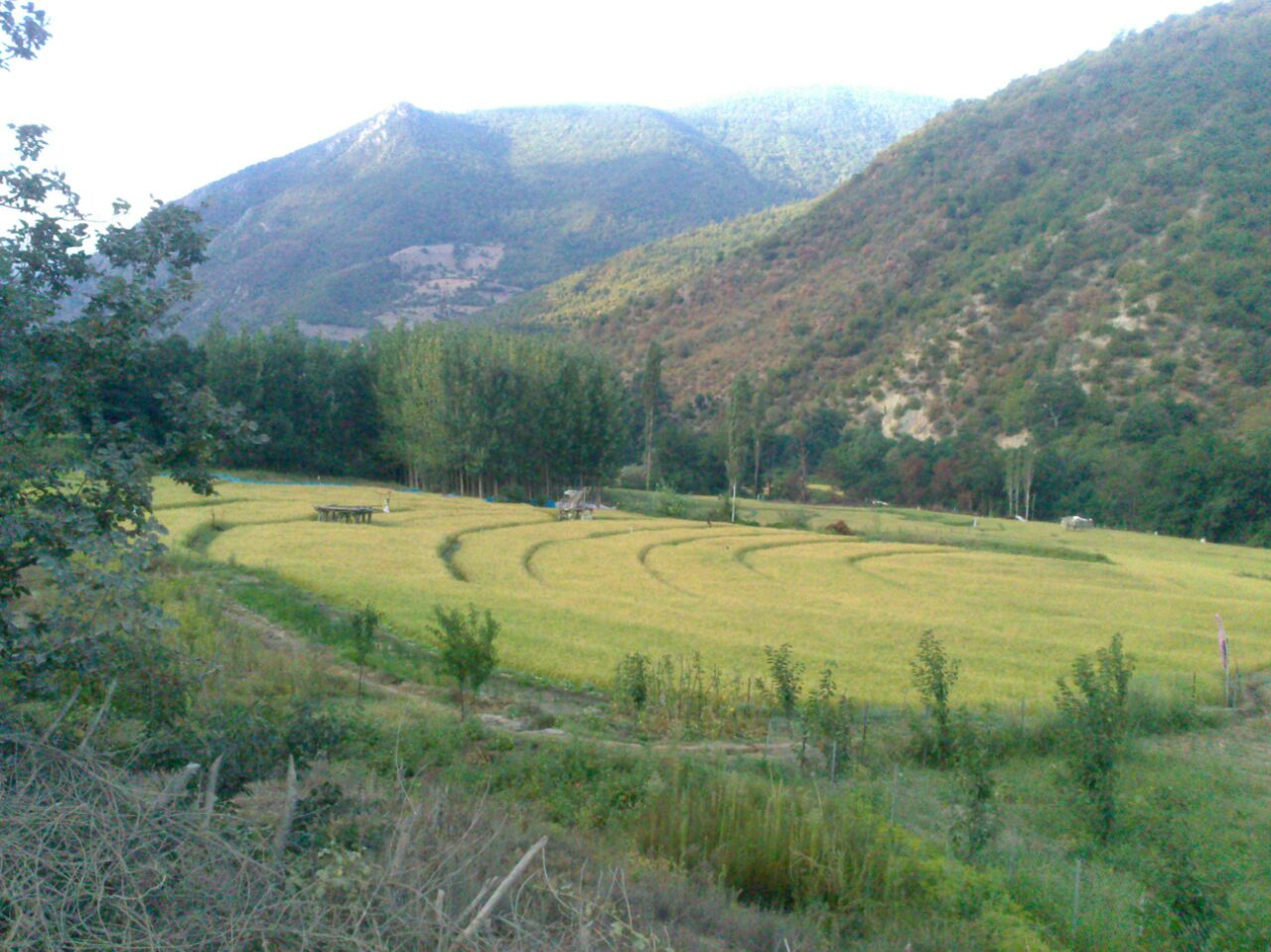

- Location within Iran
- Coordinates: 36°09′39″N 53°30′01″E
- Country: Iran
- Province: Mazandaran
- County: Sari
- Bakhsh: Chahardangeh
- Rural District: Chahardangeh

Population (2006)
  - Total: 11
- Time zone: UTC+3:30 (IRST)

Gol Bagh (Persian: گل باغ, also Romanized as Gol Bāgh) is a village in Chahardangeh Rural District, Chahardangeh District, Sari County, Mazandaran Province, Iran. At the 2006 census, its population was 11, in 6 families.

At the time of 2011 and 2016 census results, there were less than 4 families residing in the village. Gol Bagh has Electricity connection and tap water, but it does not have a village council and any school.
