= Aghuz Galleh =

Aghuz Galleh آغوزگله
- Village
- Location within Iran
- Coordinates: 36°09′30″N 53°32′30″E
- Country: Iran
- Province: Mazandaran
- County: Sari
- Bakhsh: Chahardangeh
- Rural District: Chahardangeh

Population (2016)
  - Total: 98
- Time zone: UTC+3:30 (IRST)

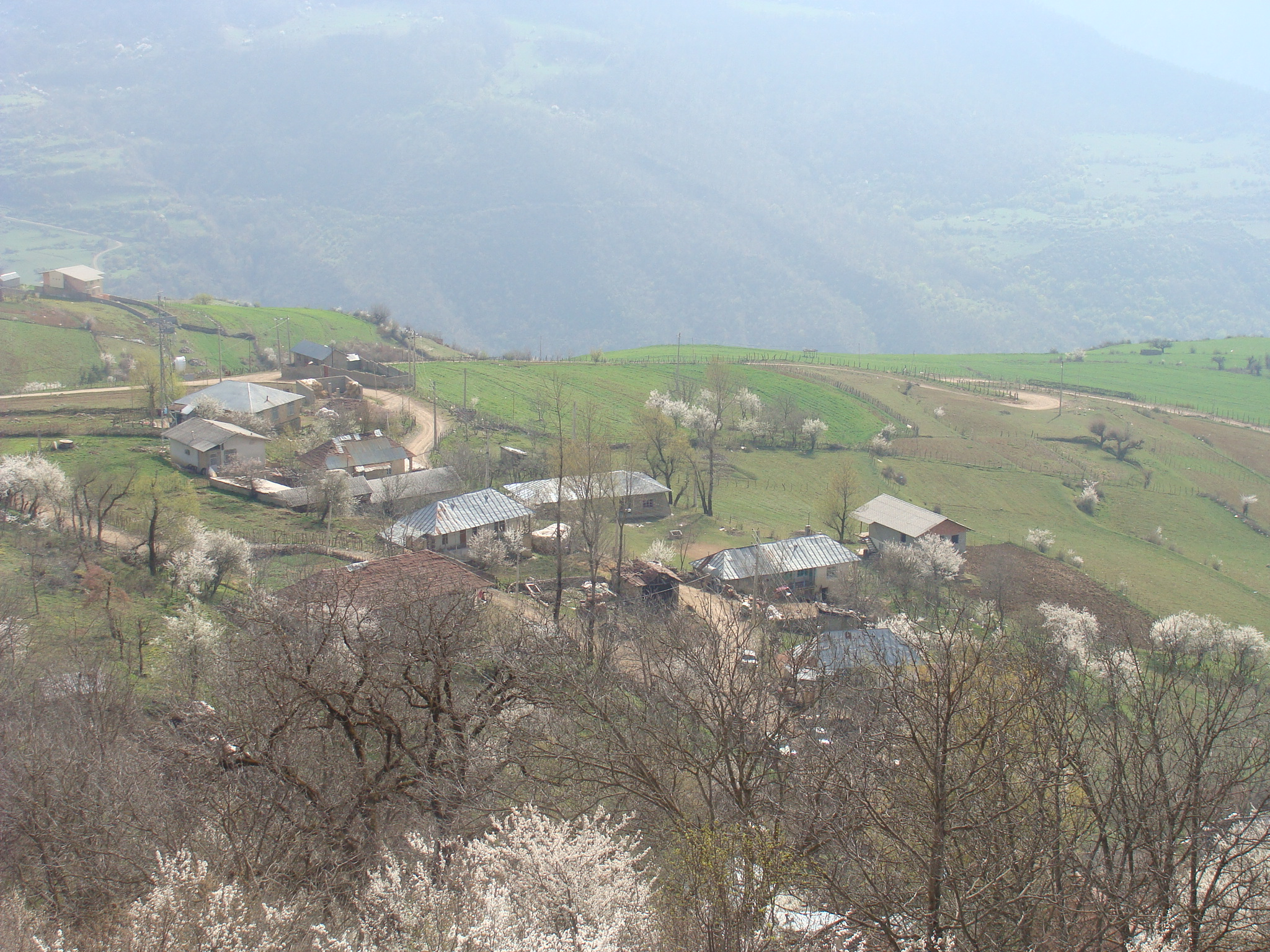
Aghuz Galleh

Aghuz Galleh (Persian: آغوزگله, also Romanized as Āghūz Galleh) is a village in Chahardangeh Rural District, Chahardangeh District, Sari County, Mazandaran Province, Iran. At the 2006 census, its population was 98, in 40 families. Decreased from 272 people in 2006.
