= Gandab, Mazandaran =

Gandab گنداب
- Village
- Country: Iran
- Province: Mazandaran
- County: Sari
- Bakhsh: Chahardangeh
- Rural District: Chahardangeh

Population (2006)
  - Total: 96
- Time zone: UTC+3:30 (IRST)

Gandab (Persian: گنداب, also Romanized as Gandāb) is a village in Chahardangeh Rural District, Chahardangeh District, Sari County, Mazandaran Province, Iran. At the 2006 census, its population was 96, in 32 families. In 2016 the village had no residents.
