= Saidabad, Chahardangeh =

Saidabad سعید آباد
- Village
- Location within Iran
- Coordinates: 36°10′25″N 53°28′30″E
- Country: Iran
- Province: Mazandaran
- County: Sari
- Bakhsh: Chahardangeh
- Rural District: Chahardangeh

Population (2016)
  - Total: 89
- Time zone: UTC+3:30 (IRST)

Saidabad (Persian: سعيدآباد, also Romanized as Sa‘īdābād) is a village in Chahardangeh Rural District, Chahardangeh District, Sari County, Mazandaran Province, Iran. At the 2006 census, its population was 89, in 40 families. Down from 155 people in 2006.
