= Jamal ol Din Kola =

Jamal ol Din Kola جمال الدين كلا
- Village
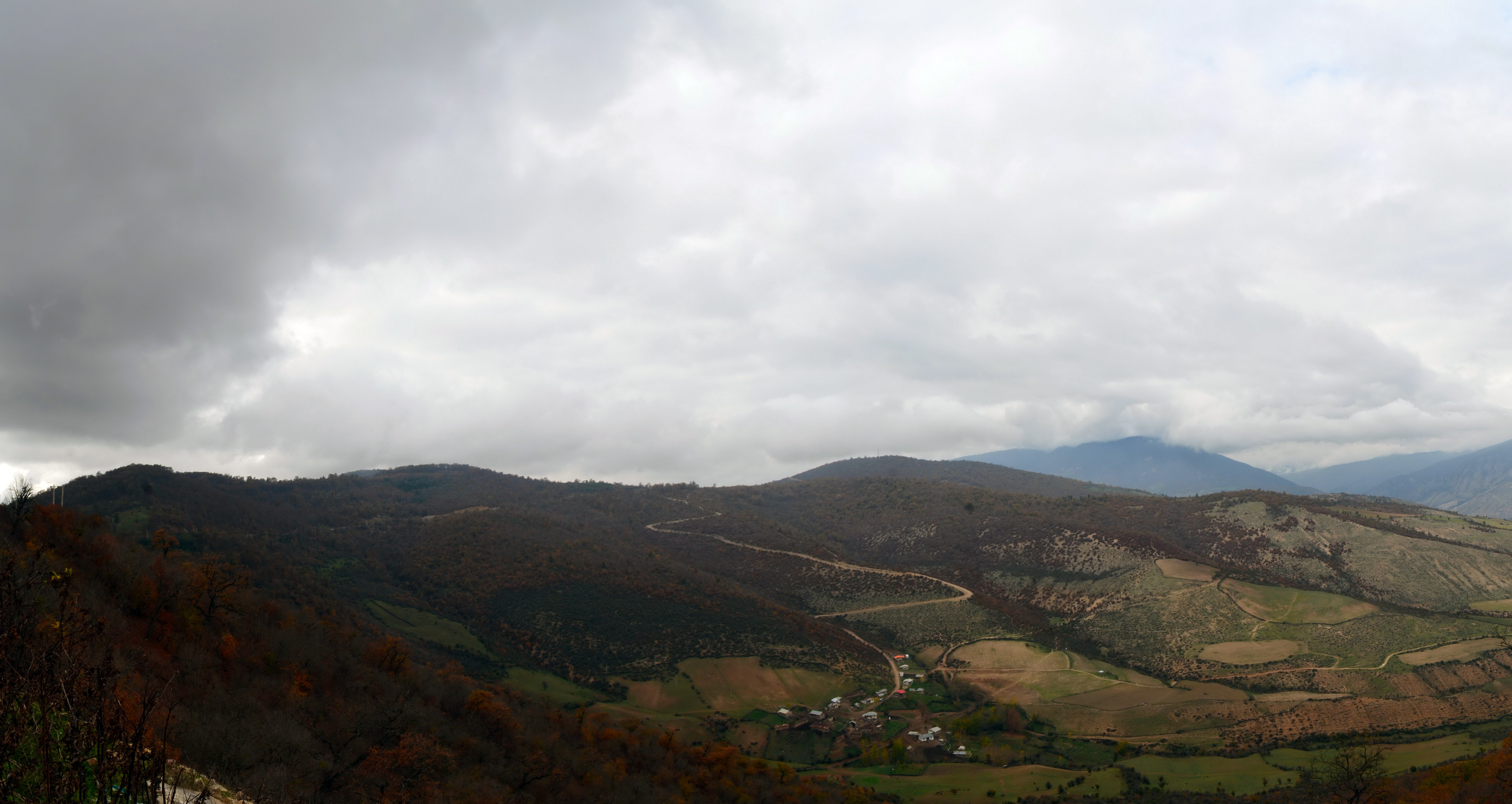

- Location within Iran
- Coordinates: 36°12′00″N 53°34′40″E
- Country: Iran
- Province: Mazandaran
- County: Sari
- Bakhsh: Chahardangeh
- Rural District: Chahardangeh

Population (2006)
  - Total: 106
- Time zone: UTC+3:30 (IRST)

Jamal ol Din Kola (Persian: جمال الدين كلا, also Romanized as Jamāl ol Dīn Kolā, Jalāl Ed Dīn Kolā, Jalāl od Dīn Kalā, Jamāl ed Dīn Kolā, and Jamāl od Dīn Kolā) is a village in Chahardangeh Rural District, Chahardangeh District, Sari County, Mazandaran Province, Iran. At the 2016 census, its population was 39, in 17 families. Decreased from 107 people in 2006.
