= Tileh Bon =

Tileh Bon تيله بن
- Village
- Location within Iran
- Coordinates: 36°08′10″N 53°38′13″E
- Country: Iran
- Province: Mazandaran
- County: Sari
- Bakhsh: Chahardangeh
- Rural District: Chahardangeh

Population (2016)
  - Total: 99
- Time zone: UTC+3:30 (IRST)

Tileh Bon (Persian: تيله بن, also Romanized as Tīleh Bon) is a village in Chahardangeh Rural District, Chahardangeh District, Sari County, Mazandaran Province, Iran. At the 2006 census, its population was 99, in 37 families. Up from 49 people in 2006.
