= Sang Cheshmeh =

Sang Cheshmeh سنگ چشمه
- Village
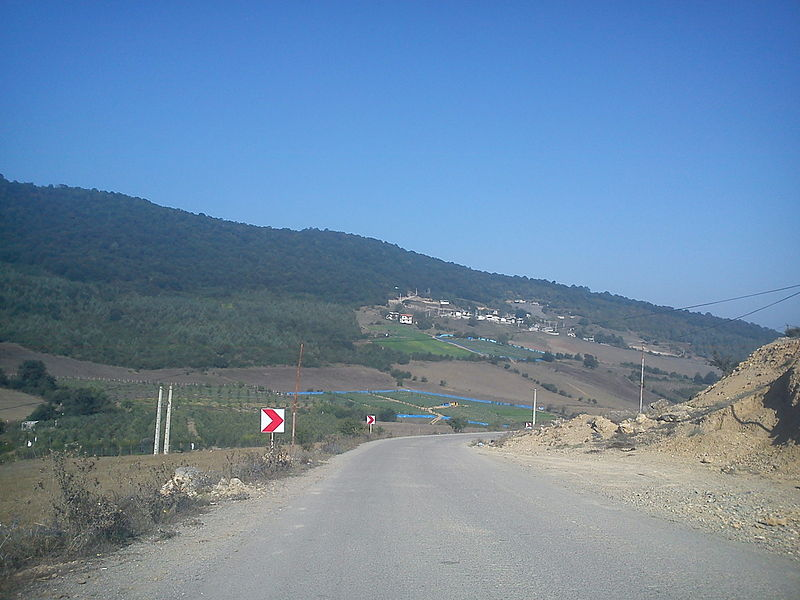
- Village view.

- Location within Iran
- Coordinates: 36°13′08″N 53°30′09″E
- Country: Iran
- Province: Mazandaran
- County: Sari
- Bakhsh: Chahardangeh
- Rural District: Chahardangeh
- Time zone: UTC+3:30 (IRST)

Sang Cheshmeh (Persian: سنگ چشمه) is a village in Chahardangeh Rural District, Chahardangeh District in Sari County, Mazandaran Province, Iran.

== Demographics ==
Population history
Year	Pop.	±%
1966	51	—
1976	57	+11.8%
2006	not reported	—
2016	0	—

At the 2006 census, its existence was noted, but its population was not reported. In 2016 census, there were no households residing in the settlement.
