= Siavash Kola, Sari =

Siavash Kola سياوشكلا
- Village
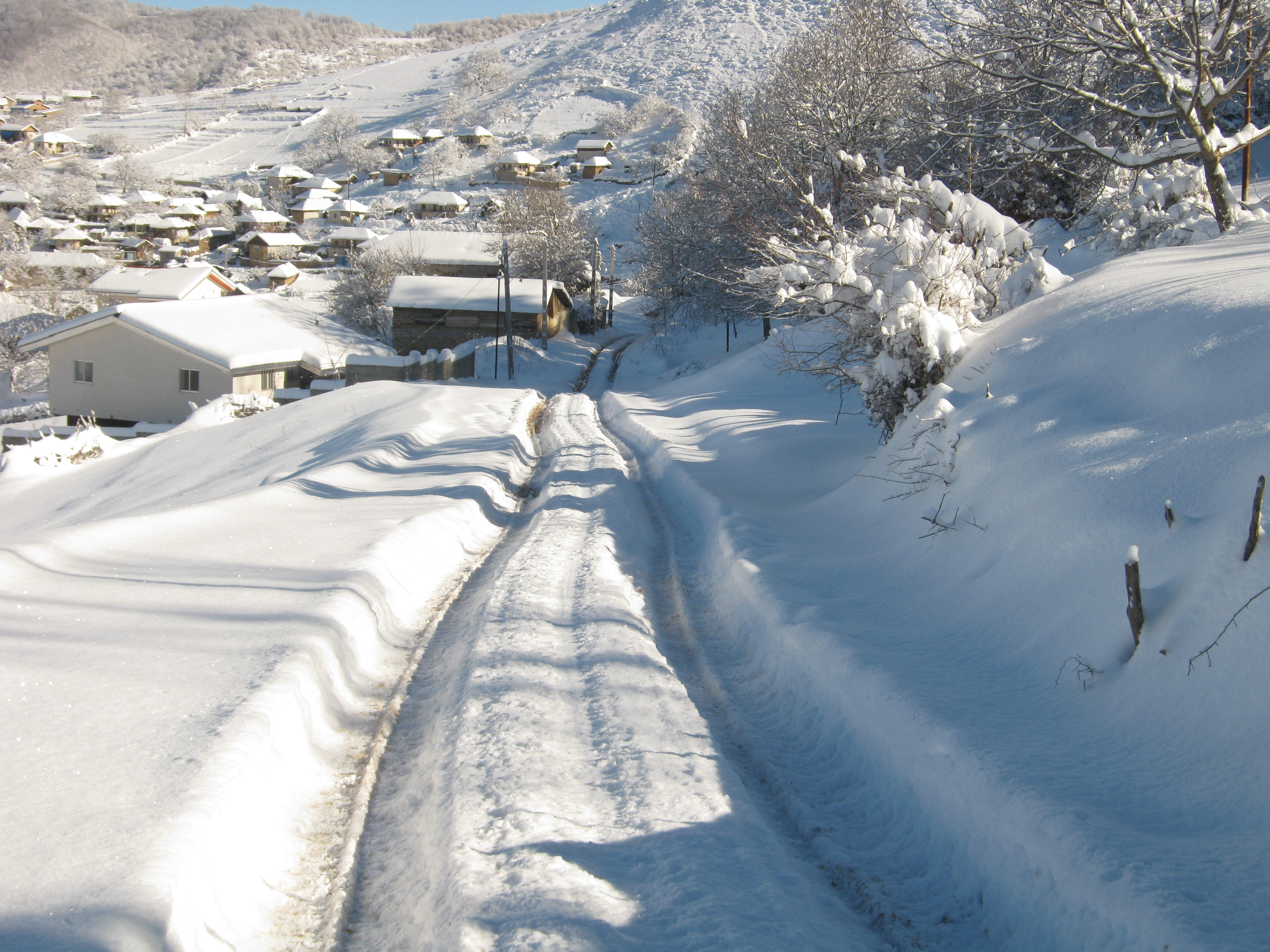

- Location within Iran
- Coordinates: 36°10′14″N 53°31′42″E
- Country: Iran
- Province: Mazandaran
- County: Sari
- Bakhsh: Chahardangeh
- Rural District: Chahardangeh

Population (2016)
  - Total: 133
- Time zone: UTC+3:30 (IRST)

Siavash Kola (Persian: سياوشكلا, also Romanized as Sīāvash Kolā) is a village in Chahardangeh Rural District, Chahardangeh District, Sari County, Mazandaran Province, Iran. At the 2006 census, its population was 133, in 45 families. Up from 105 in 2006.
