= Ilal =

Village in Mazandaran province, Iran

Ilal Persian: ايلال
- Village
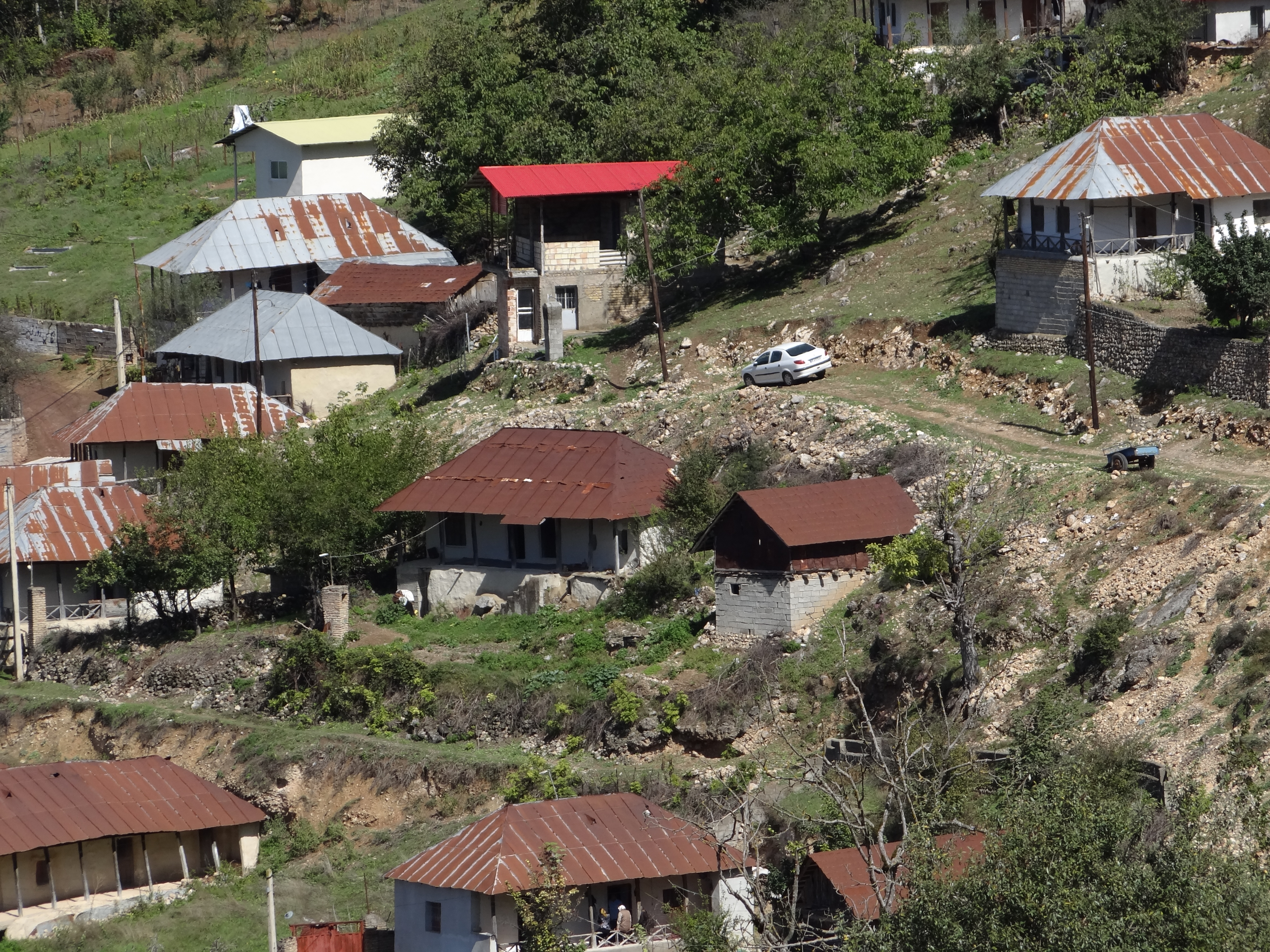
- The village of Ilal

- Location within Iran
- Coordinates: 36°10′19″N 53°31′46″E
- Country: Iran
- Province: Mazandaran
- County: Sari
- District: Chahardangeh
- Rural District: Chahardangeh

Population (2016)
  - Total: 248
- Time zone: UTC+3:30 (IRST)

Ilal (Persian: ايلال) (Note: Also romanized as Īlāl; also known as Īlāt) is a village in Chahardangeh Rural District of Chahardangeh District in Sari County, Mazandaran province, Iran.

== Demographics ==
=== Population ===
At the time of the 2006 National Census, the village's population was 317 in 89 households. The following census in 2011 counted 273 people in 84 households. The 2016 census measured the population of the village as 248 people in 87 households.
