= Talu Kola =

Talu Kola تلوكلا
- Village
- Location within Iran
- Coordinates: 36°14′45″N 53°27′14″E
- Country: Iran
- Province: Mazandaran
- County: Sari
- Bakhsh: Chahardangeh
- Rural District: Chahardangeh

Population (2016)
  - Total: 112
- Time zone: UTC+3:30 (IRST)

Talu Kola (Persian: تلوكلا, also Romanized as Talū Kolā and Talū Kalā; also known as Tālū Kūlā) is a village in Chahardangeh Rural District, Chahardangeh District, Sari County, Mazandaran Province, Iran. At the 2006 census, its population was 111, in 50 families. In 2016, its population was 112, in 49 households.
