= Gol Khvaran =

Gol Khvaran Persian: گل خواران
- Village
- Location within Iran
- Coordinates: 36°8′8.455″N 53°32′7.296″E
- Country: Iran
- Province: Mazandaran
- County: Sari
- District: Chahardangeh
- Rural District: Chahardangeh
- Elevation: 1,300 m (4,300 ft)

Population (2016)
  - Total: 32
- Time zone: UTC+3:30 (IRST)

Gol Khvaran (Persian: گل خواران, also romanized as Gol Khārān) is a village in Chahardangeh District of Sari County, Mazandaran Province, Iran. It was part of the "Narmab-e Dosar" geographical region and rural district.

The village is in the eastern Alborz range at an elevation of 1,300 m (4,300 ft), inside the limit of Dodangeh wildlife refuge, and south of Kiasar national park. Its economy is based on farming and Animal husbandry.

== Demographics ==
Gol Khvaran population history
Year	Pop.	±%
1966	90	—
1976	63	−30.0%
1986	42	−33.3%
2011	47	+11.9%
2016	32	−31.9%

Gol Kharan was one of the poorer villages of the region with no tap water, power connection, or clinic, and its road connection was Gravel road. In 1986 census, Gol Kharan's population was 42, in 14 households and it had elementary school.

At the time of the 2016 census, its population was 32, in 10 households. People of Gol Kharan speak the Saravi dialect of Mazanderani language.
