= Sanur =

Sanur may refer to:

- Sanur, Jenin, a Palestinian town in the northern West Bank
- Sanur, Iran, a village in Mazandaran Province, Iran
- Sa-Nur, a former Israeli settlement
- Sanur, Bali, a beach side village on the southeast side of the Indonesian island of Bali
