= Qaleh, Sari =

Qaleh قلعه
- Village
- Location within Iran
- Coordinates: 36°08′00″N 53°37′20″E
- Country: Iran
- Province: Mazandaran
- County: Sari
- Bakhsh: Chahardangeh
- Rural District: Chahardangeh

Population (2016)
  - Total: 81
- Time zone: UTC+3:30 (IRST)

Qaleh (Persian: قلعه, also Romanized as Qal‘eh) is a village in Chahardangeh Rural District, Chahardangeh District, Sari County, Mazandaran Province, Iran. At the 2016 census, its population was 81, in 30 families. Increased from 25 people in 2006.
