= Band-e Bon, Sari =

Band-e Bon بندبن
- Village
- Location within Iran
- Coordinates: 36°05′49″N 53°31′09″E
- Country: Iran
- Province: Mazandaran
- County: Sari
- Bakhsh: Chahardangeh
- Rural District: Chahardangeh

Population (2006)
  - Total: 114
- Time zone: UTC+3:30 (IRST)

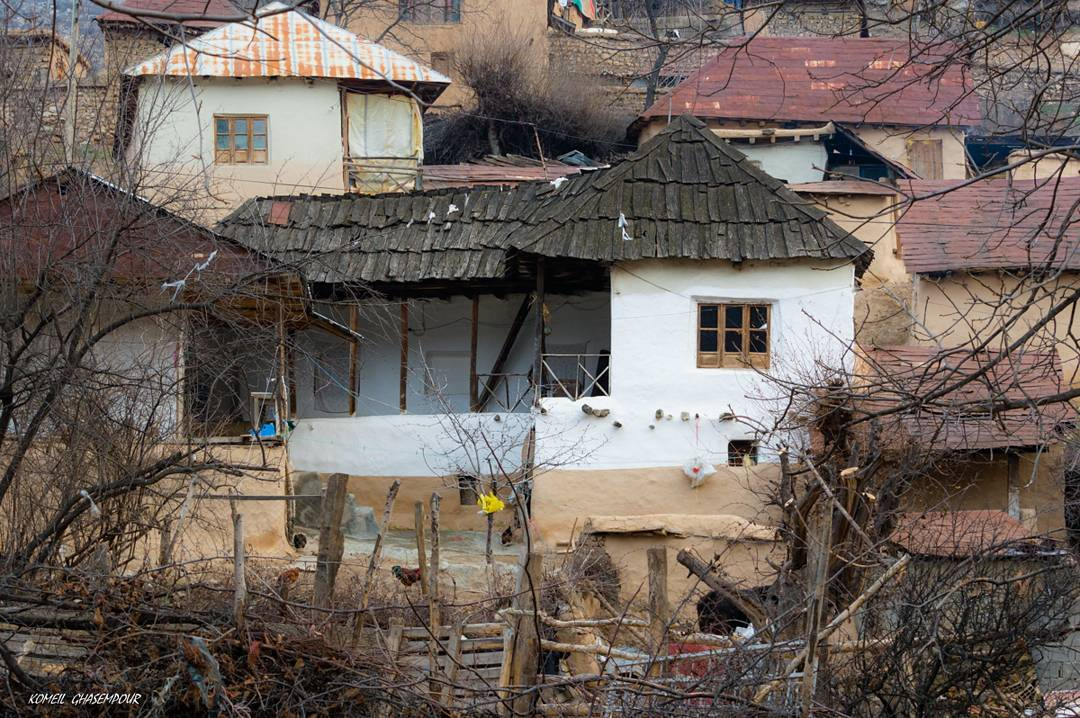
Bandeben kqasempoor

Band-e Bon (Persian: بندبن, also Romanized as Band Bon; also known as Bandīn) is a village in Chahardangeh Rural District, Chahardangeh District, Sari County, Mazandaran Province, Iran. At the 2006 census, its population was 87, in 32 families. Down from 114 people in 2006.
