= Kholard =

Kholerd خلرد
- Village
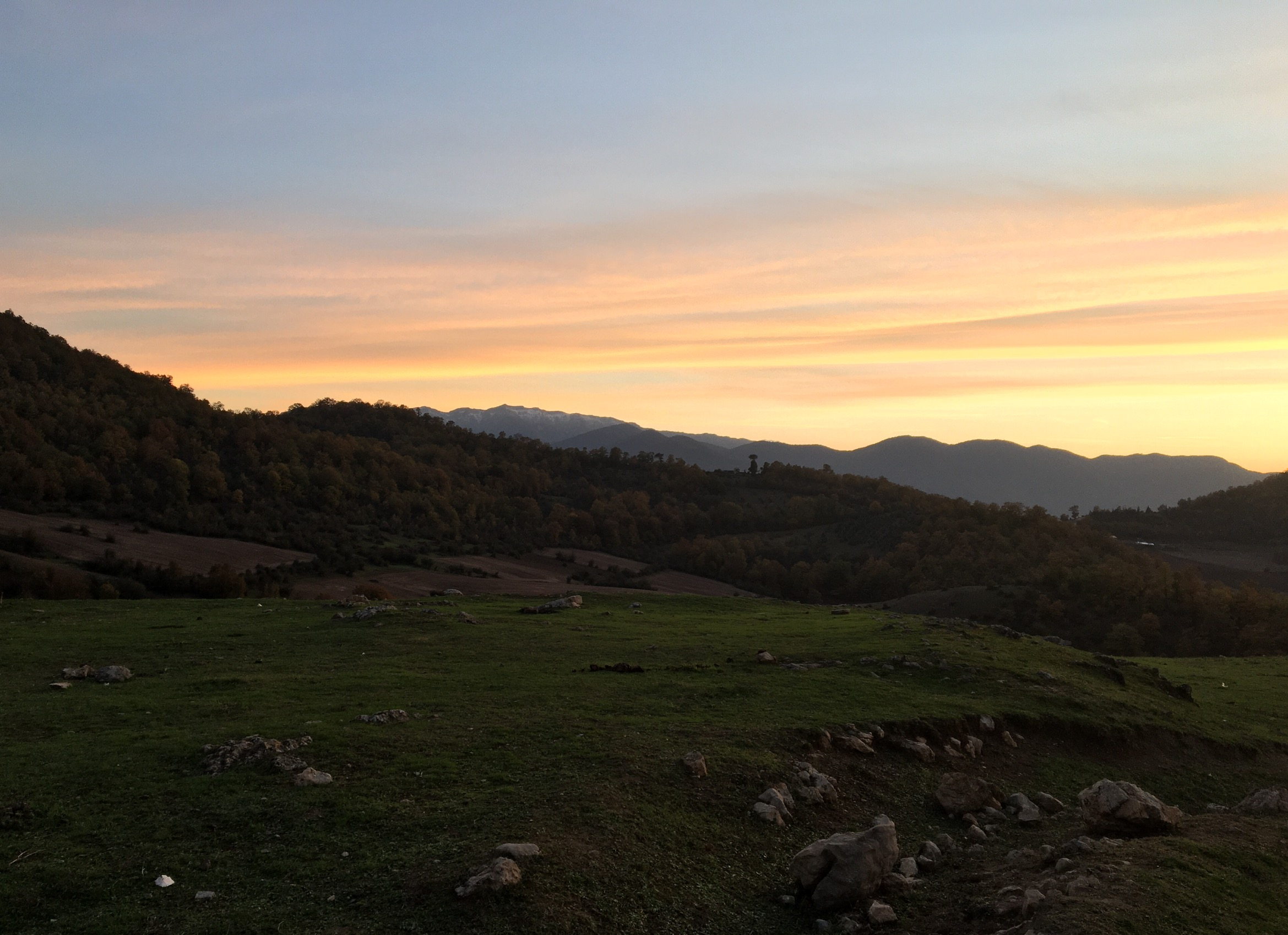

- Location within Iran
- Coordinates: 36°12′44″N 53°31′28″E
- Country: Iran
- Province: Mazandaran
- County: Sari
- Bakhsh: Chahardangeh
- Rural District: Chahardangeh

Population (2016)
  - Total: 126
- Time zone: UTC+3:30 (IRST)
- Website: www.instagram.com/kholerd_ir/

Kholerd (Persian: خلرد) is a village in Chahardangeh Rural District, Chahardangeh District, Sari County, Mazandaran Province, Iran. At the 2016 census, its population was 126, in 42 families. Up from 106 in 2006.
