= Sava Sareh =

Sava Sareh سواسره
- Village
- Location within Iran
- Coordinates: 36°09′03″N 53°32′29″E
- Country: Iran
- Province: Mazandaran
- County: Sari
- Bakhsh: Chahardangeh
- Rural District: Chahardangeh

Population (2016)
  - Total: 147
- Time zone: UTC+3:30 (IRST)

Sava Sareh (Persian: سواسره, also Romanized as Savā Sareh) is a village in Chahardangeh Rural District, Chahardangeh District, Sari County, Mazandaran Province, Iran. At the 2006 census, its population was 157, in 40 families. In 2016, its population was 147 in 44 households.
