= Manzil (disambiguation) =

Manzil is one of the seven parts of the Qur'an.

Manzil may also refer to:

- Manzil (1936 film), a 1936 Indian film
- Manzil (1960 film), a 1960 Indian Hindi-language film directed by Mandi Burman
- Manzil (1979 film), a 1979 Indian Hindi-language film directed by Basu Chatterjee
- Manzil (Maldivian TV series), 1994 Maldivian drama television series
- Manzil (Pakistani TV series), a 2006 Pakistani drama television series
- Manzil Saini, an Indian police officer

== See also ==
- Manzel (disambiguation)
- Manzila Uddin, Baroness Uddin, a British politician
- Manzilein Aur Bhi Hain, a 1974 Indian Hindi-language crime thriller film by Mahesh Bhatt, his directorial debut
- Manzilein Apani Apani, an Indian television series
- Manzil Manzil, a 1984 Indian film directed by Nasir Hussain
- Manzil Pyaar Ki, Hindi title of the 1996 Indian Tamil-language romantic comedy film Poove Unakkaga
- Manzil Abu Ruqaybah, a town in extreme north Tunisia
- Lunar mansion (Arabic: plural manāzil al-qamar), stations of the moon in astronomy
