= Aqeh Kheyl =

Aqeh Kheyl عقه خيل سعیدآباد، نقیب خیل
- Village
- Location within Iran
- Coordinates: 36°10′28″N 53°28′41″E
- Country: Iran
- Province: Mazandaran
- County: Sari
- Bakhsh: Chahardangeh
- Rural District: Chahardangeh

Population (2016)
  - Total: 37
- Time zone: UTC+3:30 (IRST)

Aqeh Kheyl (Persian: عقه خيل, also Romanized as ‘Aqeh Kheyl; also known as Naqīb Kheyl, Naqīb Kheyl Sa‘īdābād, Naqīb Khīl Sa‘īdābād, and Sa’īd Ābād) is a village in Chahardangeh Rural District, Chahardangeh District, Sari County, Mazandaran Province, Iran. At the 2016 census, its population was 37, in 17 families. Decreased from 65 people in 2006.
