= Kiasar =

City in Mazandaran province, Iran

Kiasar Persian: كياسر
- City
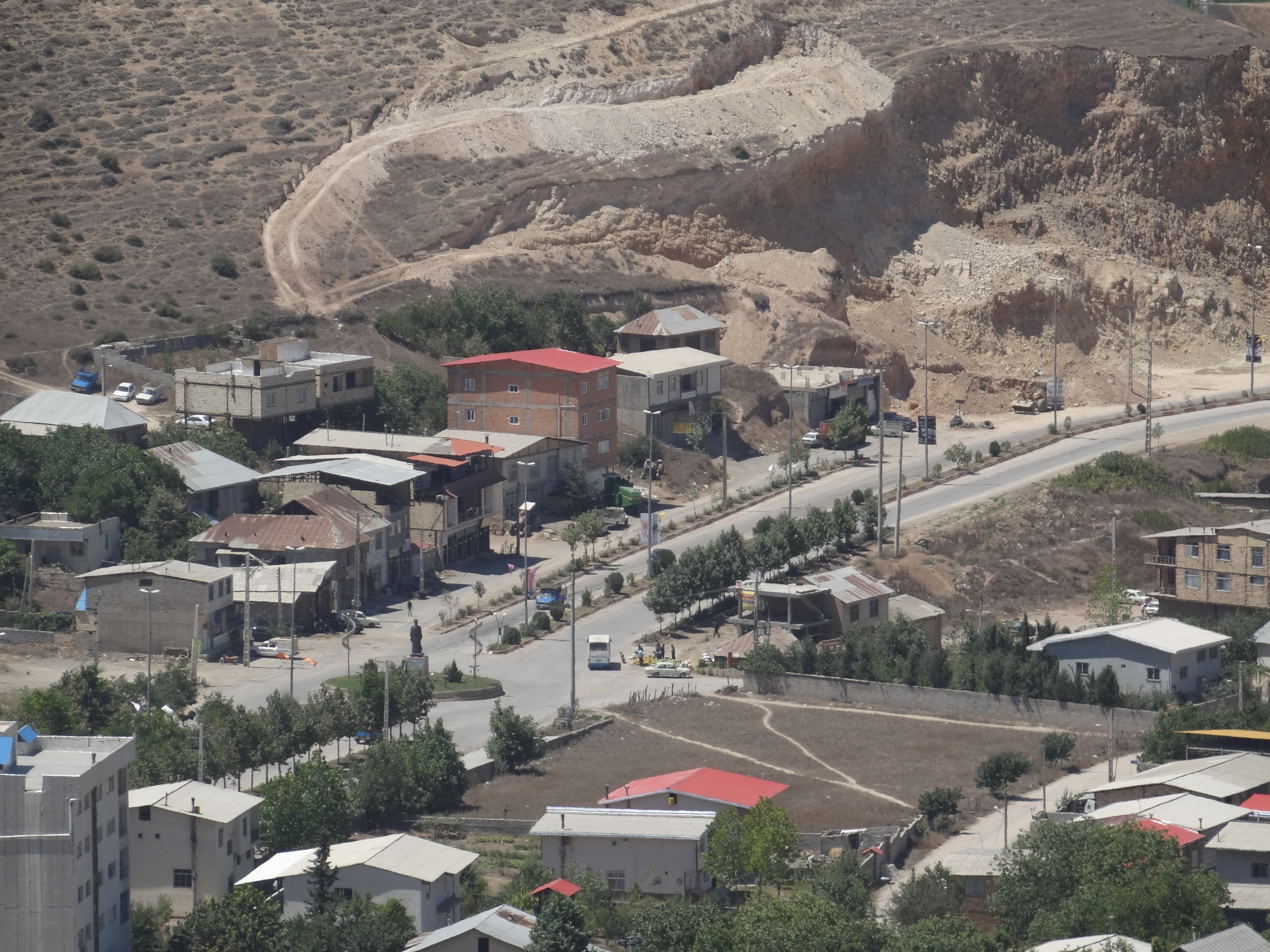
- The city of Kiasar

- Location within Iran
- Coordinates: 36°14′15″N 53°32′31″E
- Country: Iran
- Province: Mazandaran
- County: Sari
- District: Chahardangeh

Population (2016)
  - Total: 3,384
- Time zone: UTC+3:30 (IRST)
- Website: www.kiasar.ir

Kiasar (Persian: كياسر) (Note: Also romanized as Keyāsar, Kīāsar, and Kīya Sar) is a city in, and the capital of, Chahardangeh District in Sari County, Mazandaran province, Iran. It also serves as the administrative center for Chahardangeh Rural District.

== Demographics ==
=== Population ===
At the time of the 2006 National Census, the city's population was 3,590 in 913 households. The following census in 2011 counted 2,837 people in 800 households. The 2016 census measured the population of the city as 3,384 people in 1,084 households.

== Climate ==
Kiasar has a hot-summer Mediterranean climate (Csa) according to the Köppen climate classification.

Climate data for Kiasar(2002-2010) Elevation: 1294.3m
Month	Jan	Feb	Mar	Apr	May	Jun	Jul	Aug	Sep	Oct	Nov	Dec	Year
Daily mean °C (°F)	3.1 (37.6)	5.2 (41.4)	8.9 (48.0)	11.6 (52.9)	15.6 (60.1)	19.4 (66.9)	21.2 (70.2)	22.0 (71.6)	19.5 (67.1)	16.3 (61.3)	9.7 (49.5)	4.7 (40.5)	13.1 (55.6)
Average precipitation mm (inches)	51.3 (2.02)	53.5 (2.11)	41.9 (1.65)	50.1 (1.97)	28.6 (1.13)	16.2 (0.64)	13.8 (0.54)	24.4 (0.96)	21.0 (0.83)	35.6 (1.40)	76.7 (3.02)	67.2 (2.65)	480.3 (18.92)
Source: IRIMO
