= Manzel =

Manzel may refer to:

== Places ==
- Pain Zoghal Manzel, a village in Chapakrud Rural District
- Halaleh-ye Manzel, village in Shahid Modarres Rural District
- Manzel Darreh, a village in Chahardangeh Rural District

== Arts and entertainment ==
- Al-Manzel Raqam 13 (Arabic: المنزل رقم 13, House No. 13), a 1952 Egyptian mystery/crime film
- Manzel (band)

== People ==
- Dagmar Manzel (born 1958), German actress
- Ludwig Manzel (1858–1936), German sculptor, painter and graphic artist
