= Didu, Iran =

Didu ديدو
- Village
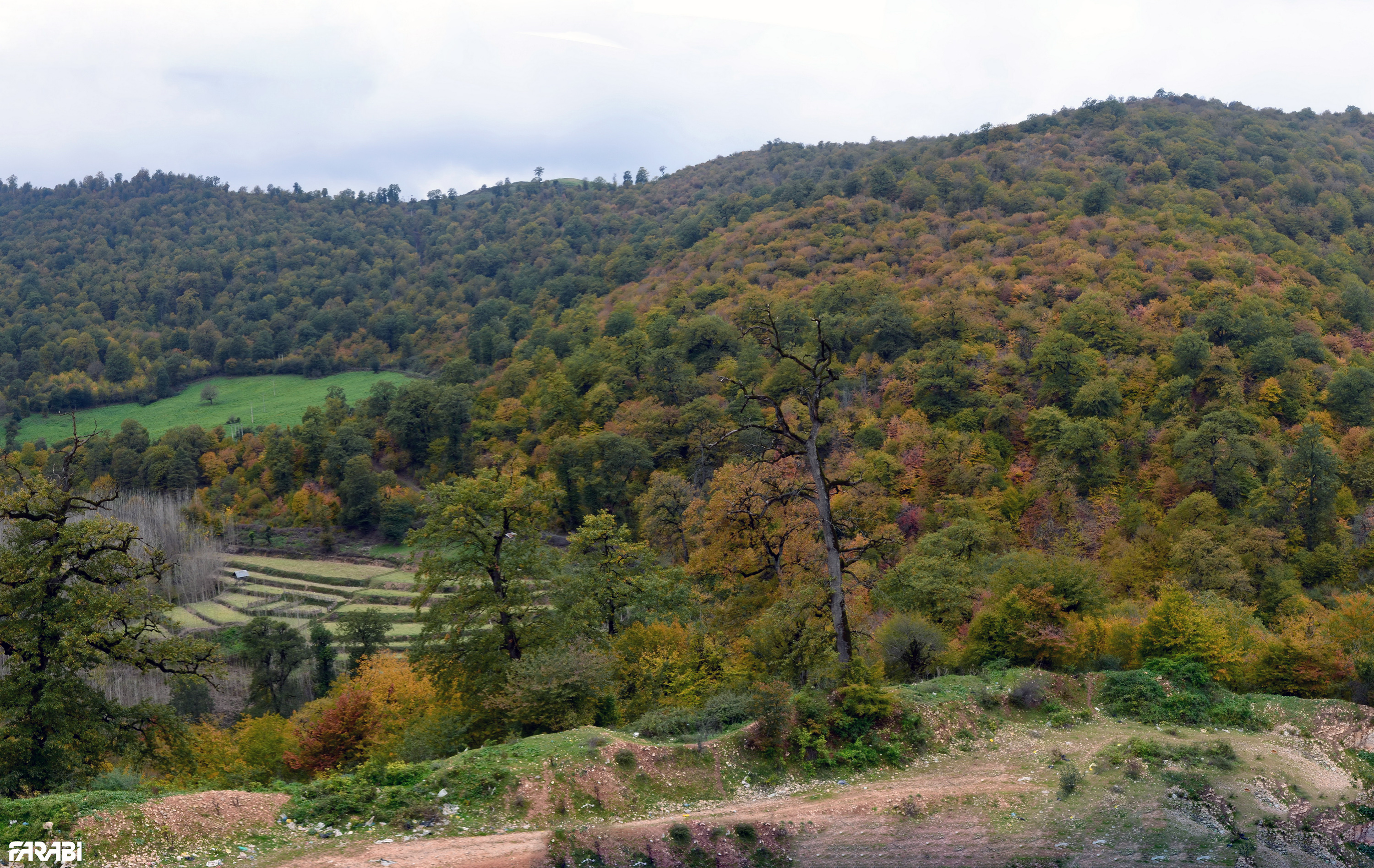
- Nature of Didu

- Location within Iran
- Coordinates: 36°16′42″N 53°24′07″E
- Country: Iran
- Province: Mazandaran
- County: Sari
- Bakhsh: Chahardangeh
- Rural District: Chahardangeh

Population (2016)
  - Total: 53
- Time zone: UTC+3:30 (IRST)

Didu (Persian: ديدو, also Romanized as Dīdū; also known as Dehdū) is a village in Chahardangeh Rural District, Chahardangeh District, Sari County, Mazandaran Province, Iran. At the 2016 census, its population was 53, in 16 families. Decreased from 90 people in 2006.
