= Atini =

Atini آتينی آتنی (Mazandarani)
- Village
- Location within Iran
- Coordinates: 36°07′40″N 53°33′35″E
- Country: Iran
- Province: Mazandaran
- County: Sari
- Bakhsh: Chahardangeh
- Rural District: Chahardangeh

Population (2016)
  - Total: 81
- Time zone: UTC+3:30 (IRST)

Atini (Persian: آتینی, also Romanized as Ātīnī, Mazandarani: Ātnī) is a village in Chahardangeh Rural District, Chahardangeh District, Sari County, Mazandaran Province, Iran. At the 2006 census, its population was 110, in 32 families. It fell to 81 people and 22 households in 2016.
