= Chahardangeh Rural District (Sari County) =

Rural district in Mazandaran province, Iran

Chahardangeh Rural District Persian: دهستان چهاردانگه
- Rural District
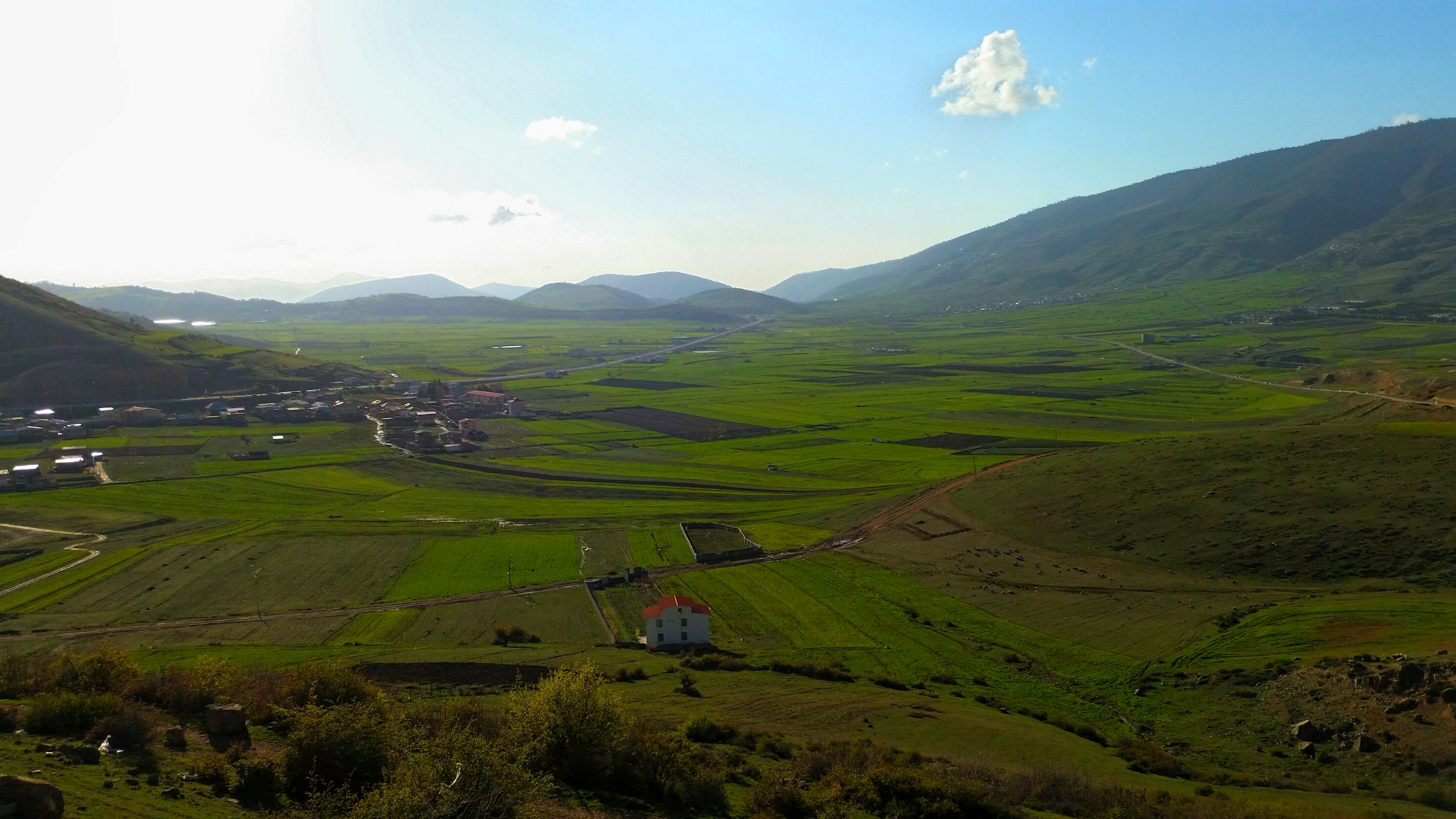
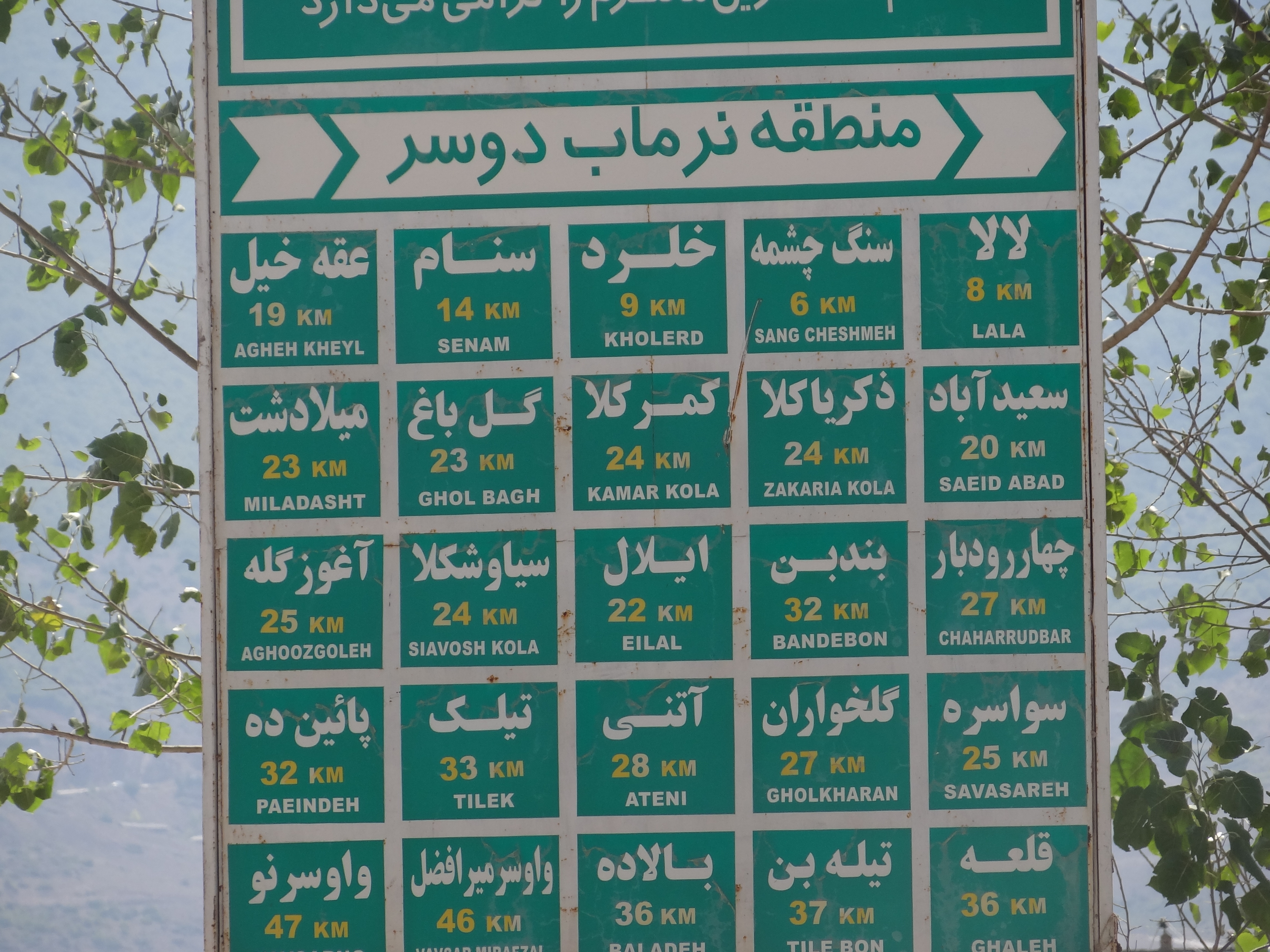

- Location within Iran
- Coordinates: 36°12′N 53°33′E
- Country: Iran
- Province: Mazandaran
- County: Sari
- District: Chahardangeh
- Established: 1987
- Capital: Kiasar

Population (2016)
  - Total: 4,864
- Time zone: UTC+3:30 (IRST)

Chahardangeh Rural District (Persian: دهستان چهاردانگه) is in Chahardangeh District of Sari County, Mazandaran province, Iran. It is administered from the city of Kiasar.

== Demographics ==
=== Population ===
At the time of the 2006 National Census, the rural district's population was 5,884 in 1,711 households. There were 4,081 inhabitants in 1,382 households at the following census of 2011. The 2016 census measured the population of the rural district as 4,864 in 1,810 households. The most populous of its 53 villages was Chalu, with 340 people.

=== Other villages in the rural district ===
- Aghuz Galleh
- Alendan
- Aqeh Kheyl
- Atini
- Azni
- Bala Deh
- Band-e Bon
- Chahar Rudbar
- Didu
- Eskard
- Gandab
- Gel Jari
- Gol Bagh
- Gol Khvaran
- Ilal
- Jamal ol Din Kola
- Kamar Kola
- Kholard
- Ki Kola
- Kiadeh
- Konim
- Konta
- Lala
- Langar
- Manzel Darreh
- Mazarostaq
- Miladasht
- Mir Afzal-e Vavsar
- Qaleh
- Rosbaram
- Rudbar-e Edru
- Saidabad
- Sang Cheshmeh
- Sanur
- Sava Sareh
- Senam
- Siavash Kola
- Talu Kola
- Tarkam
- Tileh Bon
- Tilek
- Vari
- Zakaria Kola

== Gallery ==
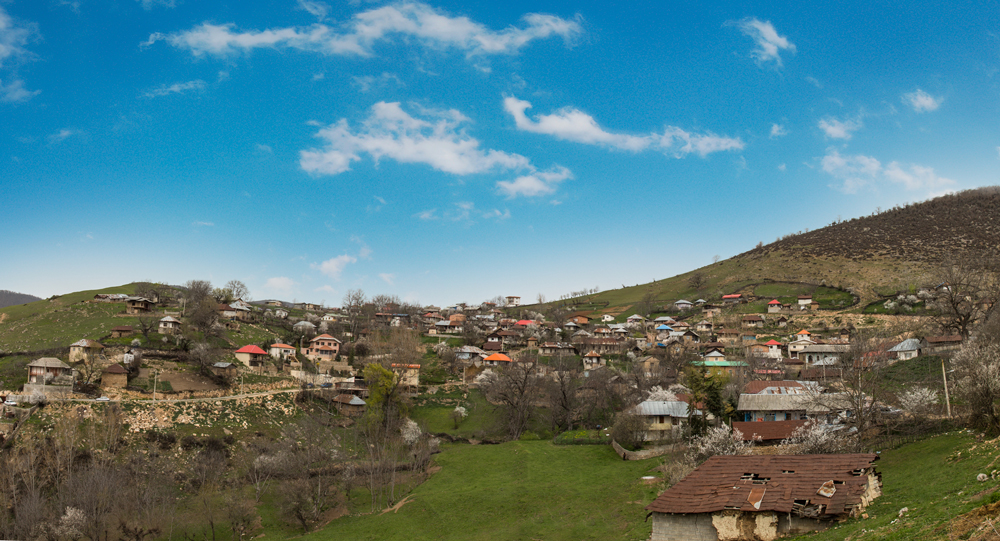
Ilal Village

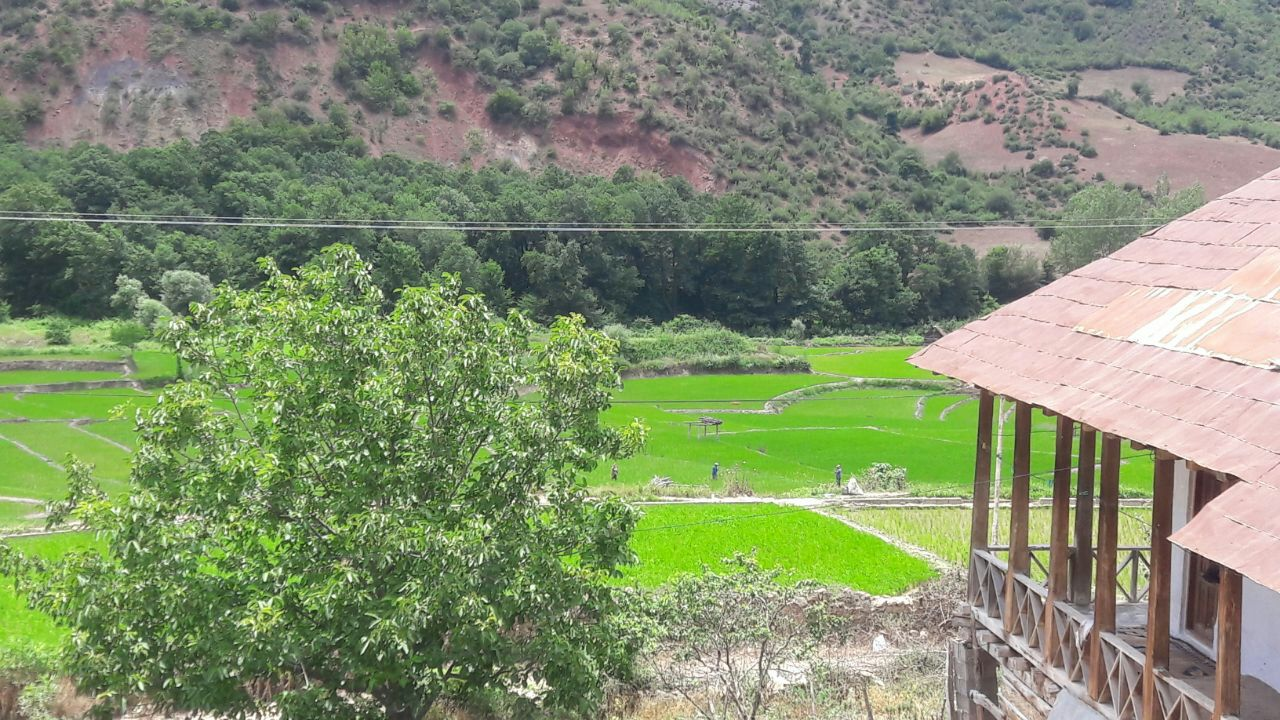
Miladasht rice fields

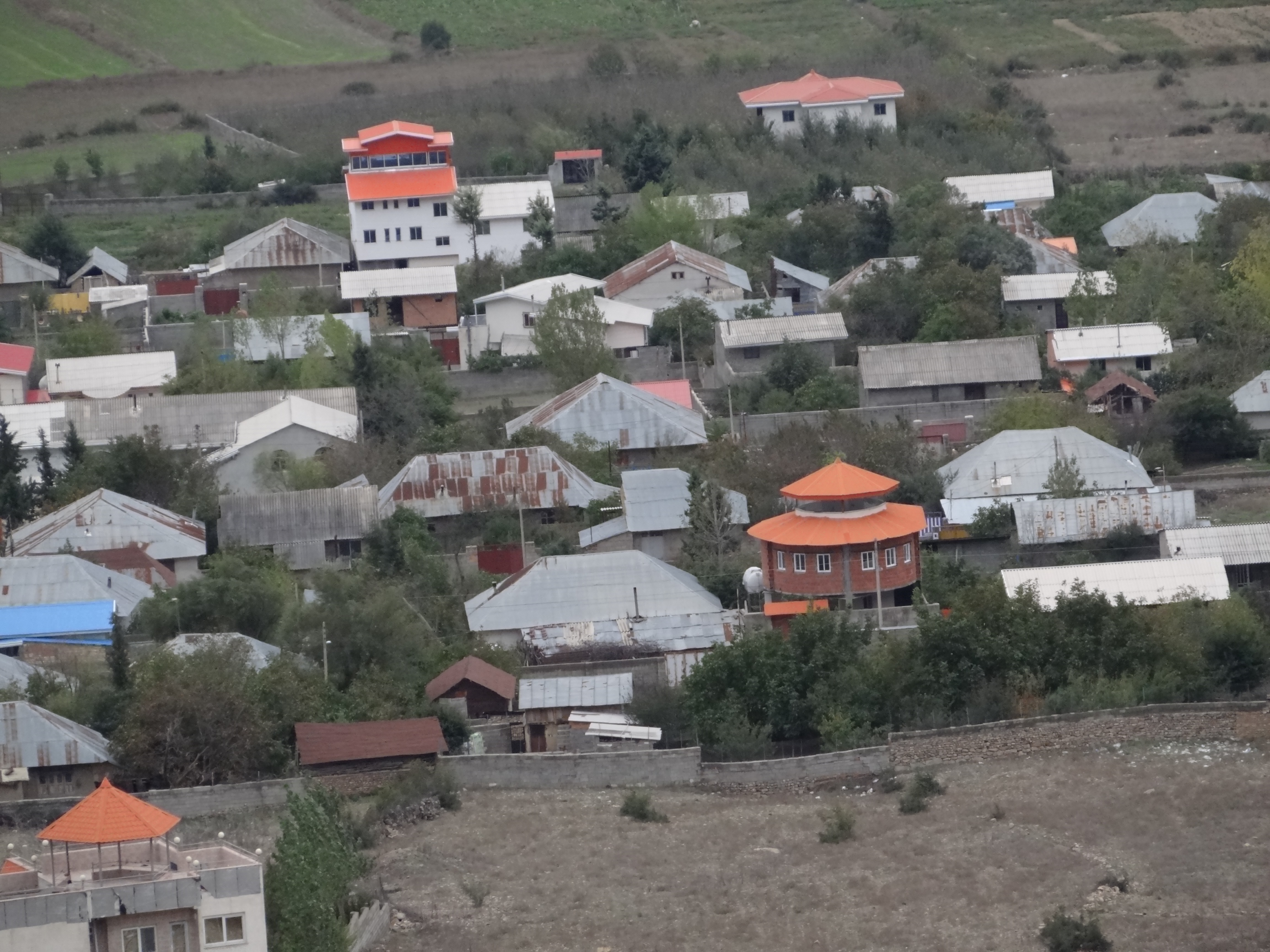
Vari Village

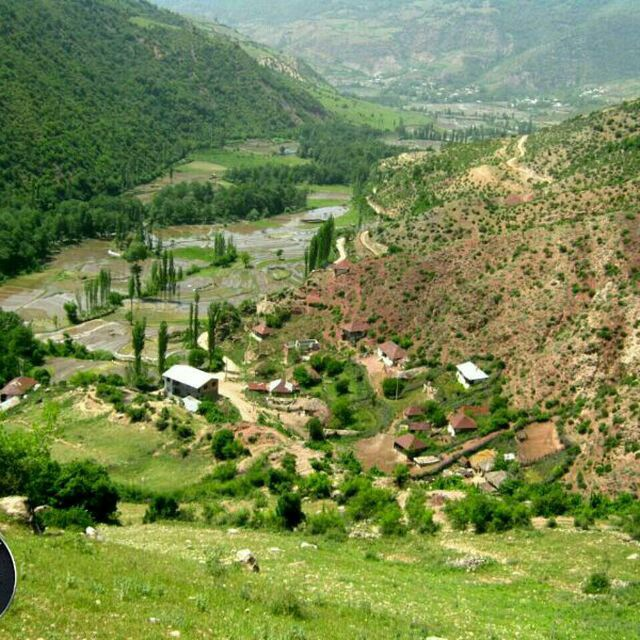
Gol Bagh
