= Azni =

Azni ازنی
- Village
- Location within Iran
- Coordinates: 36°14′13″N 53°25′07″E
- Country: Iran
- Province: Mazandaran
- County: Sari
- Bakhsh: Chahardangeh
- Rural District: Chahardangeh

Population (2016)
  - Total: 173
- Time zone: UTC+3:30 (IRST)

Azni (Persian: ازنی, also Romanized as Aznī and Azenī; also known as Owlīkā) is a village in Chahardangeh Rural District, Chahardangeh District, Sari County, Mazandaran Province, Iran. At the 2006 census, its population was 246, in 70 families. Down to 173 people and 68 households in 2016.
