= Dokhaharan lake =

Lake in Iran

- دریاچه دوخواهران (Persian)
- Location within Iran
- Interactive map of Dokhaharan lake
- Location: Larijan District, Amol County, Mazandaran Province, Iran
- Coordinates: 35°50′58″N 52°20′56″E
- Primary inflows: Melted snows
- Primary outflows: none
- Surface elevation: 3,880 metres (12,730 ft)
- Settlements: Amol

Dokhaharan lake also known as Dokhaharoon lake (which means two sisters lake) is a lake located on western hillside of Mount Damavand. It is named after nearby mounts called Dokhaharan.

It is located in Larijan District, Amol County, Mazandaran Province. Road 77 (Iran) passes by this lake. The lake is located 3880 meters higher than sea level, and its primary inflow is melted snows on the nearby mounts. This lake is not very deep.

== See also ==
- Alendan lake
