= Konta, Iran =

Konta كنتا
- Village
- Location within Iran
- Coordinates: 36°15′56″N 53°23′34″E
- Country: Iran
- Province: Mazandaran
- County: Sari
- Bakhsh: Chahardangeh
- Rural District: Chahardangeh

Population (2016)
  - Total: 41
- Time zone: UTC+3:30 (IRST)

Konta (Persian: كنتا, also Romanized as Kontā) is a village in Chahardangeh Rural District, Chahardangeh District, Sari County, Mazandaran Province, Iran. At the 2006 census, its population was 64, in 20 families. In 2016, its population was 41, in 21 households.
