= Bala Deh, Mazandaran =

Bala Deh بالاده
- Village
- Location within Iran
- Coordinates: 36°08′28″N 53°37′20″E
- Country: Iran
- Province: Mazandaran
- County: Sari
- Bakhsh: Chahardangeh
- Rural District: Chahardangeh

Population (2016)
  - Total: 120
- Time zone: UTC+3:30 (IRST)

Bala Deh (Persian: بالاده, also Romanized as Bālā Deh) is a village in Chahardangeh Rural District, Chahardangeh District, Sari County, Mazandaran Province, Iran. At the 2016 census, its population was 120 people in 51 families, an increase from 61 people in 2006. It is located about 95 km (59 mi) southeast of the provincial capital, Sari, in the foothills of the Alborz Mountains.
