= Sanur, Iran =

Sanur سنور
- Village
- Location within Iran
- Coordinates: 36°16′10″N 53°39′44″E
- Country: Iran
- Province: Mazandaran
- County: Sari
- Bakhsh: Chahardangeh
- Rural District: Chahardangeh

Population (2016)
  - Total: 161
- Time zone: UTC+3:30 (IRST)

Sanur (Persian: سنور, also Romanized as Sanūr) is a village in Chahardangeh Rural District, Chahardangeh District, Sari County, Mazandaran Province, Iran. At the 2006 census, its population was 202, in 47 families. In 2016, it was 161 people in 60 households.
