= Manzel Darreh =

Manzel Darreh منزل دره
- Village
- Location within Iran
- Coordinates: 36°18′07″N 53°38′06″E
- Country: Iran
- Province: Mazandaran
- County: Sari
- Bakhsh: Chahardangeh
- Rural District: Chahardangeh

Population (2016)
  - Total: 105
- Time zone: UTC+3:30 (IRST)

Manzel Darreh (Persian: منزل دره) is a village in Chahardangeh Rural District, Chahardangeh District, Sari County, Mazandaran Province, Iran. At the 2006 census, its population was 105, in 33 families. Up from 103 in 2006.
