= Mazarostaq =

Mazarostaq مازارستاق
- Village
- Location within Iran
- Coordinates: 36°15′23″N 53°25′32″E
- Country: Iran
- Province: Mazandaran
- County: Sari
- Bakhsh: Chahardangeh
- Rural District: Chahardangeh

Population (2016)
  - Total: 54
- Time zone: UTC+3:30 (IRST)

Mazarostaq (Persian: مازارستاق, also Romanized as Māzārostāq) is a village in Chahardangeh Rural District, Chahardangeh District, Sari County, Mazandaran Province, Iran. At the 2006 census, its population was 67, in 22 families. Down to 54 people and 20 households in 2016.
