= Chahardangeh District (Sari County) =

District in Mazandaran province, Iran

Chahardangeh District Persian: بخش چهاردانگه
- District
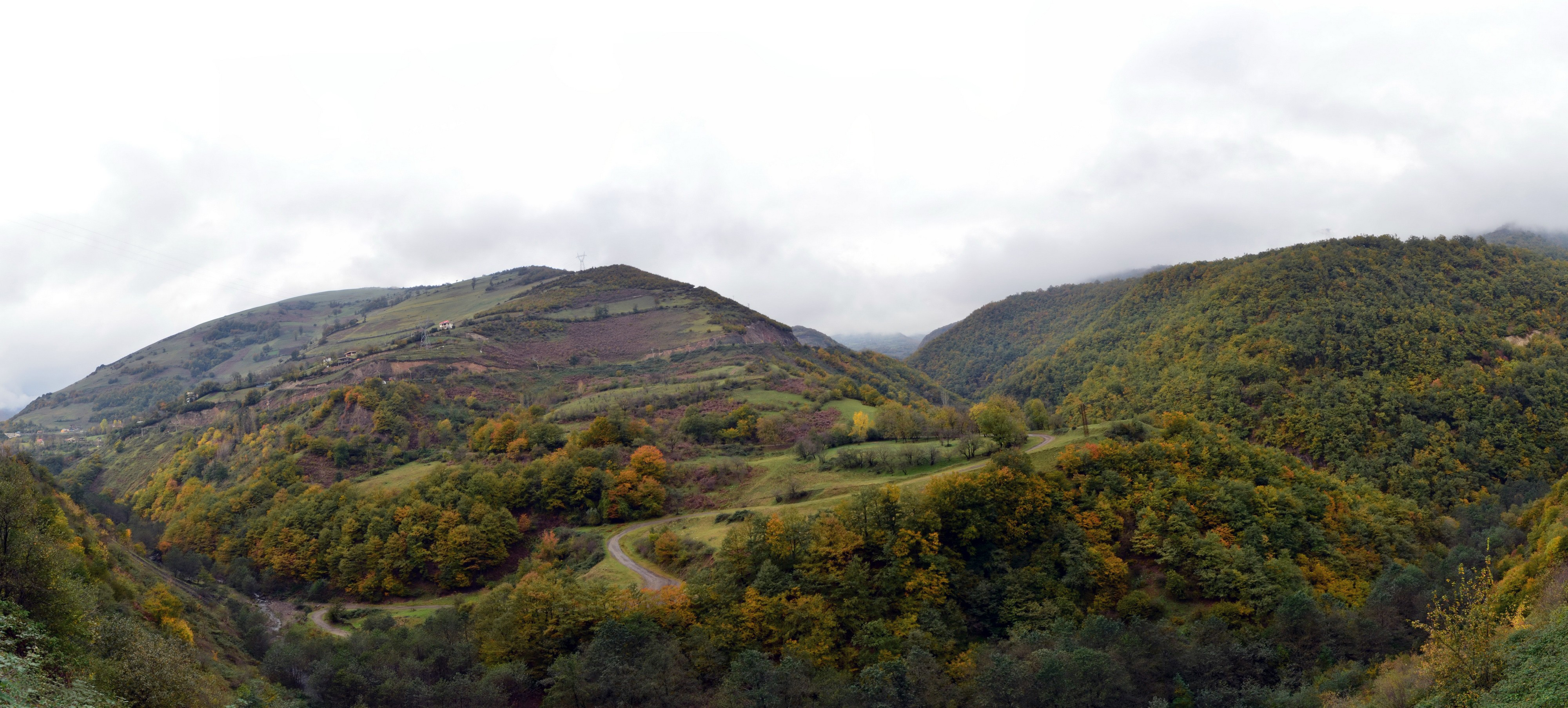
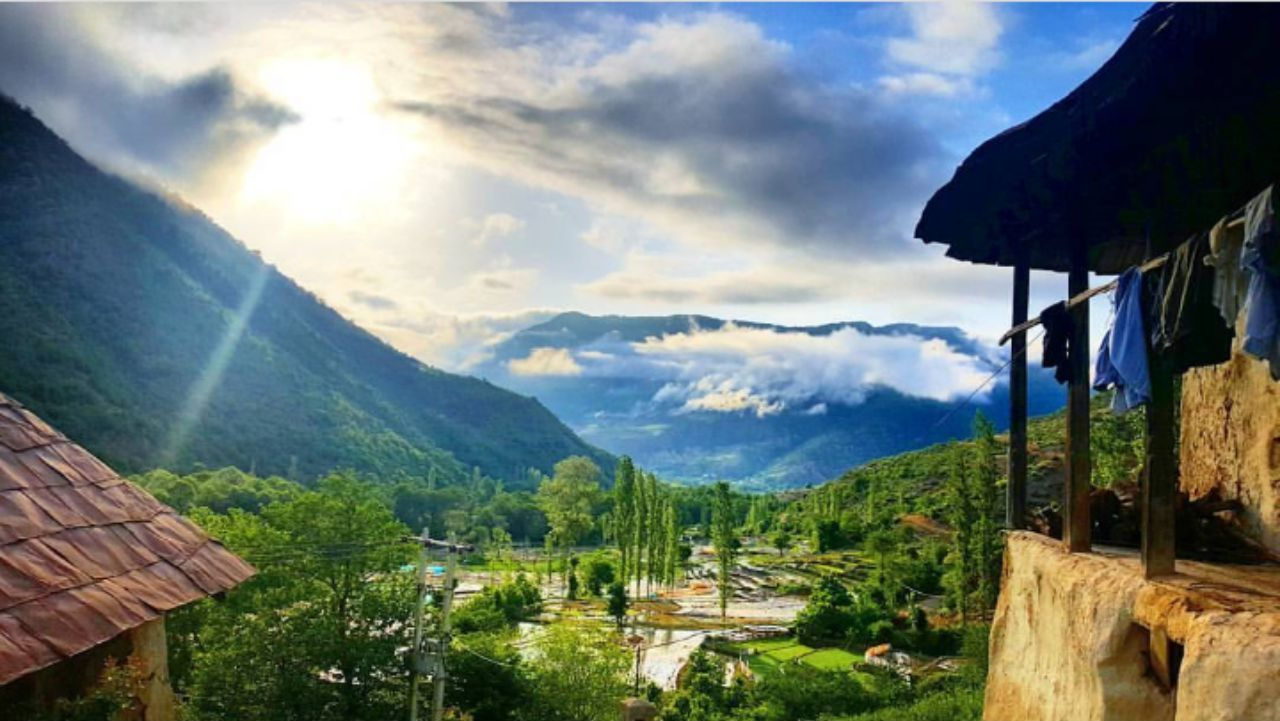
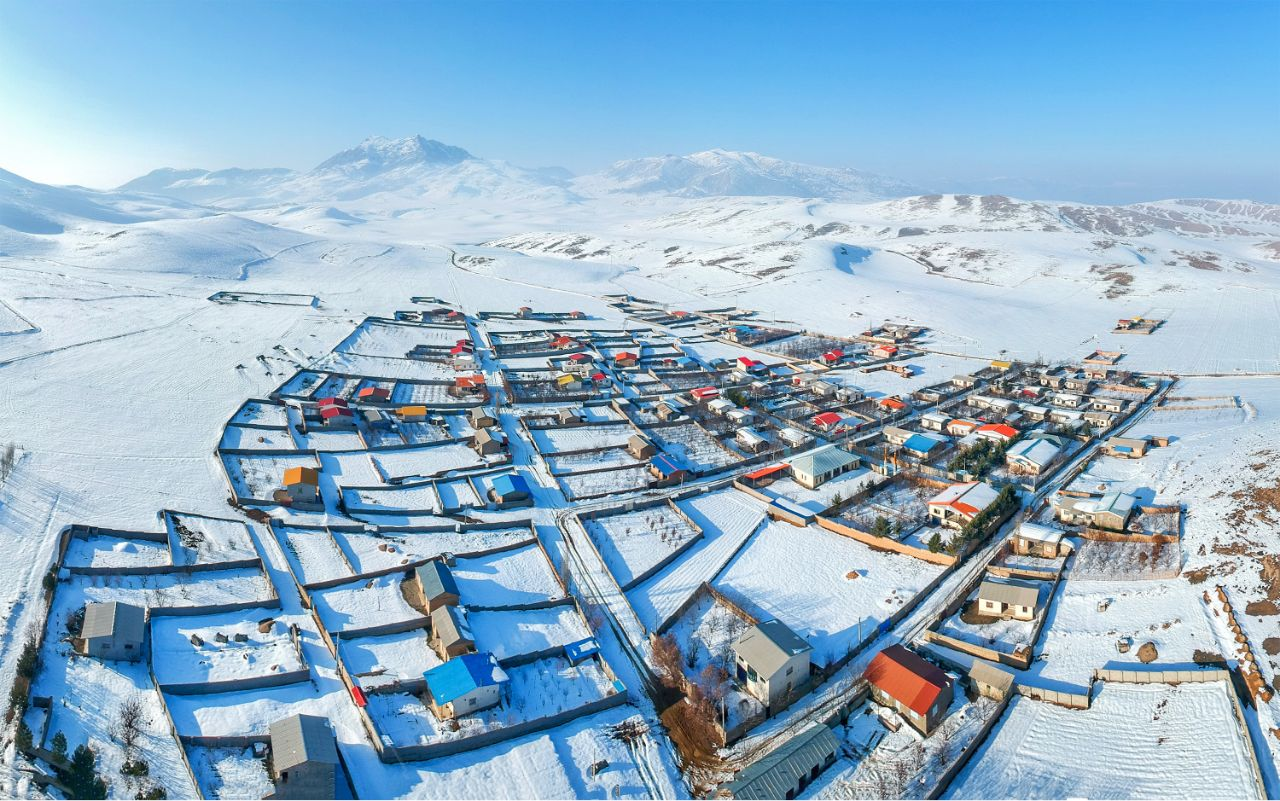

- Location within Iran
- Coordinates: 36°14′N 53°37′E
- Country: Iran
- Province: Mazandaran
- County: Sari
- Capital: Kiasar

Population (2016)
  - Total: 17,376
- Time zone: UTC+3:30 (IRST)

Chahardangeh District (Persian: بخش چهاردانگه) is in Sari County, Mazandaran province, Iran. Its capital is the city of Kiasar.

== Demographics ==
=== Population ===
At the time of the 2006 National Census, the district's population was 19,969 in 5,149 households. The following census in 2011 counted 15,796 people in 4,871 households. The 2016 census measured the population of the district as 17,376 inhabitants in 6,035 households.

=== Administrative divisions ===
Chahardangeh District Population
Administrative Divisions	2006	2011	2016
Chahardangeh RD	5,884	4,081	4,864
Garmab RD	6,610	5,533	5,804
Poshtkuh RD	3,885	3,345	3,324
Kiasar (city)	3,590	2,837	3,384
Total	19,969	15,796	17,376
RD = Rural District
