= Ghazaleh Alizadeh =

Iranian poet and writer

- غزاله علیزاده
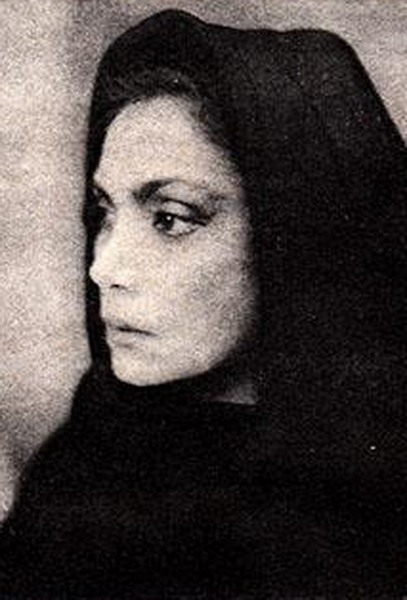
- Born: Fatemeh Alizadeh فاطمه علیزاده; 15 February 1949; Mashhad, Iran
- Died: 12 May 1996 (aged 47); Javaher Deh, Iran
- Spouses: Bijan Elahi (m. 1969, divorced): Mohammad Reza Nezam-Shahidi
- Children: 1

Ghazaleh Alizadeh (Persian: غزاله علیزاده; 15 February 1949 – 12 May 1996) (née Fatemeh Alizadeh) was an Iranian poet and writer. Her mother, Monirosadat Seyedi, shared her literary talents as both a poet and writer. Alizadeh was married twice, and with her husband Bijan Elahi, she had a daughter named Salma. Additionally, she adopted two girls who had survived the 1961 Qazvin earthquake.

== Biography ==
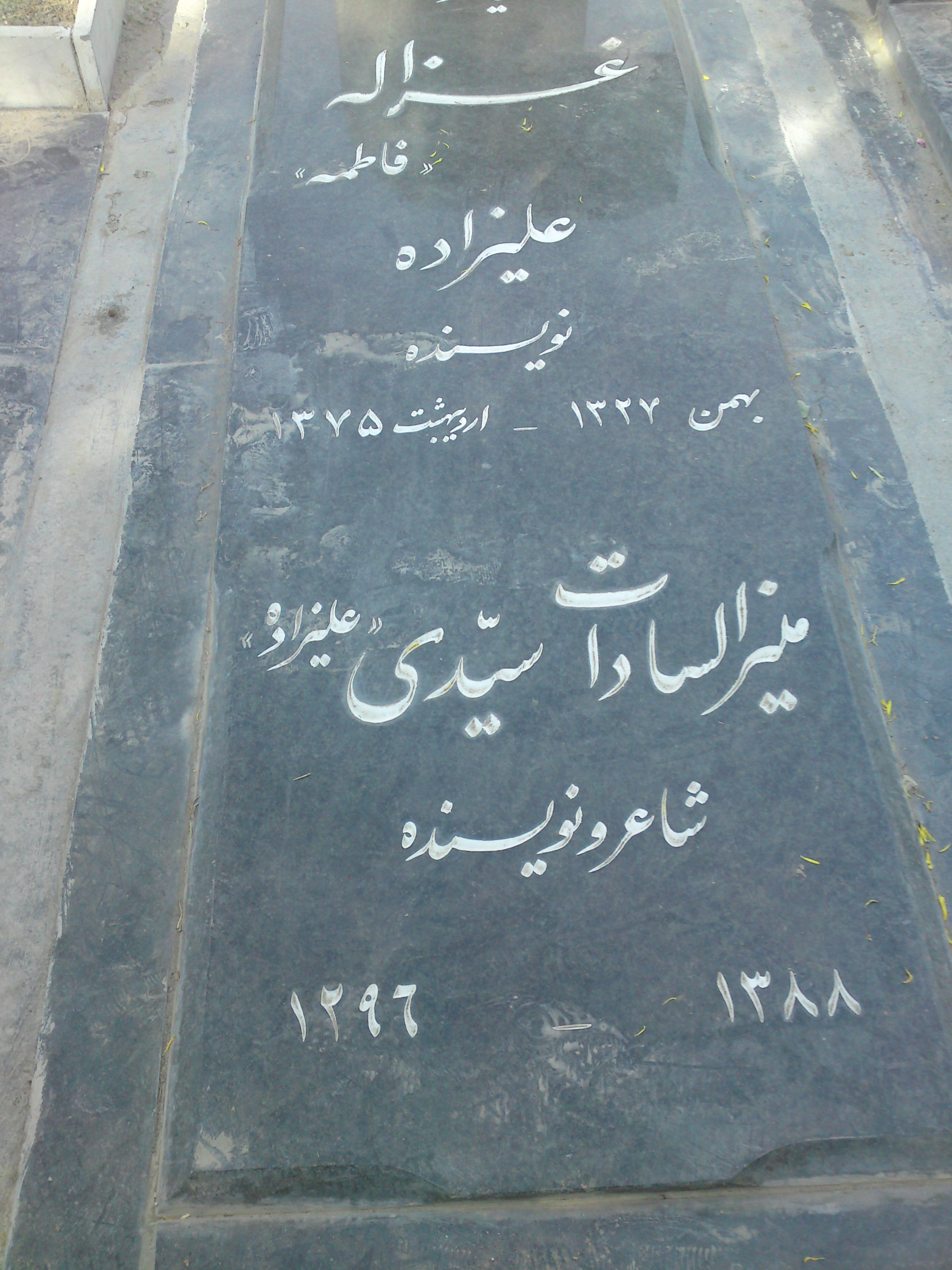
Tomb of Ghazaleh Alizadeh and her mother Monirosadat Seyedi.

She was an introvert, smart, and energetic student during her school years. She earned her diploma in Humanities from Mahasti High School and became a vegetarian around the same time. Alizadeh obtained her BA in Political Sciences from Tehran University before moving to France to study philosophy and cinema at Sorbonne University.

Although she initially went to Paris to pursue a PhD in law, she switched her focus to illuminationism and planned to write her dissertation on Rumi. However, she abandoned her studies following the sudden death of her father.

She began her literary career in Mashhad, writing short stories. Her major work was the novel Khaneye Edrisiha (The Edrissis' House) (Persian: خانه ادریسیها). Her short stories include The Crossroad, After Summer, and The In-transitory Journey. Additionally, she wrote the novels Two Landscapes and Tehran Nights. Some of her works have been translated into English by Rosa Jamali.

While battling cancer, she attempted suicide twice. In May 1996, she ultimately took her own life by hanging herself from a tree in Javaher Deh, Ramsar, Mazandaran. Her body was buried at Emamzadeh Taher cemetery.

A documentary titled Ghazaleh Alizadeh Trial has been produced about her life.

== Books ==
=== Novels ===
- Two views
- Edrissis' House (two volumes)
- Tehran's nights

=== Stories ===
- "After summer"
- "Impassable travel"

=== Other ===
- Halls
- House's dream and downfall nightmare
