= Ramsar =

Ramsar may refer to:

- Places so named:
  - Ramsar, Mazandaran, city in Iran
  - Ramsar, Rajasthan, village in India
- Eponyms of the Iranian city:
  - Ramsar Convention, concerning wetlands, signed in Ramsar, Iran
  - Ramsar site, wetland listed in accord with the Ramsar Convention
- Others
  - Ramsar Palace, a palace in Ramsar, Mazandaran

== See also ==
- Category:Ramsar sites
