= Rosa Jamali =

Iranian writer (born 1977)

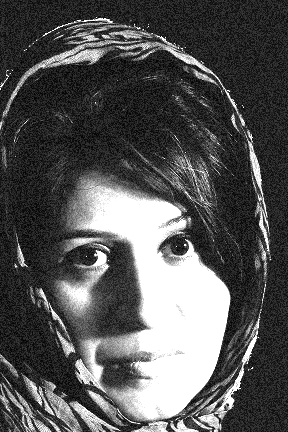
- Born: November 19, 1977; Tabriz, Iran
- Education: Tehran University of Art, University of Tehran
- Occupation: Poet

Rosa Jamali (Persian: رزا جمالی; born 1977 in Tabriz) is an Iranian poet, translator, literary critic, and playwright.

== Education and career ==
She studied Dramatic Literature at the Tehran University of Art and later received an MA degree in English literature from Tehran University.

Her debut collection of poems, This Dead Body is Not an Apple, It Is Either a Cucumber or a Pear, was published in 1997 and announced a major new voice in Iranian poetry. The book opened Persian poetry to new creative possibilities.

Making Coffee To Run a Crime Story focuses on misogyny and crime against women.

She has been praised in her recent collections for combining present-day settings with Persian mysticism.

Scholars say that she has perceived a new female style and rhetoric and influenced a generation of female Persian poetry. She is also a prolific translator and has translated English poetry into Persian.

== Works ==
=== Poetry ===
- This Dead Body Is Not An Apple, It's Either A Cucumber Or A Pear (1997)
- Making A Face (1998)
- Making Coffee To Run A Crime Story (2002)
- The Hourglass is Fast Asleep (2011)
- Highways Blocked (2014)
- Here Gravity is Less (2019)

=== Plays ===
- The Shadow (2007)

=== Translations ===
- Sailing to Byzantium, Selected poems of William Butler Yeats
- Tomorrow and Tomorrow and Tomorrow (a selection), William Shakespeare
- Edge, An anthology of English Poetry in Persian (Ted Hughes, Ezra Pound, Sylvia Plath, H.D., Emily Dickinson, Adrienne Rich, Stevie Smith, Allen Ginsberg, T.S. Eliot, Joseph Brodsky, Rupert Brooke, Edith Sitwell, Robert Frost, Louise Gluck, Emma Lazarus, Henry Wadsworth Longfellow, Sudeep Sen, Roger McGough, Walt Whitman and many others...)
- Tulips, Ten Female Poets in English (Natasha Trethewey, Solmaz Sharif, Louise Gluck, Emma Lazarus, Sylvia Plath, H.D., Emily Dickinson, Adrienne Rich, Stevie Smith, Edith Sitwell)
- The Wild Iris, Selected Poems of Louise Gluck
- A Certain Lady, Selected Short stories and Poems, Dorothy Parker
- Words, Selected Poems, Sylvia Plath
- The Waste Land, Selected Poems, T.S. Eliot
- The Fir Tree, Hans Christian Andersen
- Sand and Time, Selected Poems of Amir Or
- The House of The Edrisis, a novel by Ghazaleh Alizadeh

=== Essays ===
- Revelations in the Wind; theory and analysis (Essays on the Poetics of Persian Poetry)

== Footnotes ==
The Dark Room, Essays on Rosa Jamali's Poetry, edited by Reza Shalbafan
