= Ramsar International Airport =

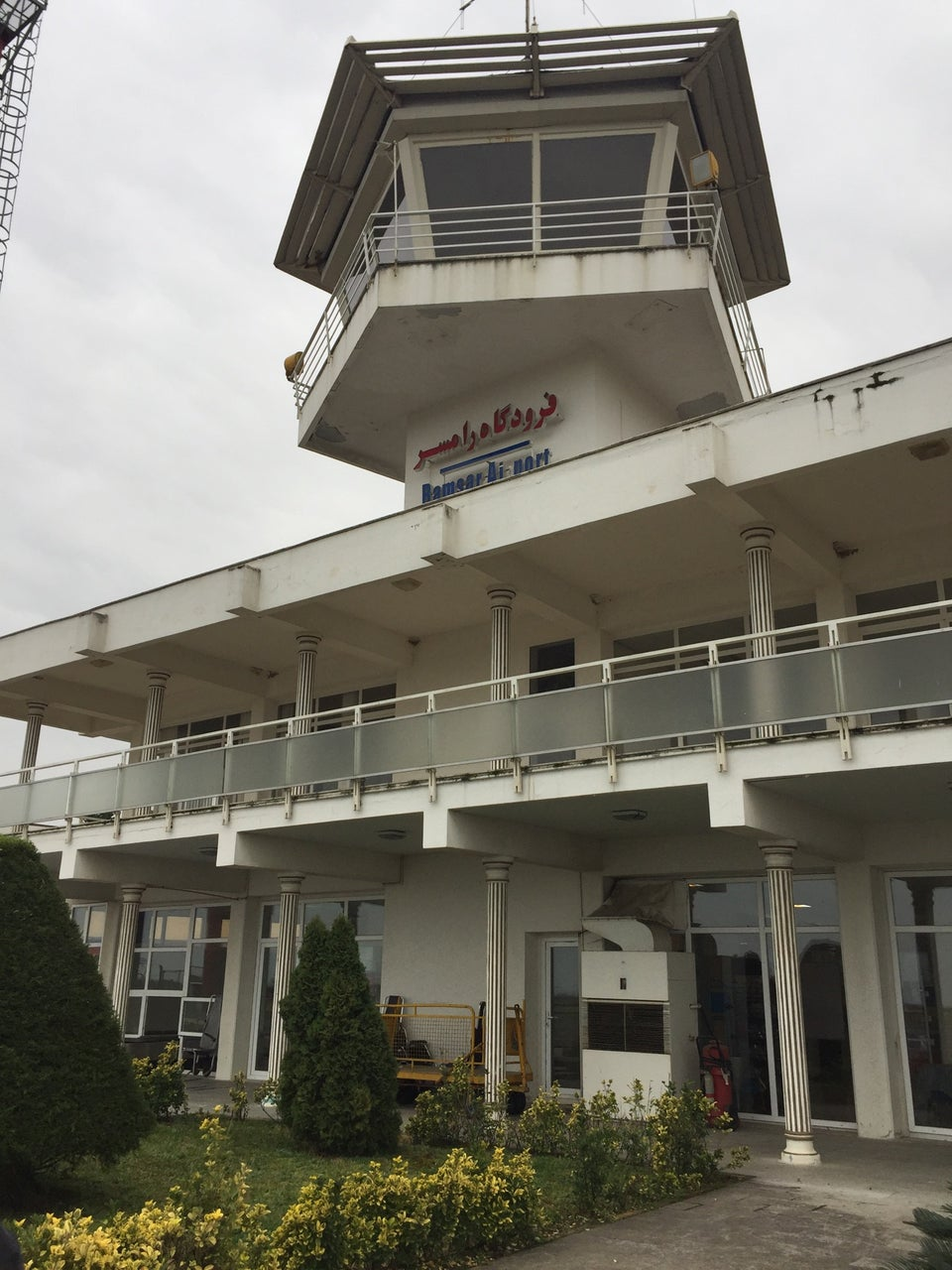
- IATA: RZR; ICAO: OINR

Summary
- Airport type: Public
- Owner: Government of Iran
- Operator: Iran Airports Company
- Serves: Ramsar and Tonekabon, Mazandaran
- Location: Ramsar, Iran
- Elevation AMSL: −70 ft (−21 m)
- Coordinates: 36°54′35.67″N 050°40′46.52″E
- Website: ramsar.airport.ir

Map
- Location of airport in Iran

Runways
Direction	Length		Surface
Direction	m	ft	Surface
13/31	1,500	4,920	Asphalt
12/30	2,700	8,858	Concrete

Statistics (2017)
- Aircraft Movements: 1,698 ▲91%
- Passengers: 88,441 ▲89%
- Cargo: 615 tons ▲85%
- Source: Iran Airports Company

Ramsar International Airport (IATA: RZR, ICAO: OINR) (Persian: فرودگاه بین المللی رامسر) is an international airport in Ramsar, Mazandaran province, Iran.

Ramsar was one of the popular cities of northern Iran during the Pahlavi era and the airport was constructed to serve tourists visiting the city. Mohammad Reza Shah and other members of the Pahlavi family also had palaces in Ramsar, and the airport was built to serve the former royal family of Iran as well as the foreign officials visiting the Shah from Tehran. The airport also offered special flights for employees of National Iranian Oil Company to bring them from Ahvaz to the north of Iran.

Nowadays Ramsar International Airport is used for private and spirt flights along the Caspian Sea coasts as well as weekly public flights to Tehran and Mashhad.

== Airlines and destinations ==
Airlines	Destinations
Iran Air	Tehran–Mehrabad
Iran Aseman Airlines	Mashhad, Tehran–Mehrabad
