= Ramsar Hotel =

Hotel in Iran

Coordinates: 36.9025°N 50.6588°E

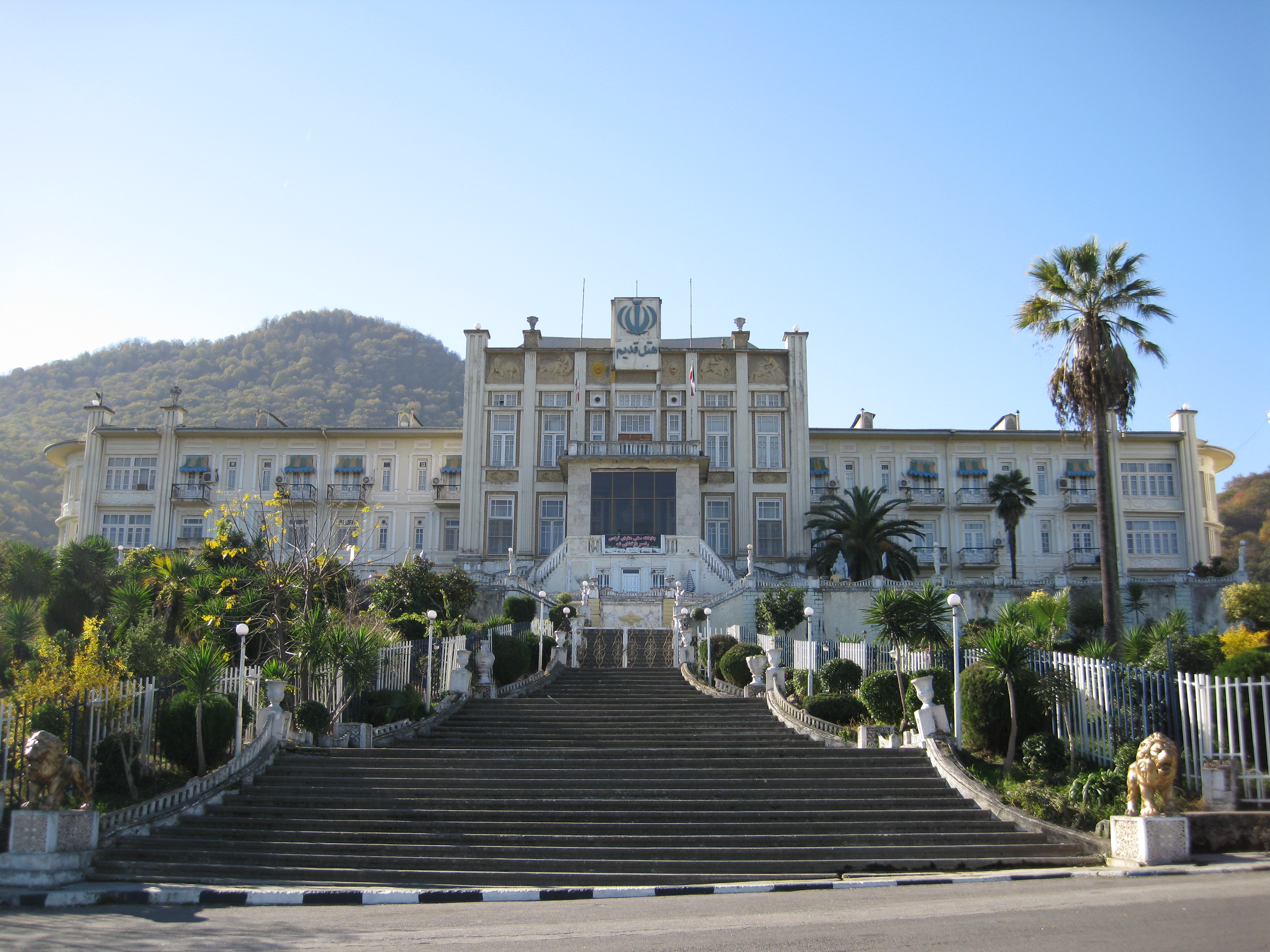
- Type: Government-owned
- Industry: Tourism – monument
- Founded: 1933
- Founder: Reza Shah Pahlavi
- Headquarters: Ramsar, Mazandaran province, Iran
- Area served: Iran
- Products: Art Deco
- Website: www.Parsianramsar.pih.ir

Ramsar Hotel, also known as Grand Ramsar Hotel, Ramsar Old Hotel and, Ramsar Azadi Hotel is a hotel and resort in Ramsar, Iran. The resort includes a hotel, as well as a range of new and old coastal motels. The hotel has 177 guest rooms and is equipped with modern facilities. Built in 1933 during the Pahlavi era, it has architectural properties in the city center.

== Gallery ==
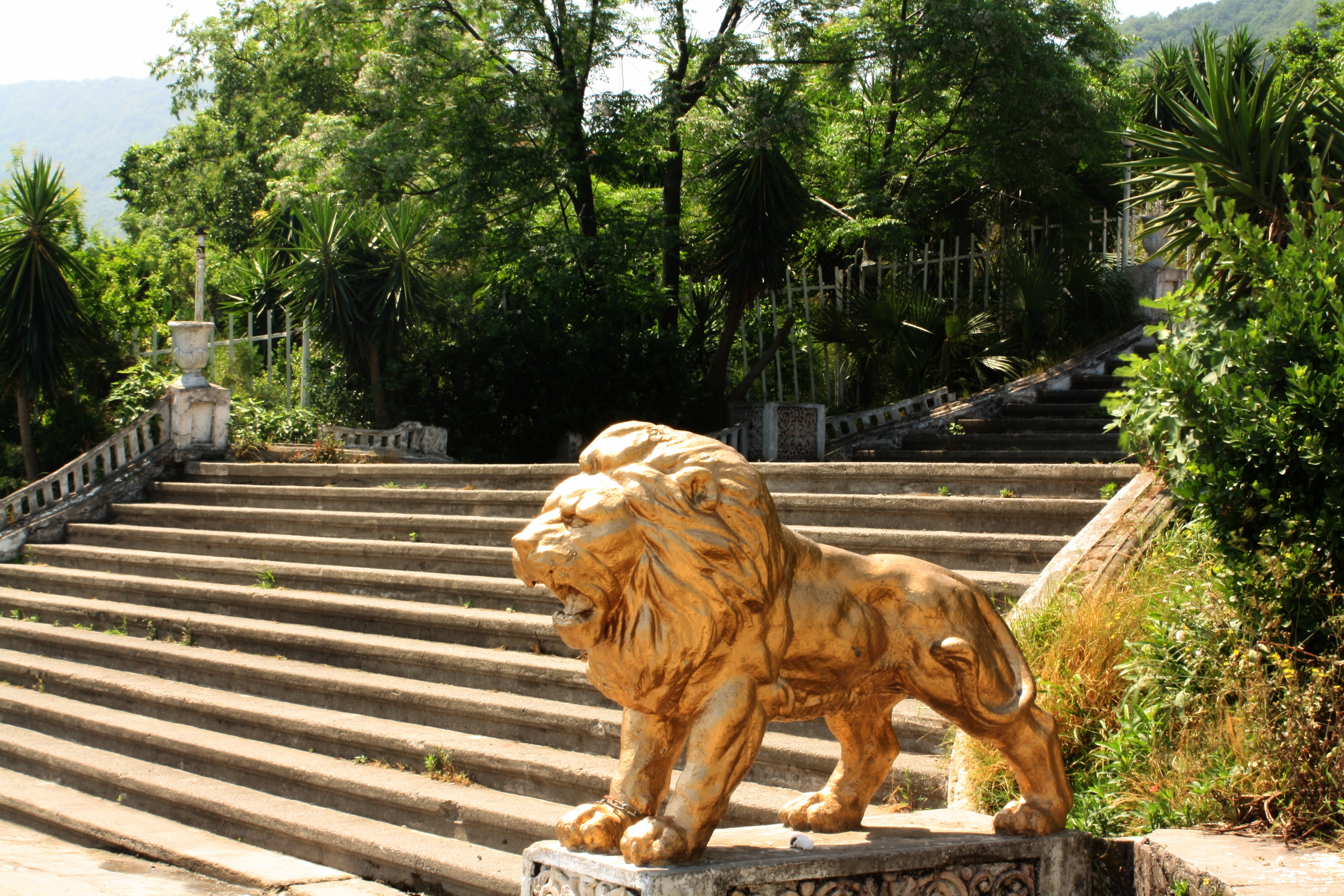
Lion at Ramsar old Hotel

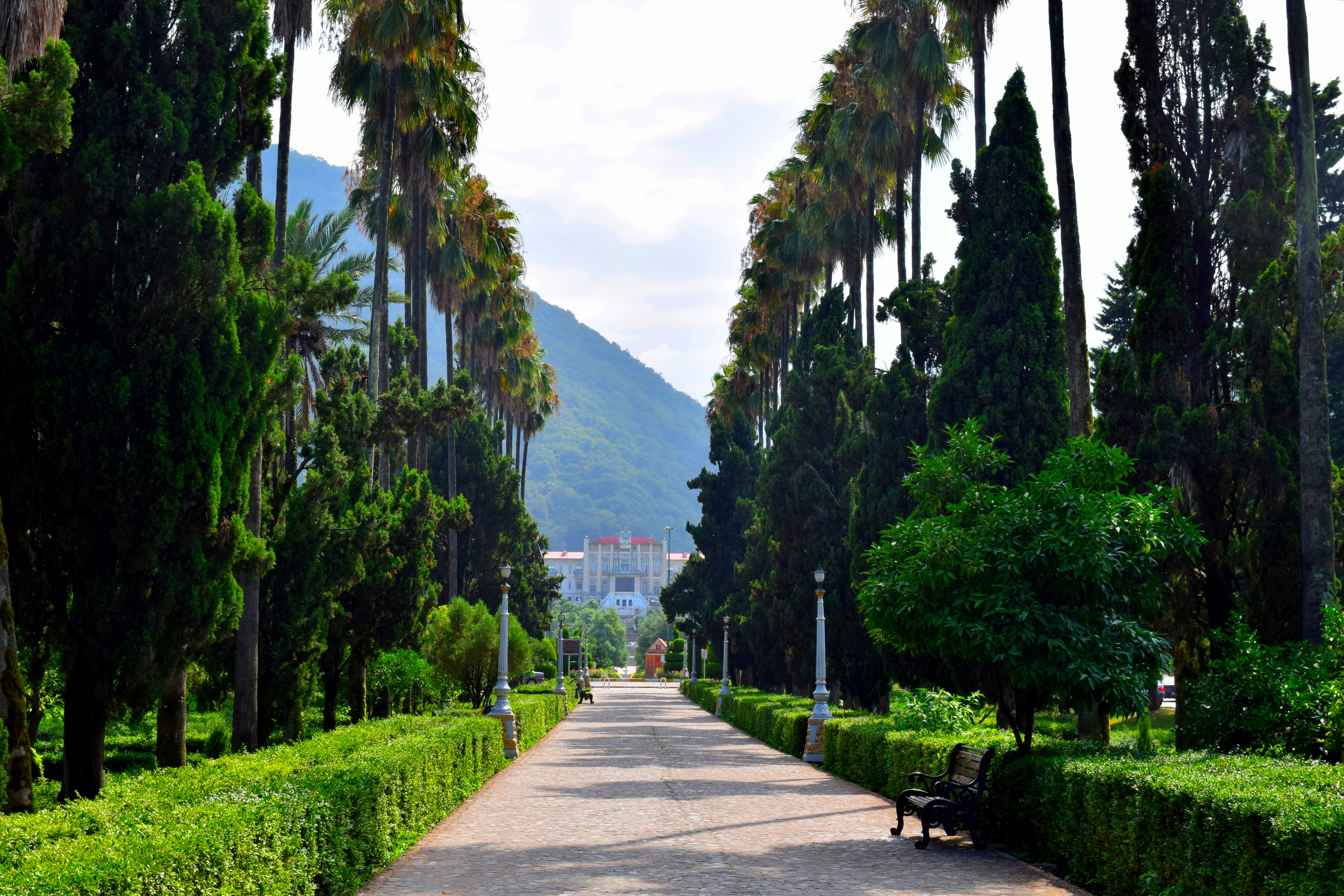
Ramsar Hotel Boulevard

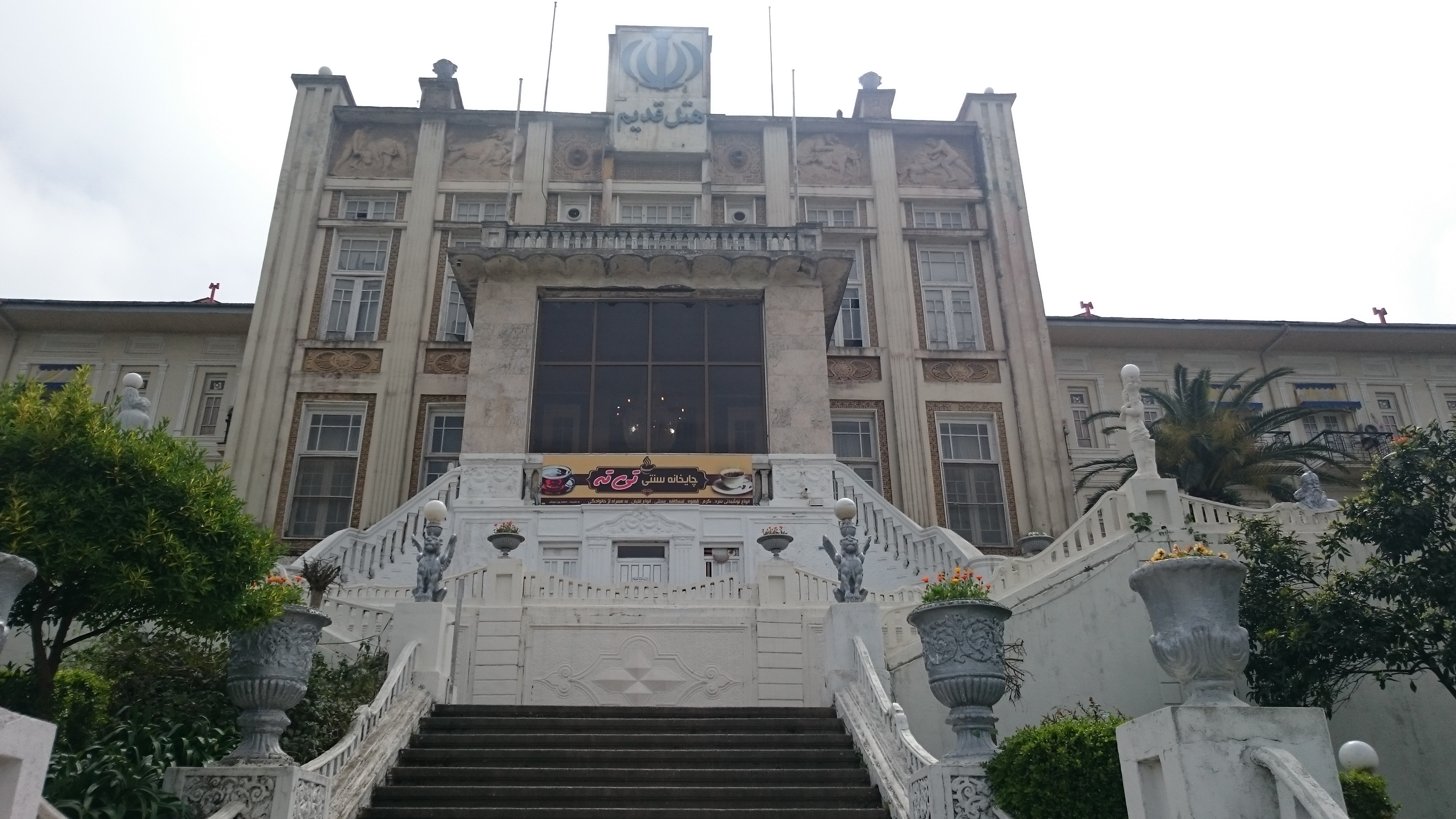
Ramsar old Hotel

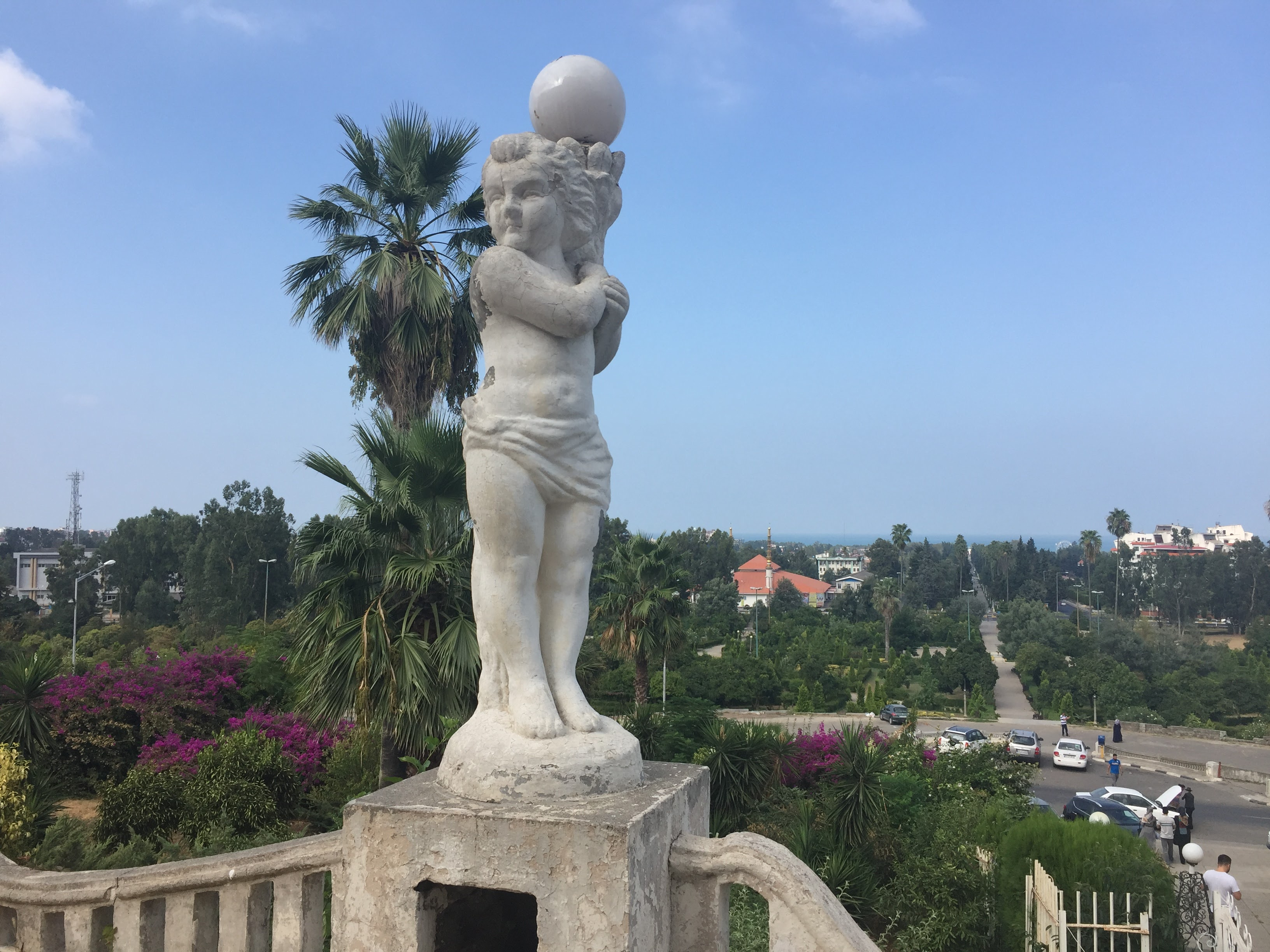
Statue on the balcony

== See also ==
- Tourism in Iran
