= Bijan Elahi =

Iranian poet and translator

- بیژن الهی
- Born: 7 July 1945; Tehran, Iran
- Died: 1 December 2010 (aged 65); Tehran, Iran
- Occupation(s): Poet, translator
- Spouses: Ghazaleh Alizadeh (m. 1969, divorced) Zhaleh Kazemi (m. 1988; div. 2000)
- Children: 1

Bijan Elahi (Persian: بیژن الهی; pronounced [biː'ʒæn elɑː'hiː]; 7 July 1945 – 1 December 2010) was an Iranian modernist poet and translator. He was for most of his life known as a leading figure of a modernist poetry movement in Iran called The Other Poetry (شعر دیگر).

Elahi's poems were posthumously published in two volumes: Vision (2014) and Youths (2015). Youths brings together what the poet’s calls his “young poems” (Javaniha, 233), many of which had been published in serial form prior to the 1979 revolution. Vision is a collection of four poem cycles that indicate the fullness of Elahi’s contribution to Persian literature.

Rebecca Ruth Gould and Kayvan Tahmasebian have argued that "A considerable strand of Persian poetry today is directly and indirectly inspired by Elahi's inventions and inspirations."

Elahi's poems have appeared in English in Poetry Wales, Waxwing, The McNeese Review, and Tin House.The first book-length translation of his poetry appeared in 2019 under the title High Tide of the Eyes: Poems by Bijan Elahi, translated by Rebecca Ruth Gould and Kayvan Tahmasebian.
