= Ramsar Palace =

Museum and former royal residence in Iran

The Ramsar Marble Palace
- کاخ مرمر رامسر
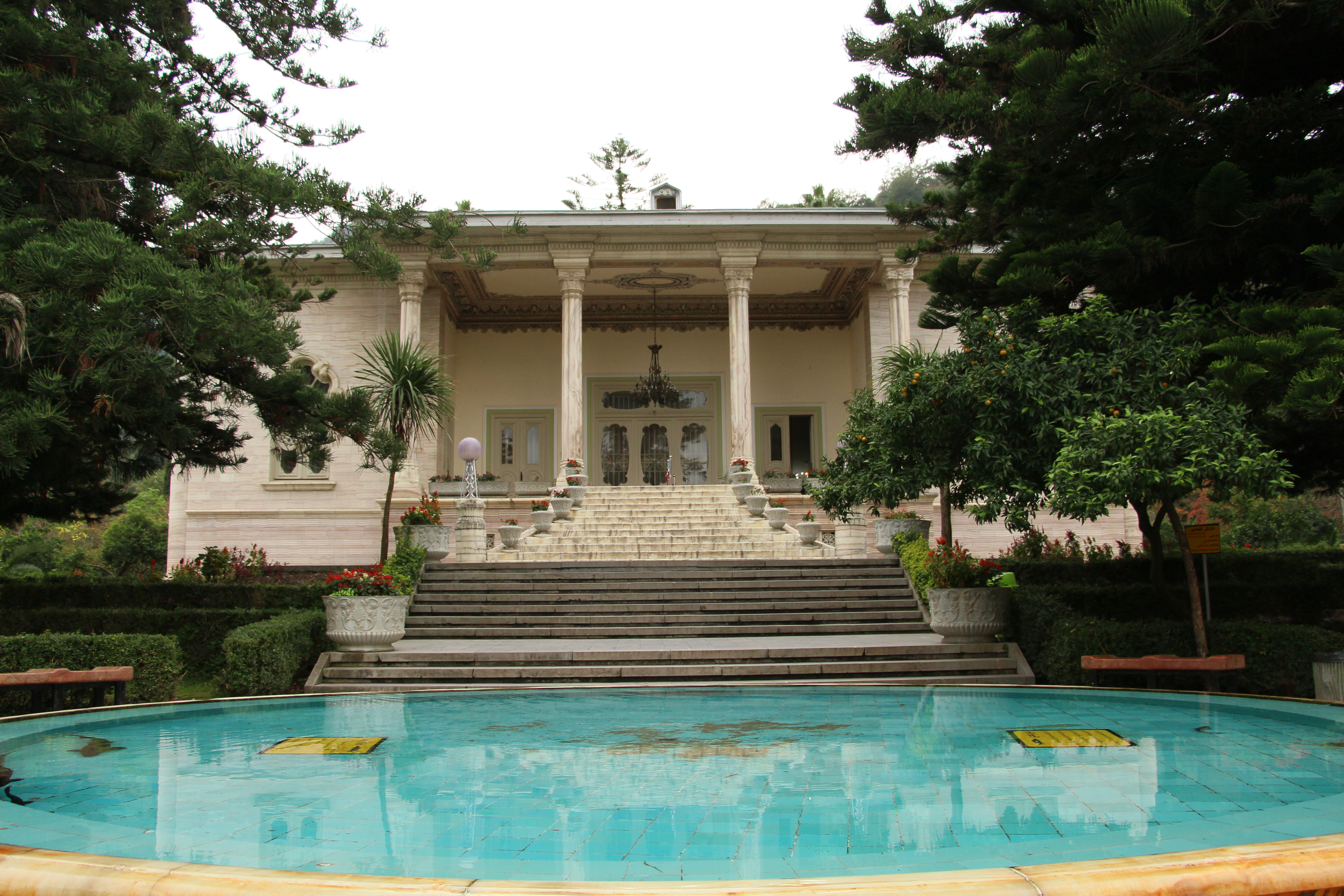
- Interactive map of the The Ramsar Marble Palace area

General information
- Location: Ramsar, Iran
- Coordinates: 36°54′11″N 50°39′30″E
- Completed: 1937; 89 years ago
- Client: Reza Shah

Technical details
- Size: 60,000 square meters (land area)

The Ramsar Palace or Marmar Palace is a historic royal residence located in Ramsar, on Iran's Caspian coast.

== History ==
The Ramsar Palace was established on a land of 60,000 square meters in 1937. The area was a historic garden in Ramsar. Crown Prince Mohammad Reza Pahlavi's companion Ernest Perron was sent to the palace to work as the head gardener shortly after the completion of the construction.

The palace was used as a summer residence by Reza Shah and then by his son, Mohammad Reza Pahlavi. Mohammad Reza Pahlavi and his second spouse Soraya Esfendiary-Bakhtiary spent their honeymoon in the palace. They also frequently went there when they came across political crisis in Tehran.

== Technical features ==
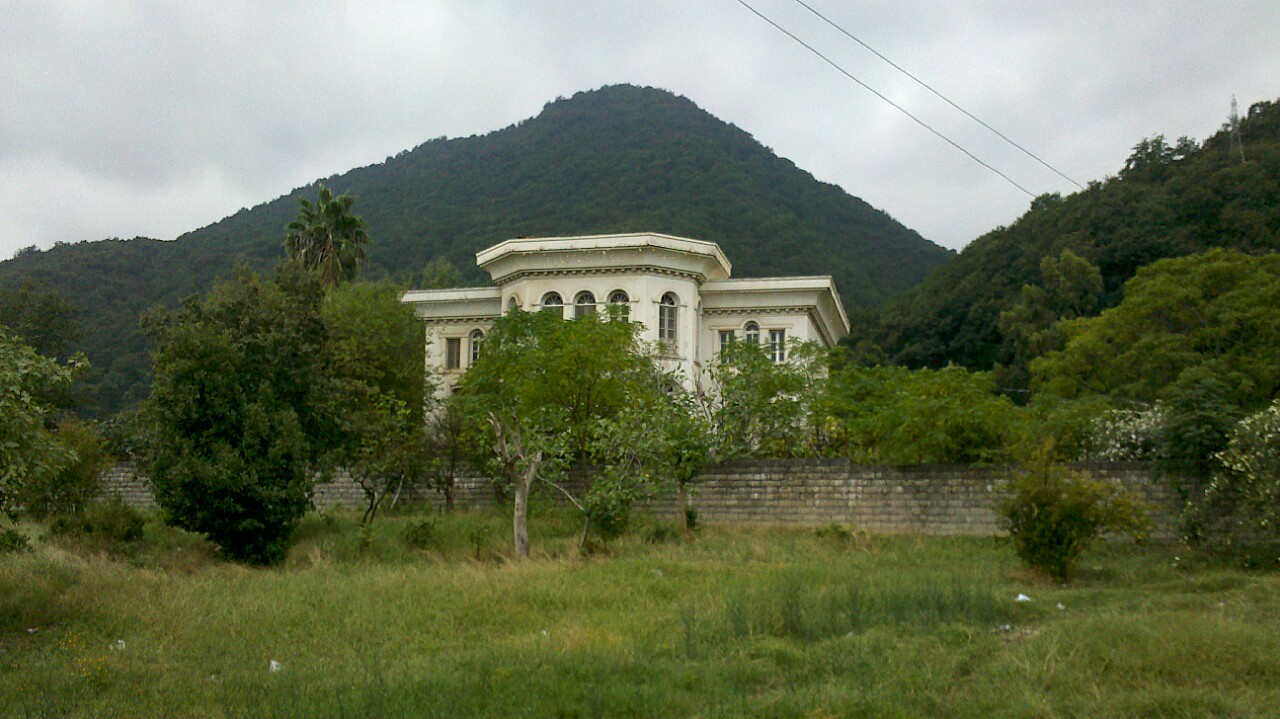
Ramsar Palace

The Ramsar Palace is a compact and modest residence with 600 square metres (6,500 sq ft) square meters area although it lies on a land of 60,000 square meters. It is a rectangular building with a single story, and is decorated with works by famous Iranian sculptors and painters. The front line of the palace is made up of carved marble stones which were made by local artists. The common materials used are plaster and mirror in addition to marble. There is a reception hall or central hall in the place which has wooden floor.

== Current usage ==
The palace has been used as a museum since 2000. It is called the Ramsar Palace museum or the Caspian museum and is known by locals as “Tamashagah Khazar".

== Gallery ==
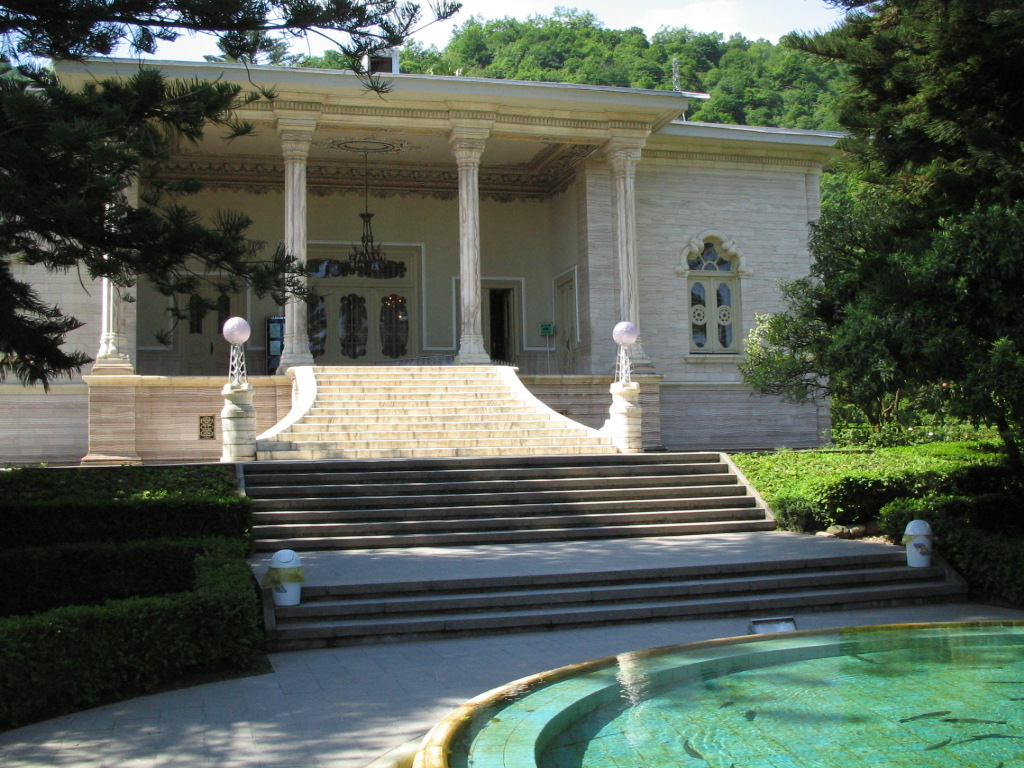
A pond in front of the iwan

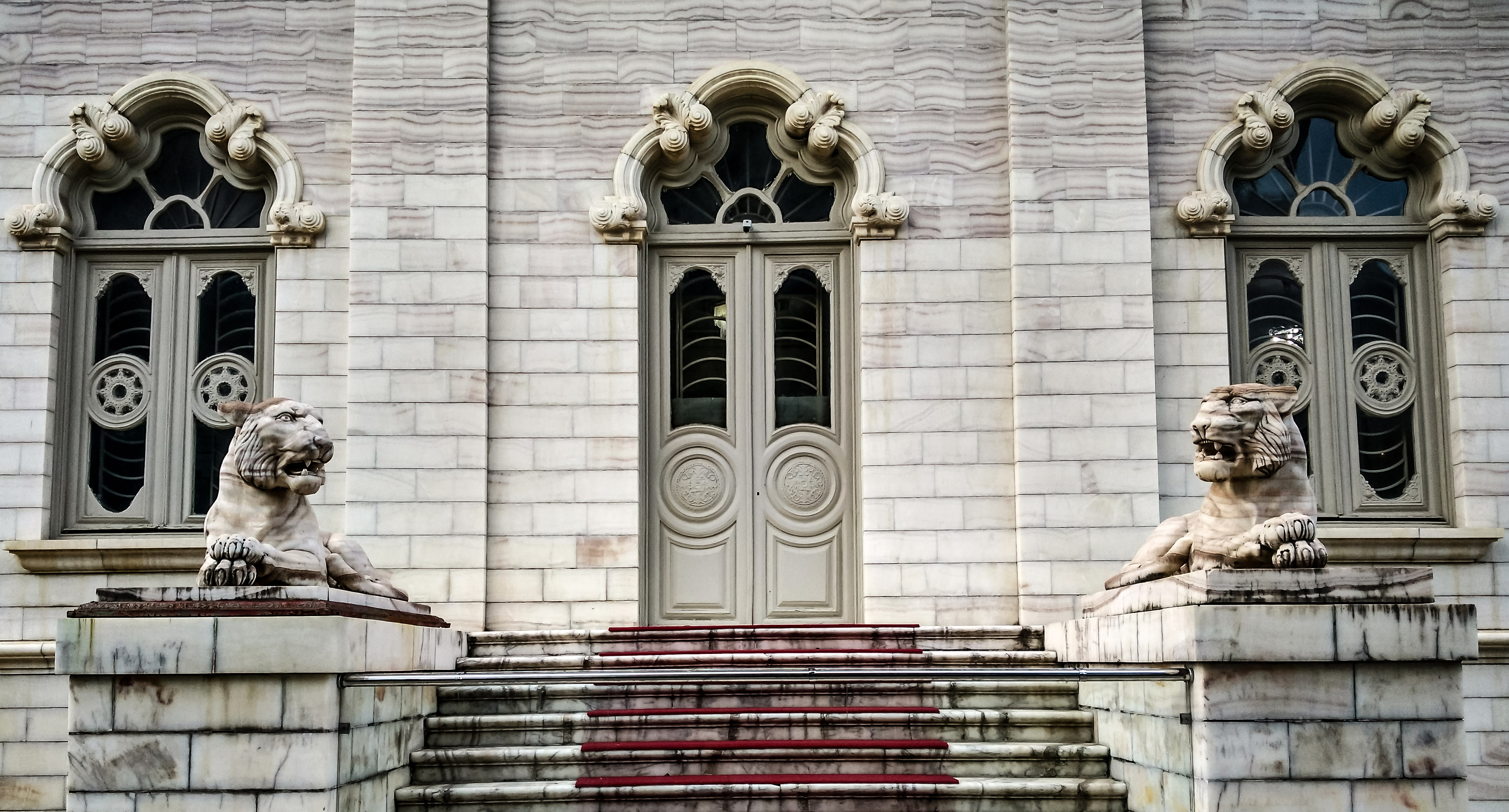
The back facade

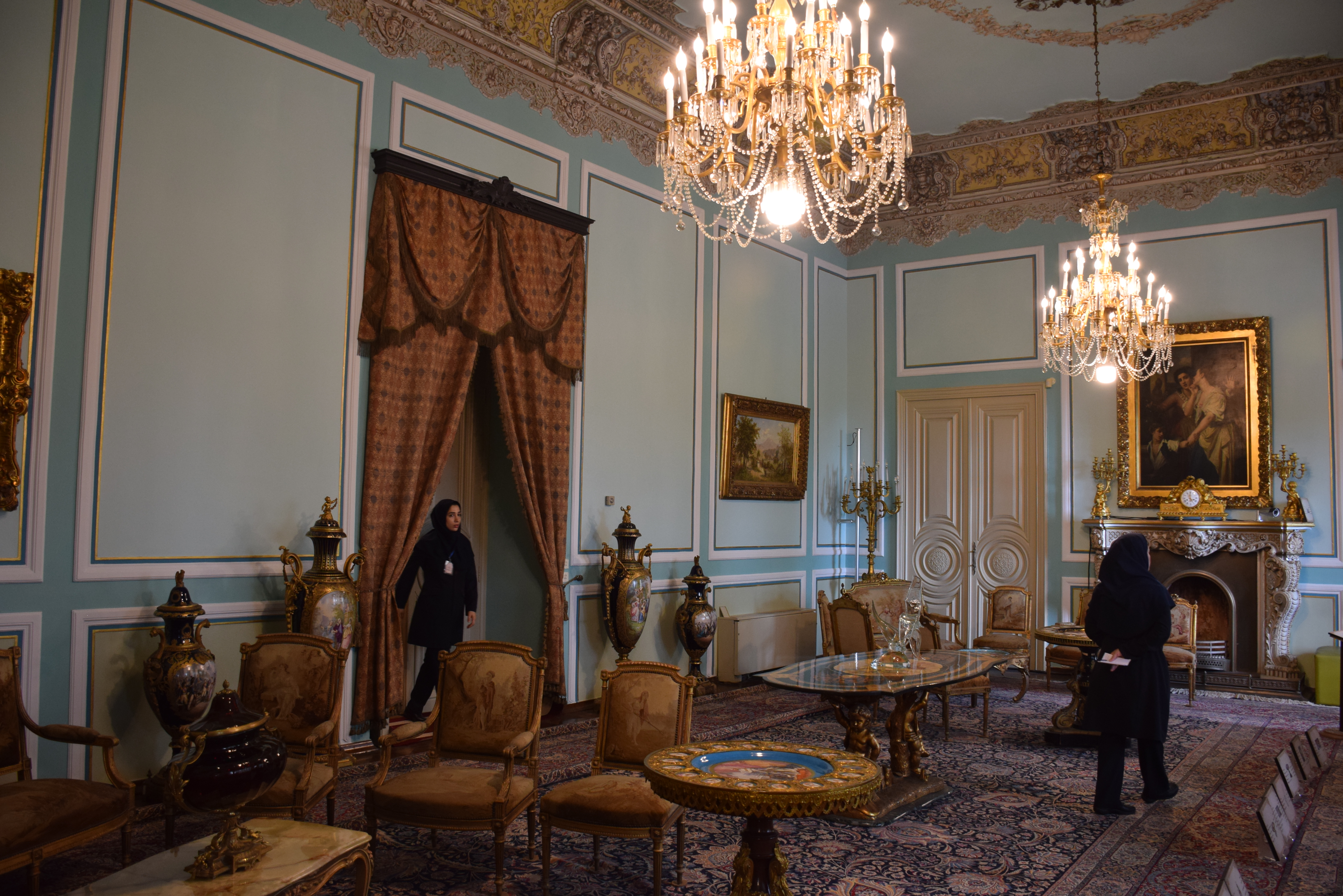
The guest room

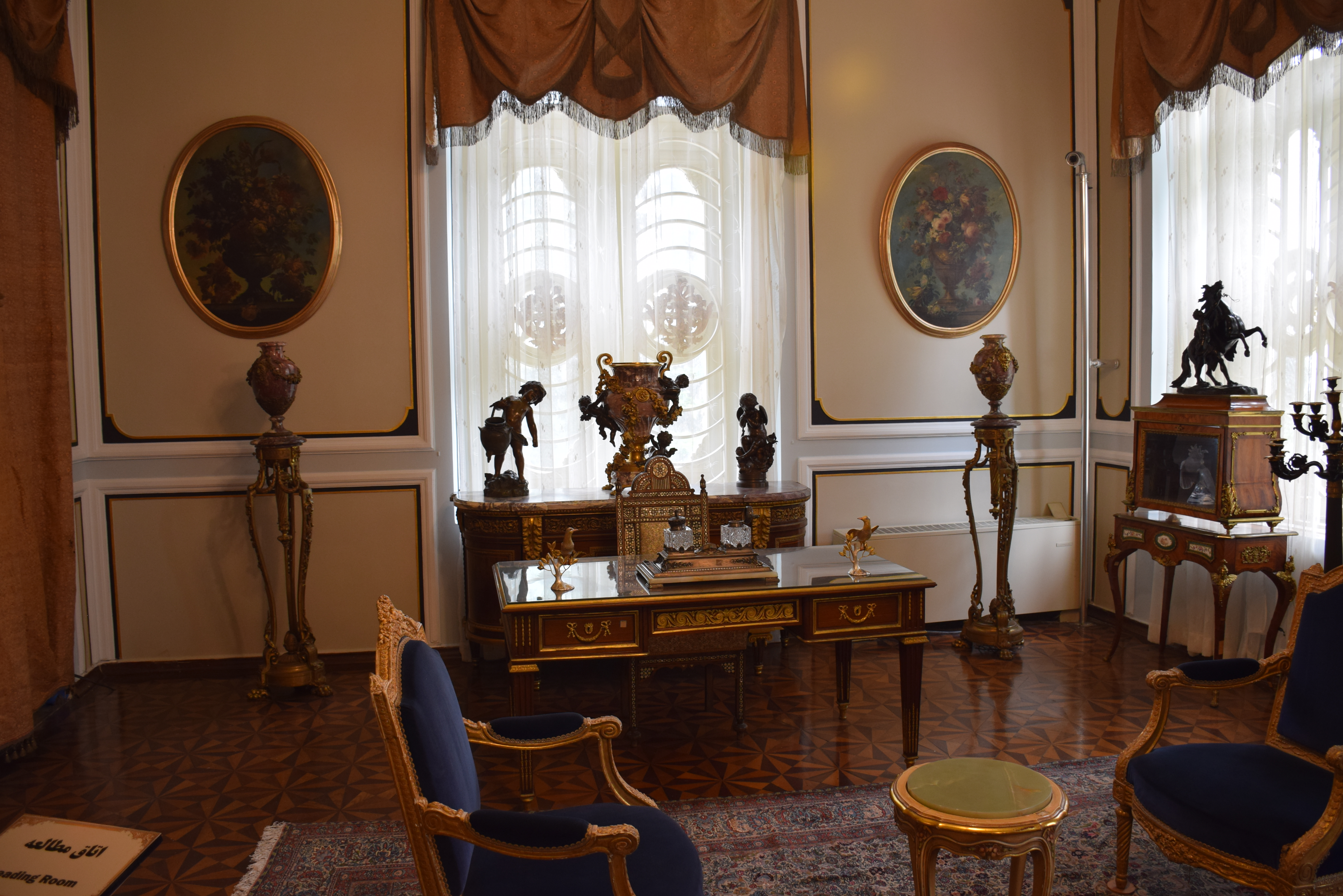
The study room

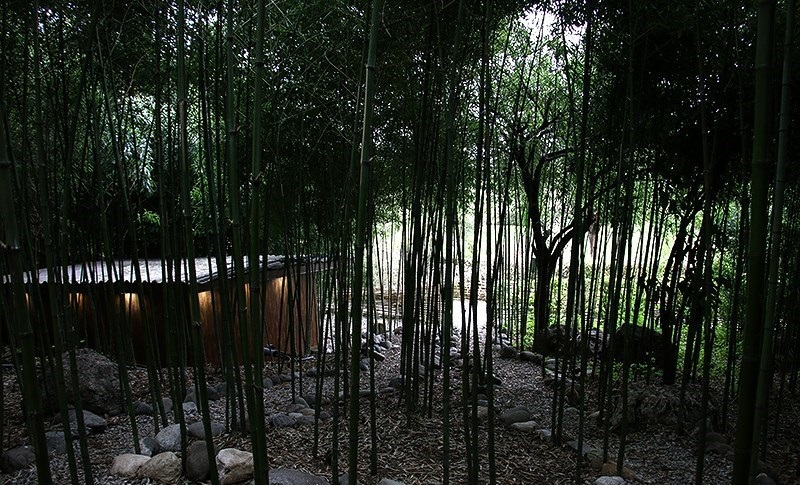
The gardens of the palace
