= Ramsar, Iran =

City in Mazandaran province, Iran

Ramsar Persian: رامسر
- City
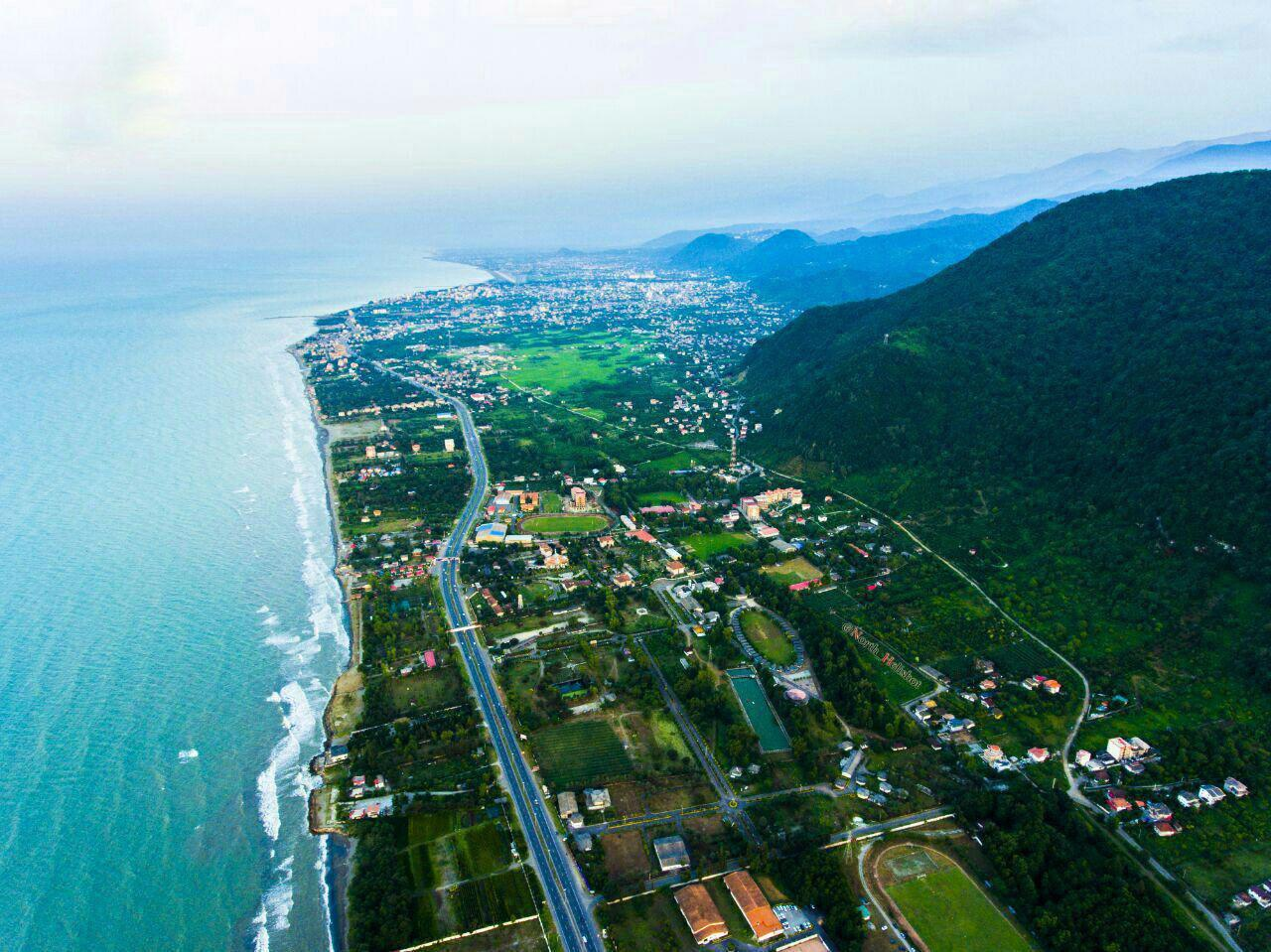
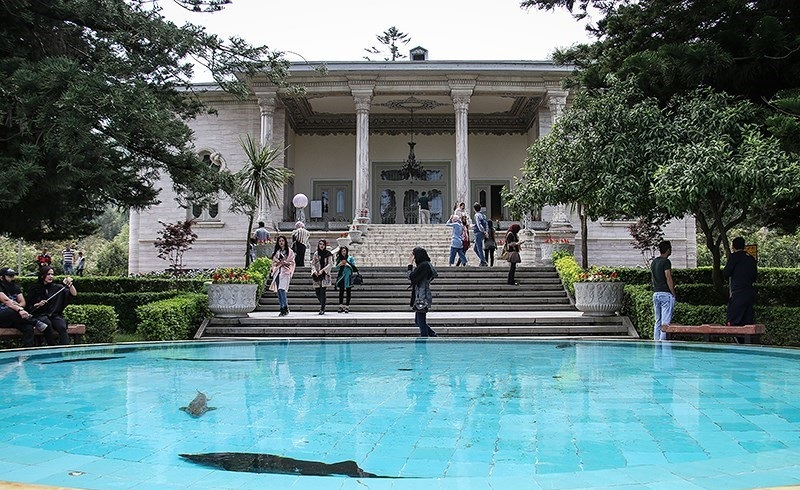
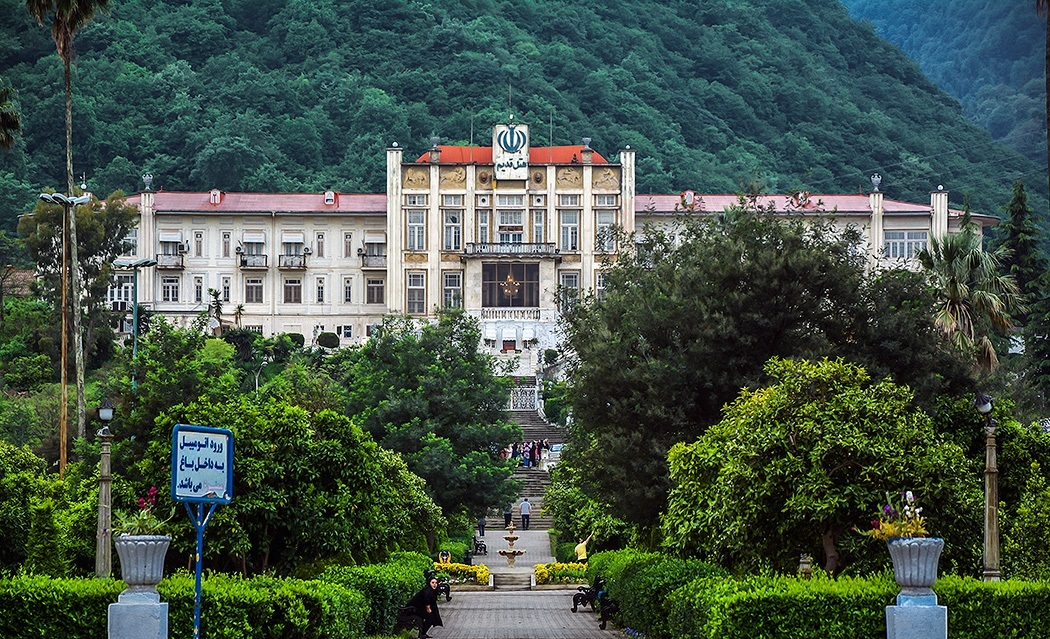
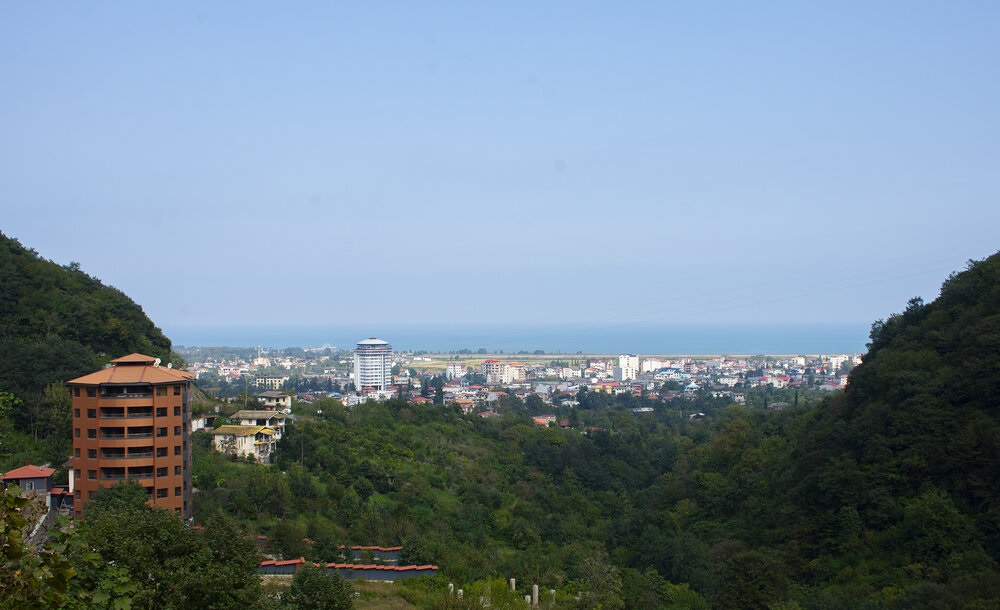
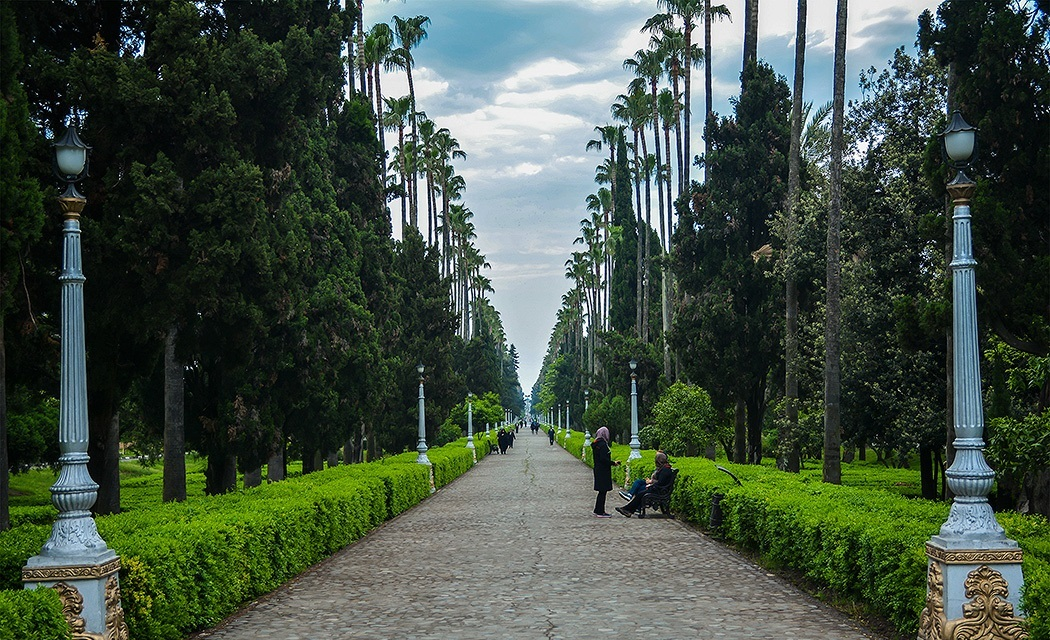
- Motto: Bride of Iranian cities (عروس شهرهای ایران)
- Location of Ramsar in Iran Ramsar (Caspian Sea)
- Coordinates: 36°55′21″N 50°38′35″E
- Country: Iran
- Province: Mazandaran
- County: Ramsar
- District: Central
- Established: 1943

Government
  - Mayor (Ŝahrdār): Ali Aminishad
- Elevation: −21 m (−69 ft)

Population (2016)
  - Total: 35,997
- Time zone: UTC+3:30 (IRST)
- Website: www.sh-ramsar.ir/%20Sh-Ramsar.ir

Ramsar (Persian: رامسر) (Note: Also romanized as Rámsar; also known as Ránsar; formerly known as Sakht Sar) is a city in the Central District of Ramsar County, Mazandaran province, Iran, serving as capital of both the county and the district. It also serves as the administrative center for Sakht Sar Rural District.

== History ==
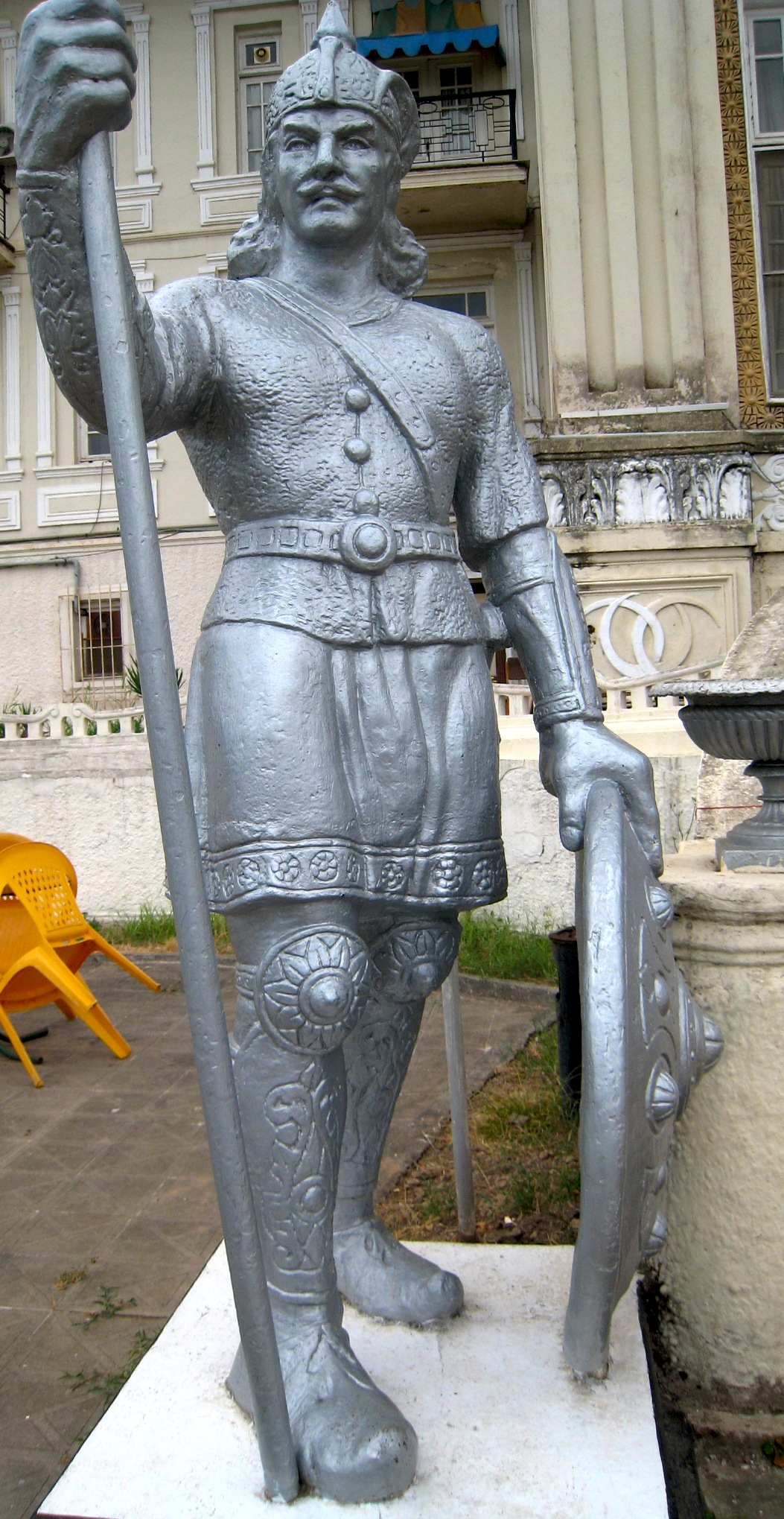
Statue of Esfandiyar located in Ramsar.

In 1971, Ramsar hosted the Ramsar Convention on Wetlands of International Importance, also known as the Convention on Wetlands. This international treaty for the conservation and sustainable use of designated wetlands (which under the treaty are known as Ramsar sites) was signed in and named after the city of Ramsar.

== Overview ==
Ramsar lies on the Caspian Sea. It was also known as Sakhtsar in the past. The climate of Ramsar is hot and humid in summer and mild in winter. The proximity of the forest and the sea in this city attracts tourists in all seasons. Ramsar has an airport. The city of Ramsar was a small village in western Mazandaran until the Qajar era, and during the first Pahlavi era, under the rule of Reza Shah and with the support of the government, it became a city with many tourist facilities.

Ramsar is the westernmost county and city in Mazandaran. It borders the Caspian Sea to the north, Rudsar county of Gilan province to the west, Qazvin Province to the south, and Tonekabon to the east.

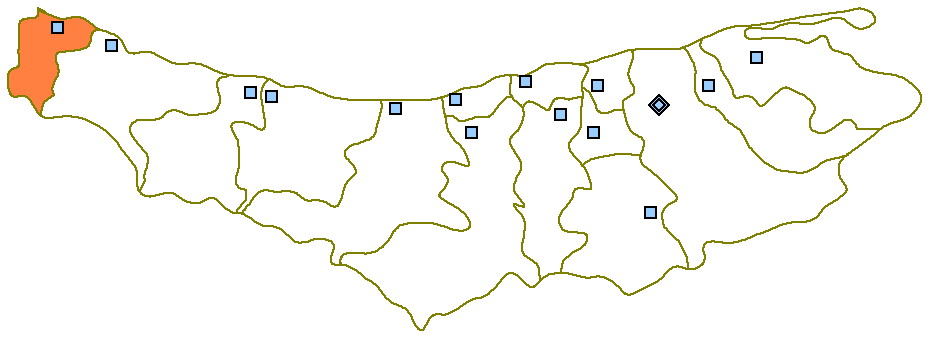
Map showing position of Ramsar county as well as Ramsar city in Mazandaran province

== Demographics ==
=== Language and ethnicity ===
The Mazanderani people form the majority of the city's population. Due to its proximity to Gilan, some of the city's population are immigrants from this province and dialect of Gilaki is similar to that found in eastern Gilan and belongs to the Eastern or Bie-Pish branch.

=== Population ===
At the time of the 2006 National Census, the city's population was 31,659 in 9,241 households. The following census in 2011 counted 32,294 people in 10,432 households. The 2016 census measured the population of the city as 35,997 people in 12,153 households.

== Geography ==
=== Climate ===
Ramsar has a humid subtropical climate (Köppen: Cfa, Trewartha: Cf), with warm, humid summers and cool, damp winters. Ramsar is the cloudiest city in Iran, as well as one of the cloudiest cities of this latitude, with annual sunshine of around 1582 hours. Northern Iran is separated from Central Iran by the Alborz mountains. As a result, the air in the latter region, such as in Tehran, is very dry. When driving to Ramsar from Tehran, one drives up the mountains until arriving at a tunnel. On passing through this tunnel and coming out the other side, the environment is very different; it is more humid and green due to moisture from the Caspian Sea, and this abundance of mist and rain is part of the attraction for tourists from the more arid regions of Iran.

Climate data for Ramsar (1991-2020, records 1955-2020)
Month	Jan	Feb	Mar	Apr	May	Jun	Jul	Aug	Sep	Oct	Nov	Dec	Year
Record high °C (°F)	31.0 (87.8)	28.4 (83.1)	36.8 (98.2)	37.0 (98.6)	34.4 (93.9)	38.0 (100.4)	35.6 (96.1)	35.6 (96.1)	35.2 (95.4)	37.0 (98.6)	32.0 (89.6)	29.0 (84.2)	38.0 (100.4)
Mean daily maximum °C (°F)	11.4 (52.5)	10.9 (51.6)	12.9 (55.2)	16.6 (61.9)	21.9 (71.4)	26.8 (80.2)	29.2 (84.6)	29.7 (85.5)	26.5 (79.7)	22.3 (72.1)	17.1 (62.8)	13.4 (56.1)	19.9 (67.8)
Daily mean °C (°F)	8.0 (46.4)	7.7 (45.9)	9.8 (49.6)	13.4 (56.1)	18.8 (65.8)	23.6 (74.5)	26.0 (78.8)	26.4 (79.5)	23.4 (74.1)	19.0 (66.2)	13.6 (56.5)	9.9 (49.8)	16.6 (61.9)
Mean daily minimum °C (°F)	5.0 (41.0)	4.9 (40.8)	7.2 (45.0)	10.7 (51.3)	15.8 (60.4)	20.4 (68.7)	22.9 (73.2)	23.3 (73.9)	20.6 (69.1)	16.0 (60.8)	10.8 (51.4)	6.9 (44.4)	13.7 (56.7)
Record low °C (°F)	−10.0 (14.0)	−6.0 (21.2)	−3.0 (26.6)	0.0 (32.0)	5.0 (41.0)	9.0 (48.2)	10.8 (51.4)	16.0 (60.8)	10.0 (50.0)	5.0 (41.0)	−1.2 (29.8)	−2.0 (28.4)	−10.0 (14.0)
Average precipitation mm (inches)	77.2 (3.04)	87.2 (3.43)	89.1 (3.51)	66.6 (2.62)	36.4 (1.43)	51.3 (2.02)	49.3 (1.94)	52.3 (2.06)	168.3 (6.63)	280.0 (11.02)	182.7 (7.19)	98.0 (3.86)	1,238.4 (48.76)
Average precipitation days (≥ 1.0 mm)	7.5	8.2	9.7	8.5	7.0	4.5	4.3	5.0	8.1	9.3	9.7	7.4	89.2
Average relative humidity (%)	81	83	84	85	82	77	76	76	80	82	82	81	80.8
Average dew point °C (°F)	4.9 (40.8)	4.8 (40.6)	7.1 (44.8)	10.8 (51.4)	15.8 (60.4)	19.3 (66.7)	21.4 (70.5)	21.8 (71.2)	19.7 (67.5)	15.8 (60.4)	10.5 (50.9)	6.8 (44.2)	13.2 (55.8)
Mean monthly sunshine hours	105	93	102	122	175	206	196	186	134	129	107	103	1,658
Source 1: NOAA NCEI
Source 2: IRIMO (records)

Climate data for Ramsar (1955–2010, records 1955-2020)
Month	Jan	Feb	Mar	Apr	May	Jun	Jul	Aug	Sep	Oct	Nov	Dec	Year
Record high °C (°F)	31.0 (87.8)	28.4 (83.1)	36.8 (98.2)	37.0 (98.6)	34.4 (93.9)	38.0 (100.4)	35.6 (96.1)	35.6 (96.1)	35.2 (95.4)	37.0 (98.6)	32.0 (89.6)	29.0 (84.2)	38.0 (100.4)
Mean daily maximum °C (°F)	10.9 (51.6)	10.6 (51.1)	11.9 (53.4)	16.4 (61.5)	21.4 (70.5)	25.9 (78.6)	28.6 (83.5)	28.8 (83.8)	25.8 (78.4)	21.8 (71.2)	17.3 (63.1)	13.5 (56.3)	19.4 (66.9)
Daily mean °C (°F)	7.4 (45.3)	7.3 (45.1)	9.1 (48.4)	13.3 (55.9)	18.2 (64.8)	22.6 (72.7)	25.2 (77.4)	25.4 (77.7)	22.7 (72.9)	18.4 (65.1)	13.7 (56.7)	9.8 (49.6)	16.1 (61.0)
Mean daily minimum °C (°F)	4.0 (39.2)	4.1 (39.4)	6.3 (43.3)	10.1 (50.2)	14.9 (58.8)	19.2 (66.6)	21.7 (71.1)	22.0 (71.6)	19.5 (67.1)	15.1 (59.2)	10.1 (50.2)	6.1 (43.0)	12.8 (55.0)
Record low °C (°F)	−10.0 (14.0)	−6.0 (21.2)	−3.0 (26.6)	0.0 (32.0)	5.0 (41.0)	9.0 (48.2)	10.8 (51.4)	16.0 (60.8)	10.0 (50.0)	5.0 (41.0)	−1.2 (29.8)	−2.0 (28.4)	−10.0 (14.0)
Average precipitation mm (inches)	78.4 (3.09)	73.5 (2.89)	85.2 (3.35)	53.3 (2.10)	46.1 (1.81)	57.9 (2.28)	38.0 (1.50)	65.4 (2.57)	161.5 (6.36)	260.2 (10.24)	177.4 (6.98)	109.3 (4.30)	1,206.2 (47.47)
Average precipitation days (≥ 1.0 mm)	9.0	8.7	11.0	8.3	7.3	4.9	3.9	6.6	8.6	11.6	9.2	8.8	97.9
Average snowy days	0.8	1.1	0.5	0.0	0.0	0.0	0.0	0.0	0.0	0.0	0.0	0.2	2.6
Average relative humidity (%)	84	85	87	86	84	81	79	81	84	85	84	84	84
Average dew point °C (°F)	4.9 (40.8)	4.8 (40.6)	7.1 (44.8)	10.8 (51.4)	15.8 (60.4)	19.3 (66.7)	21.4 (70.5)	21.8 (71.2)	19.7 (67.5)	15.8 (60.4)	10.5 (50.9)	6.8 (44.2)	13.2 (55.8)
Mean monthly sunshine hours	105.6	97.1	92.7	119.7	165.5	189.6	188.9	168.7	126.1	119.1	111.1	98.2	1,582.3
Source 1: IRIMO (records)
Source 2: NOAA(dew point 1991-2020)

=== Radioactivity ===
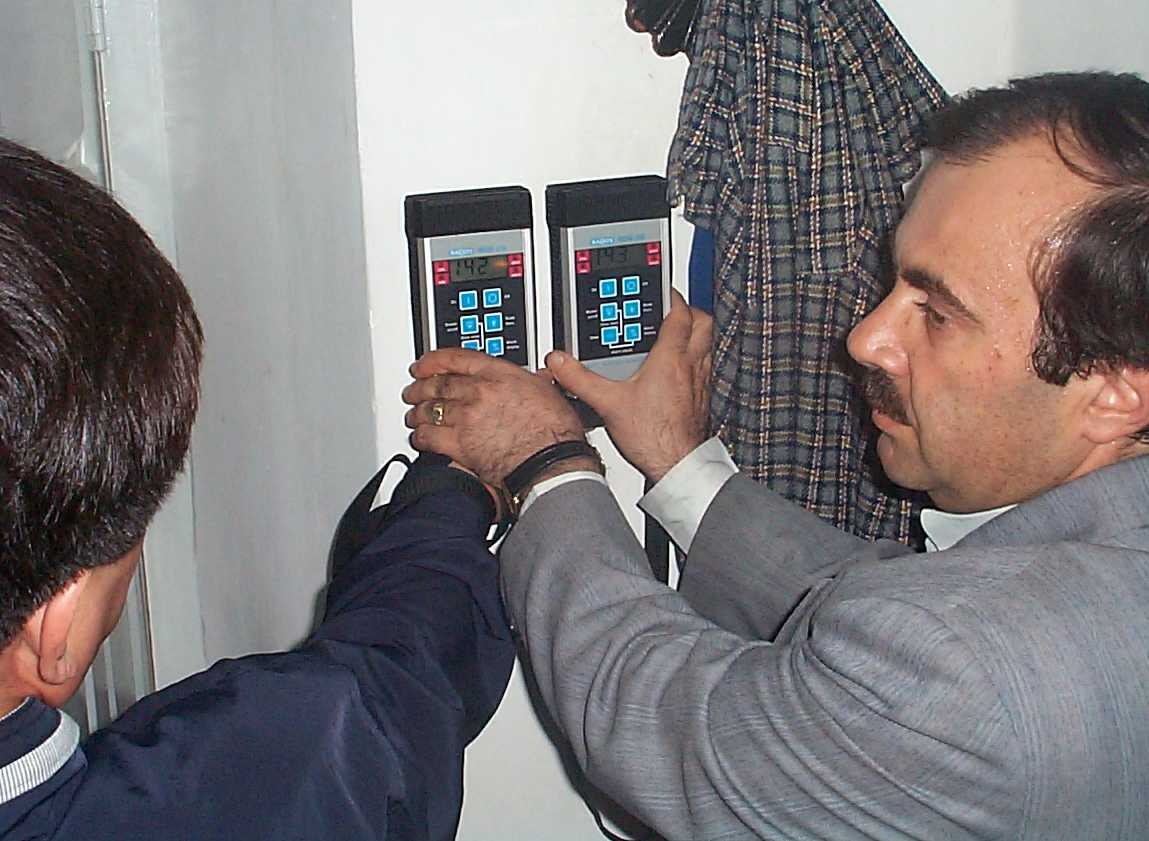
Two survey meters show dose rates of 142 and 143 μSv/h on contact with a bedroom wall.

Ramsar's Talesh Mahalleh district is the most radioactive inhabited area known on Earth, due to nearby hot springs and building materials originating from around them. A combined population of 2,000 residents from this district and other high radiation neighborhoods receive an average radiation dose of 10 mSv per year, ten times more than the ICRP-recommended limit for exposure to the public from artificial sources.

Record levels were found in a house where the effective radiation dose due to external radiation was 131 mSv/a, and the committed dose from radon was 72 mSv/a. This unique case is over 80 times higher than the world average background radiation.

One of the most commonly used models of radiation-induced cancer posits that the risk rises linearly with dose at a rate of 5% per Sv. If this linear no-threshold model is correct, it should be possible to observe an increased incidence of cancer in Ramsar through careful long-term studies currently underway. Early anecdotal evidence from local doctors and preliminary cytogenetic studies suggested that there may be no such harmful effect, and possibly even a radio-adaptive effect. More recent epidemiological data show a slightly reduced lung cancer rate and non-significantly elevated morbidity, but the small size of the population (only 1800 inhabitants in the highest-irradiated areas) will require a longer monitoring period to draw definitive conclusions.

Furthermore, there are questions regarding possible non-cancer effects of the radiation background. An Iranian study has shown that people in the area have a significantly higher expression of the CD69 gene and a higher incidence of stable and unstable chromosomal aberrations. Chromosomal aberrations have been found in other studies. Pending further study, the potential health risks had moved scientists in 2001–02 to call for relocation of the residents and regulatory control of new construction.

The radioactivity is due to the local geology. Underground water dissolves radium in uraniferous igneous rock and carries it to the surface through at least nine known hot springs. These are used as spas by locals and tourists. Some of the radium precipitates into travertine, a form of limestone, and the rest diffuses into the soil, where it is absorbed by crops and mixes with drinking water. Residents have unknowingly used the radioactive limestone as a building material for their homes. The stone irradiates the inhabitants and generates radon gas which typically promotes lung cancer. Crops contribute 72 μSv/yr to a critical group of 50 residents.

=== Environmental protection ===
The Convention on Wetlands, signed in Ramsar in 1971, is an intergovernmental treaty which provides the framework for national action and international cooperation for the conservation and wise use of wetlands and their resources. There are presently 172 contracting parties to the convention, with over 2500 wetland sites, totaling almost 2,500,000 square kilometres (970,000 sq mi), designated for inclusion in the Ramsar List of Wetlands of International Importance. As of 2026, there are 172 contracting parties, up from 119 in 2000 and from 18 initial signatory nations in 1971. Signatories meet every three years as the Conference of the Contracting Parties (COP), the first held in Cagliari, Italy, in 1980. Amendments to the original convention have been agreed to in Paris (in 1982) and Regina, Canada (in 1987).

== Tourism ==
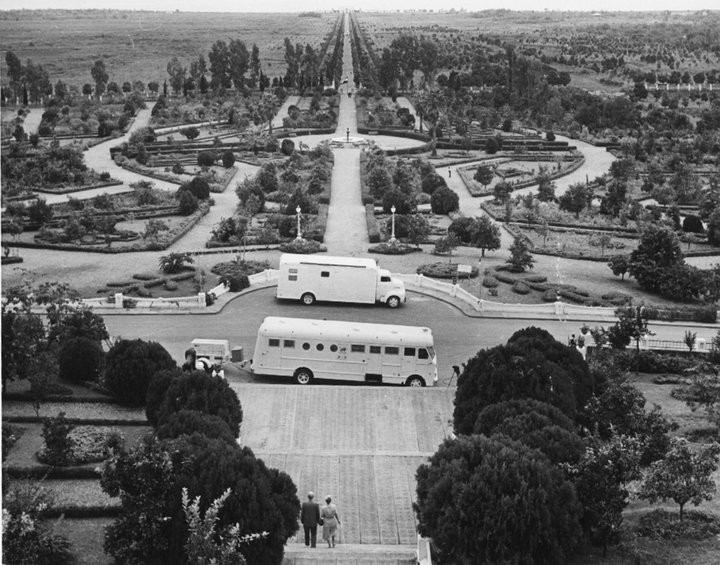
The front yard of the old hotel of Ramsar in 1973

Ramsar is a popular sea resort for Iranian tourists. The town also offers hot springs, the green forests of the Alborz Mountains, the Vacation palace of the Last Shah and the Ramsar Hotel. Twenty-seven kilometres (17 mi) south of Ramsar and 2,700 metres (8,900 ft) above sea level in the Alborz mountains is Javaher Deh village, which is an important tourist attraction in Ramsar county. The road from Ramsar to Javaher Deh connects the city to Safarood forest park. Dalkhani Forest, known as the Corridor of Paradise, a mountainous forest near Ramsar, is another natural attraction. The Ramsar Anthropological Museum is also considered a cultural attraction of the city. One of the most famous recreational complexes in the north of the country is the Ramsar Green City Recreation Complex, also known as the Ramsar Cable Car, tourist complex that opened in 2008 and one of the cable car lines in Iran began operating there. The Ramsar Cable Car has gained great fame in recent years and has been able to attract many tourists by expanding its recreational and exciting spaces, shopping and accommodation centers.

== Transport ==
=== Airport ===
Ramsar International Airport, is an international airport in Ramsar, Mazandaran province. Nowadays Ramsar Airport is used for private and spirt flights along the Caspian Sea coasts as well as weekly public flights to Tehran and Mashhad and it has an international flight to Muscat, Oman. This airport was identified and studied by German engineers in 1930 at its current location with an entrance on Moallem Boulevard (Casino) and was put into operation in 1952.

== Twin towns and sister cities ==
Ramsar is twinned with:

- Puerto Montt, Chile (since 28 January 2009)
- Al Wakrah, Qatar (since 14 June 2010)
- Shiraz, Iran (since 9 January 2013)

== Notable people ==
- Mohammad Reza Khalatbari (b. 1983) - Football player
- Esfandiar Rahim Mashaei (b. 1960) - Politician
- Abbas Ali Khalatbari (1912–1979) - Iranian diplomat
- Hossein Khalatbari (1949–1985) - Iranian fighter pilot
- Elika Abdolrazzaghi (b. 1979) - Cinema, stage and Tv actress
- Mohammad-Ali Taskhiri (1948–2020) - Iranian cleric and diplomat
- Hooman Khalatbari (b. 1969) - Music conductor
- Rahim Ebadi (b. 1957) - Politician

== Gallery ==
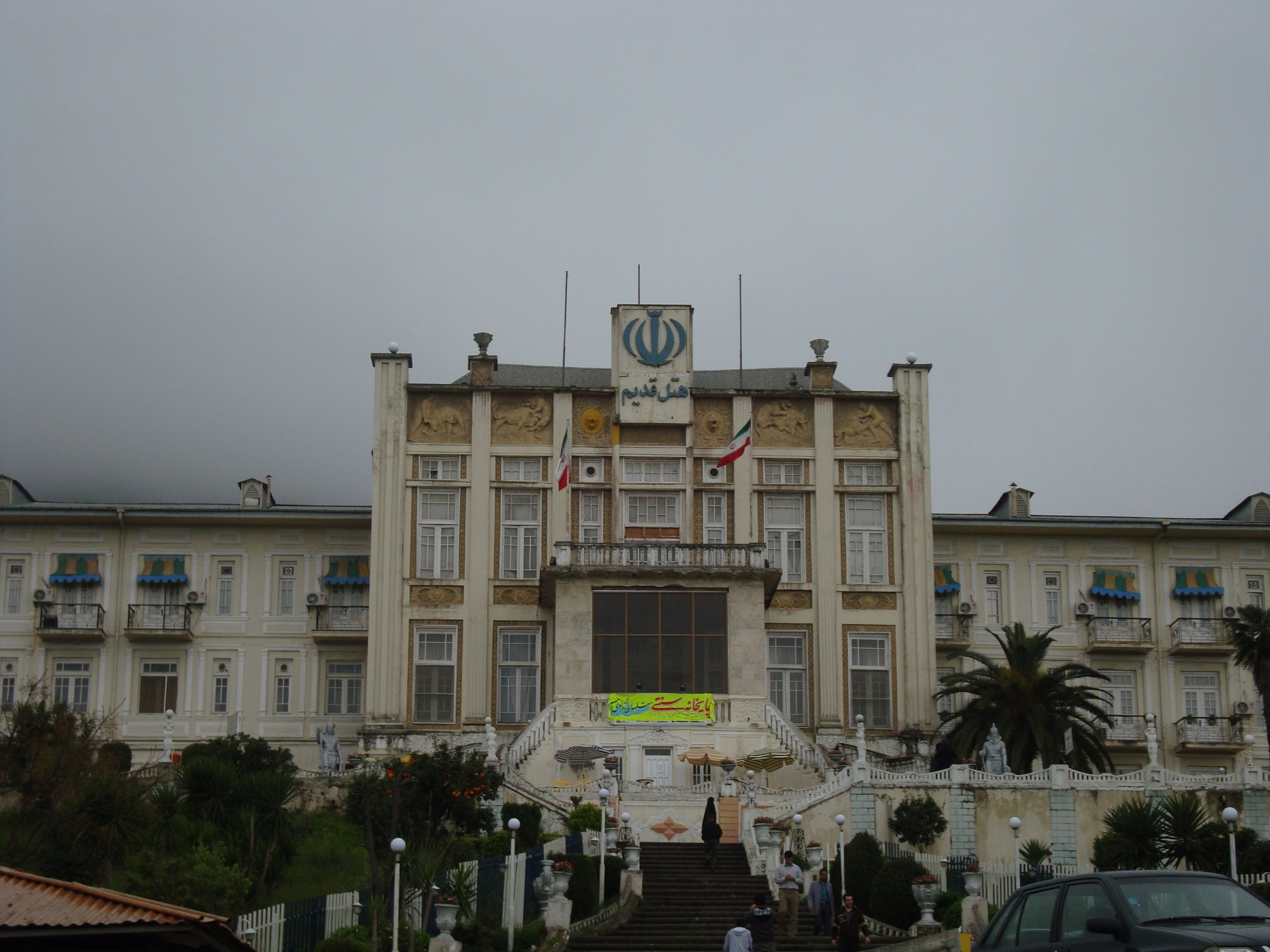
The Old Hotel Of Ramsar

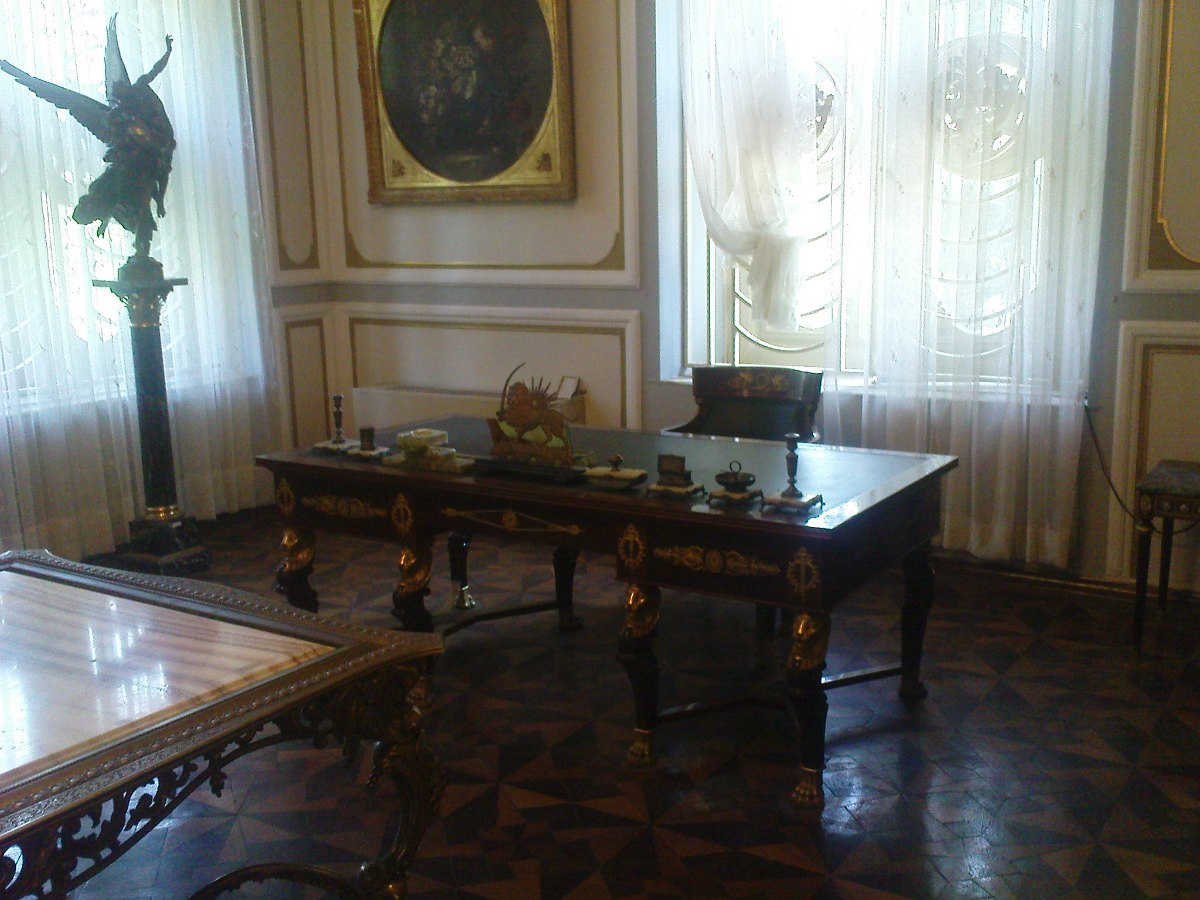
The desk of Mohammad Reza Shah

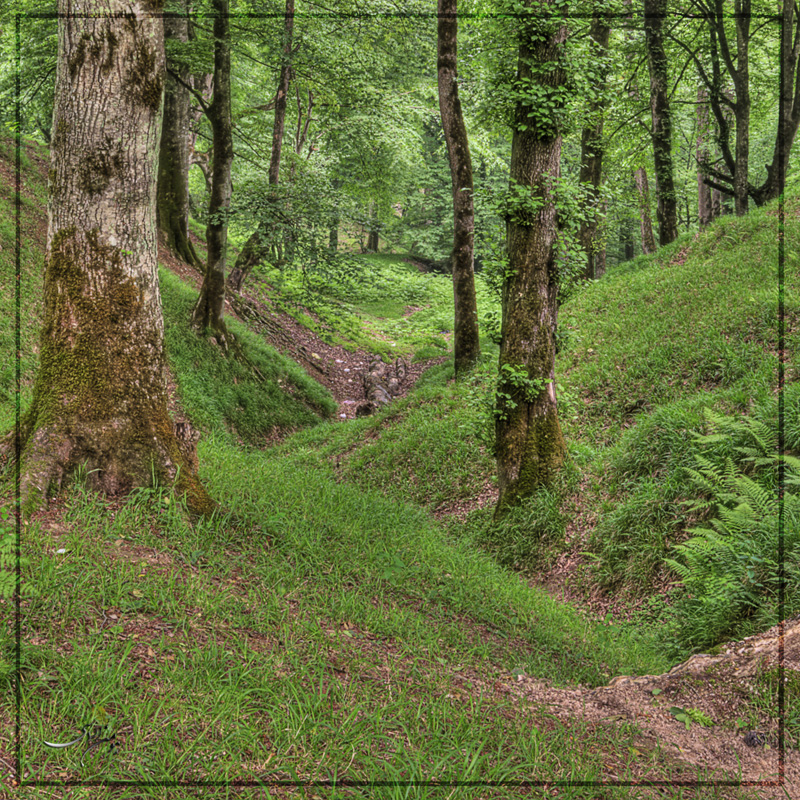
Dalikhani Forest

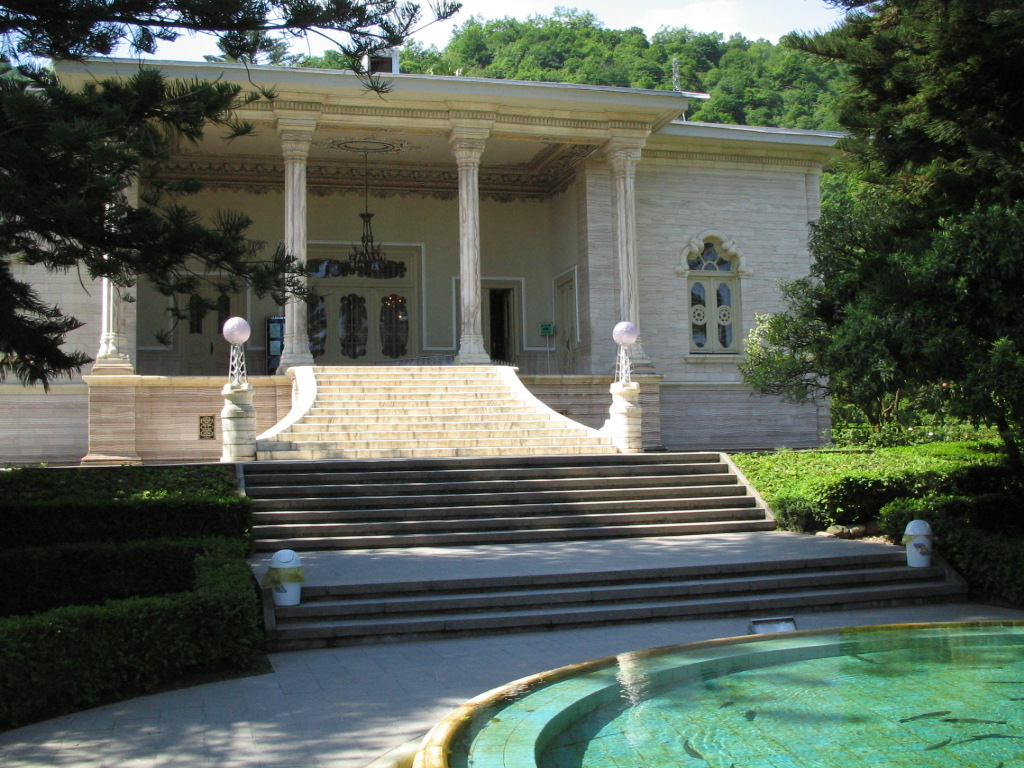
Marble palace in Ramsar

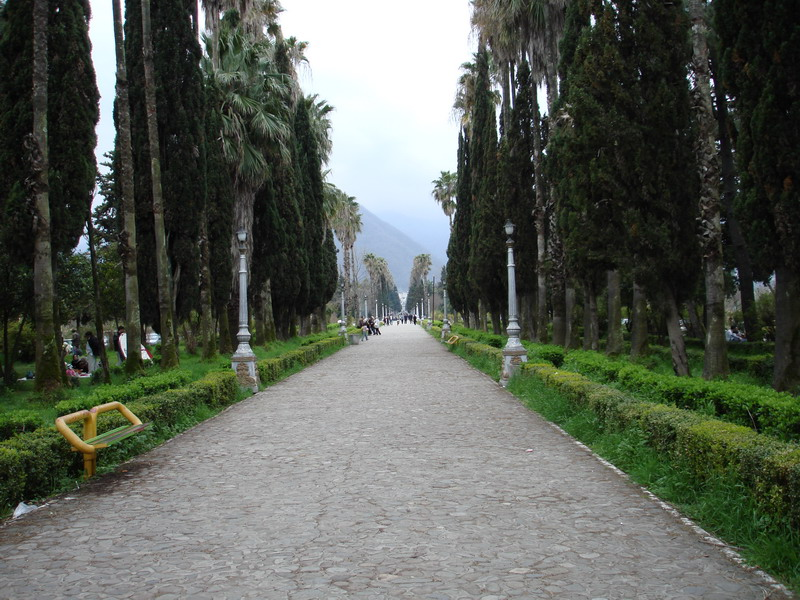
Ramsar Hotel

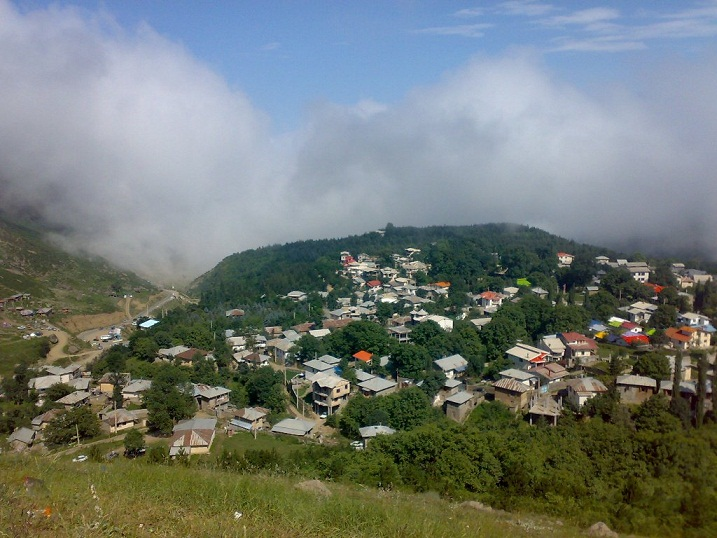
Javaher Deh

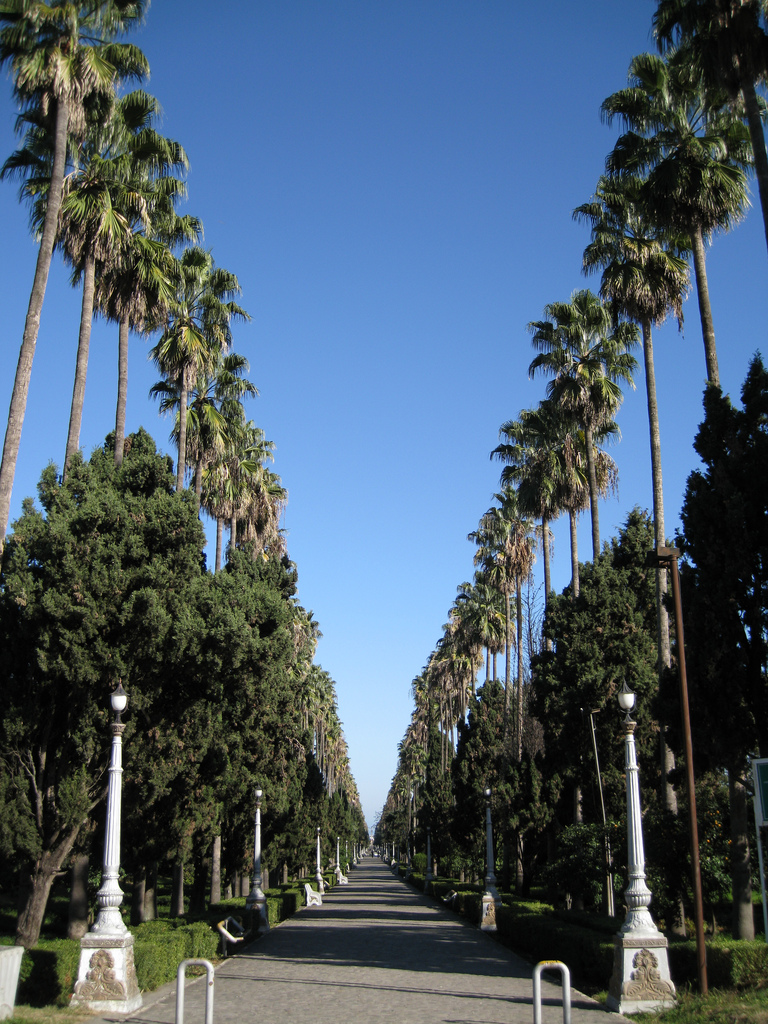
A walkway in front of the old hotel

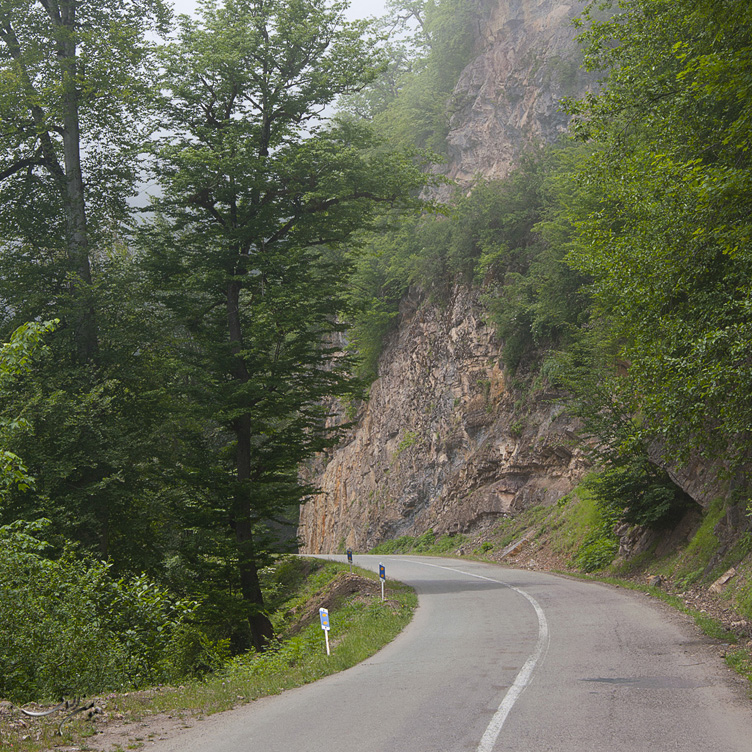
Dalikhani Forest

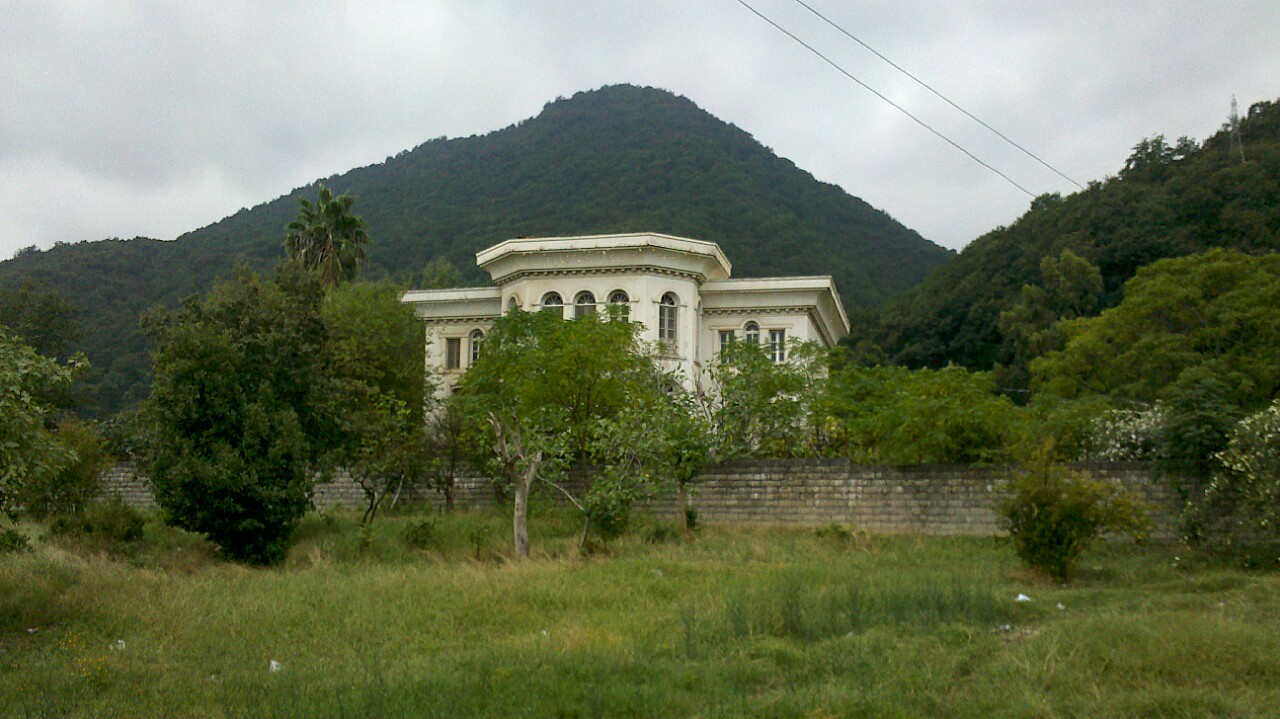
A palace in Ramsar

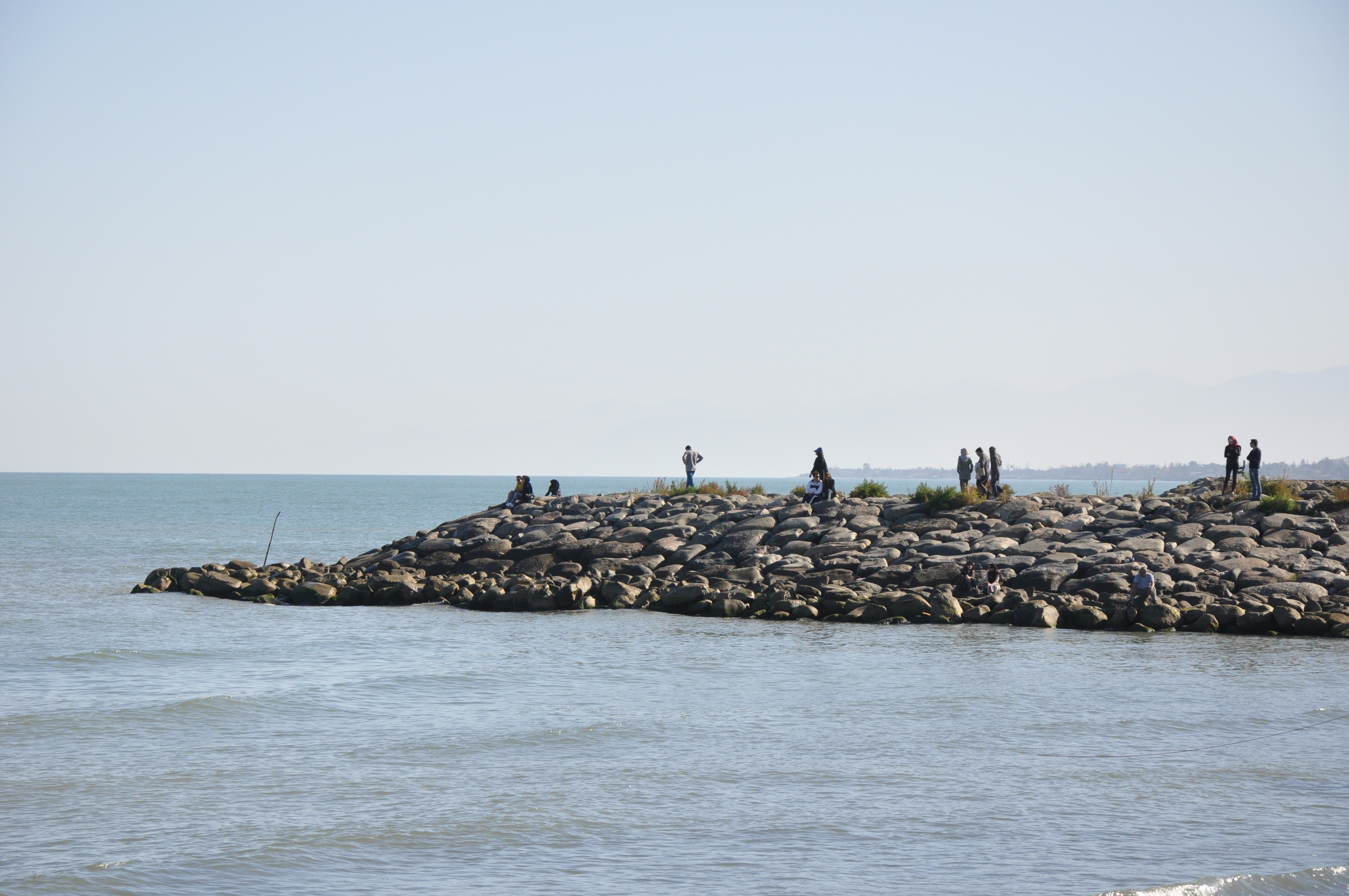
Ramsar Caspian coast

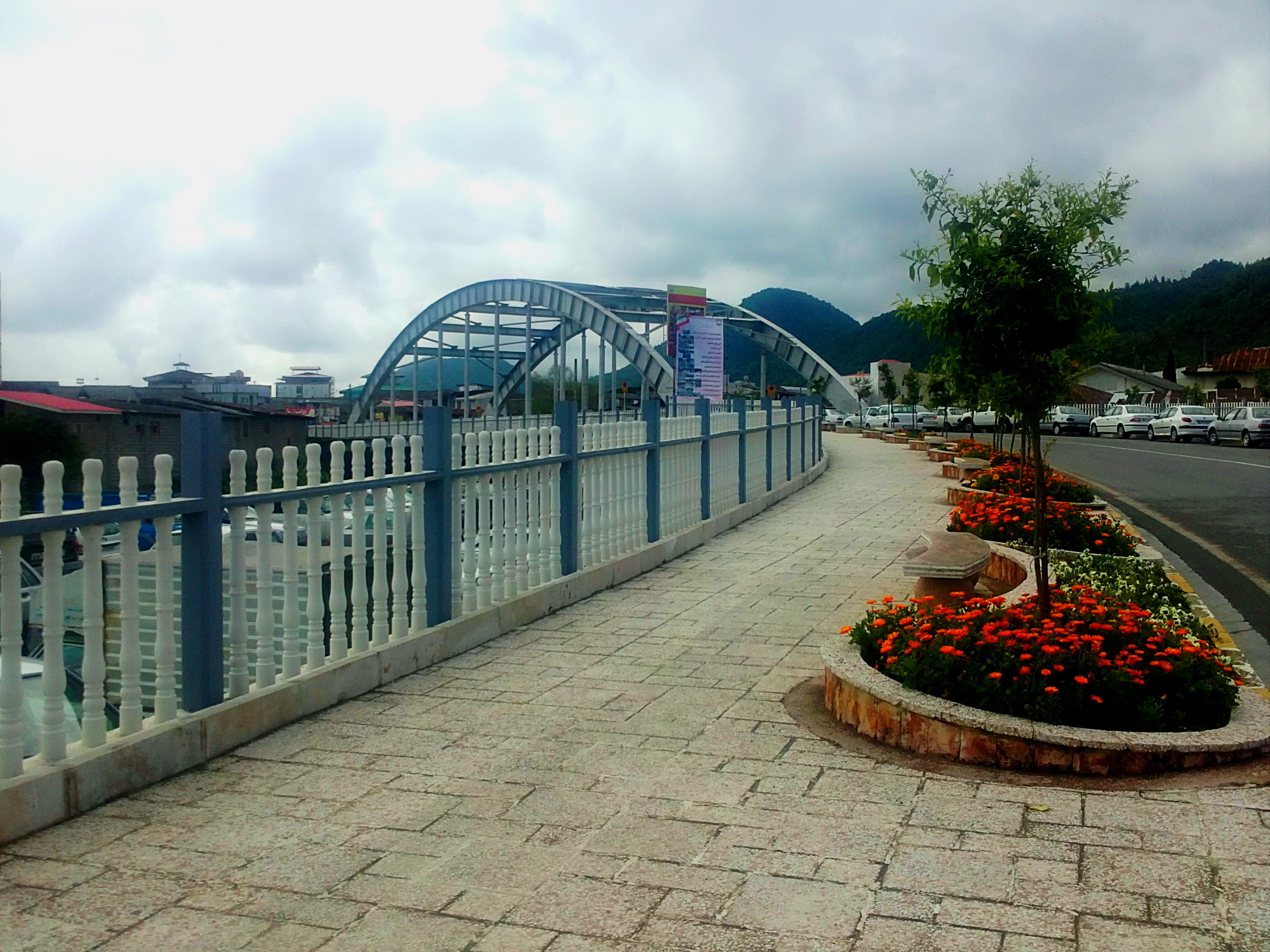
Ramsar Bridge

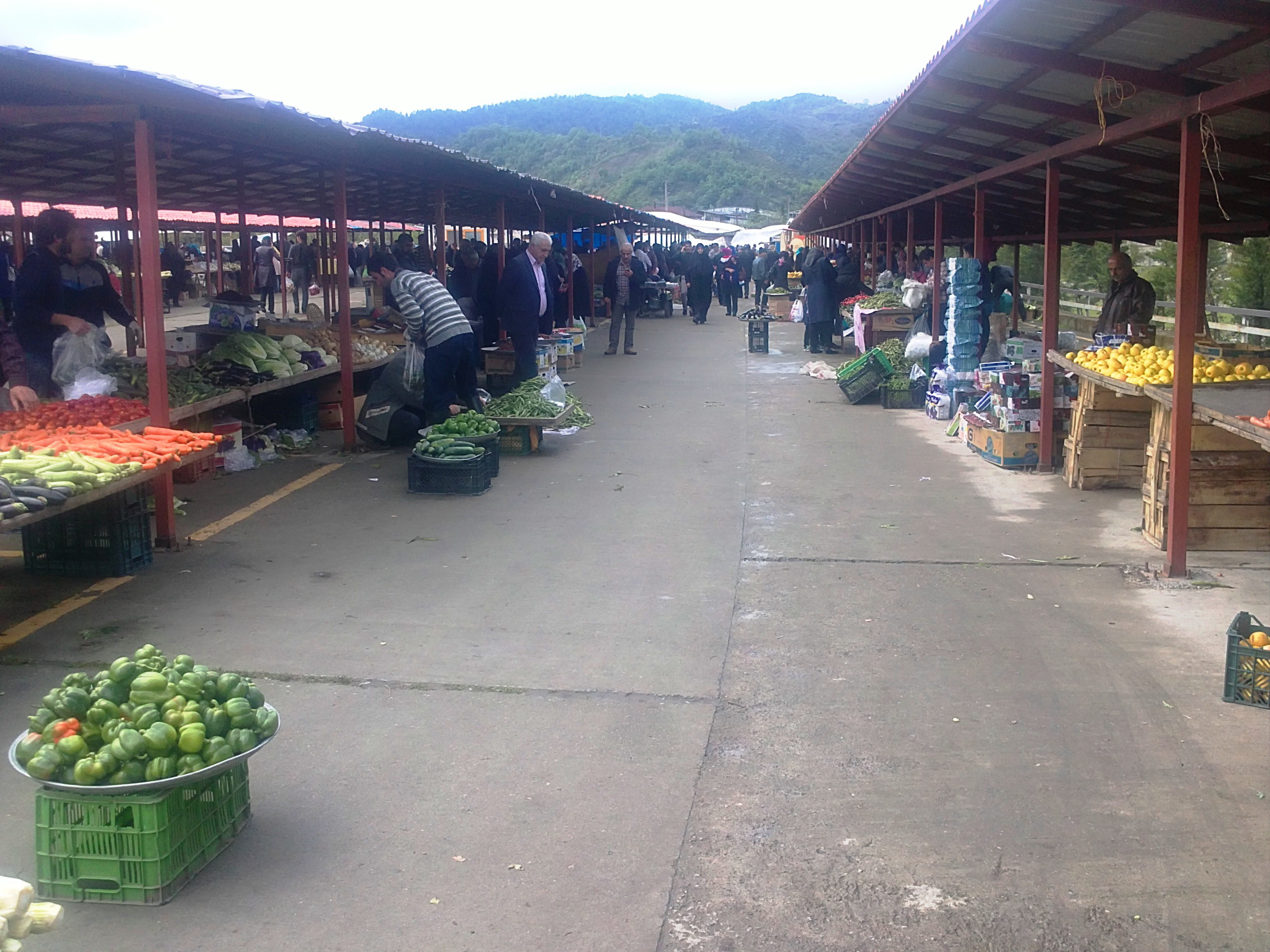
Ramsar Bazaar

Ramsar International Shopping

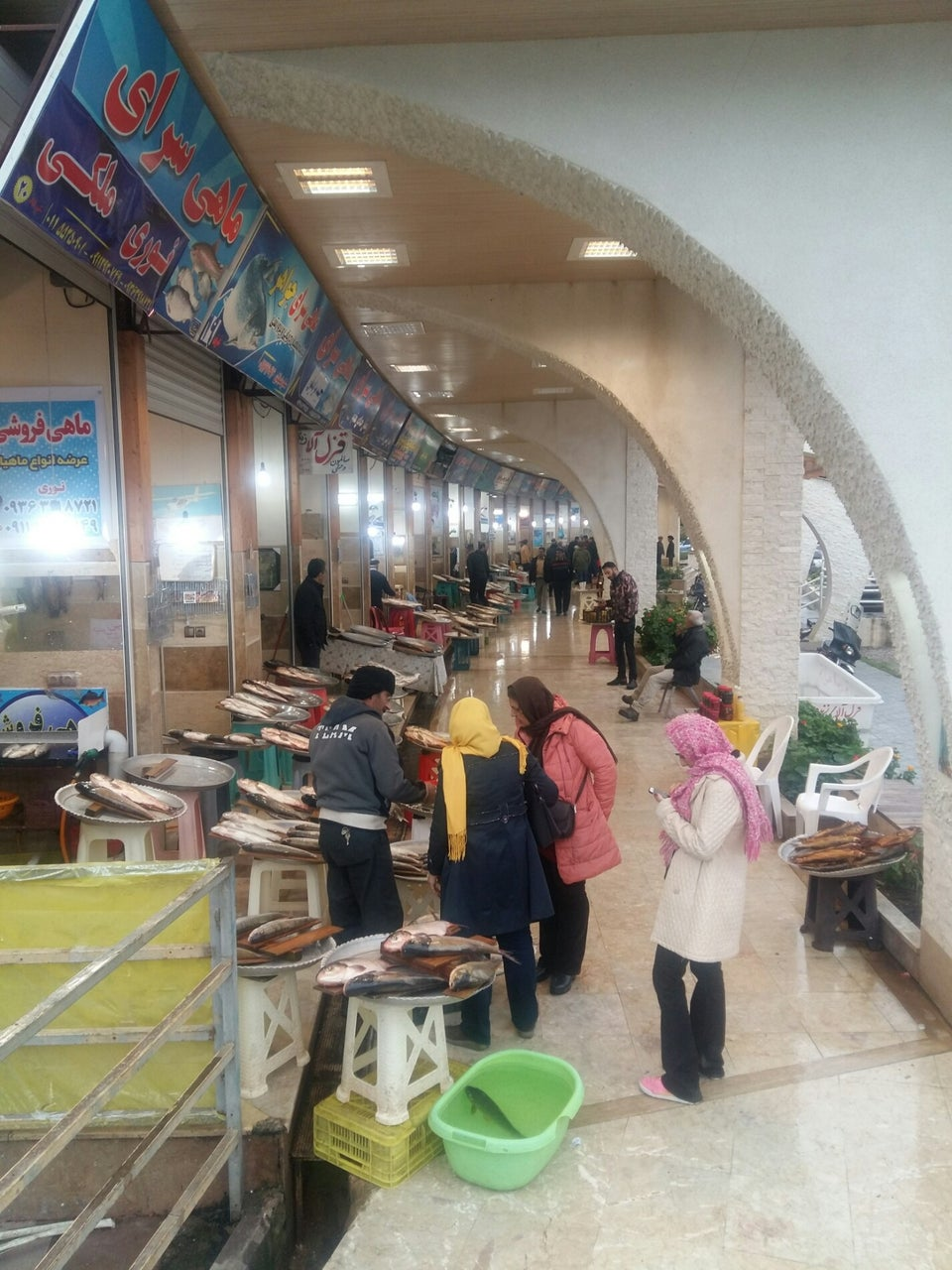
Ramsar Fish Market

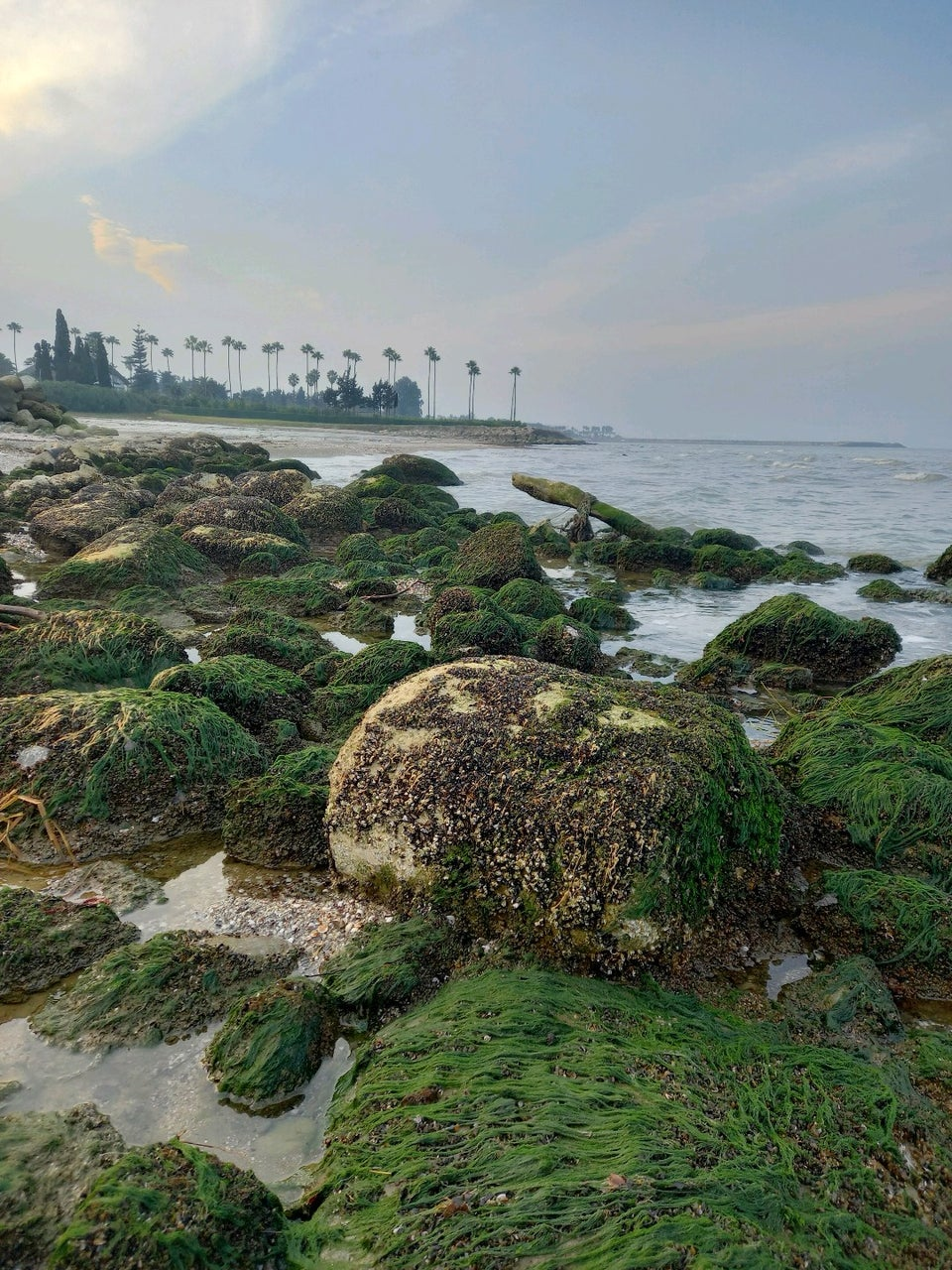
Ramsar seaside

== See also ==
- Rejuvenation (aging)
- Background radiation
- Banana equivalent dose
- History of Iran
- Tourism in Iran
- International rankings of Iran
- Chalus
