= Javaher Deh =

Village in Mazandaran Province, Iran

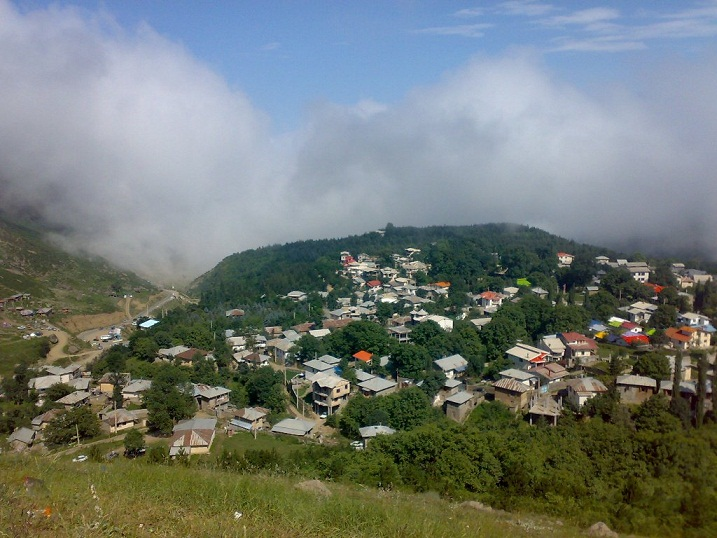
An image of Javaher Deh

Javaher Deh (Persian: جواهرده, also Romanized as Javāher Deh) is a village and tourist attraction in Sakht Sar Rural District, in the Central District of Ramsar County, Mazandaran province, Iran. At the 2006 census, its population was 170, in 76 households. In 2016 census, its population decreased to 29 people in 12 households.

The villagers are engaged in animal husbandry, agriculture and horticulture, and its handicrafts include felt-making, pottery, blacksmithing and coppersmithing. The only communication route of the jewel leads to Ramsar and is also connected to Qazvin through the mountains.

Today, the drinking water of the region is supplied from several springs such as "Suleiman", "Barshi" and "Kuh-e Kane".
