= Hossein Khalatbari =

Iranian fighter pilot

- Hossein Khalatbari in the 1980s
- Born: Hossein Khalatbari Mokarram; 4 October 1949; Baslkuh, Ramsar, Mazandaran, Imperial State of Iran
- Died: 21 March 1985 (aged 35) near Sanandaj, Kurdistan, Iran
- Burial place: Mirza Kuchak Khan Peak, Chehel Shahidan Martyrs Garden, Ramsar
- Spouse: Shahla Dolatshahi (m. 1979–1985)
- Military career
- Allegiance: Iran
- Branch: Ground Force (Note: Conscription); Air Force
- Service years: 1968–1970; 1972–1985
- Rank: Major
- Nicknames: "The Osa Hunter"; "Hossein the Maverick"
- Units: 92nd Armored Division; Bushehr Tactical Air Base 6; Hamedan Tactical Air Base 3; Dezful Tactical Air Base 4
- Conflicts: Iran–Iraq War †; Operation Kaman 99; Operation Morvarid; Operation H-3
- Awards: Fath Medal of Honor
- Website: khalabankhalatbari.ir

Hossein Khalatbari Mokarram (Persian: حسین خلعتبری; 4 October 1949 – 21 March 1985) was an Iranian fighter pilot who served in the Islamic Republic of Iran Air Force during Iran–Iraq War. He flew both D- and E-models of McDonnell Douglas F-4 Phantom II.

He has been described as a "legendary" and "distinguished patriotic" pilot who was a "respected commander". Khalatbari is praised for his anti-surface warfare and scrambling skills, and held the record of the most scramble flights in the Iranian Air Force until his death.

Khalatbari was awarded a Fath Medal of Honor and gained 17 months of seniority for his performance. He was posthumously promoted from major to major general.

== Early life and education ==
Khalatbari was born to a wealthy farmer family in Baslkuh, Ramsar. His maternal grandfather was Seyfollah Khan Hayati, a Mirza Kuchak Khan's companion in the Jungle Movement of Gilan, whom he was very proud of since his childhood. After studying his elementary education in Chalakrud, he moved to Tehran and gained a high school diploma. Khalatbari served his conscription in the 92nd Armored Division of Ground Forces of Imperial Iran Army with the rank of 3rd Sergeant. He became seriously interested in military aviation and decided to become a fighter pilot and joined the Imperial Iranian Air Force as an aviation student. From 1972 to 1974, he was trained as an F-4 Phantom pilot at the US Air Force's Sheppard Air Force Base in Texas.

== Iran–Iraq War ==
If even a piece of my country's soil is in contact with the boot of the enemy, I will wash it with my blood and I consider such a death to be an honor, and if I had something more valuable than my life to give to my people, I would give it.

— Hossein Khalatbari, his testament

Hours after Iraqi Invasion of Iran began, he became involved in the war. In the Operation Kaman 99, he was the leader of an 8-aircraft squadron tasked to attack Baghdad.

Khalatbari was Iran's military delegate in the International Court of Justice case United States Diplomatic and Consular Staff in Tehran. His mission was set to last for two months, however he returned to Iran after 15 days, stating "I cannot spend night and day in Switzerland, when the enemy's fighters do not leave my countrymen in peace."

After his return, together with pilots like Abbas Doran and Alireza Yasini, he played a key role in Operation Morvarid and virtually destroyed the Iraqi Navy in October and November 1981 mostly with AGM-65 Maverick missiles. During the war, he destroyed a total number of 23 warships, including minesweepers, frigates and Osa missile boats. Khalatbari was a well-trained certified Maverick shooter and top scorer and hence became known as "Hossein the Maverick" (حسین ماوریک). Also, for sinking several Iraqi Osa missile boats he was nicknamed "The Osa Hunter" (شکارچی اوزا) and "The Osa Killer" (قاتل اوزا).

In the H-3 airstrike, Khalatbari was among the top pilots and his maneuvers were decisive in damaging the Iraqi facility.

Fifty Iraqi high-ranking officers, including two generals, were killed in his airstrike operations. His other notable operations include bombing the Amarah bridge, the harbor of Umm Qasr, and the Kirkuk refinery.

=== Shot down ===
On March 21, 1985 (corresponding to Persian New Year's Eve, Nowruz of the year 1364 in the Iranian calendar), Khalatbari flew from Hamedan Air Base together with his co-pilot Issa Mohammadzadeh-Arousmahalle to confront three Iraqi aircraft with the code-name Solomon 31. While over Iran's Kurdistan Province, he was able to shoot down one of two MiG-23s with a missile. His aircraft then was hit with a R-40 missile shot from a MiG-25PD, flown by Mohommed Rayyan—a flying ace and the most successful Iraqi fighter pilot. Mohammadzadeh-Arousmahalle saved himself by ejecting, but Khalatbari could not.

== In popular culture ==
- Sky Swallowed the Sea (Persian: آسمان دریا را بلعید): The book is memoirs of Khalatbari collected by Rahim Makhdomi. Nashr-e-Shahed published this book in 1999.
- The 41st Squire (Persian: سلحشور چهل و یکم), book published by Avida Publications.
