= Deraz Zamin =

Village in Mazandaran province, Iran

Deraz Zamin Persian: دراز زمين
- Village
- Location within Iran
- Coordinates: 36°46′29″N 50°31′52″E
- Country: Iran
- Province: Mazandaran
- County: Ramsar
- District: Dalkhani
- Rural District: Jennat Rudbar

Population (2016)
  - Total: 0
- Time zone: UTC+3:30 (IRST)

Deraz Zamin (Persian: دراز زمين) (Note: Also romanized as Derāz Zamīn; also known as Derāz Zamīnak) is a village in Jennat Rudbar Rural District of Dalkhani District in Ramsar County, Mazandaran province, Iran.

== Demographics ==
=== Population ===
At the time of the 2006 National Census, the village's population was 18 in seven households, when it was in the Central District. The following census in 2011 counted a population below the reporting threshold. The 2016 census measured the population of the village as zero.

In 2019, the rural district was separated from the district in the formation of Dalkhani District.
