= Talesh Sara =

Talesh Sara طالش سرا
- Village
- Location within Iran
- Coordinates: 36°49′54″N 50°41′06″E
- Country: Iran
- Province: Mazandaran
- County: Ramsar
- Bakhsh: Central
- Rural District: Chehel Shahid

Population (2006)
  - Total: 130
- Time zone: UTC+3:30 (IRST)
  - Summer (DST): UTC+4:30 (IRDT)

Talesh Sara (Persian: طالش سرا, also Romanized as Ţālesh Sarā) is a village in Chehel Shahid Rural District, in the Central District of Ramsar County, Mazandaran Province, Iran. At the 2006 census, its population was 130, in 29 families.
