= Sormoshk =

Village in Mazandaran province, Iran

Sormoshk Persian: سرمشك
- Village
- Location within Iran
- Coordinates: 36°46′03″N 50°32′12″E
- Country: Iran
- Province: Mazandaran
- County: Ramsar
- District: Dalkhani
- Rural District: Jennat Rudbar

Population (2016)
  - Total: 29
- Time zone: UTC+3:30 (IRST)

Sormoshk (Persian: سرمشك) (Note: Also known as Sūrmeshk) is a village in Jennat Rudbar Rural District of Dalkhani District in Ramsar County, Mazandaran province, Iran.

== Demographics ==
=== Population ===
At the time of the 2006 National Census, the village's population was 40 in 13 households, when it was in the Central District. The following census in 2011 counted 21 people in 11 households. The 2016 census measured the population of the village as 29 people in 12 households.

In 2019, the rural district was separated from the district in the formation of Dalkhani District.
