= Solmel =

Salmal سلمل
- Village
- Location within Iran
- Coordinates: 36°51′22″N 50°29′39″E
- Country: Iran
- Province: Mazandaran
- County: Ramsar
- Bakhsh: Central
- Rural District: Sakht Sar

Population (2006)
  - Total: 11
- Time zone: UTC+3:30 (IRST)

Salmal (Persian: سلمل) is a village in Sakht Sar Rural District, in the Central District of Ramsar County, Mazandaran Province, Iran. At the 2016 census, its population was 7, in 4 families. Down from 11 in 2006.
