= Daq Langeh =

Daq Langeh داق لنگه
- Village
- Interactive map of Daq Langeh
- Coordinates: 36°55′56″N 50°36′32″E
- Country: Iran
- Province: Mazandaran
- County: Ramsar
- Bakhsh: Central
- Rural District: Sakht Sar

Population (2006)
  - Total: 15
- Time zone: UTC+3:30 (IRST)

Daq Langeh (Persian: داق لنگه, also Romanized as Dāq Langeh) is a village in Sakht Sar Rural District, in the Central District of Ramsar County, Mazandaran Province, Iran. At the 2006 census, its population was 15, in 5 families. The village had less than 3 households in 2016.
