= Namak Darreh =

Village in Mazandaran province, Iran

Namak Darreh Persian: نمكدره
- Village
- Location within Iran
- Coordinates: 36°47′42″N 50°29′33″E
- Country: Iran
- Province: Mazandaran
- County: Ramsar
- District: Dalkhani
- Rural District: Jennat Rudbar

Population (2016)
  - Total: 26
- Time zone: UTC+3:30 (IRST)

Namak Darreh (Persian: نمكدره) (Note: Also romanized as Namakdarreh) is a village in Jennat Rudbar Rural District of Dalkhani District in Ramsar County, Mazandaran province, Iran.

== Demographics ==
=== Population ===
At the time of the 2006 National Census, the village's population was 43 in 17 households, when it was in the Central District. The following census in 2011 counted 16 people in seven households. The 2016 census measured the population of the village as 26 people in 12 households.

In 2019, the rural district was separated from the district in the formation of Dalkhani District.
