= Gelin, Mazandaran =

Village in Mazandaran province, Iran

Gelin Persian: گلين
- Village
- Location within Iran
- Coordinates: 36°45′07″N 50°34′53″E
- Country: Iran
- Province: Mazandaran
- County: Ramsar
- District: Dalkhani
- Rural District: Jennat Rudbar

Population (2016)
  - Total: 53
- Time zone: UTC+3:30 (IRST)

Gelin (Persian: گلين) (Note: Also romanized as Galīn, Galyan, and Gelīn) is a village in Jennat Rudbar Rural District of Dalkhani District in Ramsar County, Mazandaran province, Iran.

== Demographics ==
=== Population ===
At the time of the 2006 National Census, the village's population was 45 in 21 households, when it was in the Central District. The following census in 2011 counted 179 people in 66 households. The 2016 census measured the population of the village as 53 people in 33 households.

In 2019, the rural district was separated from the district in the formation of Dalkhani District.
