= Kalayeh Bon =

Village in Mazandaran province, Iran

Kalayeh Bon Persian: كلايه بن
- Village
- Location within Iran
- Coordinates: 36°52′01″N 50°45′13″E
- Country: Iran
- Province: Mazandaran
- County: Ramsar
- District: Dalkhani
- Rural District: Chehel Shahid

Population (2016)
  - Total: 1,409
- Time zone: UTC+3:30 (IRST)

Kalayeh Bon (Persian: کلایه بن) (Note: Also romanized as Kalāyeh Bon (English: "Lowest point of the castle")) is a village in Chehel Shahid Rural District of Dalkhani District in Ramsar County, Mazandaran province, Iran.

== Demographics ==
=== Population ===
At the time of the 2006 National Census, the village's population was 1,017 in 288 households, when it was in the Central District. The following census in 2011 counted 1,352 people in 433 households. The 2016 census measured the population of the village as 1,409 people in 463 households, the most populous in its rural district.

In 2019, the rural district was separated from the district in the formation of Dalkhani District.
