= Dujeh Ganeh =

Dujeh Ganeh دوجه گنه
- Village
- Country: Iran
- Province: Mazandaran
- County: Ramsar
- Bakhsh: Central
- Rural District: Chehel Shahid

Population (2006)
  - Total: 39
- Time zone: UTC+3:30 (IRST)
  - Summer (DST): UTC+4:30 (IRDT)

Dujeh Ganeh (Persian: دوجه گنه, also Romanized as Dūjeh Ganeh) is a village in Chehel Shahid Rural District, in the Central District of Ramsar County, Mazandaran Province, Iran. At the 2006 census, its population was 39, in 11 families.
