= Aghuz Koti, Ramsar =

Village in Mazandaran province, Iran

Aghuz Koti Persian: اغوزكتي
- Village
- Location within Iran
- Coordinates: 36°44′12″N 50°34′55″E
- Country: Iran
- Province: Mazandaran
- County: Ramsar
- District: Dalkhani
- Rural District: Jennat Rudbar

Population (2016)
  - Total: 41
- Time zone: UTC+3:30 (IRST)

Aghuz Koti (Persian: اغوزكتي) (Note: Also romanized as Āghūz Kotī and Āghūzkatī; also known as Āghūzkī-ye Bālā) is a village in Jennat Rudbar Rural District of Dalkhani District in Ramsar County, Mazandaran province, Iran.

== Demographics ==
=== Population ===
At the time of the 2006 National Census, the village's population was 21 in eight households, when it was in the Central District. The following census in 2011 counted 104 people in 28 households. The 2016 census measured the population of the village as 41 people in 20 households.

In 2019, the rural district was separated from the district in the formation of Dalkhani District.
