= Latarnesa =

Latarnesa لترنسا
- Village
- Location within Iran
- Coordinates: 36°50′09″N 50°42′41″E
- Country: Iran
- Province: Mazandaran
- County: Ramsar
- Bakhsh: Central
- Rural District: Chehel Shahid

Population (2006)
  - Total: 69
- Time zone: UTC+3:30 (IRST)
  - Summer (DST): UTC+4:30 (IRDT)

Latarnesa (Persian: لترنسا, also Romanized as Latarnesā) is a village in Chehel Shahid Rural District, in the Central District of Ramsar County, Mazandaran Province, Iran. At the 2006 census, its population was 69, in 17 families.
