= Asel Poshteh =

Asel Poshteh عسل پشته
- Village
- Interactive map of Asel Poshteh
- Coordinates: 36.873°N 50.66°E
- Country: Iran
- Province: Mazandaran
- County: Ramsar
- Bakhsh: Central
- Rural District: Sakht Sar

Population (2006)
  - Total: 41
- Time zone: UTC+3:30 (IRST)

Asel Poshteh (Persian: عسل پشته, also Romanized as ʿAsel Poshteh) is a village in Sakht Sar Rural District, in the Central District of Ramsar County, Mazandaran Province, Iran. At the 2006 census, its population was 41, in 10 families. The village had less than 4 households in 2016.
