= Latar =

Village in Mazandaran province, Iran

Latar Persian: لتر
- Village
- Location within Iran
- Coordinates: 36°49′32″N 50°42′53″E
- Country: Iran
- Province: Mazandaran
- County: Ramsar
- District: Dalkhani
- Rural District: Chehel Shahid

Population (2016)
  - Total: 394
- Time zone: UTC+3:30 (IRST)

Latar (Persian: لتر) is a village in Chehel Shahid Rural District of Dalkhani District in Ramsar County, Mazandaran province, Iran.

== Population ==
At the time of the 2006 National Census, the village's population was 445 in 128 households, when it was in the Central District. The following census in 2011 counted 214 people in 75 households. The 2016 census measured the population of the village as 394 people in 129 households.

In 2019, the rural district was separated from the district in the formation of Dalkhani District.
