= Shasta, Iran =

Village in Mazandaran province, Iran

Shasta Persian: شستا
- Village
- Location within Iran
- Coordinates: 36°50′50″N 50°44′49″E
- Country: Iran
- Province: Mazandaran
- County: Ramsar
- District: Dalkhani
- Rural District: Chehel Shahid

Population (2016)
  - Total: 564
- Time zone: UTC+3:30 (IRST)

Shasta (Persian: شستا) (Note: Also romanized as Shastā) is a village in Chehel Shahid Rural District of Dalkhani District in Ramsar County, Mazandaran province, Iran.

== Population ==
At the time of the 2006 National Census, the village's population was 591 in 172 households, when it was in the Central District. The following census in 2011 counted 561 people in 183 households. The 2016 census measured the population of the village as 564 people in 192 households.

In 2019, the rural district was separated from the district in the formation of Dalkhani District.
