= Guhar Sara =

Guhar Sara گوهرسرا
- Village
- Interactive map of Guhar Sara
- Coordinates: 36°57′04″N 50°34′56″E
- Country: Iran
- Province: Mazandaran
- County: Ramsar
- Bakhsh: Central
- Rural District: Sakht Sar

Population (2006)
  - Total: 116
- Time zone: UTC+3:30 (IRST)

Guhar Sara (Persian: گوهرسرا, also Romanized as Gūhar Sarā) is a village in Sakht Sar Rural District, in the Central District of Ramsar County, Mazandaran Province, Iran. At the 2016 census, its population was 87, in 29 families. Down from 116 in 2006.
