= Mazulangeh =

Mazulangeh مازولنگه
- Village
- Location within Iran
- Coordinates: 36°54′13″N 50°37′39″E
- Country: Iran
- Province: Mazandaran
- County: Ramsar
- Bakhsh: Central
- Rural District: Sakht Sar

Population (2006)
  - Total: 66
- Time zone: UTC+3:30 (IRST)

Mazulangeh (Persian: مازولنگه, also Romanized as Māzūlangeh) is a village in Sakht Sar Rural District, in the Central District of Ramsar County, Mazandaran Province, Iran. At the 2016 census, its population was 44, in 15 families. Down from 66 in 2006.
