= Limakesh =

Limakesh ليماكش
- Village
- Location within Iran
- Coordinates: 36°53′20″N 50°38′23″E
- Country: Iran
- Province: Mazandaran
- County: Ramsar
- Bakhsh: Central
- Rural District: Sakht Sar

Population (2006)
  - Total: 86
- Time zone: UTC+3:30 (IRST)

Limakesh (Persian: ليماكش, also Romanized as Līmākesh; also known as Lamākesh) is a village in Sakht Sar Rural District, in the Central District of Ramsar County, Mazandaran Province, Iran. At the 2016 census, its population was 77, in 23 families. Down from 86 in 2006.
