= Asiab Sar, Ramsar =

Village in Mazandaran province, Iran

Asiab Sar Persian: آسیاب‌سر
- Village
- Location within Iran
- Coordinates: 36°50′34″N 50°44′05″E
- Country: Iran
- Province: Mazandaran
- County: Ramsar
- District: Dalkhani
- Rural District: Chehel Shahid

Population (2016)
  - Total: 610
- Time zone: UTC+3:30 (IRST)

Asiab Sar (Persian: آسیاب‌سر) (Note: Also romanized as Āsīāb Sar) is a village in Chehel Shahid Rural District of Dalkhani District in Ramsar County, Mazandaran province, Iran.

== Population ==
At the time of the 2006 National Census, the village's population was 500 in 145 households, when it was in the Central District. The following census in 2011 counted 534 people in 164 households. The 2016 census measured the population of the village as 610 people in 196 households.

In 2019, the rural district was separated from the district in the formation of Dalkhani District.
