= Laj =

Laj or Loj (Persian: لج or لاج) may refer to:

- Ləj, Azerbaijan
- Loj, Mazandaran (لج - Loj)
- Laj, Razavi Khorasan (لاج - Lāj)
- Laj, West Azerbaijan (لج - Laj)
- Loj Island, Erikub Atoll, Marshall Islands

== See also ==
- LAJ (disambiguation)
