= Kang Sar =

Kang Sar كانگ سر
- Village
- Country: Iran
- Province: Mazandaran
- County: Ramsar
- Bakhsh: Central
- Rural District: Chehel Shahid

Population (2006)
  - Total: 398
- Time zone: UTC+3:30 (IRST)
  - Summer (DST): UTC+4:30 (IRDT)

Kang Sar (Persian: كانگ سر, also Romanized as Kāng Sar) is a village in Chehel Shahid Rural District, in the Central District of Ramsar County, Mazandaran Province, Iran. At the 2006 census, its population was 398, in 108 families.
