= Jennat Rudbar =

Village in Mazandaran province, Iran

Jennat Rudbar Persian: جنت رودبار
- Village
- Location within Iran
- Coordinates: 36°47′05″N 50°30′07″E
- Country: Iran
- Province: Mazandaran
- County: Ramsar
- District: Dalkhani
- Rural District: Jennat Rudbar

Population (2016)
  - Total: 174
- Time zone: UTC+3:30 (IRST)

Jennat Rudbar (Persian: جنت رودبار) (Note: Also romanized as Jennat Rūdbār) is a village in, and the capital of, Jennat Rudbar Rural District in Dalkhani District of Ramsar County, Mazandaran province, Iran.

== Demographics ==
=== Population ===
At the time of the 2006 National Census, the village's population was 191 in 77 households, when it was in the Central District. The following census in 2011 counted 130 people in 62 households. The 2016 census measured the population of the village as 174 people in 77 households. It was the most populous village in its rural district.

In 2019, the rural district was separated from the district in the formation of Dalkhani District.
