= Zaru Sara =

Village in Mazandaran province, Iran

Zaru Sara Persian: زروسرا
- Village
- Location within Iran
- Coordinates: 36°47′20″N 50°28′28″E
- Country: Iran
- Province: Mazandaran
- County: Ramsar
- District: Dalkhani
- Rural District: Jennat Rudbar

Population (2016)
  - Total: 0
- Time zone: UTC+3:30 (IRST)

Zaru Sara (Persian: زروسرا) (Note: Also romanized as Zarū Sarā; also known as Zarūd Sarā) is a village in Jennat Rudbar Rural District of Dalkhani District in Ramsar County, Mazandaran province, Iran.

== Demographics ==
=== Population ===
At the time of the 2006 National Census, the village's population was 15 in seven households, when it was in the Central District. The following census in 2011 counted 13 people in four households. The 2016 census measured the population of the village as zero.

In 2019, the rural district was separated from the district in the formation of Dalkhani District.
