= Disar =

Disar ديسر
- Village
- Location within Iran
- Coordinates: 36°55′01″N 50°36′41″E
- Country: Iran
- Province: Mazandaran
- County: Ramsar
- Bakhsh: Central
- Rural District: Sakht Sar

Population (2006)
  - Total: 115
- Time zone: UTC+3:30 (IRST)

Disar (Persian: ديسر, also Romanized as Dīsar) is a village in Sakht Sar Rural District, in the Central District of Ramsar County, Mazandaran Province, Iran. At the 2016 census, its population was 80, in 31 families. Down from 115 in 2006.
