= Rajub =

Village in Mazandaran province, Iran

Rajub Persian: راجوبسر
- Village
- Location within Iran
- Coordinates: 36°50′37″N 50°44′26″E
- Country: Iran
- Province: Mazandaran
- County: Ramsar
- District: Dalkhani
- Rural District: Chehel Shahid

Population (2016)
  - Total: 703
- Time zone: UTC+3:30 (IRST)

Rajub (Persian: راجوب) (Note: Also romanized as Rājūb; also known as Rājū) is a village in Chehel Shahid Rural District of Dalkhani District in Ramsar County, Mazandaran province, Iran.

== Population ==
At the time of the 2006 National Census, the village's population was 602 in 171 households, when it was in the Central District. The following census in 2011 counted 658 people in 204 households. The 2016 census measured the population of the village as 703 people in 237 households.

In 2019, the rural district was separated from the district in the formation of Dalkhani District.
