= Darreh Dom =

Village in Mazandaran province, Iran

Darreh Dom Persian: دره دم
- Village
- Location within Iran
- Coordinates: 36°47′13″N 50°31′11″E
- Country: Iran
- Province: Mazandaran
- County: Ramsar
- District: Dalkhani
- Rural District: Jennat Rudbar

Population (2016)
  - Total: 24
- Time zone: UTC+3:30 (IRST)

Darreh Dom (Persian: دره دم) is a village in Jennat Rudbar Rural District of Dalkhani District in Ramsar County, Mazandaran province, Iran.

== Demographics ==
=== Population ===
At the time of the 2006 National Census, the village's population was 20 in six households, when it was in the Central District. The following census in 2011 counted 21 people in six households. The 2016 census measured the population of the village as 24 people in eight households.

In 2019, the rural district was separated from the district in the formation of Dalkhani District.
