= Dom Sara =

Dom Sara دم سرا
- Village
- Location within Iran
- Coordinates: 36°50′23″N 50°35′58″E
- Country: Iran
- Province: Mazandaran
- County: Ramsar
- Bakhsh: Central
- Rural District: Sakht Sar

Population (2006)
  - Total: 34
- Time zone: UTC+3:30 (IRST)

Dom Sara (Persian: دم سرا, also Romanized as Dom Sarā) is a village in Sakht Sar Rural District, in the Central District of Ramsar County, Mazandaran Province, Iran. At the 2006 census, its population was 34, in 9 families. The village had no permanent population in 2016.
