= Mahar Mijeh =

Mahar Mijeh مهرميجه
- Village
- Interactive map of Mahar Mijeh
- Coordinates: 36.8715°N 50.651°E
- Country: Iran
- Province: Mazandaran
- County: Ramsar
- Bakhsh: Central
- Rural District: Sakht Sar

Population (2006)
  - Total: 24
- Time zone: UTC+3:30 (IRST)

Mahar Mijeh (Persian: مهرميجه, also Romanized as Mahar Mījeh) is a village in Sakht Sar Rural District, in the Central District of Ramsar County, Mazandaran Province, Iran. At the 2016 census, its population was 19, in 7 families. Down from 24 in 2006.
