= Izki, Iran =

Village in Mazandaran province, Iran

Izki Persian: ايزكي
- Village
- Location within Iran
- Coordinates: 36°47′28″N 50°33′19″E
- Country: Iran
- Province: Mazandaran
- County: Ramsar
- District: Dalkhani
- Rural District: Jennat Rudbar

Population (2016)
  - Total: Below reporting threshold
- Time zone: UTC+3:30 (IRST)

Izki (Persian: ايزكي) (Note: Also romanized as Īzkī) is a village in Jennat Rudbar Rural District of Dalkhani District in Ramsar County, Mazandaran province, Iran.

== Demographics ==
=== Population ===
At the time of the 2006 National Census, the village's population was 22 in 10 households, when it was in the Central District. The following census in 2011 counted 11 people in four households. The 2016 census measured the population of the village as below the reporting threshold.

In 2019, the rural district was separated from the district in the formation of Dalkhani District.
