= Asalam Dasht =

Asalam Dasht اسالم دشت
- Village
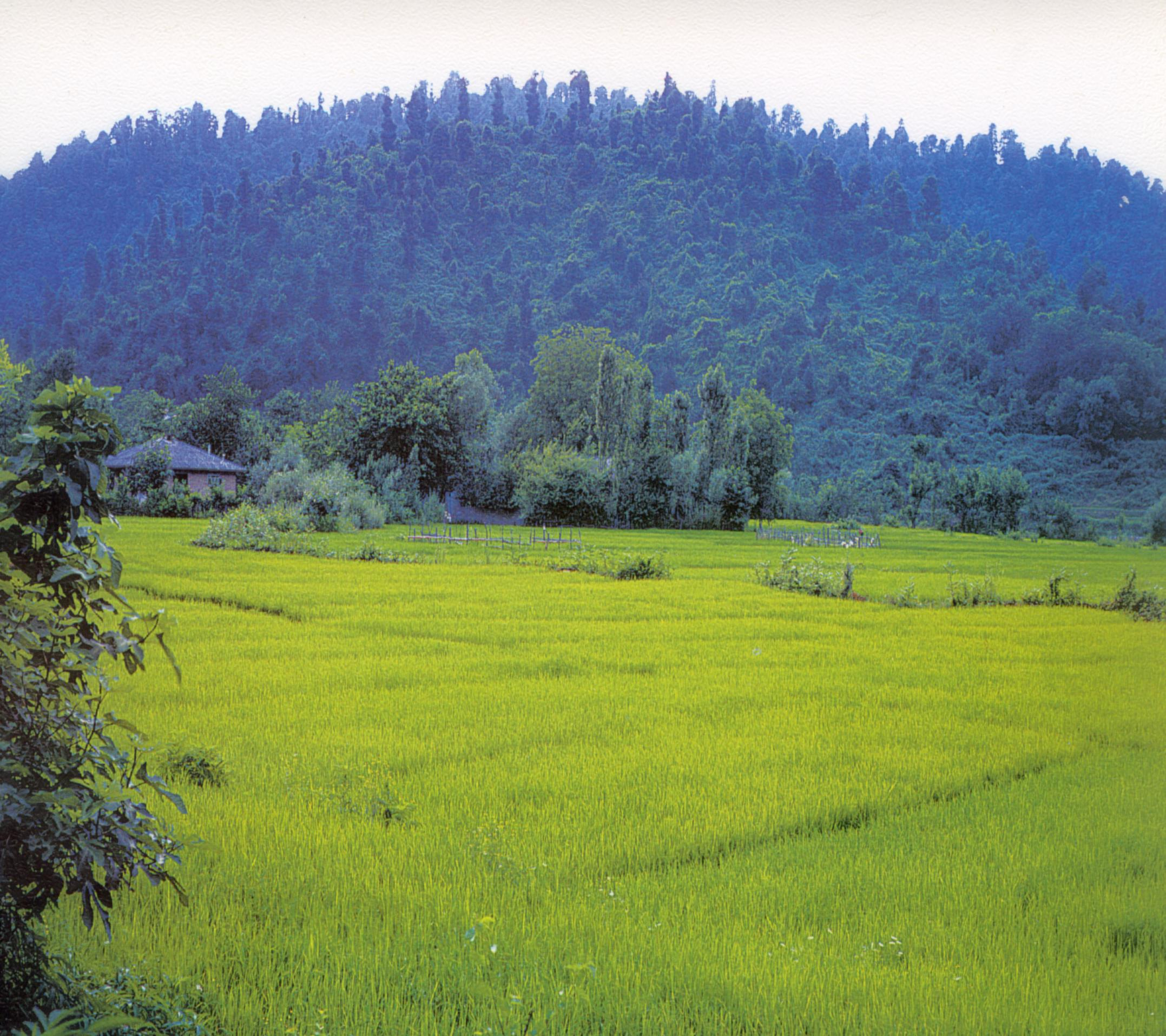
- Asaalem Village Landscape, Mazandaran, Iran.
- Country: Iran
- Province: Mazandaran
- County: Ramsar
- Bakhsh: Central
- Rural District: Sakht Sar

Population (2006)
  - Total: 24
- Time zone: UTC+3:30 (IRST)

Asalam Dasht (Persian: اسالم دشت, also romanized as Asālam Dasht) is a village in Sakht Sar Rural District, in the Central District of Ramsar County, Mazandaran Province, Iran. At the 2016 census, its population was 21, in 10 families. Down from 24 in 2006.
