= Kalak, Ramsar =

Kalak کلک
- Village
- Location within Iran
- Coordinates: 36°53′58″N 50°38′39″E
- Country: Iran
- Province: Mazandaran
- County: Ramsar
- Bakhsh: Central
- Rural District: Sakht Sar

Population (2006)
  - Total: 32
- Time zone: UTC+3:30 (IRST)

Kalak (Persian: کلک) is a village in Sakht Sar Rural District, in the Central District of Ramsar County, Mazandaran Province, Iran. At the 2016 census, its population was 16, in 5 families. Down from 32 in 2006.
