= Bamasi =

Bamasi بامسی
- Village
- Location within Iran
- Coordinates: 36°53′54″N 50°35′47″E
- Country: Iran
- Province: Mazandaran
- County: Ramsar
- Bakhsh: Central
- Rural District: Sakht Sar

Population (2006)
  - Total: 105
- Time zone: UTC+3:30 (IRST)

Bamasi (Persian: بامسی, also Romanized as Bāmasī) is a village in Sakht Sar Rural District, in the Central District of Ramsar County, Mazandaran Province, Iran. At the 2016 census, its population was 79, in 23 families. Down from 105 people in 2006.
