= Sedeh, Mazandaran =

Village in Mazandaran province, Iran

Sedeh Persian: سده
- Village
- Location within Iran
- Coordinates: 36°47′16″N 50°30′11″E
- Country: Iran
- Province: Mazandaran
- County: Ramsar
- District: Dalkhani
- Rural District: Jennat Rudbar

Population (2016)
  - Total: 22
- Time zone: UTC+3:30 (IRST)

Sedeh (Persian: سده (Note: Also romanized as Sadeh) is a village in Jennat Rudbar Rural District of Dalkhani District in Ramsar County, Mazandaran province, Iran.

== Demographics ==
=== Population ===
At the time of the 2006 National Census, the village's population was 11 in five households, when it was in the Central District. The following census in 2011 counted 41 people in 14 households. The 2016 census measured the population of the village as 22 people in 13 households.

In 2019, the rural district was separated from the district in the formation of Dalkhani District.
