= Rashulangeh =

Rashulangeh رشولنگه
- Village
- Country: Iran
- Province: Mazandaran
- County: Ramsar
- Bakhsh: Central
- Rural District: Sakht Sar

Population (2016)
  - Total: 23
- Time zone: UTC+3:30 (IRST)

Rashulangeh (Persian: رشولنگه, also Romanized as Rashūlangeh and Rashū Langeh) is a village in Sakht Sar Rural District, in the Central District of Ramsar County, Mazandaran Province, Iran. At the 2016 census, its population was 23, in 6 families. Up from 15 in 2006.
