= Armu, Mazandaran =

Village in Mazandaran province, Iran

Armu Persian: آرمو
- Village
- Location within Iran
- Coordinates: 36°44′39″N 50°32′46″E
- Country: Iran
- Province: Mazandaran
- County: Ramsar
- District: Dalkhani
- Rural District: Jennat Rudbar

Population (2016)
  - Total: Below reporting threshold
- Time zone: UTC+3:30 (IRST)

Armu (Persian: آرمو) (Note: Also romanized as Ārmū) is a village in Jennat Rudbar Rural District of Dalkhani District in Ramsar County, Mazandaran province, Iran.

== Demographics ==
=== Population ===
At the time of the 2006 National Census, the village's population was 10 in six households, when it was in the Central District. The following census in 2011 counted 25 people in seven households. The 2016 census measured the population of the village as below the reporting threshold.

In 2019, the rural district was separated from the district in the formation of Dalkhani District.
