= Ranga Poshteh =

Ranga Poshteh رنگاپشته
- Village
- Location within Iran
- Coordinates: 36°55′32″N 50°36′49″E
- Country: Iran
- Province: Mazandaran
- County: Ramsar
- Bakhsh: Central
- Rural District: Sakht Sar

Population (2006)
  - Total: 43
- Time zone: UTC+3:30 (IRST)

Ranga Poshteh (Persian: رنگاپشته, also Romanized as Rangā Poshteh; also known as Rangeh Poshteh) is a village in Sakht Sar Rural District, in the Central District of Ramsar County, Mazandaran Province, Iran. At the 2016 census, its population was 39, in 19 families. Down from 43 in 2006.
