= Azarchal =

Azarchal ازارچال
- Village
- Location within Iran
- Coordinates: 36°43′54″N 50°35′28″E
- Country: Iran
- Province: Mazandaran
- County: Ramsar
- Bakhsh: Central
- Rural District: Chehel Shahid

Population (2006)
  - Total: 117
- Time zone: UTC+3:30 (IRST)
  - Summer (DST): UTC+4:30 (IRDT)

Azarchal (Persian: ازارچال, also Romanized as Āzārchāl) is a village in Chehel Shahid Rural District, in the Central District of Ramsar County, Mazandaran Province, Iran. At the 2006 census, its population was 117, in 34 families.
