= Kord Kheyl, Ramsar =

Village in Mazandaran province, Iran

Kord Kheyl Persian: كردخيل
- Village
- Location within Iran
- Coordinates: 36°47′37″N 50°32′32″E
- Country: Iran
- Province: Mazandaran
- County: Ramsar
- District: Dalkhani
- Rural District: Jennat Rudbar

Population (2016)
  - Total: 0
- Time zone: UTC+3:30 (IRST)

Kord Kheyl (Persian: كردخيل) (Note: Also romanized as Kord Khīl) is a village in Jennat Rudbar Rural District of Dalkhani District in Ramsar County, Mazandaran province, Iran.

== Demographics ==
=== Population ===
At the time of the 2006 National Census, the village's population was 16 in five households, when it was in the Central District. The following census in 2011 counted eight people in four households. The 2016 census measured the population of the village as zero.

In 2019, the rural district was separated from the district in the formation of Dalkhani District.
