= Valsialam =

Valsialam ولسيالم
- Village
- Interactive map of Valsialam
- Coordinates: 36.923°N 50.622°E
- Country: Iran
- Province: Mazandaran
- County: Ramsar
- Bakhsh: Central
- Rural District: Sakht Sar

Population (2006)
  - Total: 65
- Time zone: UTC+3:30 (IRST)

Valsialam (Persian: ولسيالم, also Romanized as Valsīālam) is a village in Sakht Sar Rural District, in the Central District of Ramsar County, Mazandaran Province, Iran. At the 2016 census, its population was 18, in 7 families. Down from 65 people in 2006.
