= Gol Chigi =

Gol Chigi گل چيگي
- Village
- Location within Iran
- Coordinates: 36°50′50″N 50°40′15″E
- Country: Iran
- Province: Mazandaran
- County: Ramsar
- Bakhsh: Central
- Rural District: Chehel Shahid

Population (2006)
  - Total: 33
- Time zone: UTC+3:30 (IRST)
  - Summer (DST): UTC+4:30 (IRDT)

Gol Chigi (Persian: گل چيگي, also Romanized as Gol Chīgī; also known as Gol Chīkeh) is a village in Chehel Shahid Rural District, in the Central District of Ramsar County, Mazandaran Province, Iran. At the 2006 census, its population was 33, in 9 families.
