= Bahar Poshteh =

Bahar Poshteh بهارپشته
- Village
- Location within Iran
- Coordinates: 36°49′13″N 50°42′37″E
- Country: Iran
- Province: Mazandaran
- County: Ramsar
- Bakhsh: Central
- Rural District: Chehel Shahid

Population (2006)
  - Total: 94
- Time zone: UTC+3:30 (IRST)
  - Summer (DST): UTC+4:30 (IRDT)

Bahar Poshteh (Persian: بهارپشته, also Romanized as Bahār Poshteh; also known as Barposhteh) is a village in Chehel Shahid Rural District, in the Central District of Ramsar County, Mazandaran Province, Iran. At the 2006 census, its population was 94, in 25 families.
