= Gavlimak =

Gavlimak گاوليماك
- Village
- Location within Iran
- Coordinates: 36°51′07″N 50°42′14″E
- Country: Iran
- Province: Mazandaran
- County: Ramsar
- Bakhsh: Central
- Rural District: Chehel Shahid

Population (2006)
  - Total: 184
- Time zone: UTC+3:30 (IRST)
  - Summer (DST): UTC+4:30 (IRDT)

Gavlimak (Persian: گاوليماك, also Romanized as Gāvlīmāk) is a village in Chehel Shahid Rural District, in the Central District of Ramsar County, Mazandaran Province, Iran. At the 2006 census, its population was 184, in 54 families.
