= Vachkalayeh =

Vachkalayeh واچكلايه
- Village
- Location within Iran
- Coordinates: 36°54′32″N 50°35′40″E
- Country: Iran
- Province: Mazandaran
- County: Ramsar
- Bakhsh: Central
- Rural District: Sakht Sar

Population (2006)
  - Total: 146
- Time zone: UTC+3:30 (IRST)

Vachkalayeh (Persian: واچكلايه, also Romanized as Vāchkalāyeh) is a village in Sakht Sar Rural District, in the Central District of Ramsar County, Mazandaran Province, Iran. At the 2016 census, its population was 98, in 32 families. Down from 146 in 2006.
