= Kenar Rud =

Kenar Rud كناررود
- Village
- Location within Iran
- Coordinates: 36°52′20″N 50°29′38″E
- Country: Iran
- Province: Mazandaran
- County: Ramsar
- Bakhsh: Central
- Rural District: Sakht Sar

Population (2006)
  - Total: 17
- Time zone: UTC+3:30 (IRST)

Kenar Rud (Persian: كناررود, also Romanized as Kenār Rūd) is a village in Sakht Sar Rural District, in the Central District of Ramsar County, Mazandaran Province, Iran. At the 2006 census, its population was 17, in 8 families. In 2016, it had less than 4 households.
