= Bala Jir Kuh =

Bala Jir Kuh بالاجيركوه
- Village
- Location within Iran
- Coordinates: 36°52′00″N 50°30′07″E
- Country: Iran
- Province: Mazandaran
- County: Ramsar
- Bakhsh: Central
- Rural District: Sakht Sar

Population (2006)
  - Total: 21
- Time zone: UTC+3:30 (IRST)

Bala Jir Kuh (Persian: بالاجيركوه, also Romanized as Bālā Jīr Kūh; also known as Jīr Kūh) is a village in Sakht Sar Rural District, in the Central District of Ramsar County, Mazandaran Province, Iran. At the 2006 census, its population was 21, in 7 households. The village had less than 4 households in 2016.
