= Ekra Sar =

Village in Mazandaran province, Iran

Ekra Sar Persian: اكراسر
- Village
- Location within Iran
- Coordinates: 36°47′15″N 50°32′18″E
- Country: Iran
- Province: Mazandaran
- County: Ramsar
- District: Dalkhani
- Rural District: Jennat Rudbar

Population (2016)
  - Total: 26
- Time zone: UTC+3:30 (IRST)

Ekra Sar (Persian: اكراسر) (Note: Also romanized as Ekrā Sar) is a village in Jennat Rudbar Rural District of Dalkhani District in Ramsar County, Mazandaran province, Iran.

== Demographics ==
=== Population ===
At the time of the 2006 National Census, the village's population was 15 in six households, when it was in the Central District. The following census in 2011 counted 48 people in 16 households. The 2016 census measured the population of the village as 26 people in 12 households.

In 2019, the rural district was separated from the district in the formation of Dalkhani District.
