= Rashposhteh =

Rashposhteh راش پشته
- Village
- Location within Iran
- Coordinates: 36°51′31″N 50°39′55″E
- Country: Iran
- Province: Mazandaran
- County: Ramsar
- Bakhsh: Central
- Rural District: Chehel Shahid

Population (2006)
  - Total: 22
- Time zone: UTC+3:30 (IRST)
  - Summer (DST): UTC+4:30 (IRDT)

Rashposhteh (Persian: راش پشته, also Romanized as Rāshposhteh) is a village in Chehel Shahid Rural District, in the Central District of Ramsar County, Mazandaran Province, Iran. At the 2006 census, its population was 22, in 7 families.
