= Palhamjan =

Village in Mazandaran province, Iran

Palhamjan Persian: پلهم جان
- Village
- Location within Iran
- Coordinates: 36°45′05″N 50°33′14″E
- Country: Iran
- Province: Mazandaran
- County: Ramsar
- District: Dalkhani
- Rural District: Jennat Rudbar

Population (2016)
  - Total: 0
- Time zone: UTC+3:30 (IRST)

Palhamjan (Persian: پلهم جان) (Note: Also romanized as Palhamjān) is a village in Jennat Rudbar Rural District of Dalkhani District in Ramsar County, Mazandaran province, Iran.

== Demographics ==
=== Population ===
At the time of the 2006 National Census, the village's population was 16 in six households, when it was in the Central District. The following census in 2011 counted 17 people in seven households. The 2016 census measured the population of the village as zero.

In 2019, the rural district was separated from the district in the formation of Dalkhani District.
