= Ligah =

Village in Mazandaran province, Iran

Ligah Persian: ليگاه
- Village
- Location within Iran
- Coordinates: 36°40′45″N 50°34′06″E
- Country: Iran
- Province: Mazandaran
- County: Ramsar
- District: Dalkhani
- Rural District: Jennat Rudbar

Population (2016)
  - Total: 78
- Time zone: UTC+3:30 (IRST)

Ligah (Persian: ليگاه) (Note: Also romanized as Līgāh; also known as Legā) is a village in Jennat Rudbar Rural District of Dalkhani District in Ramsar County, Mazandaran province, Iran.

== Demographics ==
=== Population ===
At the time of the 2006 National Census, the village's population was 18 in 17 households, when it was in the Central District. The following census in 2011 counted 47 people in 16 households. The 2016 census measured the population of the village as 78 people in 27 households.

In 2019, the rural district was separated from the district in the formation of Dalkhani District.
