= Tallar Sar =

Tallar Sar or Talarsar (Persian: طلار سر) may refer to:

- Tallar Sar-e Gharbi
- Tallar Sar-e Sharqi
