= Talesh Mahalleh-ye Fatuk =

Village in Mazandaran province, Iran

Talesh Mahalleh-ye Fatuk Persian: طالش محله فتوک
- Village
- Location within Iran
- Coordinates: 36°56′07″N 50°37′38″E
- Country: Iran
- Province: Mazandaran
- County: Ramsar
- District: Central
- Rural District: Sakht Sar

Population (2016)
  - Total: 1,106
- Time zone: UTC+3:30 (IRST)

Talesh Mahalleh-ye Fatuk (Persian: طالش محله فتوک) (Note: Also romanized as Ţālesh Maḩalleh-ye Fatūk) is a village in Sakht Sar Rural District of the Central District in Ramsar County, Mazandaran province, Iran.

== Demographics ==
=== Population ===
At the time of the 2006 National Census, the village's population was 949 in 270 households. The following census in 2011 counted 1,066 people in 335 households. The 2016 census measured the population of the village as 1,106 people in 375 households, the most populous in its rural district.
