= Shad Mansur Mahalleh =

Village in Mazandaran province, Iran

Shad Mansur Mahalleh Persian: شادمنصورمحله
- Village
- Location within Iran
- Coordinates: 36°55′53″N 50°37′54″E
- Country: Iran
- Province: Mazandaran
- County: Ramsar
- District: Central
- Rural District: Sakht Sar

Population (2016)
  - Total: 899
- Time zone: UTC+3:30 (IRST)

Shad Mansur Mahalleh (Persian: شادمنصورمحله) (Note: Also romanized as Shād Manşūr Maḩalleh; formerly known as Shāh Manşūr Maḩalleh (شاه منصور محله)) is a village in Sakht Sar Rural District of the Central District in Ramsar County, Mazandaran province, Iran.

== Demographics ==
=== Population ===
At the time of the 2006 National Census, the village's population was 466 in 127 households. The following census in 2011 counted 719 people in 225 households. The 2016 census measured the population of the village as 899 people in 280 households.
