= Lej =

Lej or LEJ may refer to:

== Places ==
- Ləj, a village and municipality in the Lankaran Rayon of Azerbaijan
- Lej, Iran, a village in West Azerbaijan Province, Iran
- Lashkar-e-Jhangvi (LeJ), an Islamist militant organization.
- Leipzig/Halle Airport, a public airport serving both Leipzig, Saxony and Halle, Saxony-Anhalt, Germany

== Others ==
- Lengola language, a Bantu language of the Democratic Republic of the Congo
- L.E.J, a French singing trio
