= Mij, Mazandaran =

Village in Mazandaran province, Iran

Mij Persian: ميج
- Village
- Location within Iran
- Coordinates: 36°36′43″N 50°28′54″E
- Country: Iran
- Province: Mazandaran
- County: Ramsar
- District: Central
- Rural District: Eshkevar

Population (2016)
  - Total: 88
- Time zone: UTC+3:30 (IRST)

Mij (Persian: ميج) (Note: Also romanized as Mīj) is a village in Eshkevar Rural District of the Central District in Ramsar County, Mazandaran province, Iran.

== Demographics ==
=== Population ===
At the time of the 2006 National Census, the village's population was 138 in 35 households. The following census in 2011 counted 110 people in 31 households. The 2016 census measured the population of the village as 88 people in 27 households.
