= Shad Morad Mahalleh, Mazandaran =

Village in Mazandaran province, Iran

Shad Morad Mahalleh Persian: شادمرادمحله
- Village
- Location within Iran
- Coordinates: 36°51′40″N 50°44′58″E
- Country: Iran
- Province: Mazandaran
- County: Ramsar
- District: Dalkhani
- Rural District: Chehel Shahid

Population (2016)
  - Total: 310
- Time zone: UTC+3:30 (IRST)

Shad Morad Mahalleh (Persian: شادمرادمحله) (Note: Also romanized as Shād Morād Maḩalleh; formerly known as Shahmorad Mahalleh (شاهمرادمحله), also romanized as Shāhmorād Maḩalleh) is a village in Chehel Shahid Rural District of Dalkhani District in Ramsar County, Mazandaran province, Iran.

== Population ==
At the time of the 2006 National Census, the village's population was 313 in 79 households, when it was in the Central District. The following census in 2011 counted 316 people in 92 households. The 2016 census measured the population of the village as 310 people in 102 households.

In 2019, the rural district was separated from the district in the formation of Dalkhani District.
