= Tarmak =

Tarmak ترمك
- Village
- Country: Iran
- Province: Mazandaran
- County: Ramsar
- Bakhsh: Central
- Rural District: Sakht Sar

Population (2006)
  - Total: 17
- Time zone: UTC+3:30 (IRST)

Tarmak (Persian: ترمك) is a village in Sakht Sar Rural District, in the Central District of Ramsar County, Mazandaran Province, Iran. At the 2016 census, its population was 13, in 4 families. Down from 17 in 2006.
