= Darya Poshteh =

Village in Mazandaran province, Iran

Darya Poshteh Persian: درياپشته
- Village
- Location within Iran
- Coordinates: 36°56′49″N 50°37′38″E
- Country: Iran
- Province: Mazandaran
- County: Ramsar
- District: Central
- Rural District: Sakht Sar

Population (2016)
  - Total: 865
- Time zone: UTC+3:30 (IRST)

Darya Poshteh (Persian: درياپشته) (Note: Also romanized as Daryā Poshteh; also known as Daryapushteh and Daryāpushti) is a village in Sakht Sar Rural District of the Central District in Ramsar County, Mazandaran province, Iran.

== Demographics ==
=== Population ===
At the time of the 2006 National Census, the village's population was 770 in 217 households. The following census in 2011 counted 816 people in 248 households. The 2016 census measured the population of the village as 865 people in 292 households.
