= Tazeh Patak =

Village in Mazandaran province, Iran

Tazeh Patak Persian: تازه پتک
- Village
- Location within Iran
- Coordinates: 36°55′57″N 50°36′18″E
- Country: Iran
- Province: Mazandaran
- County: Ramsar
- District: Central
- Rural District: Sakht Sar

Population (2016)
  - Total: 158
- Time zone: UTC+3:30 (IRST)

Tazeh Patak (Persian: تازه پتک) (Note: Also romanized as Tāzeh Patak) is a village in Sakht Sar Rural District of the Central District in Ramsar County, Mazandaran province, Iran.

== Demographics ==
=== Population ===
At the time of the 2006 National Census, the village's population was 109 in 34 households. The following census in 2011 counted 165 people in 53 households. The 2016 census measured the population of the village as 158 people in 52 households.
