= Lapa Sarak =

Village in Mazandaran province, Iran

Lapa Sarak Persian: لپاسرك
- Village
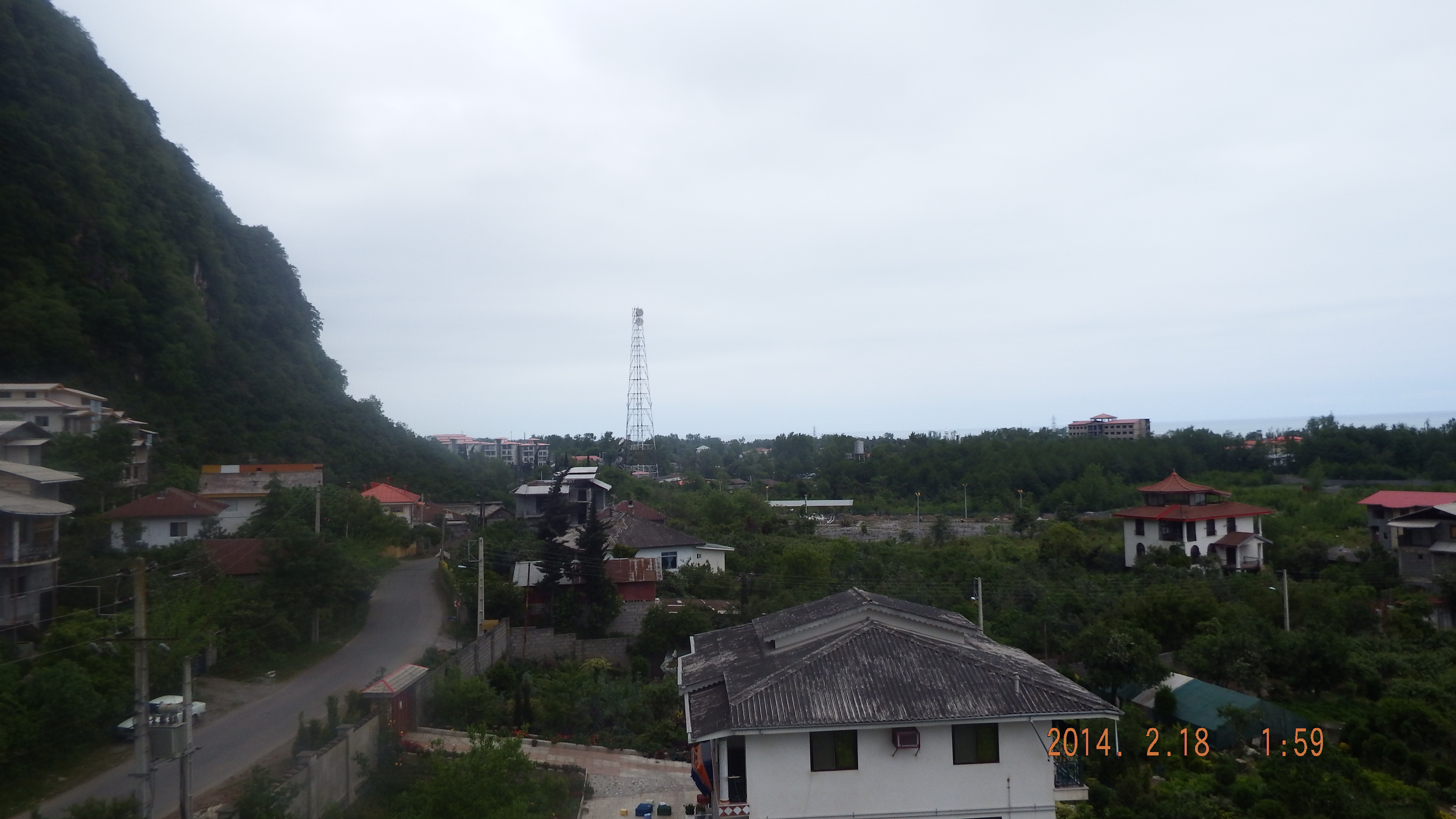
- The village of Lapa Sarak

- Location within Iran
- Coordinates: 36°56′35″N 50°37′06″E
- Country: Iran
- Province: Mazandaran
- County: Ramsar
- District: Central
- Rural District: Sakht Sar

Population (2016)
  - Total: 347
- Time zone: UTC+3:30 (IRST)

Lapa Sarak (Persian: لپاسرك) (Note: Also romanized as Lapā Sarak; also known as Espā Sar and Lapā Sar) is a village in Sakht Sar Rural District of the Central District in Ramsar County, Mazandaran province, Iran.

== Demographics ==
=== Population ===
At the time of the 2006 National Census, the village's population was 242 in 70 households. The following census in 2011 counted 246 people in 75 households. The 2016 census measured the population of the village as 347 people in 119 households.
