= Chalakrud =

Village in Mazandaran province, Iran

Chalakrud Persian: چالكرود
- Village
- Location within Iran
- Coordinates: 36°52′17″N 50°46′08″E
- Country: Iran
- Province: Mazandaran
- County: Ramsar
- District: Dalkhani
- Rural District: Chehel Shahid

Population (2016)
  - Total: 577
- Time zone: UTC+3:30 (IRST)

Chalakrud (Persian: چالكرود) (Note: Also romanized as Chālakrūd and Chālkorūd; also known as Chalak Roor) is a village in, and the capital of, Chehel Shahid Rural District in Dalkhani District of Ramsar County, Mazandaran province, Iran. The previous capital of the rural district was the village of Galesh Mahalleh, now the city of Dalkhani.

== Demographics ==
=== Population ===
At the time of the 2006 National Census, the village's population was 516 in 154 households, when it was in the Central District. The following census in 2011 counted 559 people in 188 households. The 2016 census measured the population of the village as 577 people in 221 households.

In 2019, the rural district was separated from the district in the formation of Dalkhani District.
