= Eyfi =

Village in Mazandaran province, Iran

Eyfi Persian: افی
- Village
- Location within Iran
- Coordinates: 36°38′35″N 50°26′54″E
- Country: Iran
- Province: Mazandaran
- County: Ramsar
- District: Central
- Rural District: Eshkevar

Population (2016)
  - Total: 26
- Time zone: UTC+3:30 (IRST)

Efi (Persian: افی) (Note: Also romanized as Efī) is a village in Eshkevar Rural District of the Central District in Ramsar County, Mazandaran province, Iran.

== Demographics ==
=== Population ===
At the time of the 2006 National Census, the village's population was 65 in 20 households. The following census in 2011 counted 34 people in 13 households. The 2016 census measured the population of the village as 26 people in 12 households.
