= Kalij Kuh =

Village in Mazandaran province, Iran

Kalij Kuh Persian: كليج كوه
- Village
- Location within Iran
- Coordinates: 36°53′10″N 50°38′46″E
- Country: Iran
- Province: Mazandaran
- County: Ramsar
- District: Central
- Rural District: Sakht Sar

Population (2016)
  - Total: 119
- Time zone: UTC+3:30 (IRST)

Kalij Kuh (Persian: كليج كوه) (Note: Also romanized as Kalīj Kūh; also known as Kalīch Kūh) is a village in Sakht Sar Rural District of the Central District in Ramsar County, Mazandaran province, Iran.

== Demographics ==
=== Population ===
At the time of the 2006 National Census, the village's population was 142 in 37 households. The following census in 2011 counted 119 people in 35 households. The 2016 census measured the population of the village as 119 people in 36 households.
