= Loj =

Loj may refer to:

== Geography ==
- Loj, Mazandaran, Iran
- Loj Island, Erikub Atoll, Marshall Islands

== People ==
- Ellen Margrethe Løj (born 1948), Danish diplomat
- Ewaryst Łój (1912–1973), Polish basketball player
- Zbigniew Łój (1945–2022), Polish field hockey player

== Other ==
- Lou language (Austronesian), ISO 639 code: loj

== See also ==
- Laj (disambiguation)
