= Siasan =

Village in Mazandaran province, Iran

Siasan Persian: سياسان
- Village
- Location within Iran
- Coordinates: 36°53′24″N 50°39′49″E
- Country: Iran
- Province: Mazandaran
- County: Ramsar
- District: Central
- Rural District: Sakht Sar

Population (2016)
  - Total: 134
- Time zone: UTC+3:30 (IRST)

Siasan (Persian: سياسان) (Note: Also romanized as Sīāsān) is a village in Sakht Sar Rural District of the Central District in Ramsar County, Mazandaran province, Iran.

== Demographics ==
=== Population ===
At the time of the 2006 National Census, the village's population was 167 in 45 households. The following census in 2011 counted 115 people in 38 households. The 2016 census measured the population of the village as 134 people in 45 households.
