= Tallar Sar-e Gharbi =

Tallar Sar-e Gharbi طلار سر غربي
- Village
- Location within Iran
- Coordinates: 36°50′57″N 50°43′19″E
- Country: Iran
- Province: Mazandaran
- County: Ramsar
- Bakhsh: Central
- Rural District: Chehel Shahid

Population (2006)
  - Total: 366
- Time zone: UTC+3:30 (IRST)
  - Summer (DST): UTC+4:30 (IRDT)

Tallar Sar-e Gharbi (Persian: طلار سر غربي, also Romanized as Ţallār Sar-e Gharbī; also known as Ţalārsar) is a village in Chehel Shahid Rural District, in the Central District of Ramsar County, Mazandaran Province, Iran. At the 2006 census, its population was 366, in 97 families.
