= Limakadeh =

Village in Mazandaran province, Iran

Limakadeh Persian: ليماكده
- Village
- Location within Iran
- Coordinates: 36°47′44″N 50°34′32″E
- Country: Iran
- Province: Mazandaran
- County: Ramsar
- District: Dalkhani
- Rural District: Jennat Rudbar

Population (2016)
  - Total: 34
- Time zone: UTC+3:30 (IRST)

Limakadeh (Persian: ليماكده) (Note: Also romanized as Līmāk Deh and Līmākadeh) is a village in Jennat Rudbar Rural District of Dalkhani District in Ramsar County, Mazandaran province, Iran.

== Demographics ==
=== Population ===
At the time of the 2006 National Census, the village's population was 20 in 10 households, when it was in the Central District. The following census in 2011 counted 25 people in 10 households. The 2016 census measured the population of the village as 34 people in 13 households.

In 2019, the rural district was separated from the district in the formation of Dalkhani District.
