= Garkesh =

Village in Mazandaran province, Iran

Garkesh Persian: گركش
- Village
- Location within Iran
- Coordinates: 36°47′33″N 50°30′42″E
- Country: Iran
- Province: Mazandaran
- County: Ramsar
- District: Dalkhani
- Rural District: Jennat Rudbar

Population (2016)
  - Total: Below reporting threshold
- Time zone: UTC+3:30 (IRST)

Garkesh (Persian: گركش) (Note: Also known as Karīkesh) is a village in Jennat Rudbar Rural District of Dalkhani District in Ramsar County, Mazandaran province, Iran.

== Demographics ==
=== Population ===
At the time of the 2006 National Census, the village's population was 22 in eight households, when it was in the Central District. The village did not appear in the following census of 2011. The 2016 census measured the population of the village as below the reporting threshold.

In 2019, the rural district was separated from the district in the formation of Dalkhani District.
