= Astal Kenar =

Village in Mazandaran province, Iran

Astal Kenar Persian: استل كنار
- Village
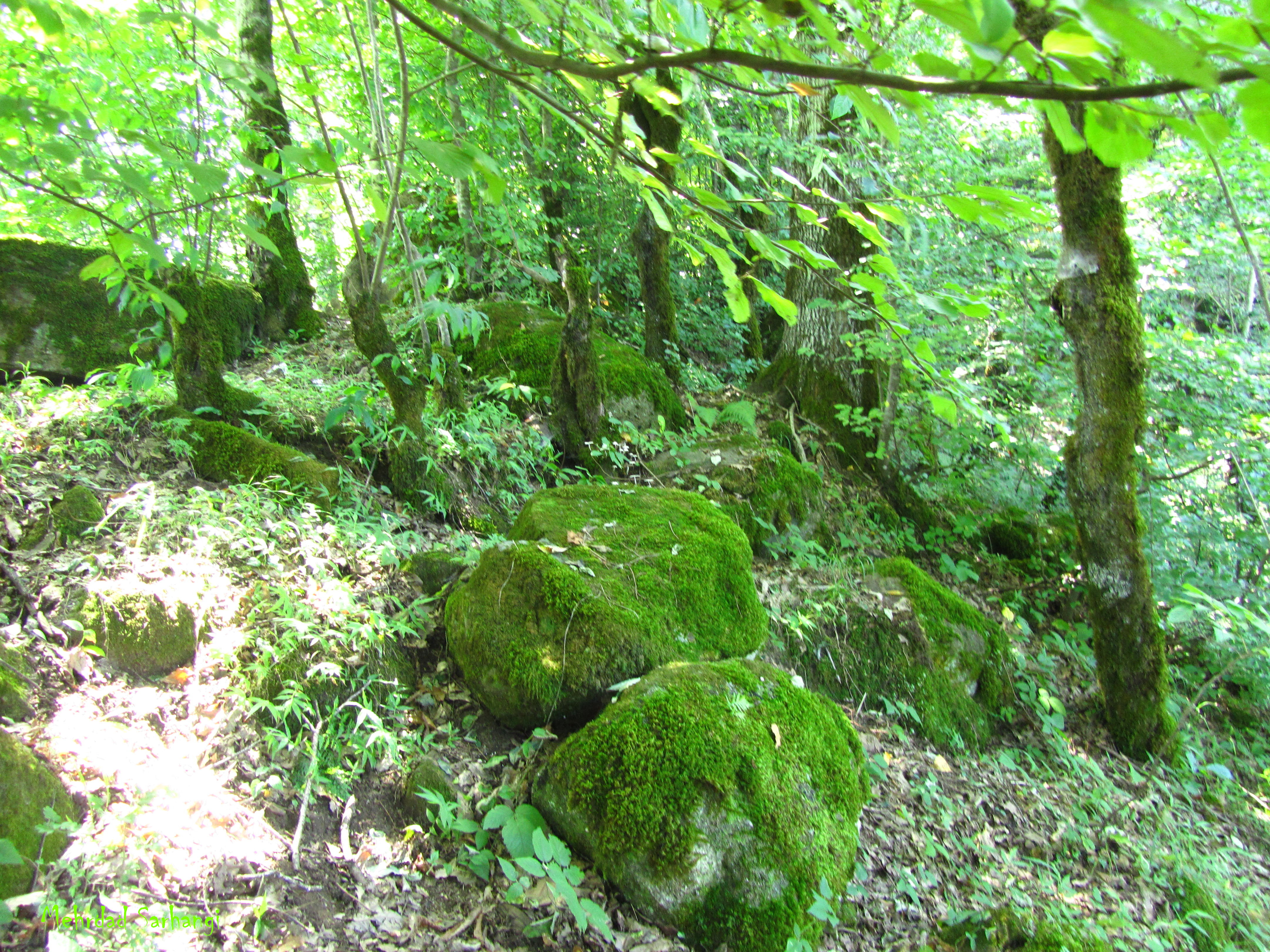
- Forest near the village of Astal Kenar

- Location within Iran
- Coordinates: 36°54′41″N 50°36′32″E
- Country: Iran
- Province: Mazandaran
- County: Ramsar
- District: Central
- Rural District: Sakht Sar

Population (2016)
  - Total: 131
- Time zone: UTC+3:30 (IRST)

Astal Kenar (Persian: استل كنار) (Note: Also romanized as Astal Kenār) is a village in Sakht Sar Rural District of the Central District in Ramsar County, Mazandaran province, Iran.

== Demographics ==
=== Population ===
At the time of the 2006 National Census, the village's population was 158 in 46 households. The following census in 2011 counted 127 people in 43 households. The 2016 census measured the population of the village as 131 people in 49 households.
