= Kit, Iran =

Village in Mazandaran province, Iran

Kit Persian: كيت
- Village
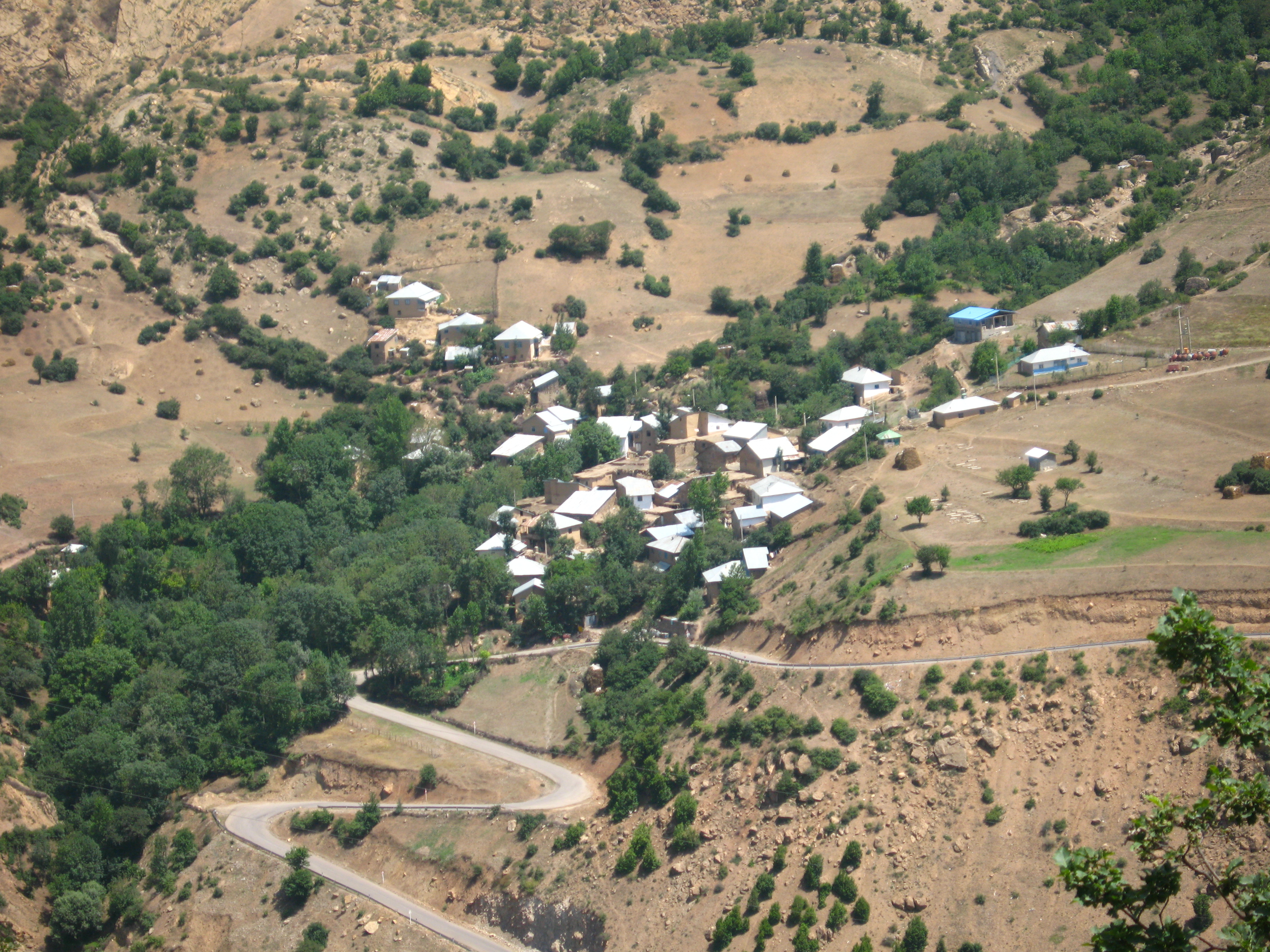
- The village of Kit

- Location within Iran
- Coordinates: 36°39′59″N 50°23′33″E
- Country: Iran
- Province: Mazandaran
- County: Ramsar
- District: Central
- Rural District: Eshkevar

Population (2016)
  - Total: 32
- Time zone: UTC+3:30 (IRST)

Kit (Persian: كيت) (Note: Also romanized as Kīt; also known as Kat) is a village in Eshkevar Rural District of the Central District in Ramsar County, Mazandaran province, Iran.

== Demographics ==
=== Population ===
At the time of the 2006 National Census, the village's population was 90 in 22 households. The following census in 2011 counted 76 people in 23 households. The 2016 census measured the population of the village as 32 people in 12 households.
