= Limak (disambiguation) =

Limak is a village in Chehel Shahid, Iran.

Limak may also refer to:

- Limak Holding, a Turkish conglomerate with interests in construction, energy, cement, and tourism
- Limak Deh, a village in Jennat Rudbar, Iran
