= Mian Lat =

Village in Mazandaran province, Iran

Mian Lat Persian: ميان لات
- Village
- Location within Iran
- Coordinates: 36°54′17″N 50°36′17″E
- Country: Iran
- Province: Mazandaran
- County: Ramsar
- District: Central
- Rural District: Sakht Sar

Population (2016)
  - Total: 262
- Time zone: UTC+3:30 (IRST)

Mian Lat (Persian: ميان لات) (Note: Also romanized as Mīān Lāt) is a village in Sakht Sar Rural District of the Central District in Ramsar County, Mazandaran province, Iran.

== Demographics ==
=== Population ===
At the time of the 2006 National Census, the village's population was 360 in 97 households. The following census in 2011 counted 307 people in 91 households. The 2016 census measured the population of the village as 262 people in 89 households.
