= Narneh =

Village in Mazandaran province, Iran

Narneh Persian: نارنه
- Village
- Location within Iran
- Coordinates: 36°37′50″N 50°25′46″E
- Country: Iran
- Province: Mazandaran
- County: Ramsar
- District: Central
- Rural District: Eshkevar

Population (2016)
  - Total: 80
- Time zone: UTC+3:30 (IRST)

Narneh (Persian: نارنه) (Note: Also romanized as Nārneh) is a village in Eshkevar Rural District of the Central District in Ramsar County, Mazandaran province, Iran.

== Demographics ==
=== Population ===
At the time of the 2006 National Census, the village's population was 114 in 25 households. The following census in 2011 counted 90 people in 26 households. The 2016 census measured the population of the village as 80 people in 24 households.
