= Akaneh =

Village in Mazandaran province, Iran

Akaneh Persian: اكنه
- Village
- Location within Iran
- Coordinates: 36°37′57″N 50°28′22″E
- Country: Iran
- Province: Mazandaran
- County: Ramsar
- District: Central
- Rural District: Eshkevar

Population (2016)
  - Total: 18
- Time zone: UTC+3:30 (IRST)

Akaneh (Persian: اكنه) is a village in Eshkevar Rural District of the Central District in Ramsar County, Mazandaran province, Iran.

== Demographics ==
=== Population ===
At the time of the 2006 National Census, the village's population was 63 in 20 households. The following census in 2011 counted 31 people in 10 households. The 2016 census measured the population of the village as 18 people in seven households.
