= Karikesh =

Karikesh (Persian: كريكش) may refer to:

- Garikesh
- Garkesh
