= Kalayeh, Mazandaran =

Village in Mazandaran province, Iran

Kalayeh Persian: كلايه
- Village
- Location within Iran
- Coordinates: 36°37′53″N 50°27′15″E
- Country: Iran
- Province: Mazandaran
- County: Ramsar
- District: Central
- Rural District: Eshkevar

Population (2016)
  - Total: 42
- Time zone: UTC+3:30 (IRST)

Kalayeh (Persian: كلايه) (Note: Also romanized as Kalāyeh) is a village in Eshkevar Rural District of the Central District in Ramsar County, Mazandaran province, Iran.

== Demographics ==
=== Population ===
At the time of the 2006 National Census, the village's population was 63 in 17 households. The following census in 2011 counted 56 people in 19 households. The 2016 census measured the population of the village as 42 people in 17 households.
