= Hasan Sara, Mazandaran =

Hasan Sara حسن سرا
- Village
- Location within Iran
- Coordinates: 37°06′25″N 50°21′03″E
- Country: Iran
- Province: Mazandaran
- County: Ramsar
- Bakhsh: Central
- Rural District: Sakht Sar

Population (2006)
  - Total: 111
- Time zone: UTC+3:30 (IRST)

Hasan Sara (Persian: حسن سرا, also Romanized as Ḩasan Sarā; also known as Ḩanak Sarā and Ḩasanak Sarā) is a village in Sakht Sar Rural District, in the Central District of Ramsar County, Mazandaran Province, Iran. At the 2016 census, its population was 71, in 23 families. Down from 111 in 2006.

Hassan Sara did not have a local seat until 2017.
