= Garikesh =

Village in Mazandaran province, Iran

Garikesh Persian: گريكش
- Village
- Location within Iran
- Country: Iran
- Province: Mazandaran
- County: Ramsar
- District: Dalkhani
- Rural District: Jennat Rudbar

Population (2016)
  - Total: 0
- Time zone: UTC+3:30 (IRST)

Garikesh (Persian: گريكش) (Note: Also romanized as Garīkesh; also known as Karīkesh) is a village in Jennat Rudbar Rural District of Dalkhani District in Ramsar County, Mazandaran province, Iran.

== Demographics ==
=== Population ===
At the time of the 2006 National Census, when the village was part of the Central District., its population was 23 across eight households. The village did not appear in the following census of 2011. The 2016 census measured the population of the village as zero.

In 2019, the rural district was separated from the district in the formation of Dalkhani District.
