= Nadak =

Village in Mazandaran province, Iran

Nadak Persian: نداک
- Village
- Location within Iran
- Coordinates: 36°37′47″N 50°26′50″E
- Country: Iran
- Province: Mazandaran
- County: Ramsar
- District: Central
- Rural District: Eshkevar

Population (2016)
  - Total: 46
- Time zone: UTC+3:30 (IRST)

Nadak (Persian: نداک) (Note: Also romanized as Nadāk) is a village in Eshkevar Rural District of the Central District in Ramsar County, Mazandaran province, Iran.

== Demographics ==
=== Population ===
At the time of the 2006 National Census, the village's population was 98 in 26 households. The following census in 2011 counted 66 people in 23 households. The 2016 census measured the population of the village as 46 people in 17 households.
