= Shad Morad Mahalleh =

Shad Morad Mahalleh (Persian: شادمرادمحله), also known as Shah Morad Mahalleh, may refer to:

- Shad Morad Mahalleh, Chaboksar
- Shad Morad Mahalleh, Kelachay
- Shad Morad Mahalleh, Mazandaran
