= Basl Kuh =

Village in Mazandaran province, Iran

Basl Kuh Persian: بصل كوه
- Village
- Location within Iran
- Coordinates: 36°52′01″N 50°45′38″E
- Country: Iran
- Province: Mazandaran
- County: Ramsar
- District: Dalkhani
- Rural District: Chehel Shahid

Population (2016)
  - Total: 653
- Time zone: UTC+3:30 (IRST)

Basl Kuh (Persian: بصل كوه) (Note: Also romanized as Başl Kūh) is a village in Chehel Shahid Rural District of Dalkhani District in Ramsar County, Mazandaran province, Iran.

== Population ==
At the time of the 2006 National Census, the village's population was 650 in 186 households, when it was in the Central District. The following census in 2011 counted 602 people in 190 households. The 2016 census measured the population of the village as 653 people in 223 households.

In 2019, the rural district was separated from the district in the formation of Dalkhani District.
