= Gavramak =

Village in Mazandaran province, Iran

Gavramak Persian: گاورمك
- Village
- Location within Iran
- Coordinates: 36°53′53″N 50°36′47″E
- Country: Iran
- Province: Mazandaran
- County: Ramsar
- District: Central
- Rural District: Sakht Sar

Population (2016)
  - Total: 127
- Time zone: UTC+3:30 (IRST)

Gavramak (Persian: گاورمك) (Note: Also romanized as Gāvramak; also known as Gāvramak-e Bālā) is a village in Sakht Sar Rural District of the Central District in Ramsar County, Mazandaran province, Iran.

== Demographics ==
=== Population ===
At the time of the 2006 National Census, the village's population was 126 in 33 households. The following census in 2011 counted 159 people in 47 households. The 2016 census measured the population of the village as 127 people in 43 households.
