= Limak =

Village in Mazandaran province, Iran

Limak Persian: لیماک
- Village
- Location within Iran
- Coordinates: 36°50′19″N 50°44′32″E
- Country: Iran
- Province: Mazandaran
- County: Ramsar
- District: Dalkhani
- Rural District: Chehel Shahid

Population (2016)
  - Total: 1,183
- Time zone: UTC+3:30 (IRST)

Limak (Persian: لیماک) (Note: Also romanized as Līmāk) is a village in Chehel Shahid Rural District of Dalkhani District in Ramsar County, Mazandaran province, Iran.

== Demographics ==
=== Language and ethnicity ===
People in the village are Gilaks and speak Gilaki.

=== Population ===
At the time of the 2006 National Census, the village's population was 1,010 in 286 households, when it was in the Central District. The following census in 2011 counted 913 people in 278 households. The 2016 census measured the population of the village as 1,183 people in 393 households.

In 2019, the rural district was separated from the district in the formation of Dalkhani District.
