= Churteh =

Village in Mazandaran province, Iran

Churteh Persian: چورته
- Village
- Location within Iran
- Coordinates: 36°46′13″N 50°32′14″E
- Country: Iran
- Province: Mazandaran
- County: Ramsar
- District: Dalkhani
- Rural District: Jennat Rudbar

Population (2016)
  - Total: 24
- Time zone: UTC+3:30 (IRST)

Churteh (Persian: چورته) (Note: Also romanized as Chūrteh; also known as Choorti, Chortī, and Chūrdeh) is a village in Jennat Rudbar Rural District of Dalkhani District in Ramsar County, Mazandaran province, Iran.

== Demographics ==
=== Population ===
At the time of the 2006 National Census, the village's population was 25 in eight households, when it was in the Central District. The following census in 2011 counted 20 people in eight households. The 2016 census measured the population of the village as 24 people in 11 households.

In 2019, the rural district was separated from the district in the formation of Dalkhani District.
