= Separ Deh =

Village in Mazandaran province, Iran

Separ Deh Persian: سپارده
- Village
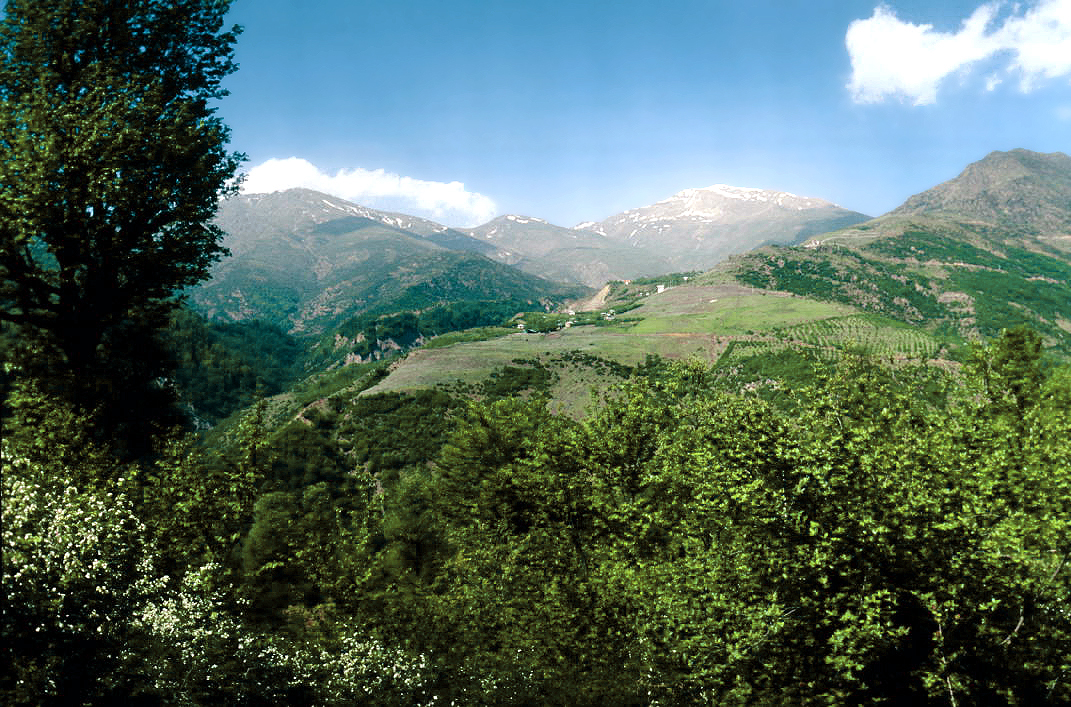
- The village of Separ Deh

- Location within Iran
- Coordinates: 36°39′22″N 50°23′42″E
- Country: Iran
- Province: Mazandaran
- County: Ramsar
- District: Central
- Rural District: Eshkevar

Population (2016)
  - Total: 210
- Time zone: UTC+3:30 (IRST)

Separ Deh (Persian: سپارده) (Note: Also romanized as Sepār Deh; also known as Sebār Deh) is a village in Eshkevar Rural District of the Central District in Ramsar County, Mazandaran province, Iran.

== Demographics ==
=== Population ===
At the time of the 2006 National Census, the village's population was 381 in 115 households. The following census in 2011 counted 328 people in 106 households. The 2016 census measured the population of the village as 210 people in 77 households.

== See also ==
Media related to Separ Deh at Wikimedia Commons
