= Tang Darreh-ye Gharbi =

Village in Mazandaran province, Iran

Tang Darreh-ye Gharbi Persian: تنگ دره غربي
- Village
- Location within Iran
- Country: Iran
- Province: Mazandaran
- County: Ramsar
- District: Central
- Rural District: Sakht Sar

Population (2016)
  - Total: 377
- Time zone: UTC+3:30 (IRST)

Tang Darreh-ye Gharbi (Persian: تنگ دره غربي) (Note: Also romanized as Tang Darreh-ye Gharbī; also known as Tang Darreh) is a village in Sakht Sar Rural District of the Central District in Ramsar County, Mazandaran province, Iran.

== Demographics ==
=== Population ===
At the time of the 2006 National Census, the village's population was 273 in 78 households. The following census in 2011 counted 212 people in 64 households. The 2016 census measured the population of the village as 377 people in 124 households.
