= Sefid Tameshk =

Village in Mazandaran province, Iran

Sefid Tameshk Persian: سفيدتمشک
- Village
- Location within Iran
- Coordinates: 36°57′26″N 50°35′33″E
- Country: Iran
- Province: Mazandaran
- County: Ramsar
- District: Central
- Rural District: Sakht Sar

Population (2016)
  - Total: 618
- Time zone: UTC+3:30 (IRST)

Sefid Tameshk (Persian: سفيدتمشک) (Note: Also romanized as Sefīd Tameshk) is a village in Sakht Sar Rural District of the Central District in Ramsar County, Mazandaran province, Iran. It is at the eastern end of the province near the border with Gilan province.

== Demographics ==
=== Population ===
At the time of the 2006 National Census, the village's population was 634 in 183 households. The following census in 2011 counted 578 people in 179 households. The 2016 census measured the population of the village as 618 people in 211 households.
