= Tarmac =

Tarmac may refer to:

== Engineered surfaces ==
- Tarmacadam, a mainly historical tar-based material for macadamising road surfaces, patented in 1902
- Asphalt concrete, a macadamising material using asphalt instead of tar which has largely superseded tarmacadam
- Tarmac, a colloquial term often applied to any paved surface of an airport, regardless of material, including the
  - Airport apron
  - Taxiway
  - Runway

== Companies ==
- Tarmac (company), a British building materials company
- Tarmac Building Products, the construction materials division of Tarmac
- Tarmac Group, former UK-based multinational building materials and construction company
- Tarmac Construction, part of Tarmac Group until 1999 when sold off as Carillion

== See also ==
- Tarmak, a village in Sakht Sar Rural District, Central District of Ramsar County, Mazandaran Province, Iran
- Tarmac scam or tarmacking, a confidence trick
