= Yazan =

Yazan (Arabic: يزن or يازن; Persian: يازن or يزن) may refer to:

== People ==
- Dhu Yazan, an ancient Yemeni tribe
  - Saif ibn Dhi Yazan (516–575), semi-legendary king belonging to this tribe
- Saiful Yazan Sulaiman, Malaysian politician
- Yazan Al-Arab (born 1996), Jordanian footballer
- Yazan Al-Bawwab (born 1999), Palestinian swimmer
- Yazan al-Kafarneh (died 2024), Palestinian boy who starved amid the Israeli-imposed famine in Gaza
- Yazan Al-Naimat (born 1999), Jordanian footballer
- Yazan Dahshan (born 1990), Jordanian footballer
- Yazan Halwani (born 1993), Lebanese artist
- Yazan Naim (born 1997), Qatari footballer
- Yazan Thalji (born 1994), Jordanian footballer

== Places ==
- Yazan, Mazandaran, Iran
- Yazan, Qazvin, Iran
