= Tamal (disambiguation) =

Tamal or tamale may refer to:

== Cuisine ==
- Tamale or tamal, a traditional Latin American dish made of masa steamed or boiled in a leaf wrapper
- Hot Tamales, a brand of cinnamon-flavored candy

== People ==
- Tamal, ruler of the Blemmyes c. 400
- Tamáls, self-described term for a portion of the Coastal Miwok people
- Tamal Dey (born 1964), Indian computer scientist and mathematician

== Places ==
- Tamale, Ghana, capital of the Northern region of Ghana
- Tamal, Iran (disambiguation), places in Iran
- Mount Tamalpais, a coastal mountain in Marin County, California

== Other uses ==
- Tamal, common name for Garcinia hanburyi, the Indian gamboge tree
- Tamal, fictional orphan in the film Amphibious
- "Tamale" (song), a song by Tyler, the Creator from the album Wolf
- INS Tamal, a frigate of the Indian Navy

== See also ==
- Tomalley, lobster paste, a soft green substance found in the bellies of lobsters that is considered a delicacy
- Tamil (disambiguation)
