= Dalkhani =

City in Mazandaran province, Iran

Dalkhani Persian: دالخانی
- City
- Location within Iran
- Coordinates: 36°50′00″N 50°44′01″E
- Country: Iran
- Province: Mazandaran
- County: Ramsar
- District: Dalkhani
- Established as a city: 2023

Population (2016)
  - Total: 809
- Time zone: UTC+3:30 (IRST)

Dalkhani (Persian: دالخانی) (Note: Formerly Galesh Mahalleh (گالش محله), also romanized as Gālesh Maḩalleh) is a city in, and the capital of, Dalkhani District in Ramsar County, Mazandaran province, Iran. As a village, it was the capital of Chehel Shahid Rural District until its capital was transferred to the village of Chalakrud.

== Demographics ==
=== Population ===
At the time of the 2006 National Census, the population was 687 in 204 households, when it was the village of Galesh Mahalleh in Chehel Shahid Rural District of the Central District. The following census in 2011 counted 712 people in 237 households. The 2016 census measured the population of the village as 809 people in 278 households.

In 2019, the rural district was separated from the district in the formation of Dalkhani District. Galesh Mahalleh was renamed Dalkhani in 2023 and converted to a city in the same year.
