= Tubon, Ramsar =

Village in Mazandaran province, Iran

Tubon Persian: توبن
- Village
- Location within Iran
- Coordinates: 36°55′51″N 50°37′16″E
- Country: Iran
- Province: Mazandaran
- County: Ramsar
- District: Central
- Rural District: Sakht Sar

Population (2016)
  - Total: 475
- Time zone: UTC+3:30 (IRST)

Tubon (Persian: توبن) (Note: Also romanized as Tūbon) is a village in Sakht Sar Rural District of the Central District in Ramsar County, Mazandaran province, Iran.

== Demographics ==
=== Population ===
At the time of the 2006 National Census, the village's population was 457 in 125 households. The following census in 2011 counted 468 people in 148 households. The 2016 census measured the population of the village as 475 people in 162 households.
