= Tubon =

Tubon may refer to:

- Tubon, Ramsar, a village in Mazandaran province, Iran
- Tubon, Tonekabon, a village in Mazandaran province, Iran
- A tubular electric organ developed in the mid-1960s by Joh Mustad AB in Sweden
