= Tomol, Mazandaran =

Village in Mazandaran province, Iran

Tomol Persian: تمل
- Village
- Location within Iran
- Coordinates: 36°38′39″N 50°25′07″E
- Country: Iran
- Province: Mazandaran
- County: Ramsar
- District: Central
- Rural District: Eshkevar

Population (2016)
  - Total: 189
- Time zone: UTC+3:30 (IRST)

Tomol (Persian: تمل) (Note: Also known as Tomon) is a village in, and the capital of, Eshkevar Rural District in the Central District of Ramsar County, Mazandaran province, Iran.

== Demographics ==
=== Population ===
At the time of the 2006 National Census, the village's population was 245 in 72 households. The following census in 2011 counted 175 people in 62 households. The 2016 census measured the population of the village as 189 people in 71 households.
