= Ch'orti' =

Ch'orti' (or Chorti) may refer to:

- Ch'orti' people - one of the indigenous Maya peoples of southeastern Guatemala and western Honduras
- Ch’orti’ language - a Mayan language, spoken by the Ch'orti' people

== See also ==
- Chorti, Iran
