= Yazan, Mazandaran =

Village in Mazandaran province, Iran

Yazan Persian: يازن
- Village
- Location within Iran
- Coordinates: 36°38′16″N 50°24′29″E
- Country: Iran
- Province: Mazandaran
- County: Ramsar
- District: Central
- Rural District: Eshkevar

Population (2016)
  - Total: 212
- Time zone: UTC+3:30 (IRST)

Yazan (Persian: يازن) (Note: Also romanized as Yāzan) is a village in Eshkevar Rural District of the Central District in Ramsar County, Mazandaran province, Iran.

== Demographics ==
=== Population ===
At the time of the 2006 National Census, the village's population was 275 in 59 households. The following census in 2011 counted 224 people in 60 households. The 2016 census measured the population of the village as 212 people in 66 households, the most populous in its rural district.
