= Hasan Sara =

Hasan Sara (Persian: حسن سرا), also known as Hanak Sara or Hasanak Sara, may refer to:

- Hasan Sara, Gilan
- Hasan Sara, Mazandaran
