= Tamal, Iran =

Tamal or Tomol (Persian: تمل) in Iran may refer to:

- Tamal, Gilan
- Tamal, Kermanshah
- Tomol, Mazandaran
