= Loj, Mazandaran =

Village in Mazandaran province, Iran

Loj Persian: لج
- Village
- Location within Iran
- Coordinates: 36°37′17″N 50°28′06″E
- Country: Iran
- Province: Mazandaran
- County: Ramsar
- District: Central
- Rural District: Eshkevar

Population (2016)
  - Total: 48
- Time zone: UTC+3:30 (IRST)

Loj (Persian: لج) is a village in Eshkevar Rural District of the Central District in Ramsar County, Mazandaran province, Iran.

== Demographics ==
=== Population ===
At the time of the 2006 National Census, the village's population was 68 in 17 households. The following census in 2011 counted 56 people in 14 households. The 2016 census measured the population of the village as 48 people in 17 households.
