= Ketalem and Sadat Shahr =

City in Mazandaran province, Iran

Ketalem and Sadat Shahr Persian: كتالم و سادات شهر
- City
- Location within Iran
- Coordinates: 36°53′21″N 50°41′46″E
- Country: Iran
- Province: Mazandaran
- County: Ramsar
- District: Central

Population (2016)
  - Total: 20,716
- Time zone: UTC+3:30 (IRST)

Ketalem and Sadat Shahr (Persian: كتالم و سادات شهر) (Note: Also romanized as Katālem va Sādāt Shahr and Ketālem va Sādāt Shahr, formerly known as Ketalem and Sadat Mahalleh (كتالم و سادات محله), also romanized as Ketālem va Sādāt Maḩalleh) is a city in the Central District of Ramsar County, Mazandaran province, Iran.

== History ==
The city was formed by the merger of two villages: Ketalem (كتالم) (Note: Also romanized as Ketālem and Katālem) and Sadat Mahalleh (سادات محله). (Note: Also romanized as Sādāt Maḩalleh; also known as Sādāt Maḩalleh-ye Sakht Sar)

== Demographics ==
=== Population ===
At the time of the 2006 National Census, the city's population was 17,900 in 5,234 households. The following census in 2011 counted 18,962 people in 6,043 households. The 2016 census measured the population of the city as 20,716 people in 7,163 households.
