= Jennat Rudbar Rural District =

Rural district in Mazandaran province, Iran

Jennat Rudbar Rural District Persian: دهستان جنت رودبار
- Rural District
- Location within Iran
- Coordinates: 36°45′N 50°33′E
- Country: Iran
- Province: Mazandaran
- County: Ramsar
- District: Dalkhani
- Established: 1990
- Capital: Jennat Rudbar

Population (2016)
  - Total: 551
- Time zone: UTC+3:30 (IRST)

Jennat Rudbar Rural District (Persian: دهستان جنت رودبار) is in Dalkhani District of Ramsar County, Mazandaran province, Iran. Its capital is the village of Jennat Rudbar.

== Demographics ==
=== Population ===
At the time of the 2006 National Census, the rural district's population (as a part of the Central District) was 627 in 261 households. There were 785 inhabitants in 294 households at the following census of 2011. The 2016 census measured the population of the rural district as 551 in 247 households. The most populous of its 46 villages was Jennat Rudbar, with 174 people.

In 2019, the rural district was separated from the district in the formation of Dalkhani District.

=== Other villages in the rural district ===
- Aghuz Koti
- Armu
- Churteh
- Darreh Dom
- Deraz Zamin
- Ekra Sar
- Garikesh
- Garkesh
- Gelin
- Izki
- Kord Kheyl
- Ligah
- Limakadeh
- Namak Darreh
- Palhamjan
- Sedeh
- Sormoshk
- Talich Kuh
- Zaru Sara
