= Eshkevar Rural District =

Rural district in Mazandaran province, Iran

Eshkevar Rural District Persian: دهستان اشكور
- Rural District
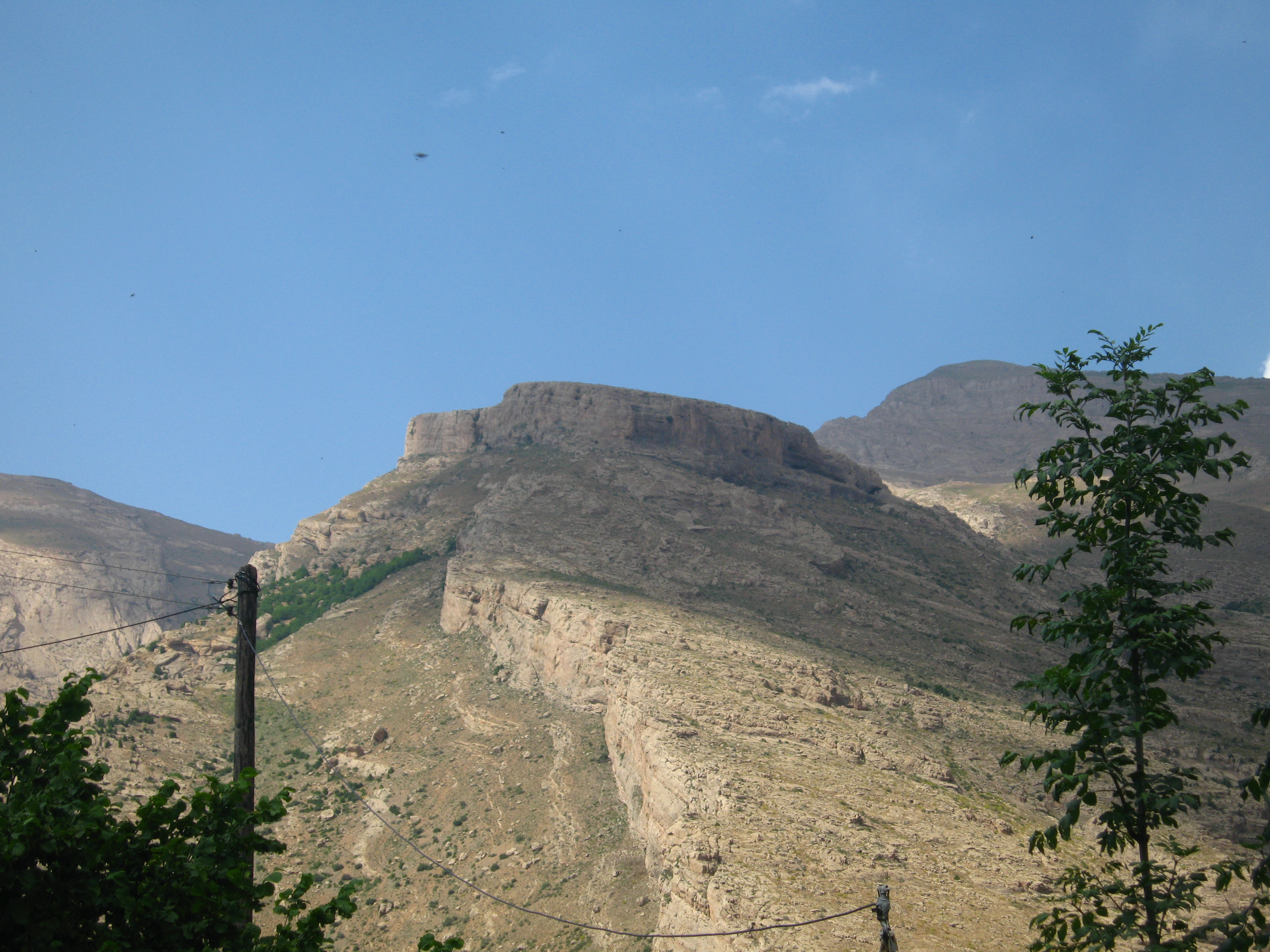
- Landscape in Eshkevar Rural District

- Location within Iran
- Coordinates: 36°38′N 50°28′E
- Country: Iran
- Province: Mazandaran
- County: Ramsar
- District: Central
- Established: 1993
- Capital: Tomol

Population (2016)
  - Total: 991
- Time zone: UTC+3:30 (IRST)

Eshkevar Rural District (Persian: دهستان اشكور) is in the Central District of Ramsar County, Mazandaran province, Iran. Its capital is the village of Tomol.

== Demographics ==
=== Population ===
At the time of the 2006 National Census, the rural district's population was 1,600 in 428 households. There were 1,246 inhabitants in 387 households at the following census of 2011. The 2016 census measured the population of the rural district as 991 in 347 households. The most populous of its 12 villages was Yazan, with 212 people.

=== Other villages in the rural district ===
- Akaneh
- Eyfi
- Kalayeh
- Kit
- Loj
- Mij
- Nadak
- Narneh
- Separ Deh
