= LAJ =

LAJ may refer to:

- British Mediterranean Airways; ICAO airline code LAJ
- La Junta (Amtrak station), Colorado, United States; Amtrak station code LAJ
- Lages Airport, Santa Catarina, Brazil; IATA airport code LAJ
- Lango language (Uganda), ISO 639-3 language code LAJ
- Libyan Arab Jamahiriya
- Los Angeles Junction Railway
