= Shad Morad Mahalleh, Kelachay =

Shad Morad Mahalleh شادمرادمحله
- Village
- Location within Iran
- Coordinates: 37°04′02″N 50°20′35″E
- Country: Iran
- Province: Gilan
- County: Rudsar
- Bakhsh: Kelachay
- Rural District: Machian

Population (2006)
  - Total: 122
- Time zone: UTC+3:30 (IRST)
  - Summer (DST): UTC+4:30 (IRDT)

Shad Morad Mahalleh (Persian: شادمرادمحله, also Romanized as Shād Morād Maḩalleh; also known as Shāh Morād Maḩalleh) is a village in Machian Rural District, Kelachay District, Rudsar County, Gilan Province, Iran. At the 2006 census, its population was 122, in 37 families.
