= Ləj =

- Municipality
- Location within Azerbaijan
- Coordinates: 38°45′34″N 48°47′33″E
- Country: Azerbaijan
- Rayon: Lankaran

Population
  - Total: 1,596
- Time zone: UTC+4 (AZT)
  - Summer (DST): UTC+5 (AZT)

Ləj (also known as Lazh and Lyazh) is a village and municipality in the Lankaran Rayon of Azerbaijan. It has a population of 1,596.

== Notable natives ==
- Asker Aliev— National Hero of Azerbaijan.
