= Laj, West Azerbaijan =

Village in West Azerbaijan province, Iran

Laj Persian: لج
- Village
- Location within Iran
- Coordinates: 36°54′10″N 45°45′58″E
- Country: Iran
- Province: West Azerbaijan
- County: Mahabad
- District: Central
- Rural District: Mokriyan-e Sharqi

Population (2016)
  - Total: 1,390
- Time zone: UTC+3:30 (IRST)

Laj (Persian: لج) (Note: Also romanized as Lej; also known as Liadzh, Liaj, and Līj; in Armenian: Լաճ) is a village in Mokriyan-e Sharqi Rural District of the Central District in Mahabad County, West Azerbaijan province, Iran.

== Demographics ==
=== Population ===
At the time of the 2006 National Census, the village's population was 1,297 in 237 households. The following census in 2011 counted 1,377 people in 369 households. The 2016 census measured the population of the village as 1,390 people in 328 households.
