= Sakht Sar Rural District =

Rural district in Mazandaran province, Iran

Sakht Sar Rural District Persian: دهستان سخت‌سر
- Rural District
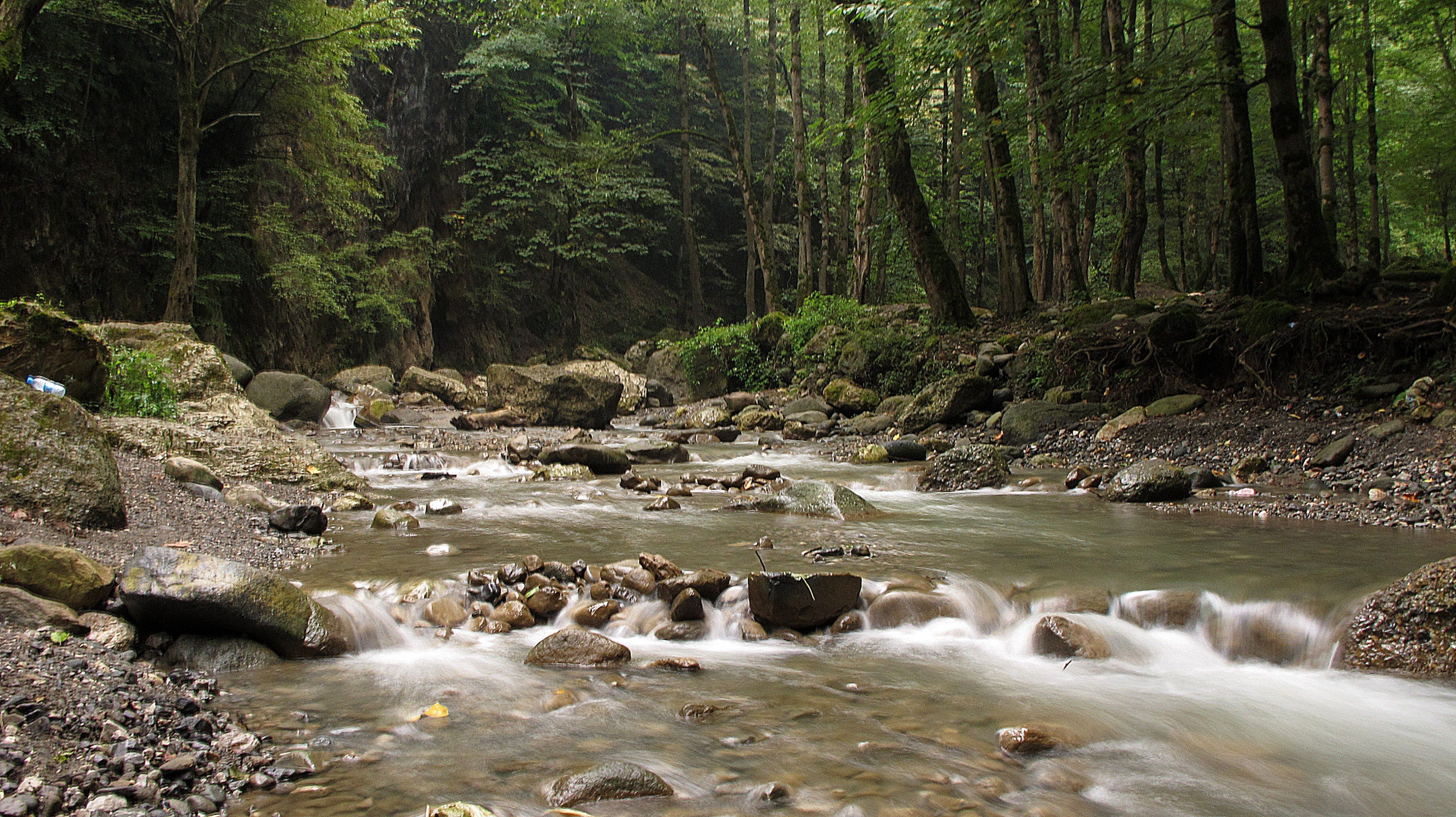
- Landscape along the Safarud River

- Location within Iran
- Coordinates: 36°53′N 50°35′E
- Country: Iran
- Province: Mazandaran
- County: Ramsar
- District: Central
- Established: 1987
- Capital: Ramsar

Population (2016)
  - Total: 6,462
- Time zone: UTC+3:30 (IRST)

Sakht Sar Rural District (Persian: دهستان سخت‌سر) is in the Central District of Ramsar County, Mazandaran province, Iran. It is administered from the city of Ramsar. (Note: Formerly Sakht Sar)

== Demographics ==
=== Population ===
At the time of the 2006 National Census, the rural district's population was 6,305 in 1,795 households. There were 6,169 inhabitants in 1,950 households at the following census of 2011. The 2016 census measured the population of the rural district as 6,462 in 2,174 households. The most populous of its 95 villages was Talesh Mahalleh-ye Fatuk, with 1,106 people.

=== Other villages in the rural district ===
- Astal Kenar
- Darya Poshteh
- Gavramak
- Kalij Kuh
- Lapa Sarak
- Mian Lat
- Sefid Tameshk
- Shad Mansur Mahalleh
- Siasan
- Tang Darreh-ye Gharbi
- Tazeh Patak
- Tubon
