= Chehel Shahid Rural District =

Rural district in Mazandaran province, Iran

Chehel Shahid Rural District Persian: دهستان چهل شهيد
- Rural District
- Location within Iran
- Coordinates: 36°50′N 50°43′E
- Country: Iran
- Province: Mazandaran
- County: Ramsar
- District: Dalkhani
- Established: 1987
- Capital: Chalakrud

Population (2016)
  - Total: 9,462
- Time zone: UTC+3:30 (IRST)

Chehel Shahid Rural District (Persian: دهستان چهل شهيد) is in Dalkhani District of Ramsar County, Mazandaran province, Iran. Its capital is the village of Chalakrud. The previous capital of the rural district was the village of Galesh Mahalleh, now the city of Dalkhani.

== Demographics ==
=== Population ===
At the time of the 2006 National Census, the rural district's population (as a part of the Central District) was 9,584 in 2,707 households. There were 8,867 inhabitants in 2,800 households at the following census of 2011. The 2016 census measured the population of the rural district as 9,462 in 3,228 households. The most populous of its 52 villages was Kalayeh Bon, with 1,409 people.

In 2019, the rural district was separated from the district in the formation of Dalkhani District.

=== Other villages in the rural district ===
- Asiab Sar
- Basl Kuh
- Latar
- Limak
- Rajub
- Shad Morad Mahalleh
- Shasta
