= Dalkhani District =

District in Mazandaran province, Iran

Dalkhani District Persian: بخش دالخانی
- District
- Location within Iran
- Coordinates: 36°46′N 50°36′E
- Country: Iran
- Province: Mazandaran
- County: Ramsar
- Established: 2019
- Capital: Dalkhani
- Time zone: UTC+3:30 (IRST)

Dalkhani District (Persian: بخش دالخانی) is in Ramsar County, Mazandaran province, Iran. Its capital is the city of Dalkhani, (Note: Formerly the village of Galesh Mahalleh) whose population at the time of the 2016 National Census was 809 people in 278 households.

== History ==
In 2019, Chehel Shahid and Jennat Rudbar Rural Districts were separated from the Central District in the formation of Dalkhani District. The village of Dalkhani was converted to a city in 2023.

== Demographics ==
=== Administrative divisions ===
Dalkhani District
Administrative Divisions
Chehel Shahid RD
Jennat Rudbar RD
Dalkhani (city) (Note: Became a city after the 2016 census)
RD = Rural District
