= Central District (Ramsar County) =

District in Mazandaran province, Iran

Central District (Ramsar County) Persian: بخش مرکزی شهرستان رامسر
- District
- Location within Iran
- Coordinates: 36°45′N 50°33′E
- Country: Iran
- Province: Mazandaran
- County: Ramsar
- Capital: Ramsar

Population (2016)
  - Total: 74,179
- Time zone: UTC+3:30 (IRST)

The Central District of Ramsar County (Persian: بخش مرکزی شهرستان رامسر) is in Mazandaran province, Iran. Its capital is the city of Ramsar.

== History ==
In 2019, Chehel Shahid and Jennat Rudbar Rural Districts were separated from the district in the formation of Dalkhani District.

== Demographics ==
=== Population ===
At the time of the 2006 National Census, the district's population was 67,675 in 19,666 households. The following census in 2011 counted 68,323 people in 21,889 households. The 2016 census measured the population of the district as 74,179 inhabitants in 25,312 households.

=== Administrative divisions ===
Central District (Ramsar County) Population
Administrative Divisions	2006	2011	2016
Chehel Shahid RD (Note: Transferred to Dalkhani District after the 2016 census)	9,584	8,867	9,462
Eshkevar RD	1,600	1,246	991
Jennat Rudbar RD	627	785	551
Sakht Sar RD	6,305	6,169	6,462
Ketalem and Sadat Shahr (city)	17,900	18,962	20,716
Ramsar (city)	31,659	32,294	35,997
Total	67,675	68,323	74,179
RD = Rural District
