= Ramsar County =

County in Mazandaran province, Iran

Ramsar County Persian: شهرستان رامسر
- County
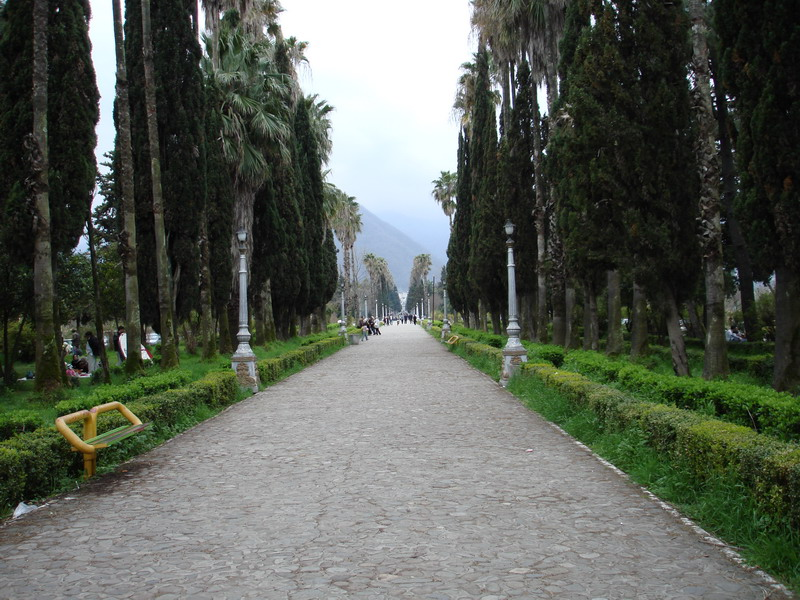
- The Old Hotel

- Location of Ramsar County in Mazandaran province (left, purple)

- Location of Mazandaran province in Iran
- Coordinates: 36°45′N 50°34′E
- Country: Iran
- Province: Mazandaran
- Capital: Ramsar
- Districts: Central, Dalkhani

Area
  - Total: 729.80 km^{2} (281.78 sq mi)

Population (2016)
  - Total: 74,179
  - Density: 101.64/km^{2} (263.25/sq mi)
- Time zone: UTC+3:30 (IRST)

Ramsar County (Persian: شهرستان رامسر) is in Mazandaran province, Iran. Its capital is the city of Ramsar.

== History ==
In 2019, Chehel Shahid and Jennat Rudbar Rural Districts were separated from the Central District in the formation of Dalkhani District. The village of Dalkhani was converted to a city in 2023.

== Demographics ==
=== Population ===
At the time of the 2006 National Census, the county's population was 67,675 in 19,666 households. The following census in 2011 counted 68,323 people in 21,889 households. The 2016 census measured the population of the county as 74,179 in 25,312 households.

=== Administrative divisions ===
Ramsar County's population history and administrative structure over three consecutive censuses are shown in the following table.

Ramsar County Population
Administrative Divisions	2006	2011	2016
Central District	67,675	68,323	74,179
Chehel Shahid RD	9,584	8,867	9,462
Eshkevar RD	1,600	1,246	991
Jennat Rudbar RD	627	785	551
Sakht Sar RD	6,305	6,169	6,462
Ketalem and Sadat Shahr (city)	17,900	18,962	20,716
Ramsar (city)	31,659	32,294	35,997
Dalkhani District (Note: Established after the 2016 census)			
Chehel Shahid RD			
Jennat Rudbar RD			
Dalkhani (city) (Note: Formerly the village of Galesh Mahalleh) (Note: Became a city after the 2016 census)			
Total	67,675	68,323	74,179
RD = Rural District

== See also ==
Media related to Ramsar County at Wikimedia Commons
