= Gava =

Gava may refer to:

== Places ==
- Gavà, a town in Catalonia, Spain
- Gávavencsellő, also known as Gava, a town in Hungary

=== Iran ===
- Gava, a historic/mythological toponym for Sogdia
- Bala Gava Sara, a village in Chini Jan Rural District, Gilan Province
- Pain Gava Sara, a village in Chini Jan Rural District, Gilan Province
- Gava Sara-ye Olya, a village in Chini Jan Rural District, Gilan Province

=== Kyrgyzstan ===
- Uzbek-Gava (or Kaba), a village in Jalal-Abad Region
- Kirgizgava, a village in Jalal-Abad Region

== People ==
- Gava (surname)

== Other uses ==
- Aamhi Jato Amuchya Gava, a Marathi language film directed by Kamlakar Torne in 1968
- Gáva-Holigrady culture, a late Bronze Age culture of Eastern Slovakia, Western Ukraine, Northwestern Romania and Hungary
- Guduf-Gava language (also known as Gudupe, Afkabiye), an Afro-Asiatic language spoken in Borno State, Nigeria
- Gavà Mines, also known as Can Tintorer Mines, a pre-historic (Neolithic) archaeological site in the municipality of Gavà, Spain

== See also ==
- Cava (disambiguation)
