= Gava Sara =

Gava Sara (Persian: گواسرا) may refer to:

- Bala Gava Sara
- Gava Sara-ye Olya
- Pain Gava Sara
