= Chafjir =

Chafjir چافجير
- Neighborhood
- Location within Iran
- Coordinates: 37°09′30″N 50°16′35″E
- Country: Iran
- Province: Gilan
- County: Rudsar
- Bakhsh: Central
- City: Rudsar

Population (2006)
  - Total: 1,379
- Time zone: UTC+3:30 (IRST)

Chafjir (Persian: چافجير, also Romanized as Chāfjīr) is suburb of the city of Rudsar in Gilan Province, Iran.

Formerly it was a village in Chini Jan Rural District, in the Central District of Rudsar County. At the 2006 census, its population was 1,379, in 407 families.
