= Reza Mahalleh =

Reza Mahalleh (Persian: رضامحله) may refer to:

- Reza Mahalleh, Rudsar, Gilan Province
- Reza Mahalleh, Kelachay, Rudsar County, Gilan Province
- Reza Mahalleh, Mazandaran
- Reza Mahalleh Rural District, in Gilan Province
