= Pas Chavar =

Pas Chavar پس چور
- Village
- Location within Iran
- Coordinates: 37°02′18″N 50°17′49″E
- Country: Iran
- Province: Gilan
- County: Rudsar
- Bakhsh: Central
- Rural District: Reza Mahalleh

Population (2006)
  - Total: 68
- Time zone: UTC+3:30 (IRST)
  - Summer (DST): UTC+4:30 (IRDT)

Pas Chavar (Persian: پس چور) is a village in Reza Mahalleh Rural District, in the Central District of Rudsar County, Gilan Province, Iran. At the 2006 census, its population was 68, in 23 families.
