= Lashkajan =

Lashkajan or Lashka Jan (Persian: لشكاجان) may refer to:

- Lashkajan-e Olya
- Lashkajan-e Sofla
