= Khalifeh Mahalleh =

Coordinates: 37.0000°N 50.0000°E

Khalifeh Mahalleh خليفه محله
- village
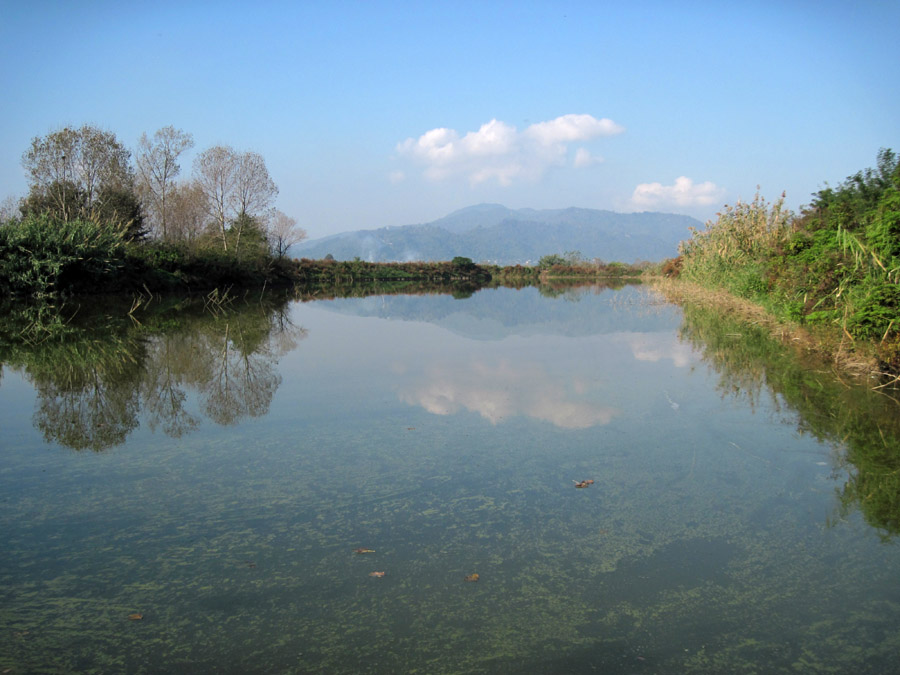
- A pond near Khalifeh Mahalleh
- Interactive map of Khalifeh Mahalleh
- Country: Iran
- Province: Gilan
- County: Rudsar
- Bakhsh: Central
- Rural District: Chini Jan

Population (2006)
  - Total: 290
- Time zone: UTC+3:30 (IRST)

Khalifeh Mahalleh (Persian: خليفه محله, also Romanized as Khalīfeh Maḩalleh) is a village in Chini Jan Rural District, in the Central District of Rudsar County, Gilan Province, Iran. At the 2006 census, its population was 233, in 105 families. Down from 290 in 2006. Davoud Khani (Persian: داوود خانی لنگرودی, is a Persian poet from this village.
