= Valiseh =

Valiseh وليسه
- Village
- Location within Iran
- Coordinates: 37°09′14″N 50°14′20″E
- Country: Iran
- Province: Gilan
- County: Rudsar
- Bakhsh: Central
- Rural District: Chini Jan

Population (2006)
  - Total: 275
- Time zone: UTC+3:30 (IRST)
  - Summer (DST): UTC+4:30 (IRDT)

Valiseh (Persian: وليسه, also Romanized as Valīseh) is a village in Chini Jan Rural District, in the Central District of Rudsar County, Gilan Province, Iran. At the 2006 census, its population was 275, in 85 families.
