= Kuyeh =

Kuyeh (Persian: كويه) may refer to:

- Kuyeh-ye Olya
- Kuyeh-ye Sofla
- Chinese postal romanization of Guye District, Tangshan, Hebei, China
