= Chavar Kalayeh =

Chavar Kalayeh (Persian: چوركلايه) may refer to:

- Chavar Kalayeh, Rudsar
- Chavar Kalayeh (37°06′ N 50°18′ E), Rudsar
