= Afermejan =

Afermejan (Persian: افرمجان) may refer to:

- Afermejan-e Olya
- Afermejan-e Sofla
