= Kaldarreh =

Kaldarreh (Persian: كلدره) may refer to:

- Kaldarreh-ye Olya
- Kaldarreh-ye Sofla
