= Davi Sara =

Davi Sara دعوی‌سرا
- Village
- Location within Iran
- Coordinates: 37°05′09″N 50°21′27″E
- Country: Iran
- Province: Gilan
- County: Rudsar
- Bakhsh: Central
- Rural District: Reza Mahalleh

Population (2006)
  - Total: 204
- Time zone: UTC+3:30 (IRST)
  - Summer (DST): UTC+4:30 (IRDT)

Davi Sara (Persian: دعوی‌سرا, also Romanized as Da‘vī Sarā; also known as Da‘vá Sarā) is a village in Reza Mahalleh Rural District, in the Central District of Rudsar County, Gilan Province, Iran. At the 2006 census, its population was 204, in 63 families.

Former Iranian Cleric & Politician Mohammad Mohammadi Gilani is from here.
