= Tut Kaleh =

Tut Kaleh (Persian: توتكله), also rendered as Tut Kala, may refer to:

- Tut Kaleh-ye Olya
- Tut Kaleh-ye Sofla
