= Rowshanabsar =

Rowshanabsar (Persian: روشن ابسر) may refer to:

- Rowshanabsar-e Bala
- Rowshanabsar-e Pain
