= Lashkajan-e Olya =

Lashkajan-e Olya لشكاجان عليا
- Village
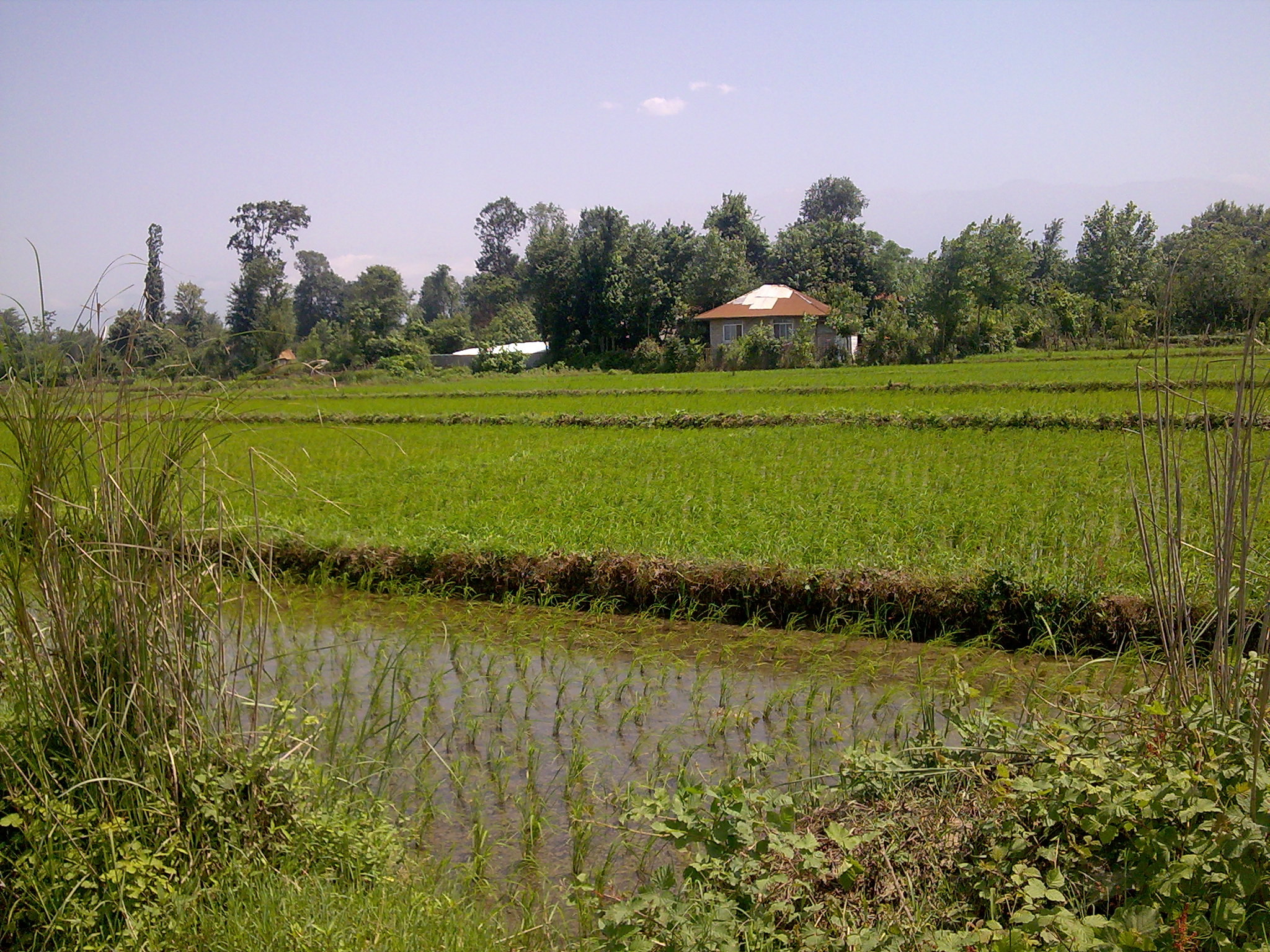

- Location within Iran
- Coordinates: 37°05′33″N 50°17′12″E
- Country: Iran
- Province: Gilan
- County: Rudsar
- Bakhsh: Central
- Rural District: Reza Mahalleh

Population (2006)
  - Total: 323
- Time zone: UTC+3:30 (IRST)

Lashkajan-e Olya (Persian: لشكاجان عليا, also Romanized as Lashkājān-e ‘Olyā; also known as Lashkājān and Lashkājān-e Bālā) is a village in Reza Mahalleh Rural District, in the Central District of Rudsar County, Gilan Province, Iran. At the 2016 census, its population was 290, in 109 families. Down from 323 in 2006.
