= Tut Kaleh-ye Olya =

Tut Kaleh-ye Olya توتكله عليا
- Village
- Location within Iran
- Coordinates: 37°03′32″N 50°16′05″E
- Country: Iran
- Province: Gilan
- County: Rudsar
- Bakhsh: Central
- Rural District: Reza Mahalleh

Population (2006)
  - Total: 180
- Time zone: UTC+3:30 (IRST)
  - Summer (DST): UTC+4:30 (IRDT)

Tut Kaleh-ye Olya (Persian: توتكله عليا, also Romanized as Tūt Kaleh-ye ‘Olyā; also known as Tūt Kalā and Tūt Kalā-ye ‘Olyā) is a village in Reza Mahalleh Rural District, in the Central District of Rudsar County, Gilan Province, Iran. At the 2006 census, its population was 180, in 54 families.
