= Tut Kaleh-ye Sofla =

Tut Kaleh-ye Sofla توتكله سفلي
- Village
- Location within Iran
- Coordinates: 37°03′45″N 50°17′58″E
- Country: Iran
- Province: Gilan
- County: Rudsar
- Bakhsh: Central
- Rural District: Reza Mahalleh

Population (2006)
  - Total: 180
- Time zone: UTC+3:30 (IRST)
  - Summer (DST): UTC+4:30 (IRDT)

Tut Kaleh-ye Sofla (Persian: توتكله سفلي, also Romanized as Tūt Kaleh-ye Soflá; also known as Tūt Kalā-ye Soflá) is a village in Reza Mahalleh Rural District, in the Central District of Rudsar County, Gilan Province, Iran. At the 2006 census, its population was 180, in 54 families.
