= Naser Sara =

Village in Gilan province, Iran

Naser Sara Persian: ناصرسرا
- Village
- Location within Iran
- Coordinates: 37°06′33″N 50°15′53″E
- Country: Iran
- Province: Gilan
- County: Rudsar
- District: Central
- Rural District: Chini Jan

Population (2016)
  - Total: 994
- Time zone: UTC+3:30 (IRST)

Naser Sara (Persian: ناصرسرا) (Note: Also romanized as Nāşer Sarā) is a village in Chini Jan Rural District of the Central District in Rudsar County, Gilan province, Iran.

== Demographics ==
=== Population ===
At the time of the 2006 National Census, the village's population was 1,009 in 305 households. The following census in 2011 counted 1,055 people in 351 households. The 2016 census measured the population of the village as 994 people in 374 households.
