= Lehdarbon =

Village in Gilan province, Iran

Lehdarbon Persian: لهداربن
- Village
- Location within Iran
- Coordinates: 37°09′34″N 50°15′53″E
- Country: Iran
- Province: Gilan
- County: Rudsar
- District: Central
- Rural District: Chini Jan

Population (2016)
  - Total: 451
- Time zone: UTC+3:30 (IRST)

Lehdarbon (Persian: لهداربن) (Note: Also romanized as Lehdārbon) is a village in Chini Jan Rural District of the Central District in Rudsar County, Gilan province, Iran.

== Demographics ==
=== Population ===
At the time of the 2006 National Census, the village's population was 458 in 139 households. The following census in 2011 counted 429 people in 149 households. The 2016 census measured the population of the village as 451 people in 171 households.
