= Kolka Sara =

Village in Gilan province, Iran

Kolka Sara Persian: کلکاسرا
- Village
- Location within Iran
- Coordinates: 37°07′46″N 50°15′58″E
- Country: Iran
- Province: Gilan
- County: Rudsar
- District: Central
- Rural District: Chini Jan

Population (2016)
  - Total: 1,118
- Time zone: UTC+3:30 (IRST)

Kolka Sara (Persian: کلکاسرا) (Note: Also romanized as Kolkā Sarā; also known as Olkā Sarā) is a village in Chini Jan Rural District of the Central District in Rudsar County, Gilan province, Iran.

== Demographics ==
=== Population ===
At the time of the 2006 National Census, the village's population was 1,067 in 305 households. The following census in 2011 counted 1,138 people in 368 households. The 2016 census measured the population of the village as 1,118 people in 385 households.
