= Garmejan =

Village in Gilan province, Iran

Garmejan Persian: گرمجان
- Village
- Location within Iran
- Coordinates: 37°06′18″N 50°17′43″E
- Country: Iran
- Province: Gilan
- County: Rudsar
- District: Central
- Rural District: Reza Mahalleh

Population (2016)
  - Total: 591
- Time zone: UTC+3:30 (IRST)

Garmejan (Persian: گرمجان) (Note: Also romanized as Garmejān) a village in Reza Mahalleh Rural District of the Central District in Rudsar County, Gilan province, Iran.

== Demographics ==
=== Population ===
At the time of the 2006 National Census, the village's population was 620 in 183 households. The following census in 2011 counted 619 people in 202 households. The 2016 census measured the population of the village as 591 people in 210 households.
