= Kurcheh Posht =

Village in Gilan province, Iran

Kurcheh Posht Persian: كورچه پشت
- Village
- Location within Iran
- Coordinates: 37°06′56″N 50°17′21″E
- Country: Iran
- Province: Gilan
- County: Rudsar
- District: Central
- Rural District: Reza Mahalleh

Population (2016)
  - Total: 800
- Time zone: UTC+3:30 (IRST)

Kurcheh Posht (Persian: كورچه پشت) (Note: Also romanized as Kūrcheh Posht; also known as Gowrjeh Posht, Korjā Posht, Korjā-ye Posht, Korjehposht, and Kvorjeh Posht) is a village in Reza Mahalleh Rural District of the Central District in Rudsar County, Gilan province, Iran.

== Demographics ==
=== Population ===
At the time of the 2006 National Census, the village's population was 842 in 233 households. The following census in 2011 counted 889 people in 280 households. The 2016 census measured the population of the village as 800 people in 286 households. It was the most populous village in its rural district.
