= Ali Kalayeh =

Village in Gilan province, Iran

Ali Kalayeh Persian: علي كلايه
- Village
- Location within Iran
- Coordinates: 37°04′38″N 50°16′21″E
- Country: Iran
- Province: Gilan
- County: Rudsar
- District: Central
- Rural District: Reza Mahalleh

Population (2016)
  - Total: 337
- Time zone: UTC+3:30 (IRST)

Ali Kalayeh (Persian: علي كلايه) (Note: Also romanized as ‘Alī Kalāyeh) a village in Reza Mahalleh Rural District of the Central District in Rudsar County, Gilan province, Iran.

== Demographics ==
=== Population ===
At the time of the 2006 National Census, the village's population was 399 in 127 households. The following census in 2011 counted 407 people in 149 households. The 2016 census measured the population of the village as 337 people in 141 households.
