= Hasanak Sara, Iran =

Village in Gilan province, Iran

Hasanak Sara Persian: حسنک سرا
- Village
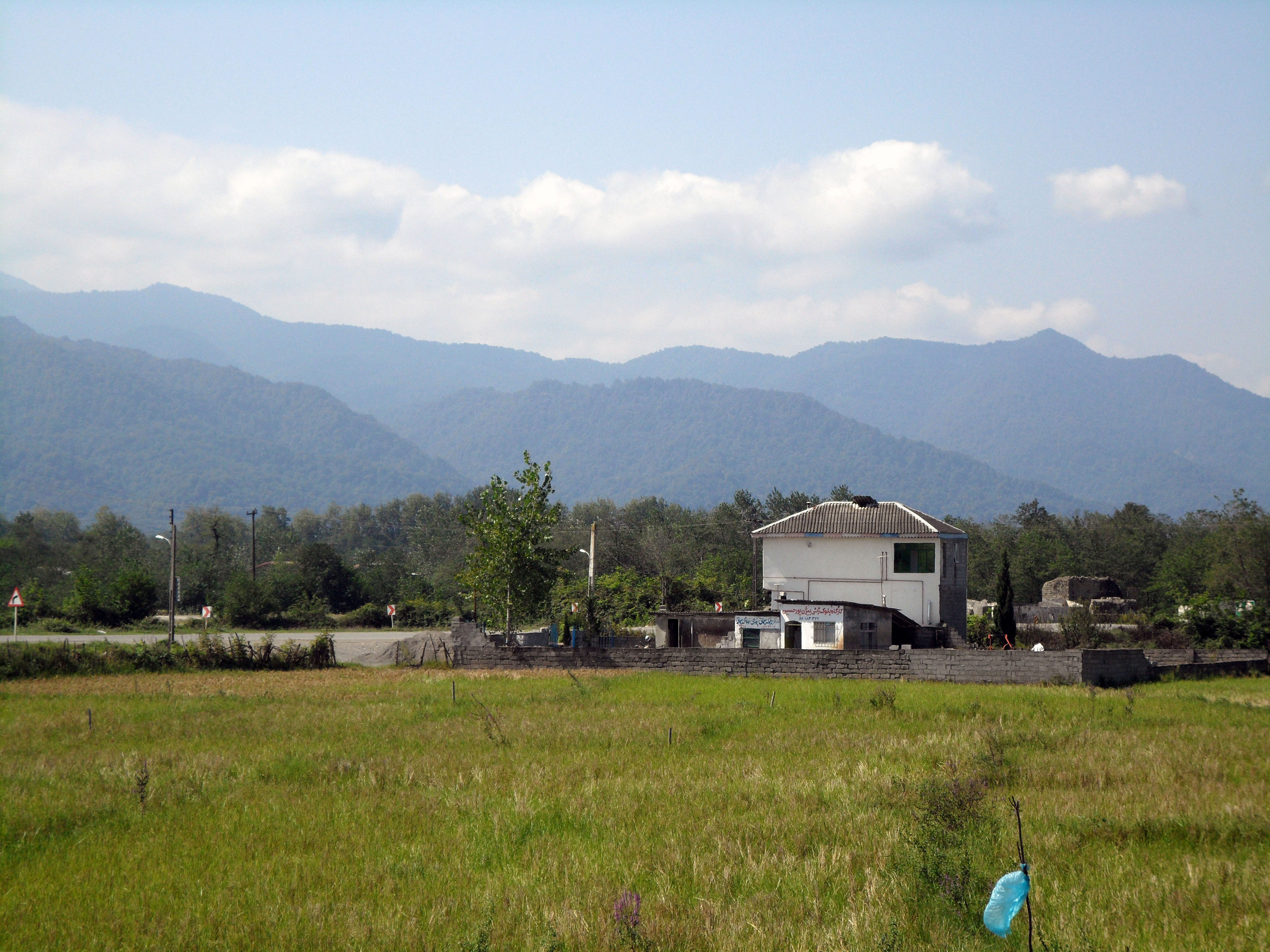
- The village of Hasanak Sara

- Location within Iran
- Coordinates: 37°06′25″N 50°21′03″E
- Country: Iran
- Province: Gilan
- County: Rudsar
- District: Central
- Rural District: Reza Mahalleh

Population (2016)
  - Total: 622
- Time zone: UTC+3:30 (IRST)

Hasanak Sara (Persian: حسنک سرا) (Note: Also romanized as Ḩasanak Sarā; formerly known as Hasan Sara (حسن سرا), also romanized as Ḩasan Sarā; also known as Ḩanak Sarā) a village in Reza Mahalleh Rural District of the Central District in Rudsar County, Gilan province, Iran.

== Demographics ==
=== Population ===
At the time of the 2006 National Census, the village's population, as Hasan Sara, was 796 in 220 households. The following census in 2011 counted 719 people in 233 households, by which time the village was listed as Hasanak Sara. The 2016 census measured the population of the village as 622 people in 226 households.
