= Rowshanabsar-e Pain =

Rowshanabsar-e Pain روشن ابسرپائين
- Village
- Location within Iran
- Coordinates: 37°03′21″N 50°17′44″E
- Country: Iran
- Province: Gilan
- County: Rudsar
- Bakhsh: Central
- Rural District: Reza Mahalleh

Population (2006)
  - Total: 47
- Time zone: UTC+3:30 (IRST)
  - Summer (DST): UTC+4:30 (IRDT)

Rowshanabsar-e Pain (Persian: روشن ابسرپائين, also Romanized as Rowshanābsar-e Pā’īn; also known as Rowshanābsar) is a village in Reza Mahalleh Rural District, in the Central District of Rudsar County, Gilan Province, Iran. At the 2006 census, its population was 47, in 15 families.
