= Kuyeh-ye Olya =

Kuyeh-ye Olya كويه عليا
- Village
- Location within Iran
- Coordinates: 37°05′30″N 50°13′50″E
- Country: Iran
- Province: Gilan
- County: Rudsar
- Bakhsh: Central
- Rural District: Reza Mahalleh

Population (2006)
  - Total: 295
- Time zone: UTC+3:30 (IRST)
  - Summer (DST): UTC+4:30 (IRDT)

Kuyeh-ye Olya (Persian: كويه عليا, also Romanized as Kūyeh-ye ‘Olyā) is a village in Reza Mahalleh Rural District, in the Central District of Rudsar County, Gilan Province, Iran. At the 2006 census, its population was 295, in 104 families.
