= Gilakajan =

Village in Gilan province, Iran

Gilakajan Persian: گيلاكجان
- Village
- Location within Iran
- Coordinates: 37°05′35″N 50°21′22″E
- Country: Iran
- Province: Gilan
- County: Rudsar
- District: Central
- Rural District: Reza Mahalleh

Population (2016)
  - Total: 630
- Time zone: UTC+3:30 (IRST)

Gilakajan (Persian: گيلاكجان) (Note: Also romanized as Gīlākajān and Gīlākjān) a village in Reza Mahalleh Rural District of the Central District in Rudsar County, Gilan province, Iran.

== Demographics ==
=== Population ===
At the time of the 2006 National Census, the village's population was 720 in 226 households. The following census in 2011 counted 686 people in 227 households. The 2016 census measured the population of the village as 630 people in 233 households.
