= Kishakajan =

Village in Gilan province, Iran

Kishakajan Persian: كيشاكجان
- Village
- Location within Iran
- Coordinates: 37°07′37″N 50°16′24″E
- Country: Iran
- Province: Gilan
- County: Rudsar
- District: Central
- Rural District: Chini Jan

Population (2016)
  - Total: 836
- Time zone: UTC+3:30 (IRST)

Kishakajan (Persian: كيشاكجان) (Note: Also romanized as Kīshākajān) is a village in Chini Jan Rural District of the Central District in Rudsar County, Gilan province, Iran.

== Demographics ==
=== Population ===
At the time of the 2006 National Census, the village's population was 772 in 220 households. The following census in 2011 counted 791 people in 262 households. The 2016 census measured the population of the village as 836 people in 317 households.
