= Chavar Kalayeh (37°06′ N 50°18′ E), Rudsar =

Chavar Kalayeh چوركلايه
- Village
- Location within Iran
- Coordinates: 37°06′16″N 50°18′16″E
- Country: Iran
- Province: Gilan
- County: Rudsar
- Bakhsh: Central
- Rural District: Reza Mahalleh

Population (2006)
  - Total: 89
- Time zone: UTC+3:30 (IRST)
  - Summer (DST): UTC+4:30 (IRDT)

Chavar Kalayeh (Persian: چوركلايه, also Romanized as Chavar Kalāyeh; also known as Chāpār Kalāyeh) is a village in Reza Mahalleh Rural District, in the Central District of Rudsar County, Gilan Province, Iran. At the 2006 census, its population was 89, in 25 families.
