= Tamijan =

Village in Gilan province, Iran

Tamijan Persian: تميجان
- Village
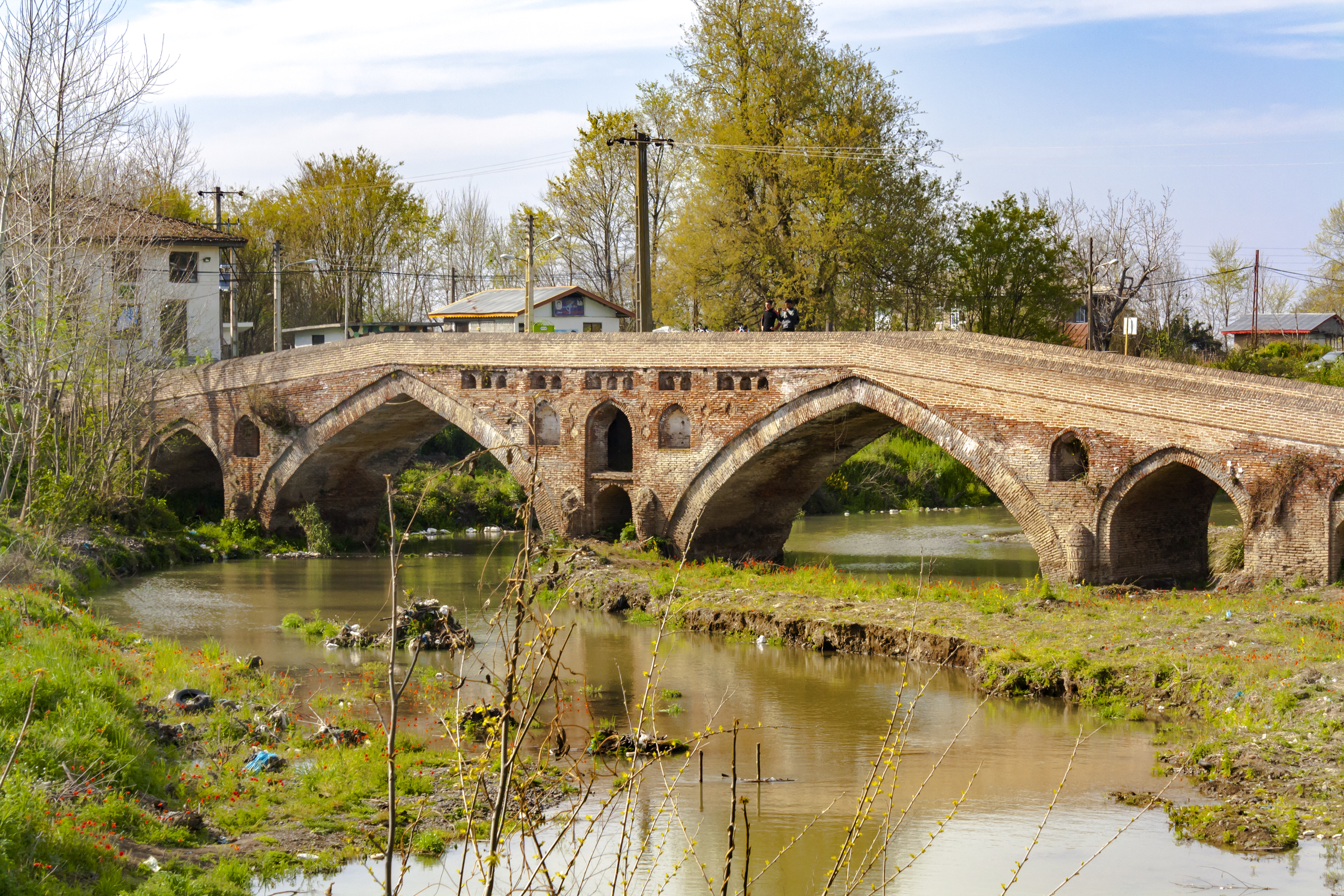
- Tamijan Bridge

- Location within Iran
- Coordinates: 37°07′23″N 50°15′10″E
- Country: Iran
- Province: Gilan
- County: Rudsar
- District: Central
- Rural District: Chini Jan

Population (2016)
  - Total: 466
- Time zone: UTC+3:30 (IRST)

Tamijan (Persian: تميجان) (Note: Also romanized as Tamījān) is a village in Chini Jan Rural District of the Central District in Rudsar County, Gilan province, Iran.

== Demographics ==
=== Population ===
At the time of the 2006 National Census, the village's population was 563 in 161 households. The following census in 2011 counted 493 people in 155 households. The 2016 census measured the population of the village as 466 people in 175 households.
