= Chini Jan =

Village in Gilan province, Iran

Chini Jan Persian: چینی جان
- Village
- Location within Iran
- Coordinates: 37°08′59″N 50°15′19″E
- Country: Iran
- Province: Gilan
- County: Rudsar
- District: Central
- Rural District: Chini Jan

Population (2016)
  - Total: 1,311
- Time zone: UTC+3:30 (IRST)

Chini Jan (Persian: چینی جان) (Note: Also romanized as Chīnī Jān; also known as Chīnjān) is a village in, and the capital of, Chini Jan Rural District in the Central District of Rudsar County, Gilan province, Iran.

== Demographics ==
=== Population ===
At the time of the 2006 National Census, the village's population was 1,649 in 462 households. The following census in 2011 counted 1,580 people in 497 households. The 2016 census measured the population of the village as 1,311 people in 481 households.
