= Ahmadabad, Gilan =

Village in Gilan province, Iran

Ahmadabad Persian: احمدآباد
- Village
- Location within Iran
- Coordinates: 37°09′14″N 50°16′54″E
- Country: Iran
- Province: Gilan
- County: Rudsar
- District: Central
- Rural District: Chini Jan

Population (2016)
  - Total: 1,454
- Time zone: UTC+3:30 (IRST)

Ahmadabad (Persian: احمدآباد) (Note: Also romanized as Aḩmadābād) is a village in Chini Jan Rural District of the Central District in Rudsar County, Gilan province, Iran.

== Demographics ==
=== Population ===
At the time of the 2006 National Census, the village's population was 2,024 in 544 households. The following census in 2011 counted 779 people in 233 households. The 2016 census measured the population of the village as 1,454 people in 473 households. It was the most populous village in its rural district.
