= Hoseynabad, Rudsar =

Village in Gilan province, Iran

Hoseynabad Persian: حسين اباد
- Village
- Location within Iran
- Coordinates: 37°10′51″N 50°16′14″E
- Country: Iran
- Province: Gilan
- County: Rudsar
- District: Central
- Rural District: Chini Jan

Population (2016)
  - Total: 544
- Time zone: UTC+3:30 (IRST)

Hoseynabad (Persian: حسين اباد) (Note: Also romanized as Ḩoseynābād) is a village in Chini Jan Rural District of the Central District in Rudsar County, Gilan province, Iran.

== Demographics ==
=== Population ===
At the time of the 2006 National Census, the village's population was 399 in 108 households. The following census in 2011 counted 359 people in 118 households. The 2016 census measured the population of the village as 544 people in 180 households.
