= Afermejan-e Sofla =

Afermejan-e Sofla افرمجان سفلي
- Village
- Location within Iran
- Coordinates: 37°02′40″N 50°18′01″E
- Country: Iran
- Province: Gilan
- County: Rudsar
- Bakhsh: Central
- Rural District: Reza Mahalleh

Population (2006)
  - Total: 81
- Time zone: UTC+3:30 (IRST)
  - Summer (DST): UTC+4:30 (IRDT)

Afermejan-e Sofla (Persian: افرمجان سفلي, also Romanized as Afermejān-e Soflá; also known as Afermejān-e Pā’īn) is a village in Reza Mahalleh Rural District, in the Central District of Rudsar County, Gilan Province, Iran. At the 2006 census, its population was 81, in 24 families.
