= Afermejan-e Olya =

Afermejan-e Olya افرمجان عليا
- Village
- Location within Iran
- Coordinates: 37°04′21″N 50°17′56″E
- Country: Iran
- Province: Gilan
- County: Rudsar
- Bakhsh: Central
- Rural District: Reza Mahalleh

Population (2006)
  - Total: 86
- Time zone: UTC+3:30 (IRST)
  - Summer (DST): UTC+4:30 (IRDT)

Afermejan-e Olya (Persian: افرمجان عليا, also Romanized as Afermejān-e ‘Olyā; also known as Afermejān-e Bālā) is a village in Reza Mahalleh Rural District, in the Central District of Rudsar County, Gilan Province, Iran. At the 2006 census, its population was 86, in 33 families.
