= Kaldarreh-ye Olya =

Village in Gilan province, Iran

Kaldarreh-ye Olya Persian: كلدره عليا
- Village
- Location within Iran
- Coordinates: 37°06′58″N 50°18′28″E
- Country: Iran
- Province: Gilan
- County: Rudsar
- District: Central
- Rural District: Reza Mahalleh

Population (2016)
  - Total: 729
- Time zone: UTC+3:30 (IRST)

Kaldarreh-ye Olya (Persian: كلدره عليا) (Note: Also romanized as Kaldarreh-ye ‘Olyā; also known as Gol Darreh and Kaldarreh) a village in Reza Mahalleh Rural District of the Central District in Rudsar County, Gilan province, Iran.

== Demographics ==
=== Population ===
At the time of the 2006 National Census, the village's population was 681 in 202 households. The following census in 2011 counted 703 people in 223 households. The 2016 census measured the population of the village as 729 people in 245 households.
