= Kuyeh-ye Sofla =

Village in Gilan province, Iran

Kuyeh-ye Sofla Persian: كويه سفلي
- Village
- Location within Iran
- Coordinates: 37°05′55″N 50°16′07″E
- Country: Iran
- Province: Gilan
- County: Rudsar
- District: Central
- Rural District: Reza Mahalleh

Population (2016)
  - Total: 353
- Time zone: UTC+3:30 (IRST)

Kuyeh-ye Sofla (Persian: كويه سفلي) (Note: Also romanized as Kūyeh-ye Soflá) a village in Reza Mahalleh Rural District of the Central District in Rudsar County, Gilan province, Iran.

== Demographics ==
=== Population ===
At the time of the 2006 National Census, the village's population was 362 in 106 households. The following census in 2011 counted 337 people in 109 households. The 2016 census measured the population of the village as 353 people in 122 households.
