= Kaldarreh-ye Sofla =

Village in Gilan province, Iran

Kaldarreh-ye Sofla Persian: كلدره سفلي
- Village
- Location within Iran
- Coordinates: 37°06′46″N 50°19′12″E
- Country: Iran
- Province: Gilan
- County: Rudsar
- District: Central
- Rural District: Reza Mahalleh

Population (2016)
  - Total: 342
- Time zone: UTC+3:30 (IRST)

Kaldarreh-ye Sofla (Persian: كلدره سفلي) (Note: Also romanized as Kaldarreh-ye Soflá and Kaldarrehsoflá) a village in Reza Mahalleh Rural District of the Central District in Rudsar County, Gilan province, Iran.

== Demographics ==
=== Population ===
At the time of the 2006 National Census, the village's population was 304 in 100 households. The following census in 2011 counted 279 people in 84 households. The 2016 census measured the population of the village as 342 people in 117 households.
