= Gava (surname) =

Gava is a surname. Notable people with the surname include:

- Gava of Tidore (died c. 1560), Moluccan ruler
- Antonio Gava (1930–2008), Italian politician and member of Christian Democracy
- Benedetta Gava (born 2009), Italian artistic gymnast
- Cassandra Gava (born 1959), American actress and producer
- Fabio Gava (born 1949), Italian politician
- Franck Gava (born 1970), former French attacking midfielder football player
- Manuel Gava (born 1991), Italian-born German politician
- Orgest Gava (born 1990), Albanian professional footballer
- Rafael Gava (born 1993), Brazilian midfielder football player
- Silvio Gava (1901–1999), Italian politician
- Todd Gava (born 1981), Australian footballer
- Vannia Gava (born 1974), Italian politician

== See also ==
- Gava (disambiguation)
