= Bala Gava Sara =

Bala Gava Sara بالاگواسرا
- Village
- Country: Iran
- Province: Gilan
- County: Rudsar
- Bakhsh: Central
- Rural District: Chini Jan

Population (2006)
  - Total: 257
- Time zone: UTC+3:30 (IRST)
  - Summer (DST): UTC+4:30 (IRDT)

Bala Gava Sara (Persian: بالاگواسرا, also Romanized as Bālā Gavā Sarā) is a village in Chini Jan Rural District, in the Central District of Rudsar County, Gilan Province, Iran. At the 2006 census, its population was 257, in 69 families.
