= Reza Mahalleh, Rudsar =

Village in Gilan province, Iran

Reza Mahalleh Persian: رضا محله
- Village
- Location within Iran
- Coordinates: 37°04′54″N 50°18′45″E
- Country: Iran
- Province: Gilan
- County: Rudsar
- District: Central
- Rural District: Reza Mahalleh

Population (2016)
  - Total: 524
- Time zone: UTC+3:30 (IRST)

Reza Mahalleh (Persian: رضامحله) (Note: Also romanized as Reẕā Maḩalleh) is a village in, and the capital of, Reza Mahalleh Rural District in the Central District of Rudsar County, Gilan province, Iran.

== Demographics ==
=== Population ===
At the time of the 2006 National Census, the village's population was 491 in 142 households. The following census in 2011 counted 543 people in 177 households. The 2016 census measured the population of the village as 524 people in 200 households.
