= Gavà Museum and the Gavà Mines Archaeological Park =

Archaeological park and museum

Coordinates: 41°18′24.18″N 2°0′15.07″E

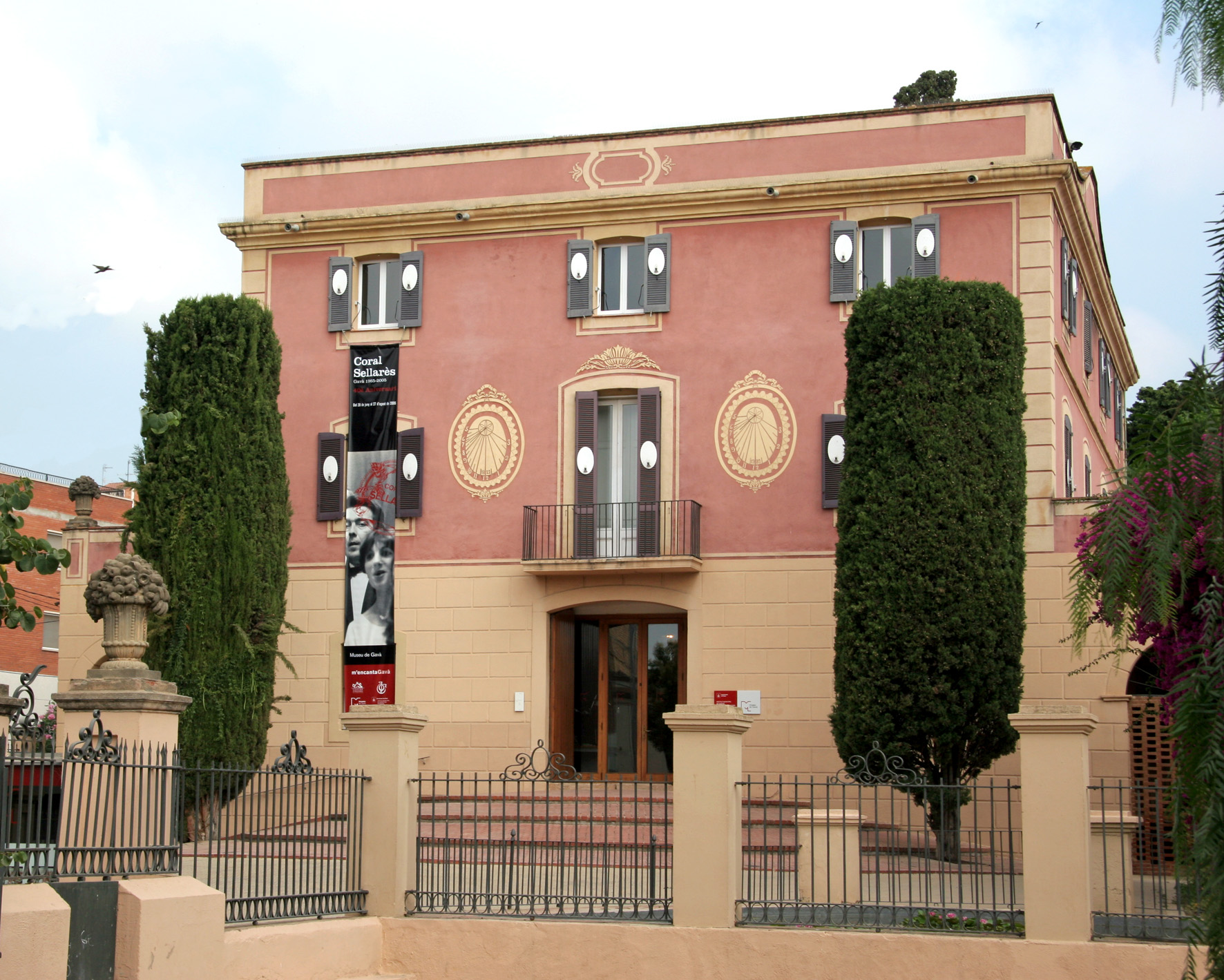
Gavà Museum

The Gavà Museum and the Gavà Mines Archaeological Park, founded in 1978, comprises two facilities: the Gavà Museum and the Gavà Mines Archaeological Park. It is part of the Barcelona Provincial Council Local Museum Network.

== Gavà Museum ==
The Gavà Museum is located in the Lluc torre; a middle class family summer home built in 1799. The building has a multi-purpose room in the basement, temporary exhibition halls and an educational workshop on the ground floor, and the permanent exhibition Gavà, les veus del paisatge (Gavà, a landscape of voices) on the top floor. The visit includes a botanical garden with native plants, grouped into the different zones of the El Garraf Massif and the Llobregat Delta.

== Gavà Mines Archaeological Park ==
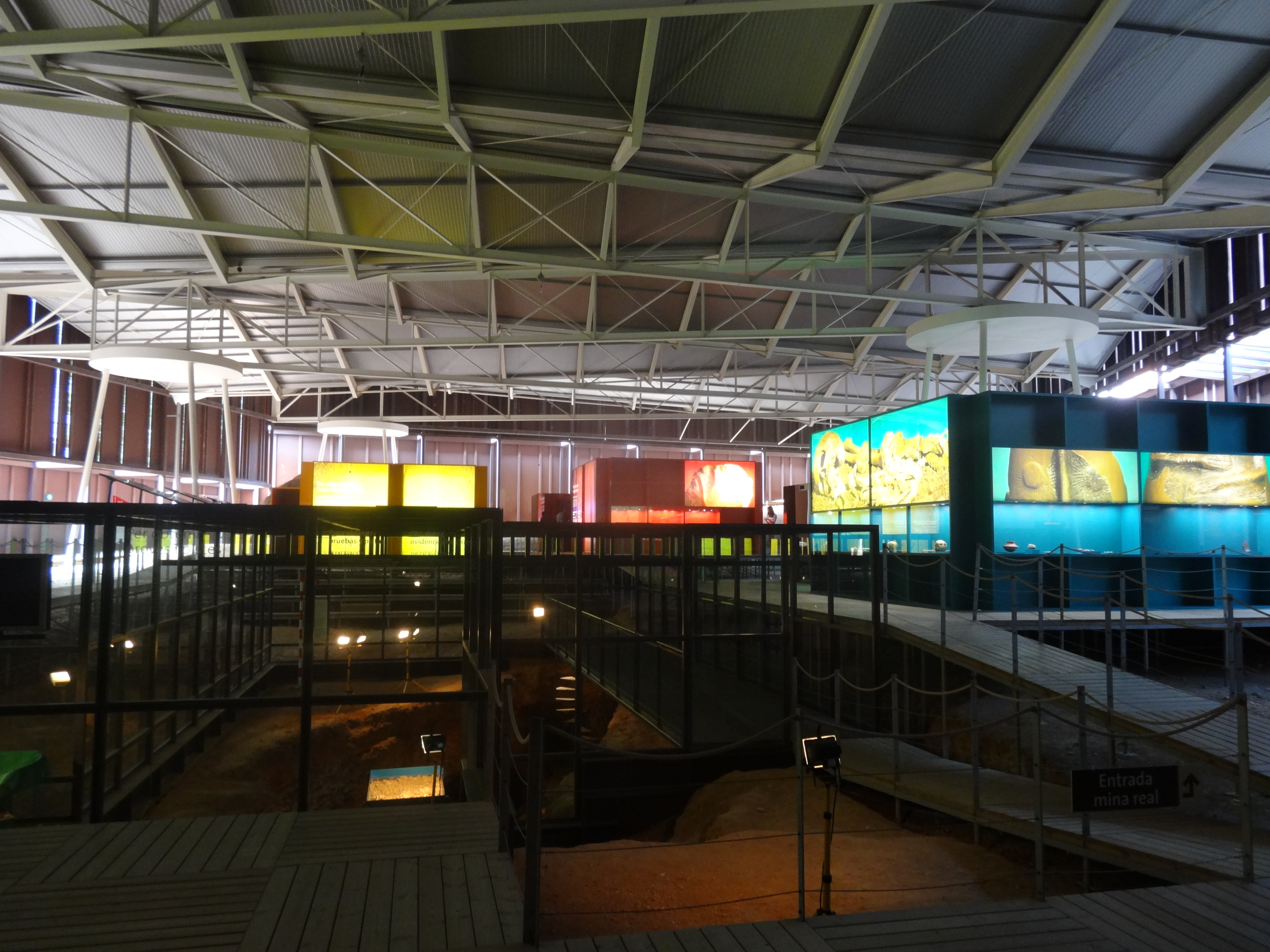
Gavà Mines Archaeological Park

The Gavà Mines Archaeological Park, opened in 2007, allows one to visit the site of the Gavà prehistoric mines, the oldest gallery of mines in Europe, which were used to mine variscite.
