= Lashkajan-e Sofla =

Village in Gilan province, Iran

Lashkajan-e Sofla Persian: لشكاجان سفلی
- Village
- Location within Iran
- Coordinates: 37°05′44″N 50°16′44″E
- Country: Iran
- Province: Gilan
- County: Rudsar
- District: Central
- Rural District: Reza Mahalleh

Population (2016)
  - Total: 482
- Time zone: UTC+3:30 (IRST)

Lashkajan-e Sofla (Persian: لشكاجان سفلی) (Note: Also romanized as Lashkā Jān-e Soflá and Lashkājān-e Soflá; also known as Lashkā Jān-e Pāīn) a village in Reza Mahalleh Rural District of the Central District in Rudsar County, Gilan province, Iran.

== Demographics ==
=== Population ===
At the time of the 2006 National Census, the village's population was 570 in 191 households. The following census in 2011 counted 569 people in 204 households. The 2016 census measured the population of the village as 482 people in 188 households.
