= Gava Sara-ye Olya =

Gava Sara-ye Olya گواسراعليا
- Village
- Country: Iran
- Province: Gilan
- County: Rudsar
- Bakhsh: Central
- Rural District: Chini Jan

Population (2006)
  - Total: 242
- Time zone: UTC+3:30 (IRST)
  - Summer (DST): UTC+4:30 (IRDT)

Gava Sara-ye Olya (Persian: گواسراعليا, also Romanized as Gavā Sarā-ye ‘Olyā) is a village in Chini Jan Rural District, in the Central District of Rudsar County, Gilan Province, Iran. At the 2006 census, its population was 242, in 70 families.
