= Gavà Mines =

Coordinates: 41°18′37.54″N 2°0′0.75″E

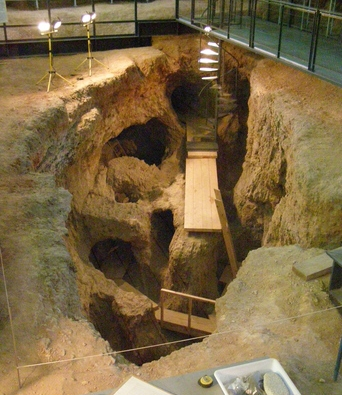
Prehistoric Mines of Gava.

The Gavà Mines, also known as Can Tintorer Mines, is a pre-historic (Neolithic) archaeological site that occupies the Can Tintorer, Ferreres and Rocabruna areas in the municipality of Gavà (Baix Llobregat, Catalonia, Spain). The site is under care of the Gavà Museum and the Gavà Mines Archaeological Park.

The main feature of the site is a collection of ancient mines that are among the largest and oldest in Europe. The site is spread over 200 hectares and comprises more than a hundred known mines, with many more possibly to be still unidentified. Among them are the only known Neolithic mines of variscite, a green mineral used to make body ornaments.

From the Iberian and Roman times through the Middle Ages, the mines were re-exploited to obtain iron ore.

Notable finds from the site are the Venus of Gavà and the Trepanation Skull.

== Geographic and geological situation ==
The Gavà mines are located on the West side of the Llobregat River, at the foot of the eastern slopes of the Garraf Massif, in the sectors known as Ferreres, Rocabruna and Tintorer.

The geological structure of the area is dominated by slates and limestones of the Paleozoic era, formed between the Silurian and Devonian periods, about 408 million years ago. Slates and limestones are arranged in strongly inclined layers with numerous folds, faults, and overlays, due to folding during the Variscan orogeny (290 million years ago) and the Alpine orogeny (65 million years ago). There are two geologic alignments that vary between WNW-ESE and W-E. A limestone crust and red clays formed at the beginning of the Quaternary (1.64 million years ago), covering the Paleozoic slates and limestones.

== Modern history ==
The site was discovered in 1975 when construction in the neighborhood of Can Tintorer revealed openings to the rock. However, the presence of "holes" in the ground was known to the local population, which had been using some of them since antiquity.

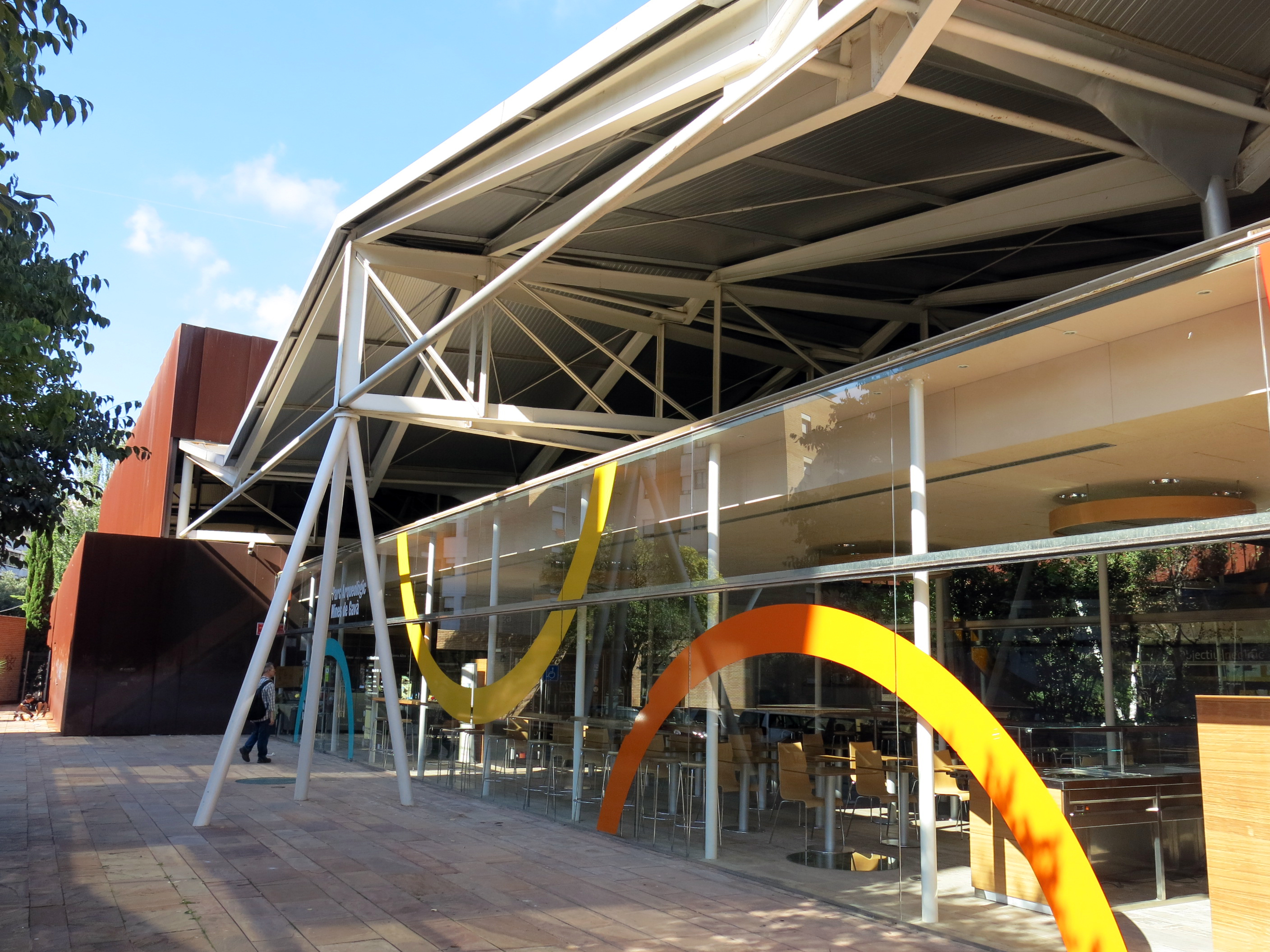
Building that houses the Archaeological Park of the Mines of Gavà

In 1978 the original nucleus of the CIPAG (Collective for the Investigation of Prehistory and Archeology of the Garraf-Ordal) began the first archaeological excavations. The Gavà Museum was created later in that year, with the mission to explore the site and research, store, and divulge its finds. Until the year 1980, the located mines were excavated and the ground was reduced mechanically to locate new ones. In 1991 the Gavà Museum assumed the excavations, and part of the museum was opened to the public in 1993.

It was during those years that two of the unique pieces of the site were discovered: the Venus of Gavà and the Trepaned Skull. In parallel to the excavations and the dissemination, the works of conservation and restoration began with the collaboration of the Department of Mining and Natural Resources of the Universitat Politècnica de Catalunya. After a break, the excavations and restoration and consolidation work were resumed between 1998 and 2000. Additional excavation, conservation, and research were carried out by the University of Barcelona and the Autonomous University of Barcelona

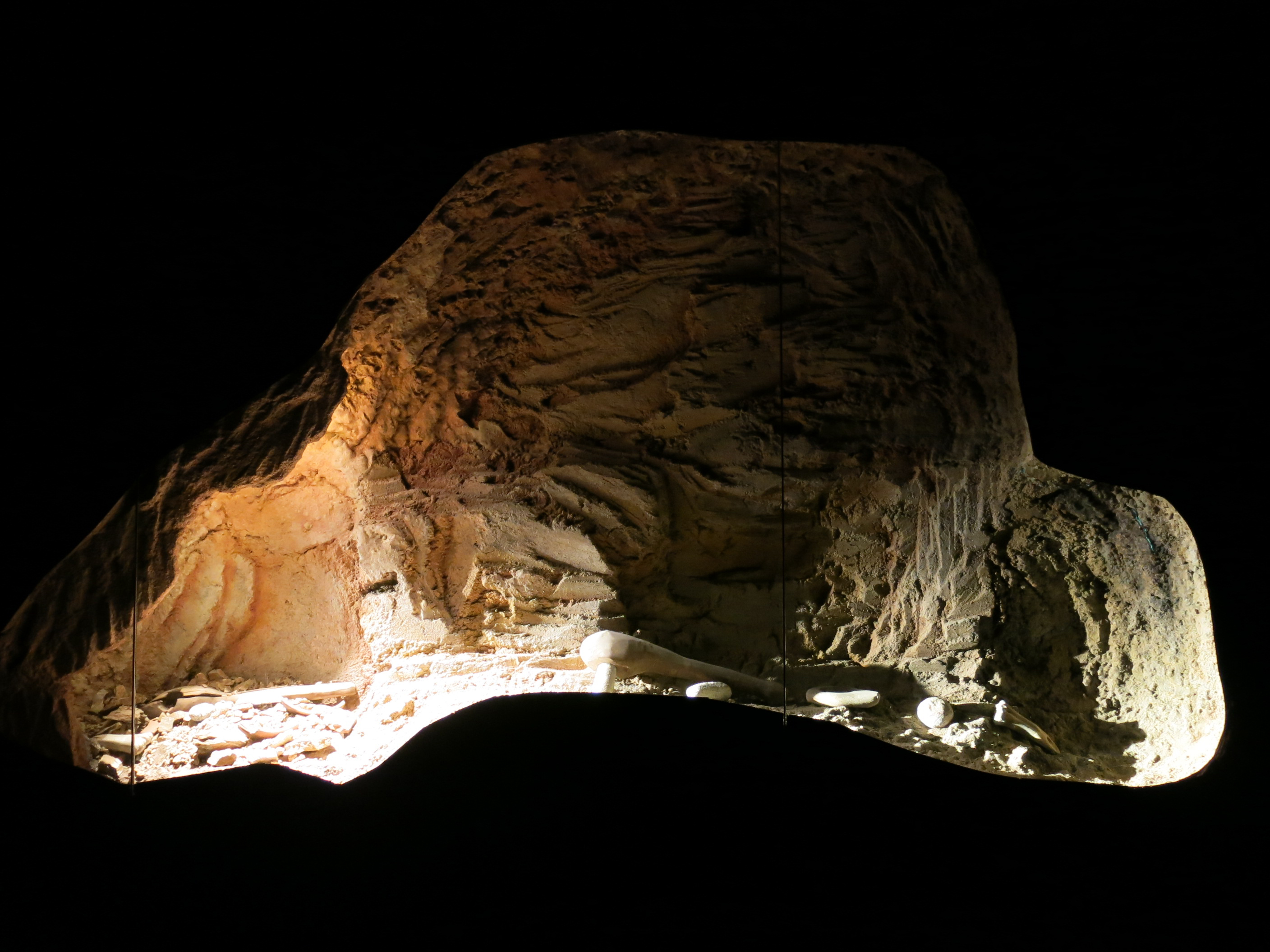
Reconstruction of a mine.

Due to an urban development project, in 1998 a new sector of the site was identified in the Serra de les Ferreres. The works will last until 2009. New Neolithic and Iberian-Roman mines (number 83, 84 and 85) were located and excavated, yielding funerary artifacts with exceptional pieces such as a red coral necklace, an obsidian plate, square-shaped ceramics and honey silex.

== Timeline ==
The Neolithic mines were continuously exploited between the Advanced Old Neolithic or Postcardial and the Middle Neolithic, as evidenced by ceramics characteristic of the Molinot culture of the Postcardial and to the Ditch Tomb Culture of the Middle Neolithic .

Carbon-14 dating puts the Postcardial sites between 3350 and 2950 BCE (not calibrated) and those of the Middle Neolithic between 2950 and 2550 BC (not calibrated). This would place them between 4200 BC and 3400 BC.

It must be borne in mind, however, that dating comes from samples belonging to the mining waste after the mines became inactive; therefore, the exploitation may be earlier. Indeed, variscite from Gavà has been found in the Can Sadurní Cave near Begues with Postcardial dates prior to those identified in Gavà. Other samples, found in Huesca province at the Chaves Cave (near Bastarás) and Moro Cave (near Olvena), were chemically confirmed as Gavà but located in burials of the Old Neolithic from the 6th millennium BCE.

There are no agreed-on dates for the Ibero-Roman mines, but the exploitation would be located between the 4th and 9th centuries CE.

== Neolithic period ==
=== Flora ===
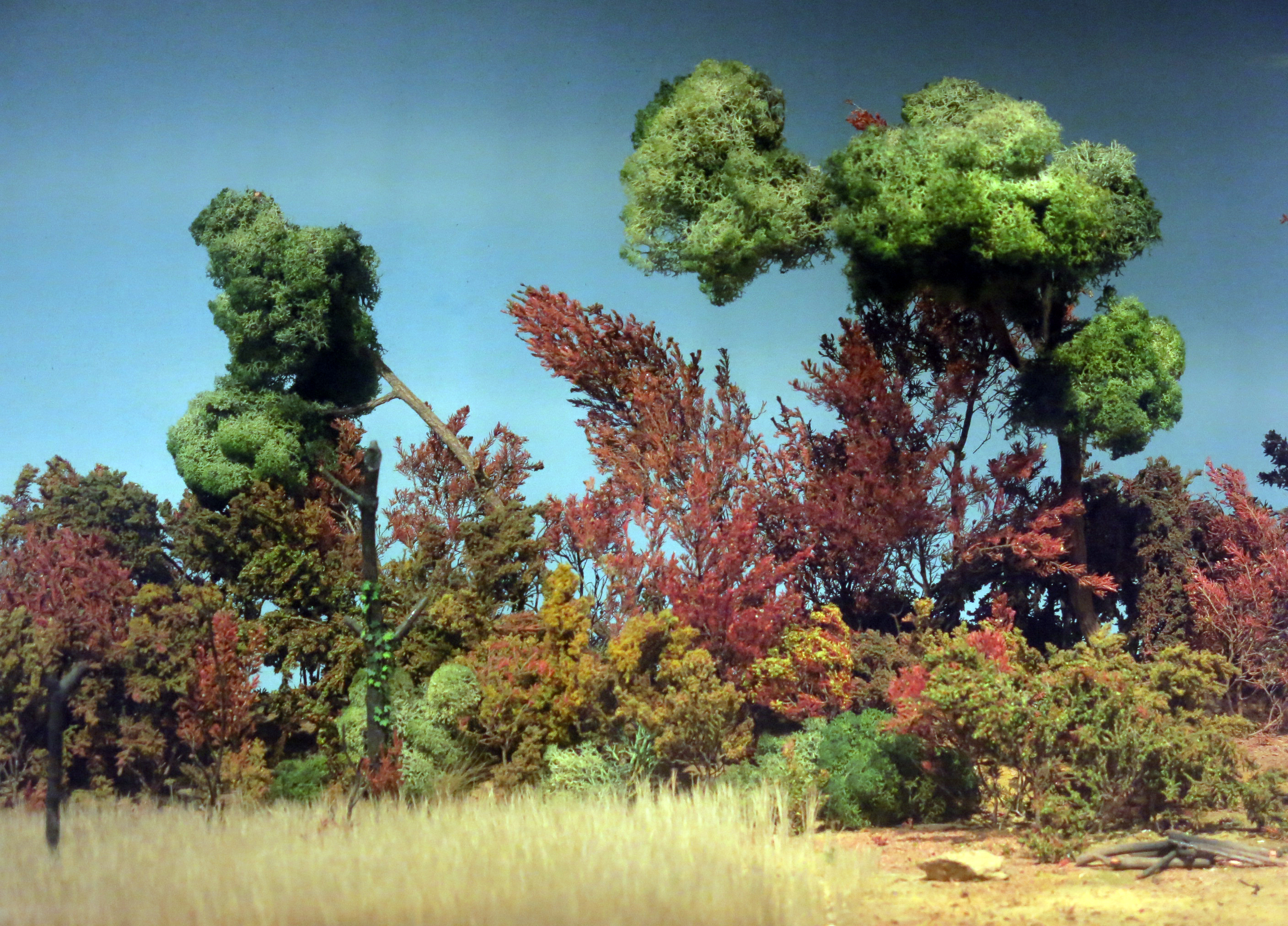
Diorama of local Neolithic landscape, at the Museum.

In the Neolithic, the inhabitants of the site had access to varied vegetation environments from the surrounding mountains, plain, and coast.

Along the coastline the flora was mainly oleo-ceratonion shrubland, with shrubs like the European fan palm (Chamaerops humilis), lentisk (Pistacia lentiscus), heather (Erica sp.), olive tree (Olea europaea), juniper (Juniperus sp.) and Aleppo pine (Pinus halepensis). Elsewhere there were forests of sclerophyllous and deciduous oak trees (Quercus sp.), strawberry trees (Arbutus unedo), buckthorns (Rhamnus sp.) or mock privet (Phillyrea sp.), and adler (Alnus sp.), as attested by charcoal fragments found in the mines. Some of these trees were exploited for their wood.

Along rivers there grew forests with willows (Salix sp.), poplar, laurel (Laurus nobilis), ferns, kermes oak (Quercus coccifera) and cultivated fields.

=== Food resources ===
Soil deposits in the mines, dated from the Neolithic, yielded animal and vegetable remains, and tools such as arrowheads, hand grinders, axe heads and sickle teeth; showing that the caves had other uses besides mining. The presence of ruderal species and adventitious plants, as well as the association Rumex-Plantago-Cyperaceae shows the existence of disturbed and nitrified soils due to anthropogenic actions such as agriculture and livestock.

Animal resources were used and exploited for food and secondary products like milk, wool, and leather. The main livestock was bovids, followed by ovicaprids and some pigs. The animal diet was complemented by hunting, chiefly of deer, wild boar and rabbits; and by fishing of seabream (Pagrus pagrus), pandora (Pagellus erythrinus), cuttlefish, and school shark (Galeorhinus galeus). Shellfish was collected for both food and ornamental purposes, including Chamelea gallina, the Mediterranean mussel (Mytilus galloprovincialis), limpets (Patella sp.), and bittersweet clams (Glycymeris sp.). Land mollusks such as the vineyard snail (Cernuella virgata), grove snail (Cepaea nemoralis), and cabrilla (Otala punctata) were consumed too.

The crops were mainly of barley (Hordeum vulgare and H. vulgare var. nudum) and, to a lesser extent, of wheat (Triticum monococcum, Triticum dicoccum, and Triticum aestivum). Legumes such as vetches (Vicia sp.) were also cultivated. The inhabitants also collected wild plant resources, such as olives, fox grapes (Vitis labrusca) and hazelnuts (Corylus avellana).

=== Technology ===
The local inhabitants of the site during the Neolithic mining period used tools made of bone, and both chipped and polished stone. The chipped artifacts included flint and obsidian blades. They also used ceramic pots made of local clay and generally baked over open fires. Characteristic ceramics found among grave offerings include wide-mouth pots with a perforated horizontal ridge at mid-height, presumably intended to be suspended by ropes; and rectangular box-like bowls.

=== Burials ===
Once exhausted, some Neolithic mines were reused as tombs. Those burials contain remains of men and women, including children, adults and old men.

Some bodies were placed in collective burials in the entrance well to the mine. After displacing the remains previously buried, the body was placed in a fetal position which was accompanied by funerary offerings (ceramics, tools, ornaments, etc.). In some cases, olive tree branches were burned.

Individual and double burials were richer and more elaborate. They are found in small rooms, in places deep and away from the entrance of the mine. The burial space was closed with slabs and access to the mine was also closed with large slabs and stones.

=== Society and beliefs ===
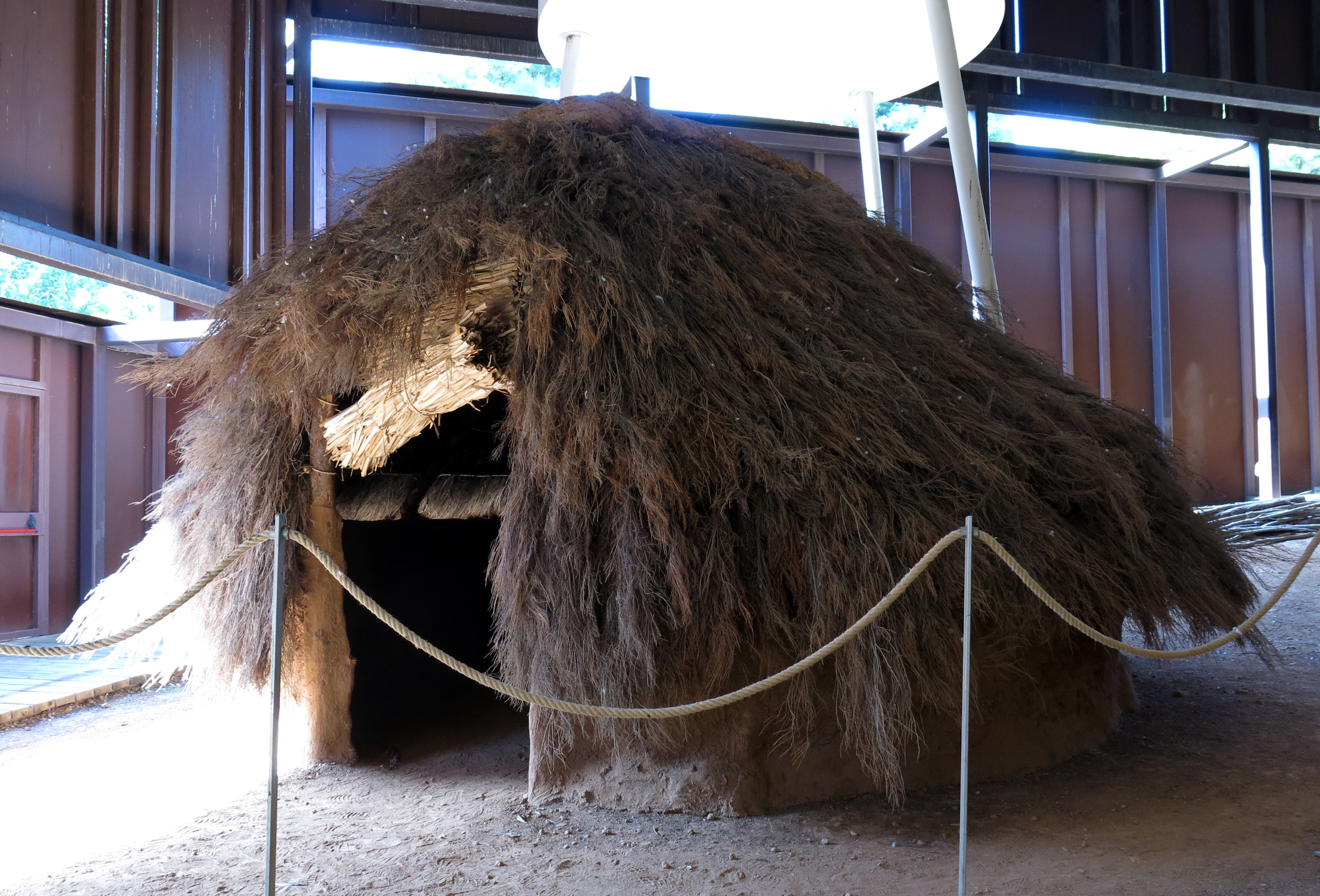
Neolithic cabin model at the mining archaeological park

The mine burials give some information on the society and culture of the Neolithic community. The average life expectancy was around 30 years; The average height of men was 164 cm and that of women 151 cm. In the bones of some individuals—men and women—there is evidence compatible with mining work, which may show specialization of labor. These signs include development of muscular inserts that denote flexing and extending the arms, carrying weight on the back, strong wrists, flexing of the legs at the hip joint and rotation of the torso.

The differences in burials may be indicative of social inequalities. The burials also provide evidence of medico-sanitary practices, including healed bone fractures and an individual who survived two skull trepanations.

The exploitation of variscite and its association to burials suggests that it had symbolic value. The same can be said of the practice of burying the dead in the mines. It has been conjectured that the stone's green color was symbolic of life; and the fetal position of the bodies, as well as the funerary offerings, reflected a cult of the Earth and belief in rebirth.

That the community had specific religious beliefs is strongly indicated by figurines such as the Venus of Gavà, which has been interpreted as a fertility goddess Another puzzling find, that may have religious significance, is a large collection of artifacts including bone tools, arrowheads, variscite beads, and more, in mine 85.

=== Mine structure and contents ===
The Neolithic mines varied significantly in size, geometry, and archaeological contents. Below are some representative examples.

==== Mine 83 ====
Mine 83 was excavated in 1999–2003. Access is through a vertical well about 1 m in diameter and 1.5 m deep. At the bottom, two galleries branch off in roughly opposite directions, about 1 m wide and tall: one straight and level, 2 m long, and the other bent at a right angle, 4 m long, descending another 1.5m.

After the mine was exhausted, it apparently lay empty for a long time. Then a funerary chamber, about 1.5 m by 2 m, was dug off the "elbow" of the longer gallery, to hold the burial of one or more individuals. The mine was then sealed off: the burial chamber was closed with two limestone slabs, the entrances of the two galleries were blocked with soil and irregular stone blocks 20–25 cm wide. The entrance well then was blocked with a large boulder, roughly egg-shaped, about 1.3 m tall and 90 cm wide, and more soil. Radiocarbon dating indicates that the mine was dug before 4050 BCE and closed after that date (plus or minus a couple of centuries).

Apart from the burial chamber, the only objects found in mine 83 were a ceramics plate and some animal remains from the mining phase, and some ceramics fragments mixed in the soil used to seal off the burial. In the funerary chamber were found a rectangular box-like ceramic bowl (with traces of fatty acids, suggesting that it contained lard or tallow, possibly part of a confit), stone axe heads, a bone tool, cylindrical flint cores, blades of flint, a blade of obsidian from Sardinia, a handful of variscite bits, and two necklaces (one of variscite with polished oval beads, and one of red coral. The bones seem to belong to a single adult individual, but they were extremely fragmented and incomplete, so the sex could not be determined. The skull was completely missing, except for a few pieces of broken teeth.

==== Mine 84 ====
Mine 84 was excavated in 1999–2003. This mine has a complex geometry and history. The original opening was a vertical well about 1.5 m deep and 1 m wide. At the bottom, there starts a straight gallery (1) about 10 m long, that slopes down for about 2.5 m. A second access well, which may have been created accidentally, is located about 2 m from the first one. The gallery ends in a room (r2) about 3 m wide and 3 m tall, from which three other galleries branch off. Two of them (3a and 3b), about 7–8 m long, go off on opposite directions, at about right angles of gallery 1. A shorter gallery (2), about 2 m long, branches off at a level about 1–2 m higher, and ends right above a part of gallery 3a. Most of the passages have roundish cross-section and are about 1 to 1.5 m wide. Gallery 3a broadens at the end into a room (r1) about 2 m wide. At a few places along those main galleries there are short side branches and a couple of shallow pits.

The tunnels still preserve signs of the mining activity, such as a walking floor of compacted gravel, presumably from the mine itself; pickaxe marks on the walls; and niches that presumably held lamps. There are no significant archaeological remains from this period.

After exhaustion and a long period of abandonment, the mine was reused as a burial site. Two individuals were buried in at the end of gallery 3a, in distinct epochs, with many grave offerings. The entrance of gallery 3a, and gallery 1 right after the second access well, were closed off with limestone slabs 50–100 cm wide, blocks of stone 20–30 cm wide, and soil. The closures appear to have been intended to be temporary, presumably to allow additional burials at a later time. Access well 1 was blocked in a similar way, but more substantially. Radiocarbon dating of materials in the mine is ambiguous and gives two likely dates, 3900 and 3750 BC (with uncertainty of a few decades). Either way, the exploitation of the mine and both burials seem to have occurred within the space of a few decades.

The skeletal remains were highly fragmented, with natural and human-inflicted fractures. They had been deposited on the floor of the mine, without interment, and have been affected by animals (worms and rodents) and water that leaked into the mine. The bone fragments of individual 1, a mature adult man, where scattered over a couple of meters; they seem to have been pushed out of room r1 to clear the place for burial of individual 2, a taller but more gracile mature woman. The few teeth that were preserved had their crowns completely worn off, indicating an abrasive diet or their use as tools. The bones of the face of both individuals were missing, and there is evidence that the face of individual 1 was cut away from the skull at the time of death. His skull also shows apparent marks of two fully healed blows. The bones of individual 2 show signs of heavy labor, especially of the right arm, and of carrying heavy loads on the head. The offerings found with the two burials included two ceramic urns, a rectangular ceramics bowl, bone tools, an ox bone, a Glycymeris shell, flint blades, and some boar tusks. Some ceramics fragments were also found mixed in the soil used to seal off the burial.

== See also ==
- History of Catalonia
- Iron mining
