= Rudsar =

City in Gilan province, Iran

Rudsar Persian: رودسر
- City
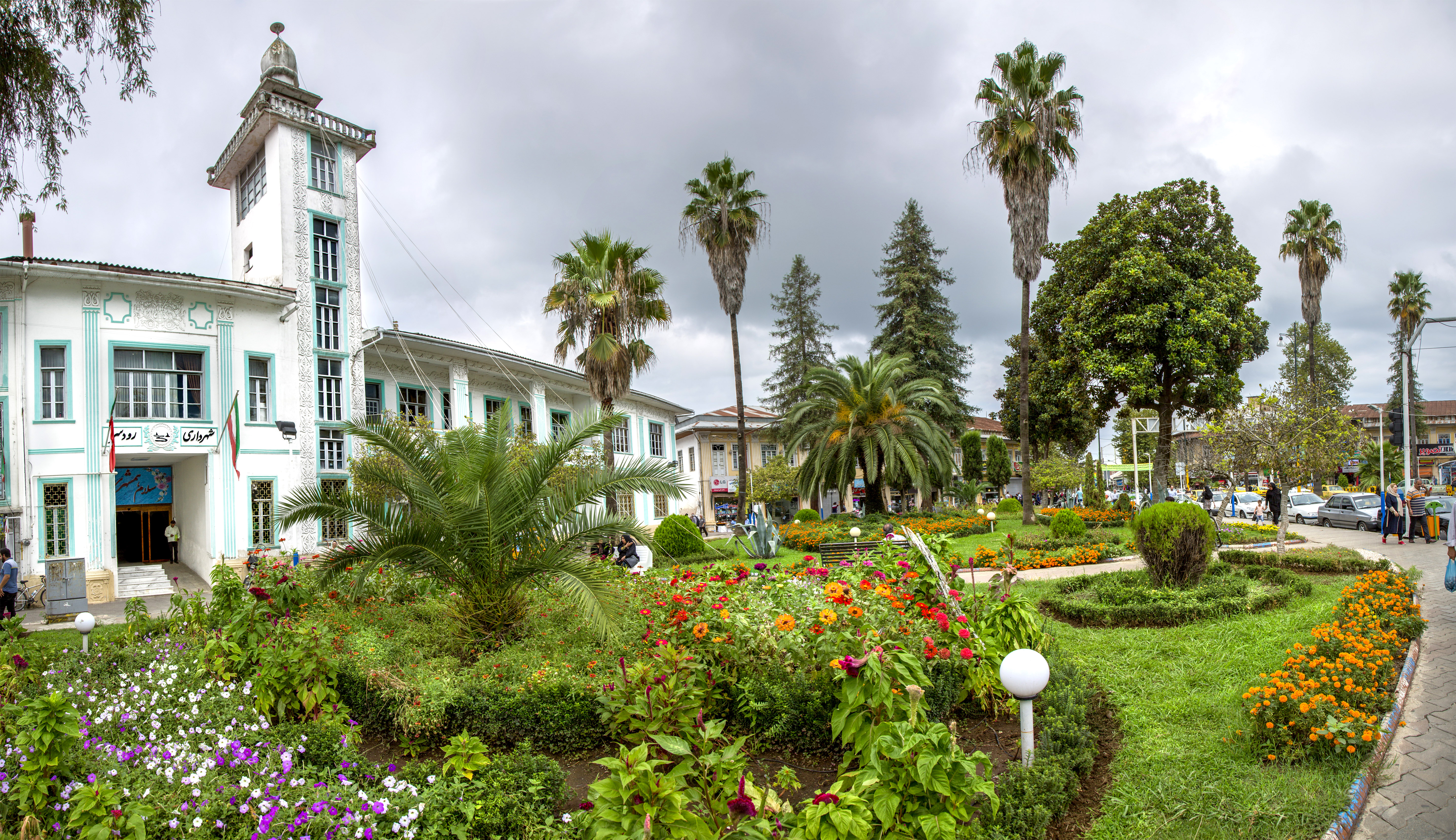
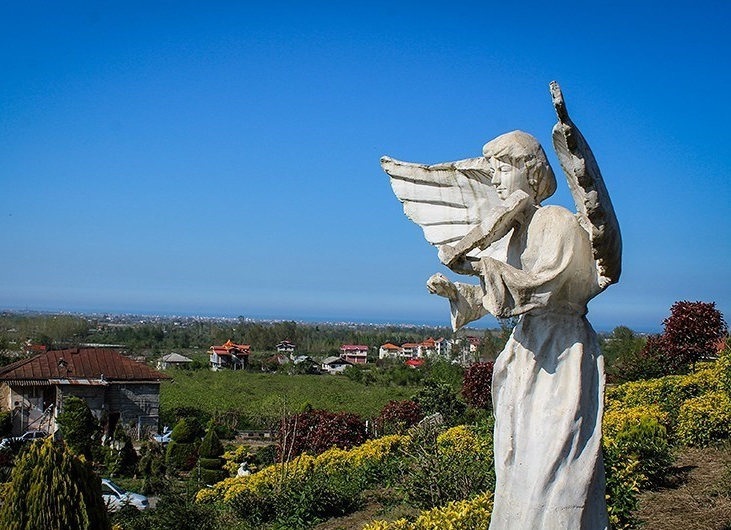
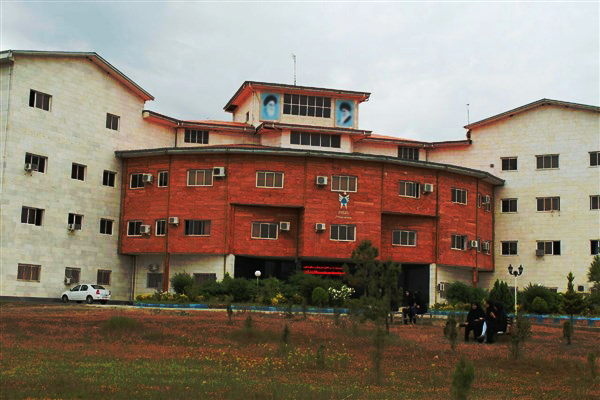
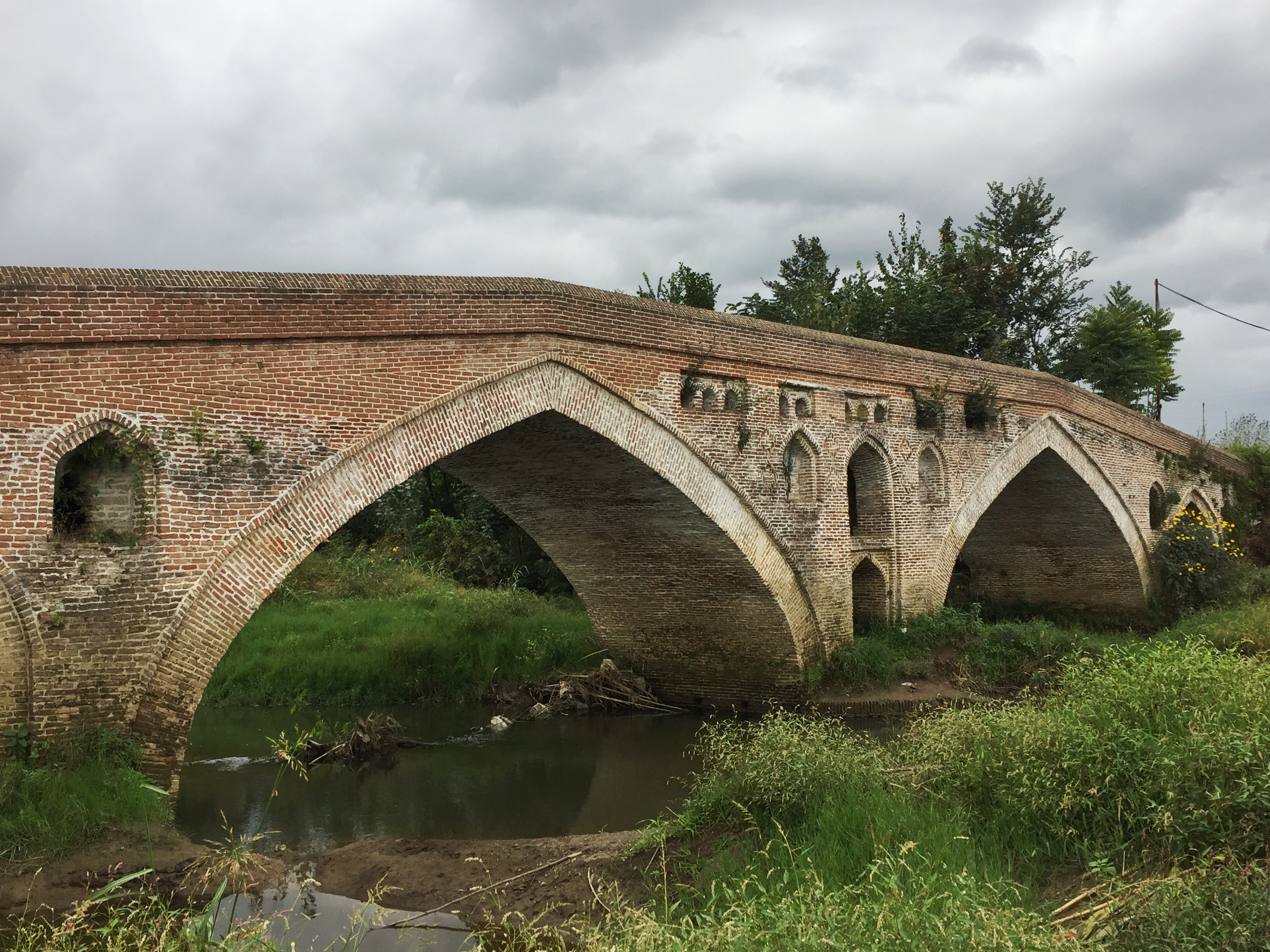
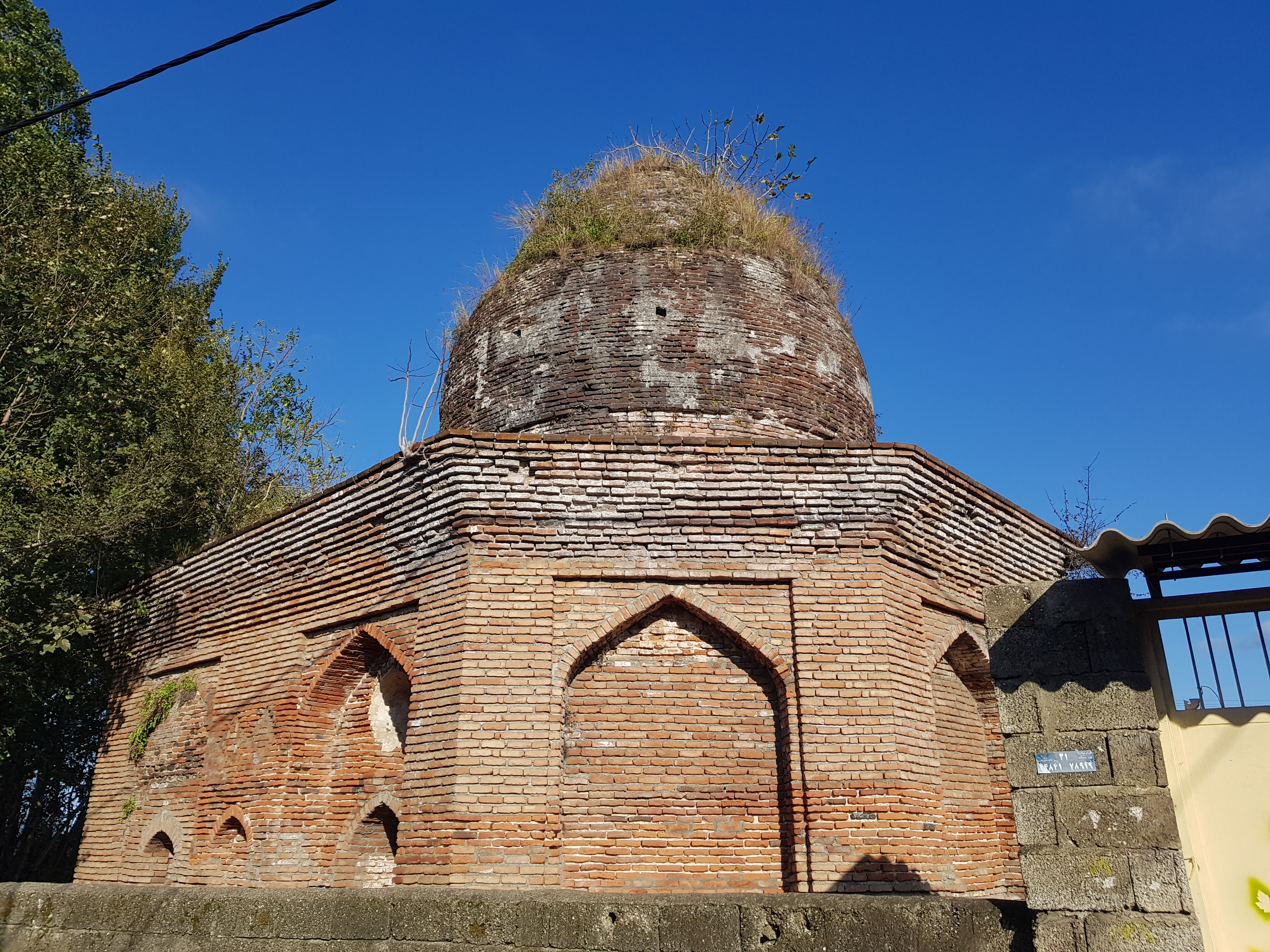

- Location within Iran
- Coordinates: 37°08′40″N 50°17′37″E
- Country: Iran
- Province: Gilan
- County: Rudsar
- District: Central

Population (2016)
  - Total: 37,998
- Time zone: UTC+3:30 (IRST)

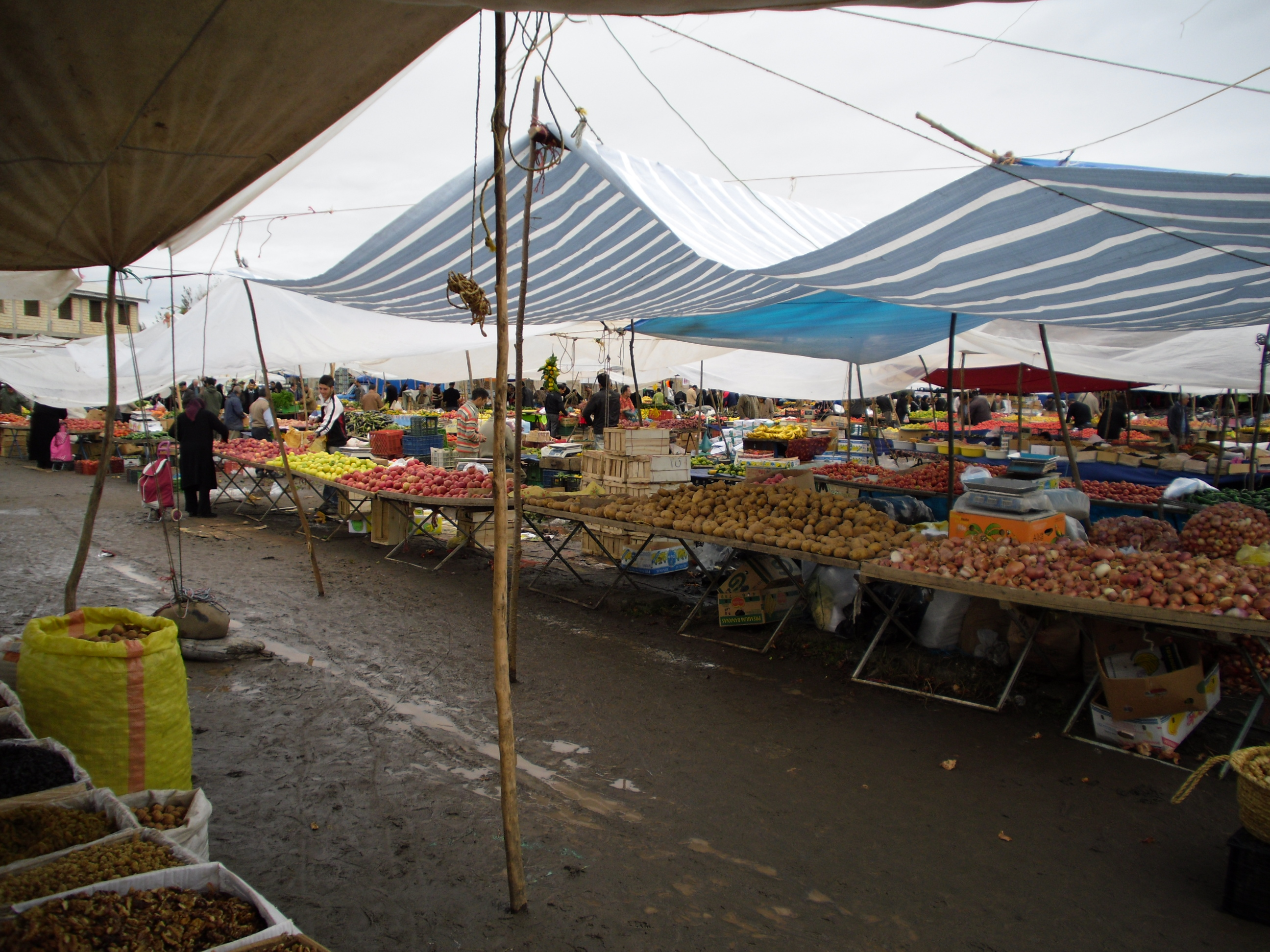
Rainy Sunday in Rudsar's Market

Rudsar (Persian: رودسر) (Note: Also romanized as Roodsar and Rūdsar; also known as Rūd-i-Sar; and Rudesar (Gilaki: رۊدسر)) is a city in the Central District of Rudsar County, Gilan province, Iran, serving as capital of both the county and the district.

== Etymology ==
The word Rudsar comes from the word Rud, the Persian word for river, and sar, the Persian word for head, since Rudsar has rivers running along each side of the city.

== History ==
According to valid historical documents, the ancient name of Roodsar was "Koutum", which was a small city in Rankooh. The other name of Roodsar was "Hoosem" that had a thriving bazaar and big mosque in the year 375 AH. Later on this city was ruined for unknown reasons, and was reconstructed by Seyed Reza Kiya during the years 789-831 AH.

It was occupied by Russian forces along with the rest of northern Iran in the early 1900s.

== Demographics ==
=== Population ===
At the time of the 2006 National Census, the city's population was 33,321 in 9,741 households. The following census in 2011 counted 37,579 people in 11,903 households. The 2016 census measured the population of the city as 37,998 people in 13,191 households.

== Geography ==
=== Location ===
Rudsar is on the Caspian Sea, on a verdant coastal plain with a moderate climate, 326 kilometres (203 mi) from Tehran.

=== Climate ===
Rudsar has a humid subtropical climate (Köppen: Cfa, Trewartha: Cf), with warm, humid summers and cool, damp winters.

Climate data for Rudsar
| Month | Jan | Feb | Mar | Apr | May | Jun | Jul | Aug | Sep | Oct | Nov | Dec | Year |
|---|---|---|---|---|---|---|---|---|---|---|---|---|---|
| Mean daily maximum °C (°F) | 10.1 (50.2) | 9.9 (49.8) | 11.9 (53.4) | 17.2 (63.0) | 22.4 (72.3) | 26.9 (80.4) | 29.4 (84.9) | 29.0 (84.2) | 26.1 (79.0) | 21.2 (70.2) | 17.1 (62.8) | 12.9 (55.2) | 19.5 (67.1) |
| Mean daily minimum °C (°F) | 2.3 (36.1) | 2.7 (36.9) | 5.3 (41.5) | 9.4 (48.9) | 14.3 (57.7) | 18.3 (64.9) | 20.8 (69.4) | 20.6 (69.1) | 18.0 (64.4) | 13.5 (56.3) | 8.9 (48.0) | 4.7 (40.5) | 11.6 (52.8) |
| Average precipitation mm (inches) | 80.62 (3.17) | 105.51 (4.15) | 98.86 (3.89) | 62.07 (2.44) | 25.33 (1.00) | 42.45 (1.67) | 82.19 (3.24) | 60.07 (2.36) | 160.48 (6.32) | 251.79 (9.91) | 190.82 (7.51) | 114.71 (4.52) | 1,274.9 (50.18) |
| Average extreme snow depth cm (inches) | 3.61 (1.42) | 2.04 (0.80) | 0 (0) | 0 (0) | 0 (0) | 0 (0) | 0 (0) | 0 (0) | 0 (0) | 0 (0) | 0 (0) | 0 (0) | 3.61 (1.42) |
| Average precipitation days | 12.2 | 11.8 | 15 | 12.4 | 11.3 | 7 | 5.6 | 8.4 | 10.7 | 13.6 | 11.7 | 12.1 | 131.8 |
| Average relative humidity (%) | 83.3 | 84 | 84.8 | 81.9 | 80 | 75.8 | 74.3 | 77.1 | 80.3 | 83.6 | 83.8 | 83.8 | 81.1 |
| Average dew point °C (°F) | 3.6 (38.5) | 3.8 (38.8) | 6.2 (43.2) | 10.3 (50.5) | 14.8 (58.6) | 18.1 (64.6) | 20.2 (68.4) | 20.5 (68.9) | 18.5 (65.3) | 14.5 (58.1) | 10.3 (50.5) | 6.2 (43.2) | 12.3 (54.1) |
| Mean monthly sunshine hours | 114.7 | 101.7 | 93 | 132 | 182.9 | 222 | 223.2 | 189.1 | 150 | 127.1 | 117 | 105.4 | 1,758.1 |
| Mean daily sunshine hours | 3.7 | 3.6 | 3 | 4.4 | 5.9 | 7.4 | 7.2 | 6.1 | 5 | 4.1 | 3.9 | 3.4 | 4.8 |
| Mean daily daylight hours | 10.4 | 11.3 | 12.4 | 12.4 | 14.7 | 15.2 | 14.9 | 14 | 12.8 | 11.7 | 10.6 | 10.1 | 12.5 |
| Percentage possible sunshine | 34.4 | 31 | 23.3 | 31.7 | 39.3 | 47.2 | 46.6 | 42 | 37.5 | 33.5 | 35.3 | 32 | 36.2 |
Source 1: IRIMO(precipitation 2007-2016, snow depth 2007-2023)
Source 2: =Weatherbase Weathre2visit(Sun)

== Economy ==
The economy of the city is based on fishing and agriculture. The major products of Roudsar are rice, tea, citrus fruits, and silk.

== Notable people ==
- Abbas Mahfouzi, Cleric
- Ataollah Salehi, General
- Mohammad Mohammadi Gilani, Cleric, Head of Guardian Council and Supreme Court
- Asadollah Abbasi, Governor General of Gilan

Professor Mohammad Taghi Rouhani Rankohi, Father of Iranian Database Professor Mir Bahadragoli Arianjad, Famous Professor of Iranian Industrial Engineering Fakhr Razi Masood Moradi, International Football Referee Seyed Ali Mirmiran, Four-time World Heavyweight Champion Ahmad Gergin Rudsari, Poet Ezzat Dastranj, Architect) . The Rudsar Bathhouse, known as Dastranj, is one of his creations. Khosrow Jalalinejad, One of the famous architects of Rudsar.
