= Reza Mahalleh, Mazandaran =

Reza Mahalleh رضامحله
- Village
- Location within Iran
- Coordinates: 36°47′45″N 50°49′32″E
- Country: Iran
- Province: Mazandaran
- County: Tonekabon
- Bakhsh: Central
- Rural District: Goli Jan

Population (2006)
  - Total: 179
- Time zone: UTC+3:30 (IRST)
  - Summer (DST): UTC+4:30 (IRDT)

Reza Mahalleh (Persian: رضامحله, also Romanized as Reẕā Maḩalleh; also known as Reẕā Maḩalleh-ye Bālā) is a village in Goli Jan Rural District, in the Central District of Tonekabon County, Mazandaran Province, Iran. At the 2006 census, its population was 179, in 54 families.
