= Chini Jan Rural District =

Rural district in Gilan province, Iran

Chini Jan Rural District Persian: دهستان چيني جان
- Rural District
- Location within Iran
- Coordinates: 37°09′N 50°16′E
- Country: Iran
- Province: Gilan
- County: Rudsar
- District: Central
- Established: 1987
- Capital: Chini Jan

Population (2016)
  - Total: 9,246
- Time zone: UTC+3:30 (IRST)

Chini Jan Rural District (Persian: دهستان چيني جان) is in the Central District of Rudsar County, Gilan province, Iran. Its capital is the village of Chini Jan.

== Demographics ==
=== Population ===
At the time of the 2006 National Census, the rural district's population was 11,653 in 3,371 households. There were 8,855 inhabitants in 2,874 households at the following census of 2011. The 2016 census measured the population of the rural district as 9,246 in 3,331 households. The most populous of its 19 villages was Ahmadabad, with 1,454 people.

=== Other villages in the rural district ===
- Hoseynabad
- Kishakajan
- Kolka Sara
- Lehdarbon
- Mian Poshteh
- Naser Sara
- Tamijan
