= Reza Mahalleh Rural District =

Rural district in Gilan province, Iran

Reza Mahalleh Rural District Persian: دهستان رضا محله
- Rural District
- Location within Iran
- Coordinates: 37°05′N 50°19′E
- Country: Iran
- Province: Gilan
- County: Rudsar
- District: Central
- Established: 1987
- Capital: Reza Mahalleh

Population (2016)
  - Total: 11,348
- Time zone: UTC+3:30 (IRST)

Reza Mahalleh Rural District (Persian: دهستان رضا محله) is in the Central District of Rudsar County, Gilan province, Iran. Its capital is the village of Reza Mahalleh.

== Demographics ==
=== Population ===
At the time of the 2006 National Census, the rural district's population was 12,535 in 3,863 households. There were 12,114 inhabitants in 4,063 households at the following census of 2011. The 2016 census measured the population of the rural district as 11,348 in 4,250 households. The most populous of its 54 villages was Kurcheh Posht, with 800 people.

=== Other villages in the rural district ===
- Ali Kalayeh
- Garmejan
- Gilakajan
- Hasanak Sara
- Kaldarreh-ye Olya
- Kaldarreh-ye Sofla
- Kuyeh-ye Sofla
- Lashkajan-e Sofla
