= Central District (Rudsar County) =

District in Gilan province, Iran

Central District (Rudsar County) Persian: بخش مرکزی شهرستان رودسر
- District
- Location within Iran
- Coordinates: 37°08′N 50°17′E
- Country: Iran
- Province: Gilan
- County: Rudsar
- Capital: Rudsar

Population (2016)
  - Total: 58,592
- Time zone: UTC+3:30 (IRST)

The Central District of Rudsar County (Persian: بخش مرکزی شهرستان رودسر) is in Gilan province, Iran. Its capital is the city of Rudsar.

== Demographics ==
=== Population ===
At the time of the 2006 National Census, the district's population was 57,509 in 16,975 households. The following census in 2011 counted 58,548 people in 18,840 households. The 2016 census measured the population of the district as 58,592 inhabitants in 20,772 households.

=== Administrative divisions ===
Central District (Rudsar County) Population
Administrative Divisions	2006	2011	2016
Chini Jan RD	11,653	8,855	9,246
Reza Mahalleh RD	12,535	12,114	11,348
Rudsar (city)	33,321	37,579	37,998
Total	57,509	58,548	58,592
RD = Rural District
