= List of Iranian women =

This is a list of Iranian women, of all Iranian ethnic backgrounds, including both women born in Iran and women who are of the Iranian diaspora.

== Nobel laureates ==
- Shirin Ebadi (born 1947), 2003 Nobel laureate (Nobel Peace Prize)
- Narges Mohammadi (born 1972), 2023 Nobel laureate (Nobel Peace Prize)
Iranian women Nobel laureates

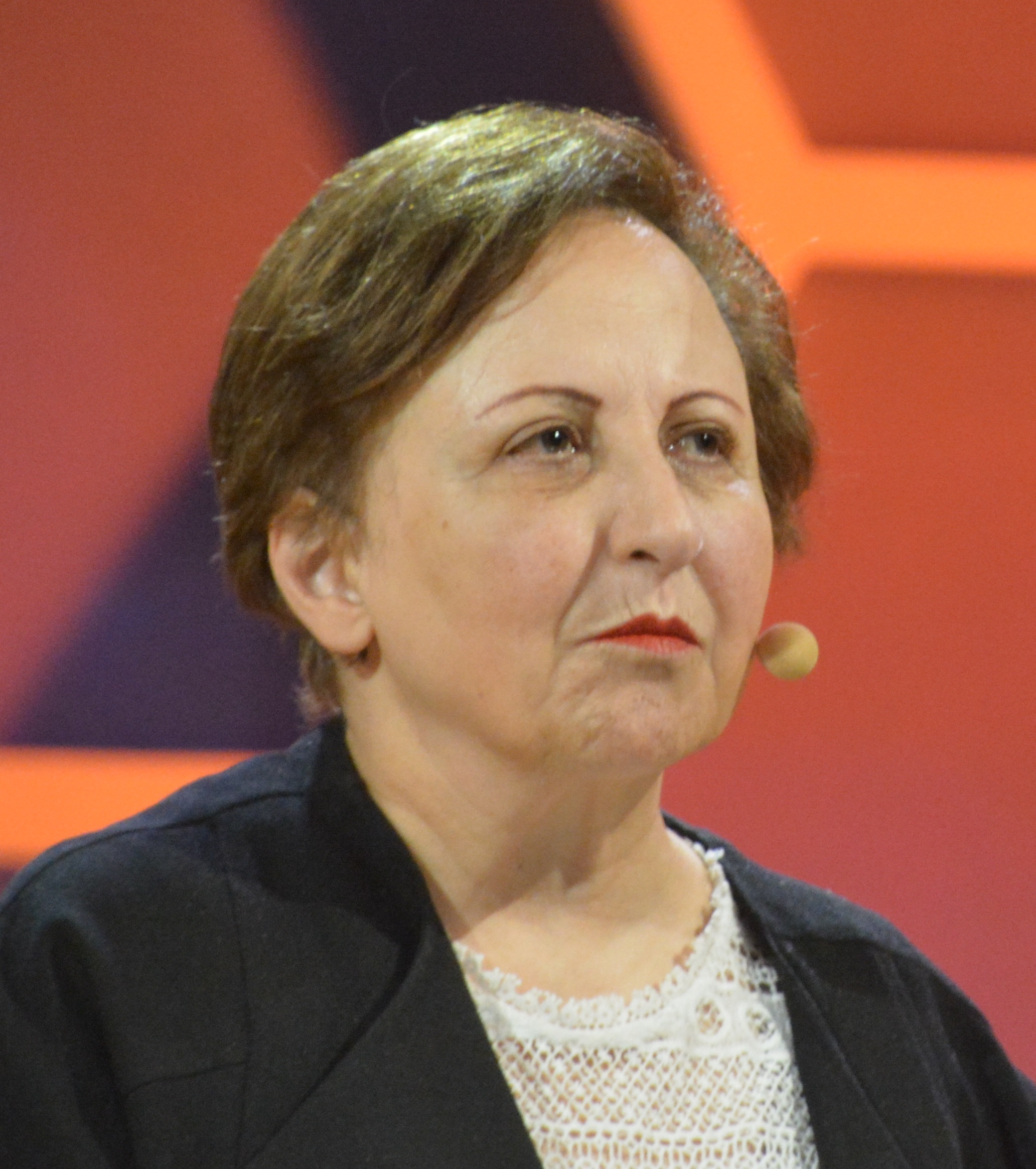

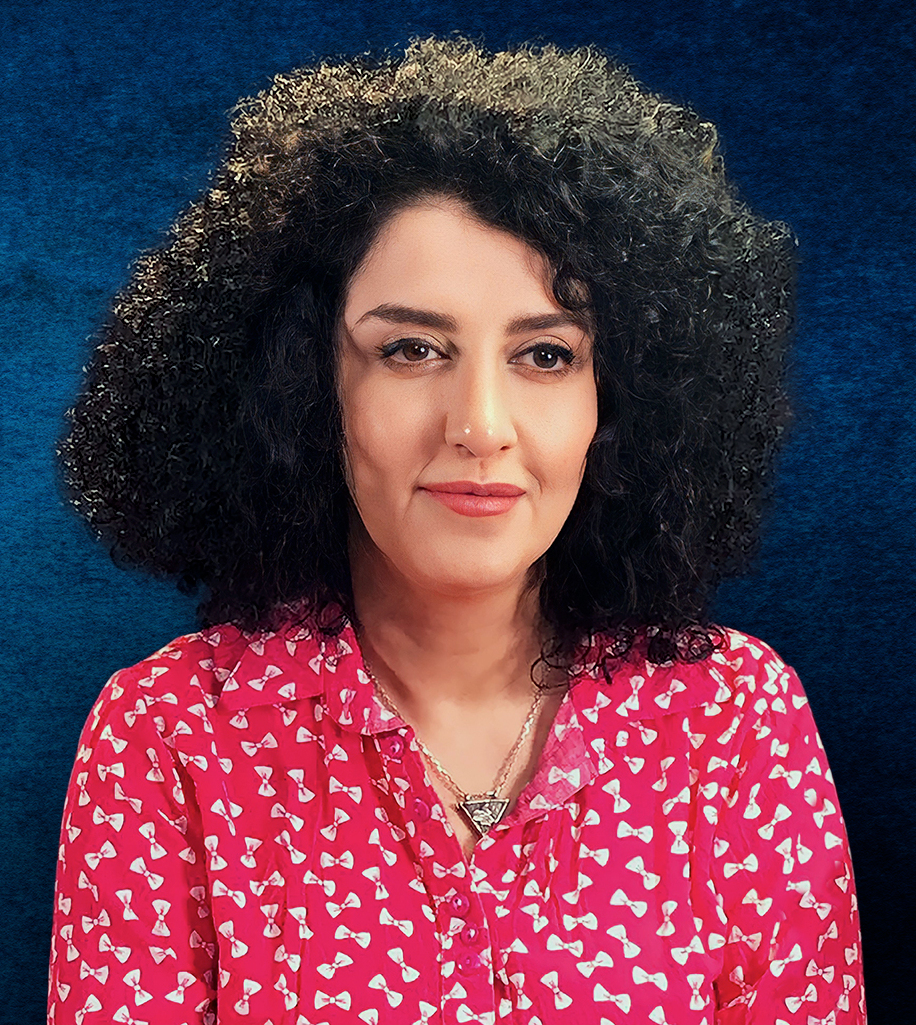

== Scientists and engineers ==
- Azar Andami (1926–1984), physician and bacteriologist noted for her development of a cholera vaccine
- Anousheh Ansari (born 1966), Iranian-American first female space tourist, telecommunication entrepreneur, and namesake of the X Prize
- Elham Azizi (born 1986), Iranian-American biomedical scientist and professor at Columbia University
- Niloufar Bayani (born 1986), wildlife conservation biology researcher and activist; jailed in Iran
- Azita Emami (born 1963), Iranian-American engineer working on low-power mixed-mode circuits in scalable technologies; Professor of Electrical Engineering and Medical Engineering at the California Institute of Technology
- Nikta Fakhri, Iranian-American physics professor at MIT
- Maryam Mirzakhani (1977–2017), mathematician and the first woman to win the Fields Medal, professor of mathematics at Princeton University and Stanford University; moved to California
- Bita Moghaddam, Iranian-American neuroscientist, known for glutamate hyperactivity hypothesis of schizophrenia, professor at Oregon Health & Science University
- Mahta Moghaddam (born 1965), Iranian-American inventor and electrical engineer, known for development of microwave sensing technologies, professor at the University of Southern California
- Maryam Sadeghi (born 1980), Iranian-born Canadian computer scientist and businesswoman in the field of medical image analysis
- Homa Shaibany (born 1913), Iran's first female surgeon
- Alenush Terian (1921–2011), astronomer
- Saba Valadkhan (born c. 1974), Iranian-American biomedical scientist and professor at Case Western Reserve University
Iranian women scientists and engineers

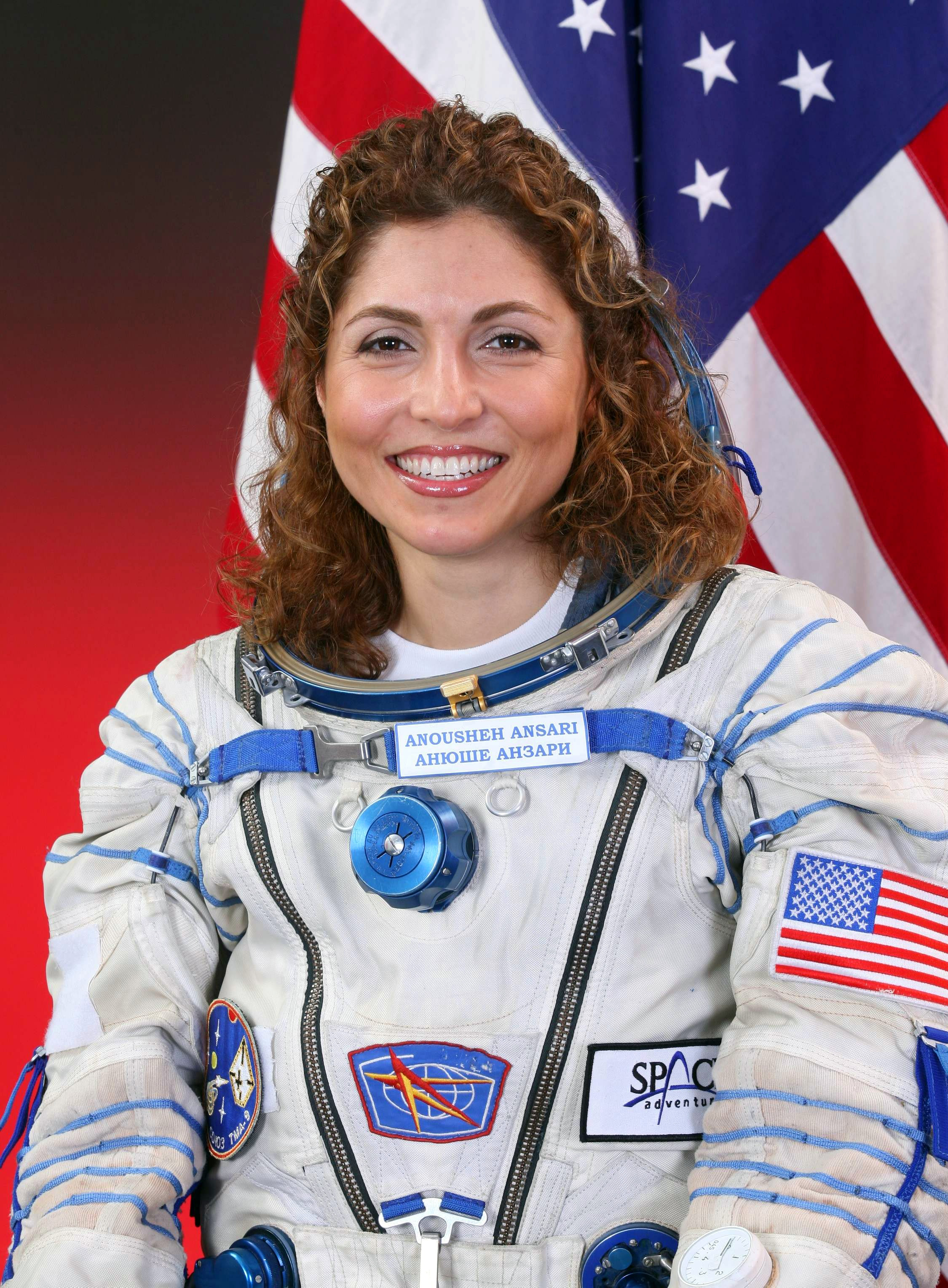

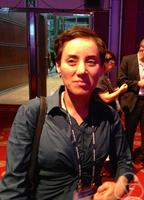

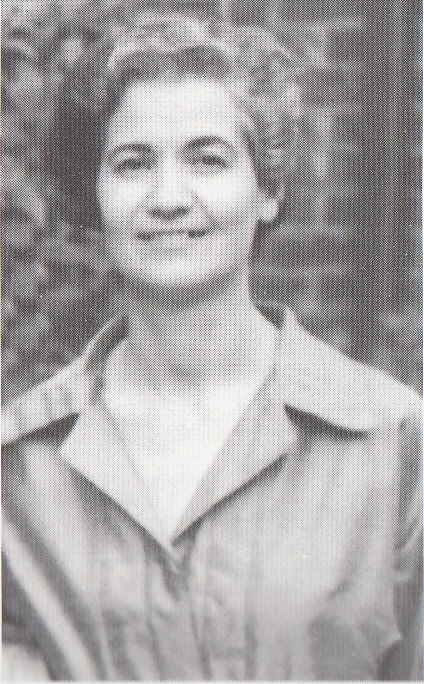

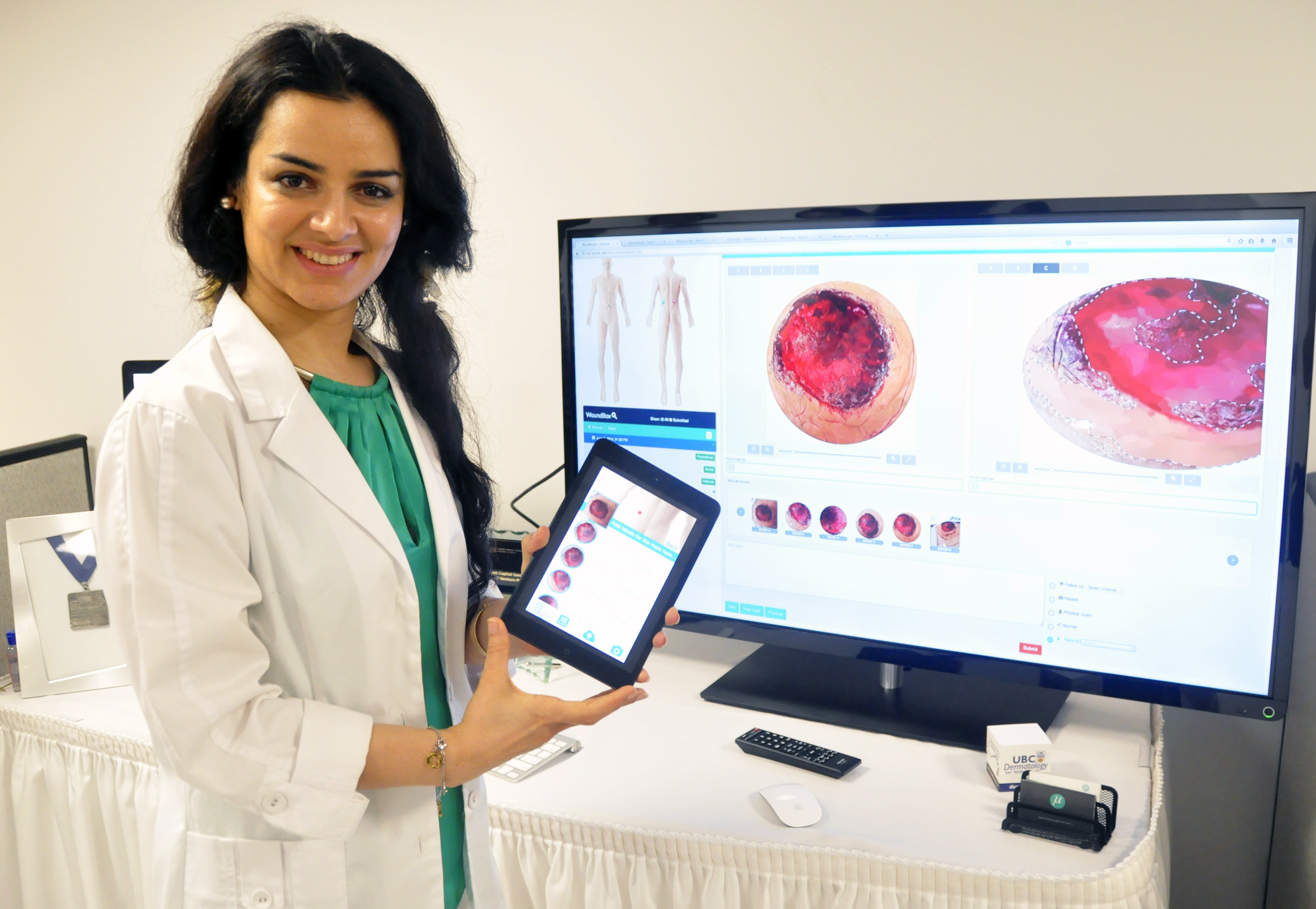

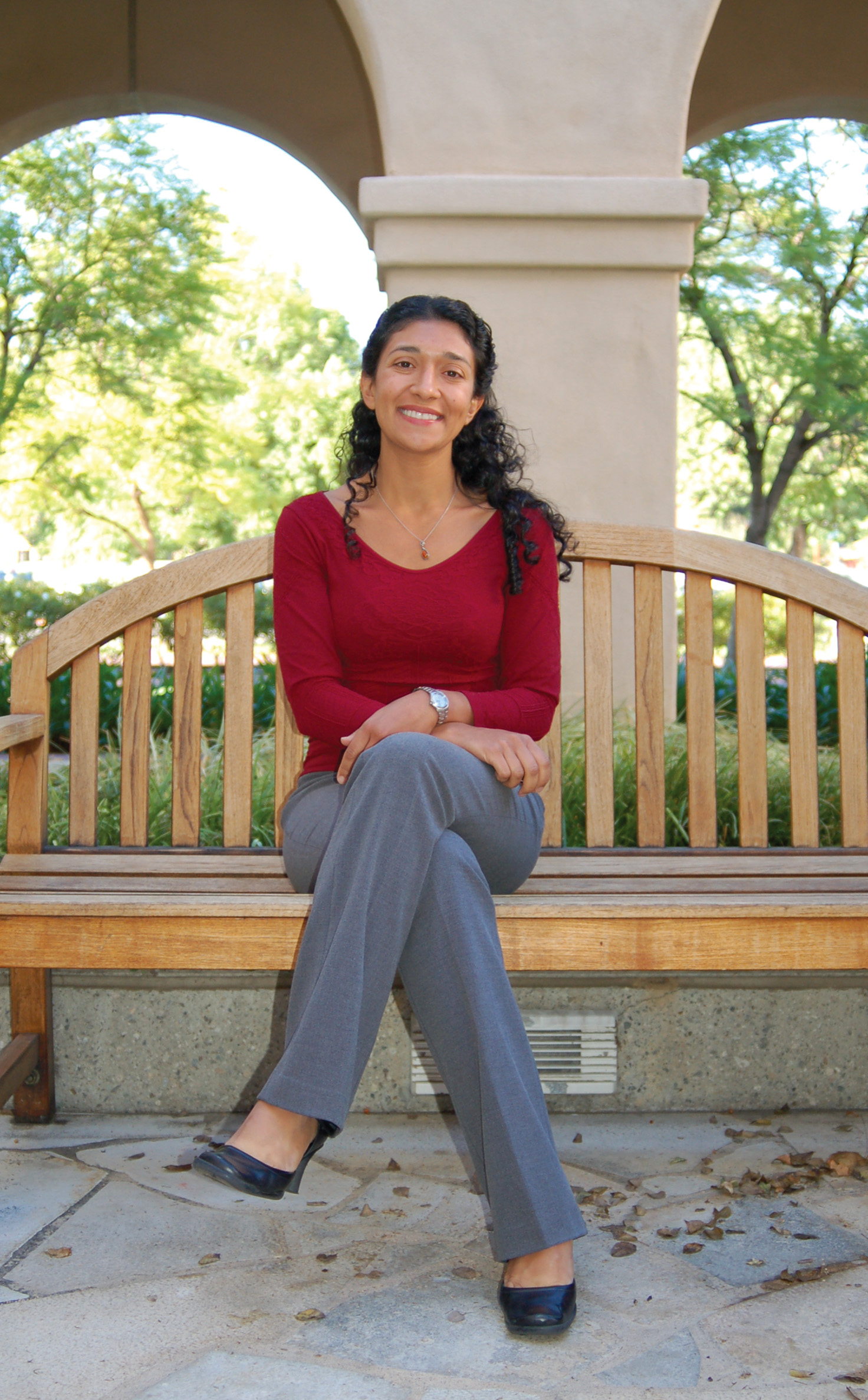

== Academia ==
- Janet Afary (born 1951), Iranian-American activist and researcher in history, religious studies and women studies; teaches at University of California, Santa Barbara
- Lady Amin (1886–1983; also known as Banoo Amin), 20th century jurisprudent, theologian and Muslim mystic
- Jaleh Amouzgar (born 1939), Iranologist, professor and chair at University of Tehran
- Noushafarin Ansari (born 1939), professor in the Faculty of Library and Information Science at University of Tehran; secretary general of Children's Book Council of Iran
- Elham Azizi (born 1986), Iranian-American biomedical scientist and professor at Columbia University
- Roksana Bahramitash (born 1956), Iranian-born Canadian sociologist, author, and professor at the University of Montreal
- Mina Bissell, Iranian-American biochemist, Director of University of California, Berkeley Life Sciences Division
- Shirin Ebadi (born 1947), lawyer, lecturer at Tehran University (2003 Nobel laureate)
- Azita Emami, Iranian-American engineer working on low-power mixed-mode circuits in scalable technologies; Professor of Electrical Engineering and Medical Engineering at California Institute of Technology
- Farideh Heyat (born 1949), British-Iranian anthropologist and writer; retired lecturer of SOAS, University of London and American University of Central Asia
- Marjan Jahangiri (born 1962), Iranian-British professor of cardiac surgery at St George's, University of London, first female professor of cardiac surgery in the United Kingdom and Europe
- Firoozeh Kashani-Sabet (born 1967), American-Iranian Professor of History at the University of Pennsylvania; novelist
- Fatemeh Keshavarz (born 1952), Iranian-American chair of Asian and Near Eastern Languages and Literature Department, professor of Persian and Comparative Literature, Washington University in St. Louis
- Elaheh Koulaei (born 1956), professor of political science, Faculty of Law and Political Sciences, Tehran University; politician
- Amy Malek (born c. 1979/1980), Iranian-American scholar, and sociocultural anthropologist at Oklahoma State University, Stillwater
- Farzaneh Milani (born 1947), Iranian-born American director of Studies in Women and Gender; professor of Persian and Women Studies at the University of Virginia in Charlottesville, Virginia, United States
- Maryam Mirzakhani (1977–2017), mathematician, Fields Medal (2014), professor at Princeton University and Stanford University; moved to California
- Valentine Moghadam (born 1952), Iranian-American professor of Sociology and International Affairs; Director of International Affairs Program and Director of Middle East Studies Program, Northeastern University
- Bita Moghaddam, Iranian-American neuroscientist, Ruth Matarazzo Professor of Behavioral Neuroscience at Oregon Health & Science University, former Professor at Yale University and the University of Pittsburgh
- Mahta Moghaddam (born 1965), Iranian-American William M. Hogue Professor of Electrical Engineering in the Department of Electrical and Computer Engineering at the University of Southern California
- Azar Nafisi (born 1948), Iranian-American former lecturer at Tehran University and Johns Hopkins University
- Afsaneh Najmabadi (born 1946), Iranian-born American Professor of History and of Studies of Women, Gender, and Sexuality at Harvard University
- Nasrin Rahimieh (born 1958), Iranian-born American writer of Iranian culture and Persian literature; professor of Comparative Literature at the University of California, Irvine
- Zahra Rahnavard (born 1945), first female chancellor of a university, Alzahra University (1998–2006) after the Iranian Revolution, was under house arrest from 2011 to 2018
- Pardis Sabeti (born 1975), Iranian-American geneticist at Harvard Medical School
- Reihaneh Safavi-Naini, Iranian-Canadian cryptographer; professor of computer science; head of the Telecommunications and Information Technology Research Institute at the University of Wollongong
- Fatemeh Shams (born 1983), teaching Persian literature at the University of Pennsylvania and at Oxford University, lives in the United States
- Saba Soomekh (born 1976), Iranian-born American professor of religious studies at UCLA and Loyola Marymount University
- Nayereh Tohidi (born 1951), Iranian-born American professor and Chair of the Women's Studies Department at California State University, Northridge; research associate at the Center for Near Eastern Studies at UCLA, US
- Tali Farhadian Weinstein (born in 1975 or 1976), Iranian-born American attorney, professor at Columbia Law School and NYU Law School, and politician
Iranian women in academia

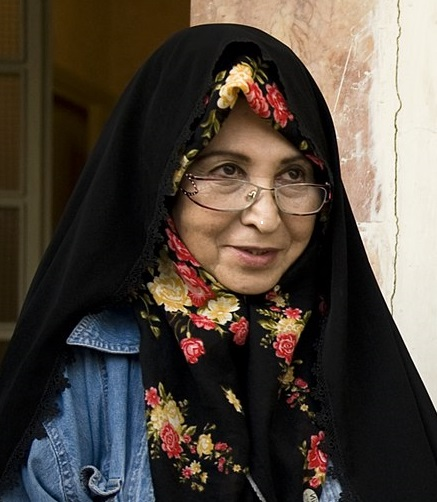

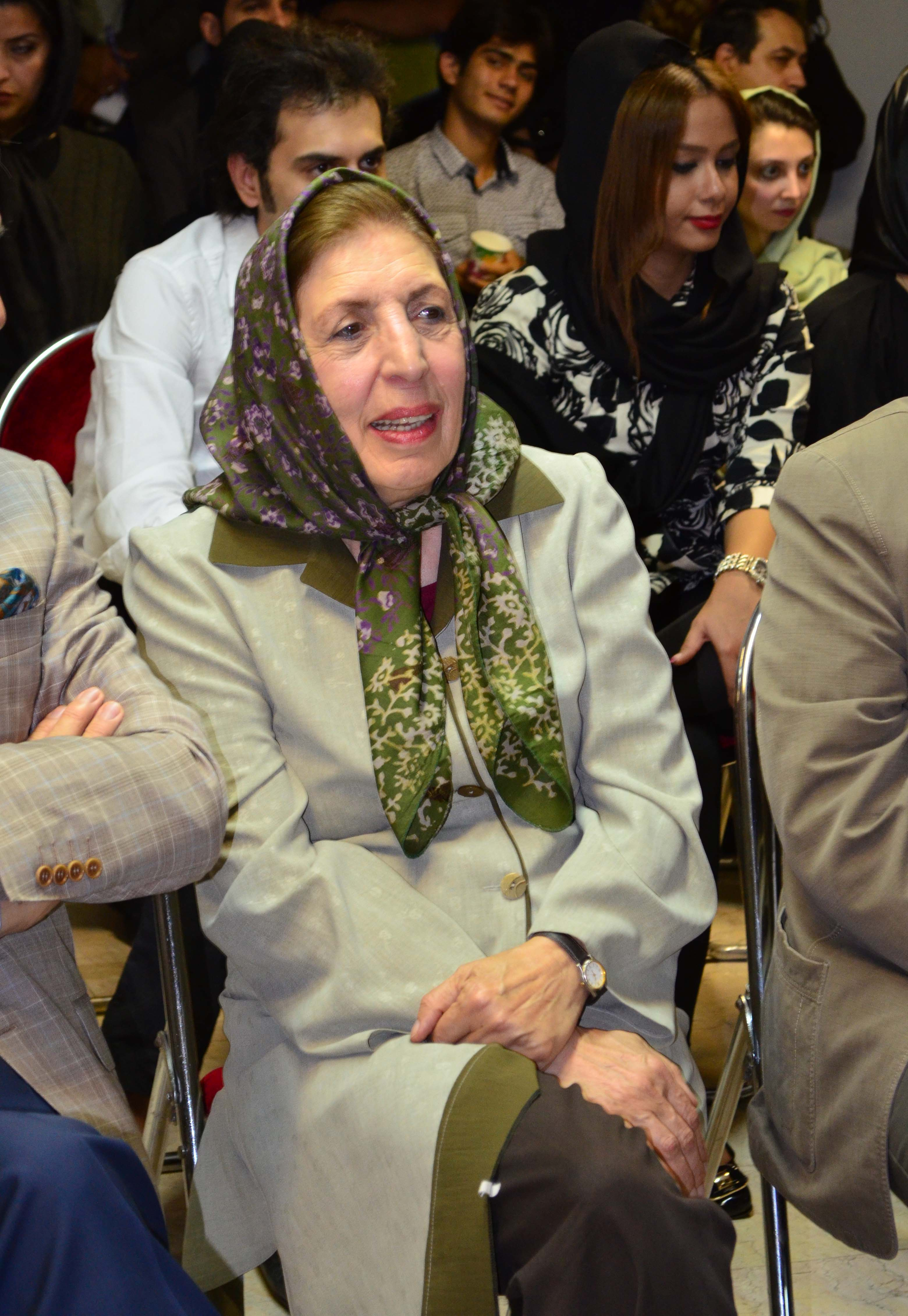

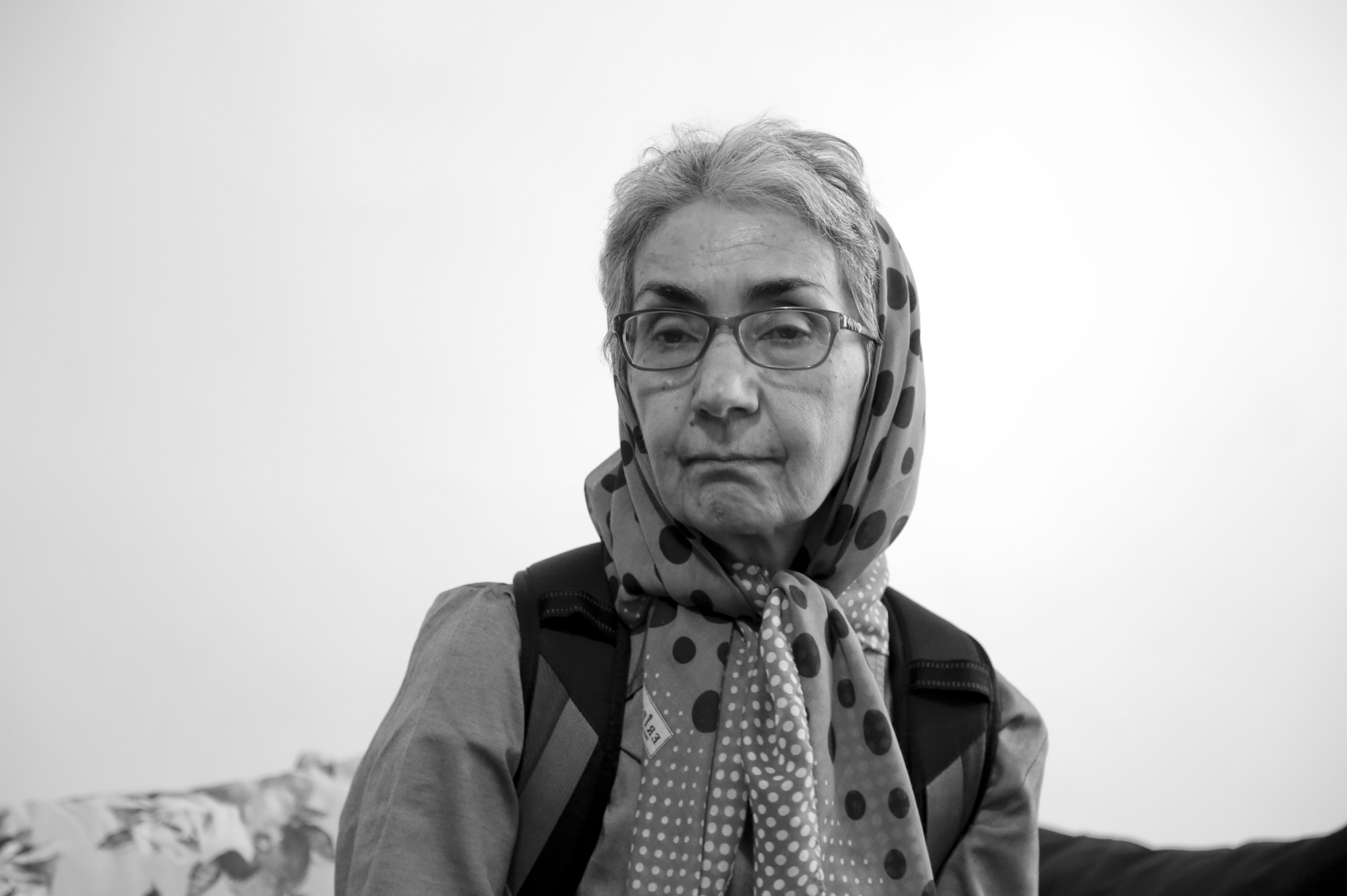

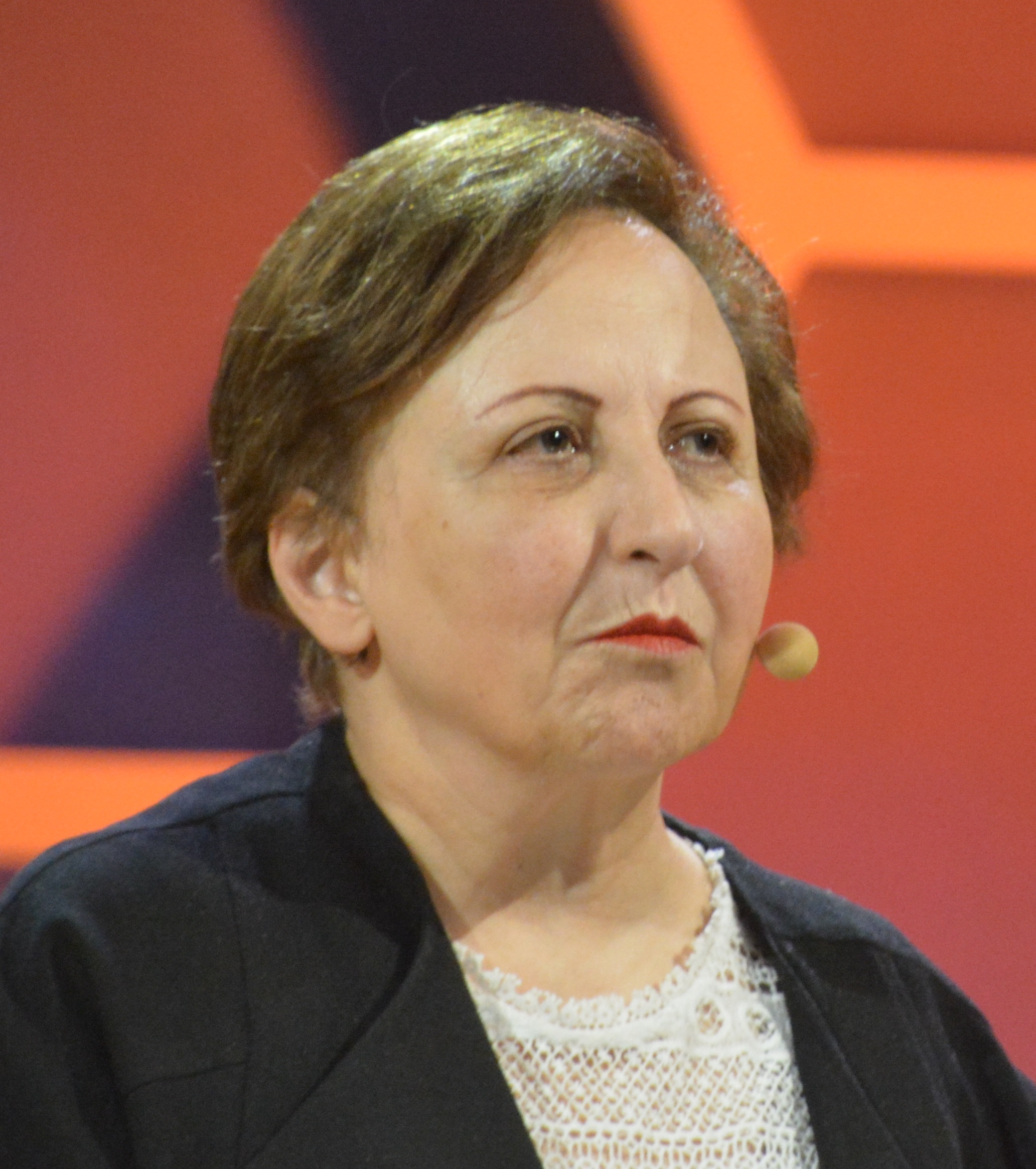

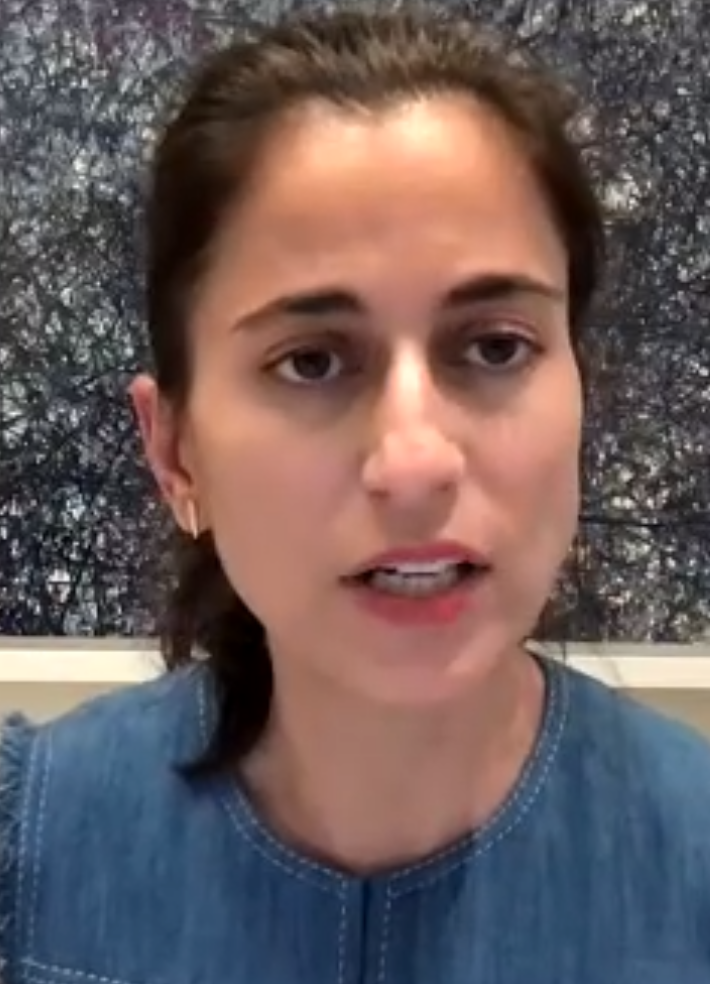

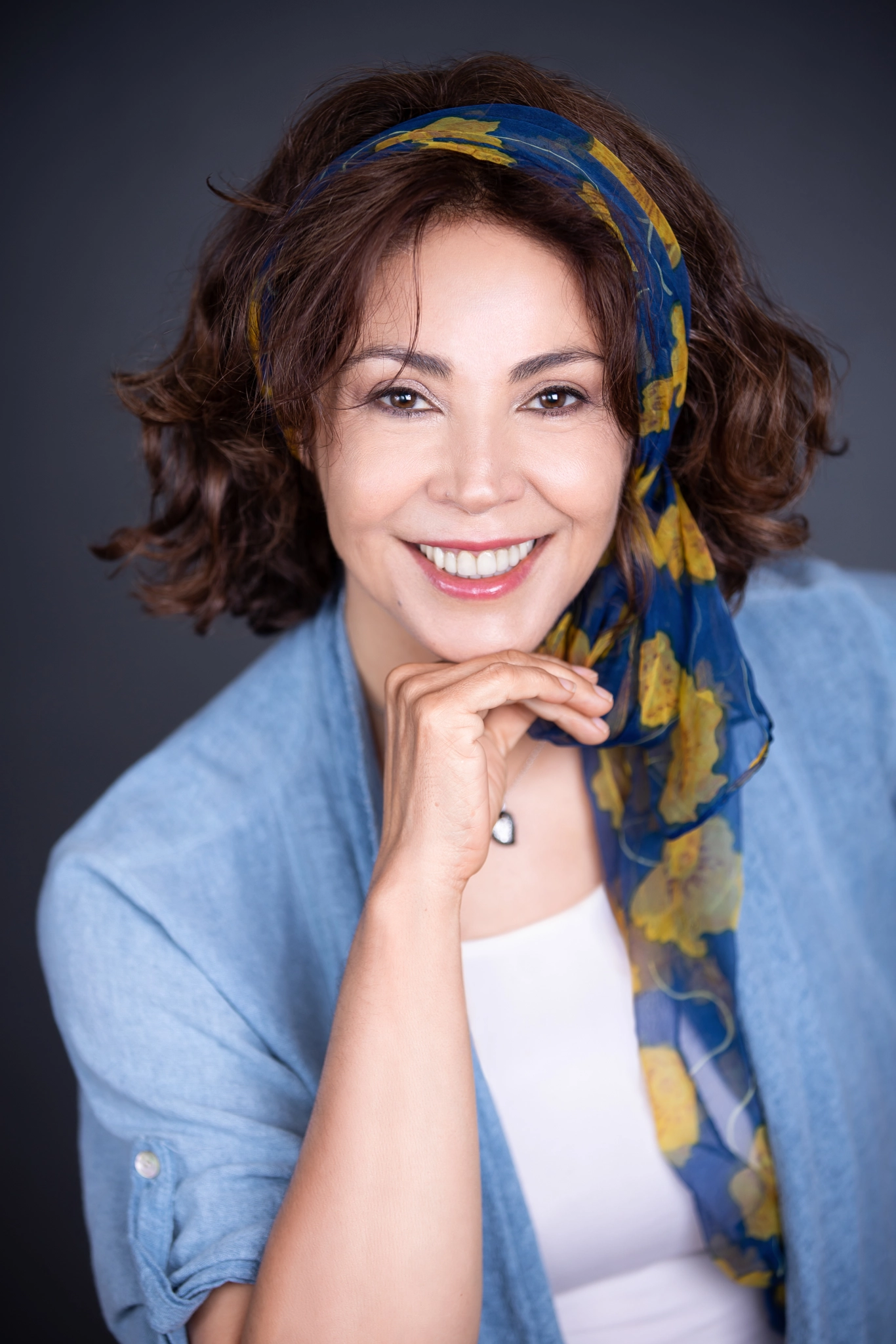

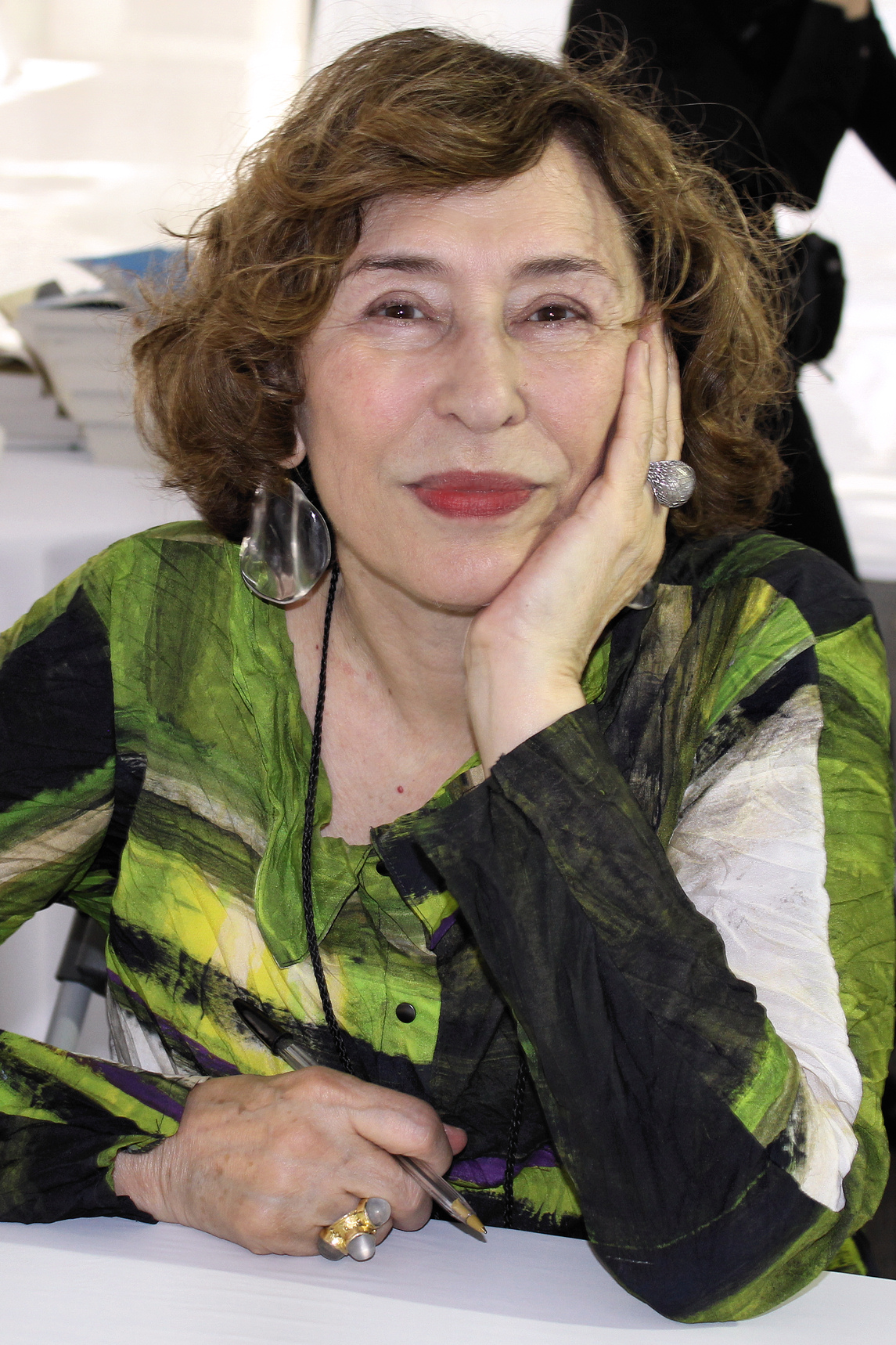

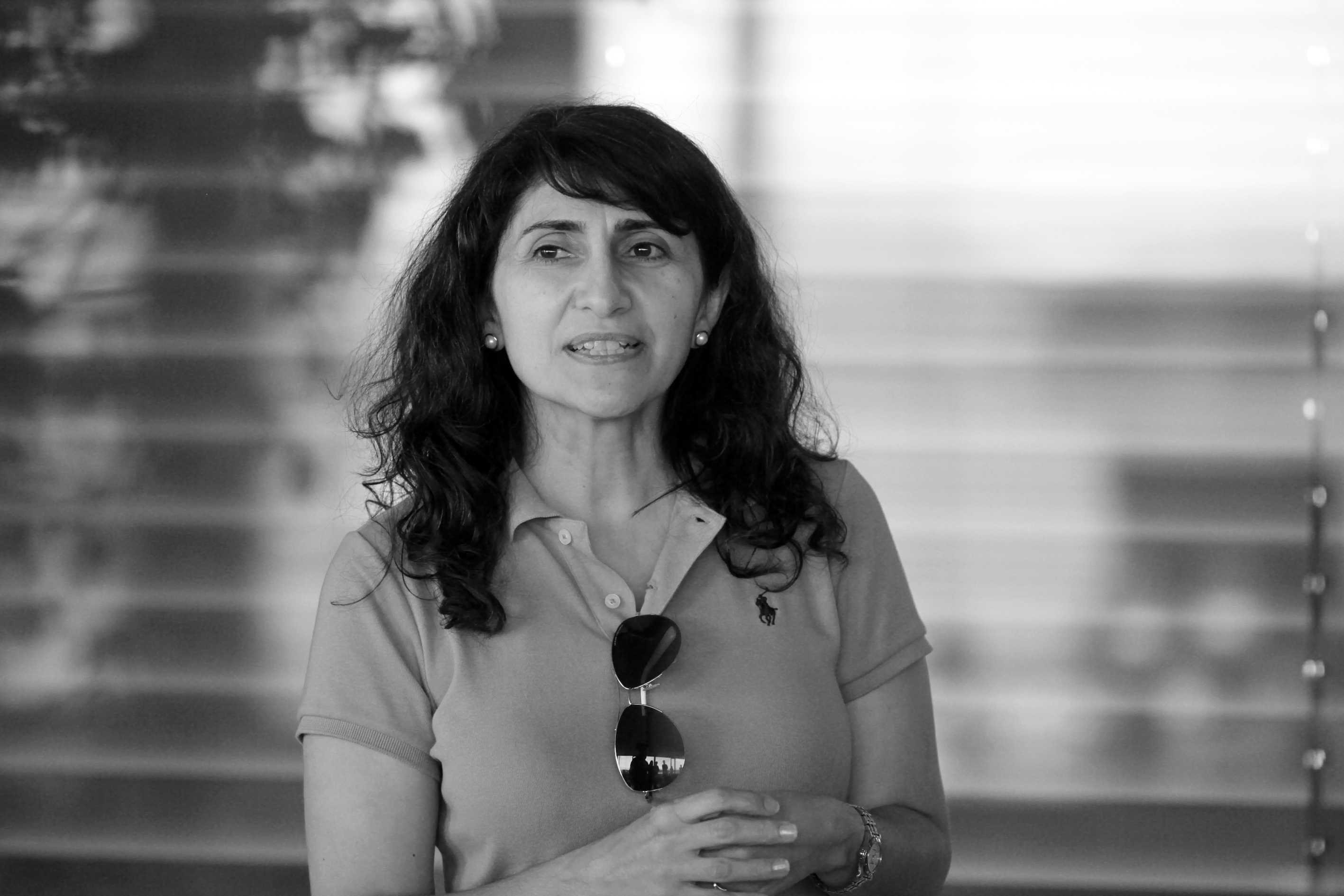

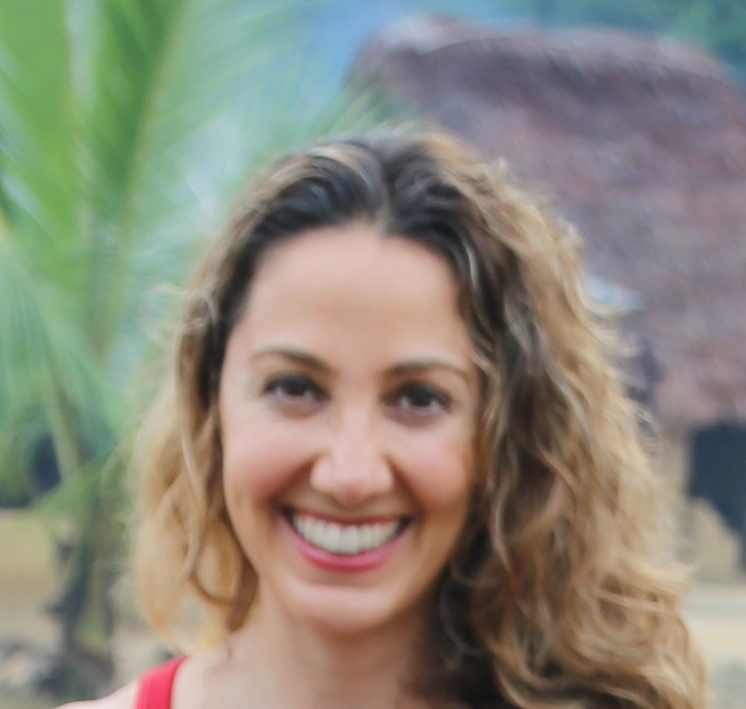

== Activists ==
- Mahnaz Afkhami (born 1941), Iranian-American politician and human rights and women's rights activist, served in the Cabinet of Iran (1976–78)
- Nazanin Afshin-Jam (born 1979), Iranian-Canadian human rights activist, author and public speaker, and former Miss World Canada
- Neda Agha-Soltan (1983–2009), shot and killed during the 2009 Iranian election protests; her name quickly became a rallying cry for the opposition
- Shiva Nazar Ahari (born 1984), human rights activist, journalist, co-founder of Committee of Human Rights Reporters, jailed several times in Evin Prison; moved to Slovenia
- Bibi Khatoon Astarabadi (1858–1921), author and pioneer of the Persian women's movement in modern Iran
- Forough Azarakhshi (1904–1963), established the first elementary and secondary schools for girls in Mashhad, Iran
- Homa Darabi (1940–1994), Iranian-American political activist against forced hijab, affiliated with the secular Nation Party of Iran; professor of child psychiatry, physician; set herself on fire in Tehran's Tajrish Square to protest Iran's restrictions of women's rights
- Parvin Darabi (born 1941), Iranian–American author and women's rights activist; speaks out against Iran's regime and Islam
- Nitsana Darshan-Leitner (born 1973), Israeli attorney, human rights activist, and founder of Shurat HaDin–Israeli Law Center
- Sediqeh Dowlatabadi (1882–1961), feminist activist, journalist, educator, a pioneering figure in the Persian women's movement
- Shirin Ebadi (born 1947), human rights lawyer, activist, and judge, 2003 Nobel Peace Prize laureate, lives in London
- Zahra Eshraghi (born 1964), feminist activist, granddaughter of Ayatollah Khomeini
- Parvaneh Eskandari (1939–1998), political activist, writer, and Dariush Forouhar's wife; murdered during the chain murders of Iran in 1998
- Roya Hakakian (born 1966), Iranian-American Jewish human rights activist, poet, journalist, and writer
- Faezeh Hashemi (born 1963), journalist, women's rights activist, and former member of Iranian parliament (1996–2000), daughter of the late former president of Iran Akbar Hashemi Rafsanjani, is currently imprisoned in Evin Prison for her advocacy
- Shamsi Hekmat (1917–1997), Iranian-American educator, philanthropist, pioneered reforms in women's status in Iran
- Sheema Kalbasi (born 1972), Iranian-Danish-American human rights activist, author, poet, and filmmaker
- Mehrangiz Kar (born 1944), human rights lawyer, author, and Iranian dissident, formerly incarcerated in Evin Prison, lives in the United States
- Zahra Kazemi (1948–2003), Iranian-Canadian freelance photographer, arrested for taking photos of a protest and beaten and slain in custody in Evin Prison while a political prisoner
- Shahla Lahiji (1942 –2024), feminist and human rights activist, writer, publisher, and translator, formerly incarcerated in Evin Prison
- Lily Mazahery (born 1972), Iranian-American human rights activist, disbarred attorney
- Narges Mohammadi (born 1972), Nobel Peace Prize laureate, human rights activist and vice president of the Defenders of Human Rights Center, physicist and engineer; imprisoned primarily in Evin Prison and Zanjan Prison, has faced cumulative sentences totaling over 30 years, remains imprisoned in Evin Prison
- Rayehe Mozafarian (born 1986), women's and children's rights activist, researcher; the founder of Stop FGM Iran, focused on eliminating female genital mutilation
- Maryam Namazie (born 1966), British–Iranian secularist, communist and human rights activist, writer, commentator, and broadcaster; vocal critic of Islamism and sharia law; the leader of the Council of Ex-Muslims of Britain
- Sharon Nazarian (born 1967), Iranian-born American social activist, academic, clinical psychologist, and philanthropist
- Marina Nemat (born 1965), Canadian–Iranian human rights activist, past political prisoner and memoirist, imprisoned for over two years in Evin Prison
- Asra Panahi (2007–2022), fifteen-year-old girl beaten and killed during the Mahsa Amini protests
- Maryam Rajavi (born 1953), president of the National Council of Resistance of Iran; leader of the People's Mujahedin of Iran, lives in France
- Shadi Sadr (born 1974), lawyer, human rights advocate, essayist and journalist, incarcerated in Evin Prison, lives in Germany
- Azadeh Shahshahani (born 1979), Iranian–American human rights lawyer and former president of the National Lawyers Guild
- Shahla Sherkat (born 1956), writer, publisher, editor; a pioneer of the women's movement in modern Iran
- Nasrin Sotoudeh (born 1963), human rights lawyer for opposition activists, women protesting mandatory hijab laws, juveniles facing the death penalty, and politicians; imprisoned multiple times in Evin Prison and Qarchak Prison, served a 3-year term, was re-arrested to serve an accumulated 38-year sentence
- Iran Teymourtash (1914–1991), journalist and early activist; daughter of Abdolhossein Teymourtash; moved to France
- Elham Youssefian (born 1980), Iranian-American human rights lawyer and disability rights advocate
Iranian women activists

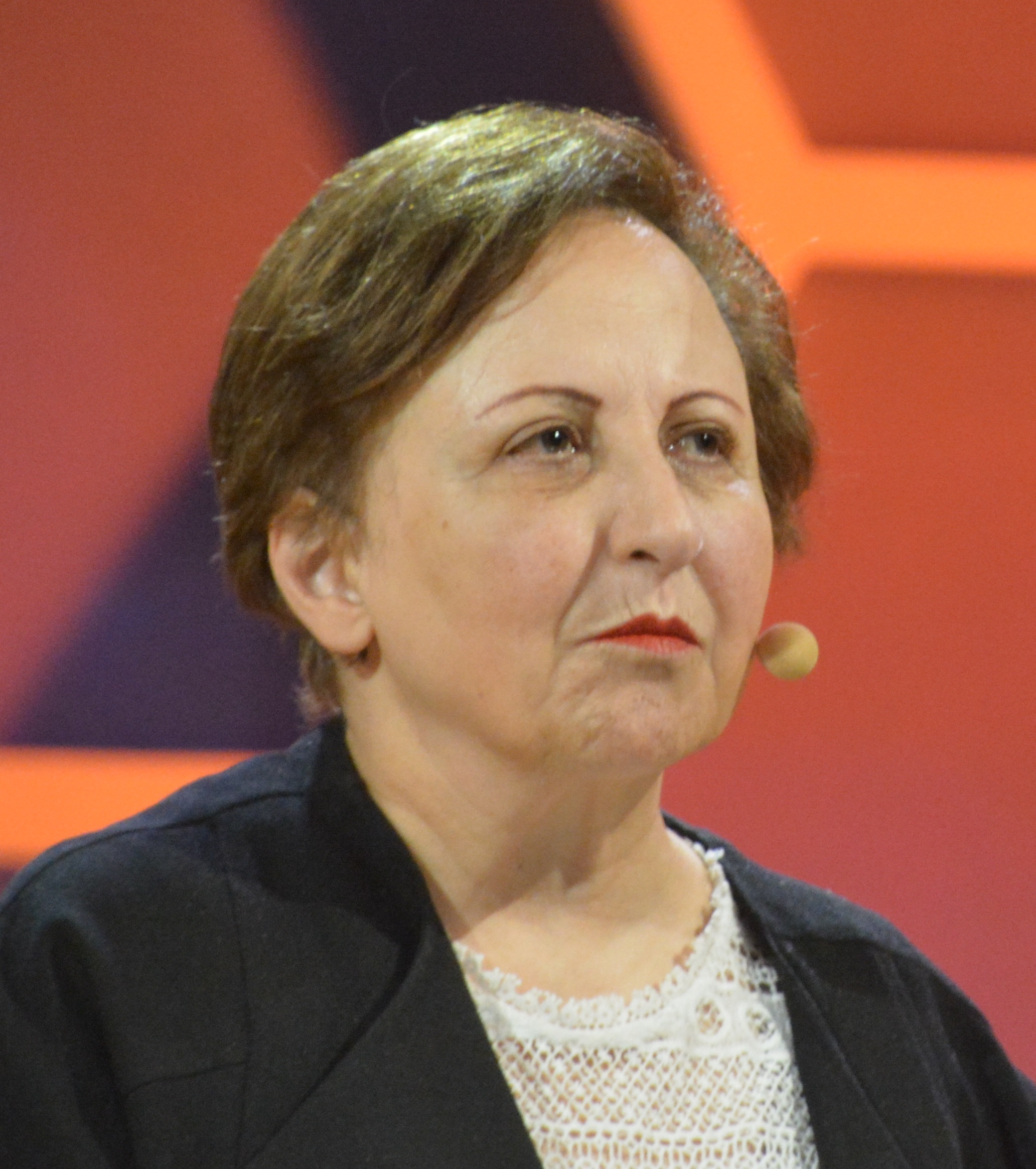

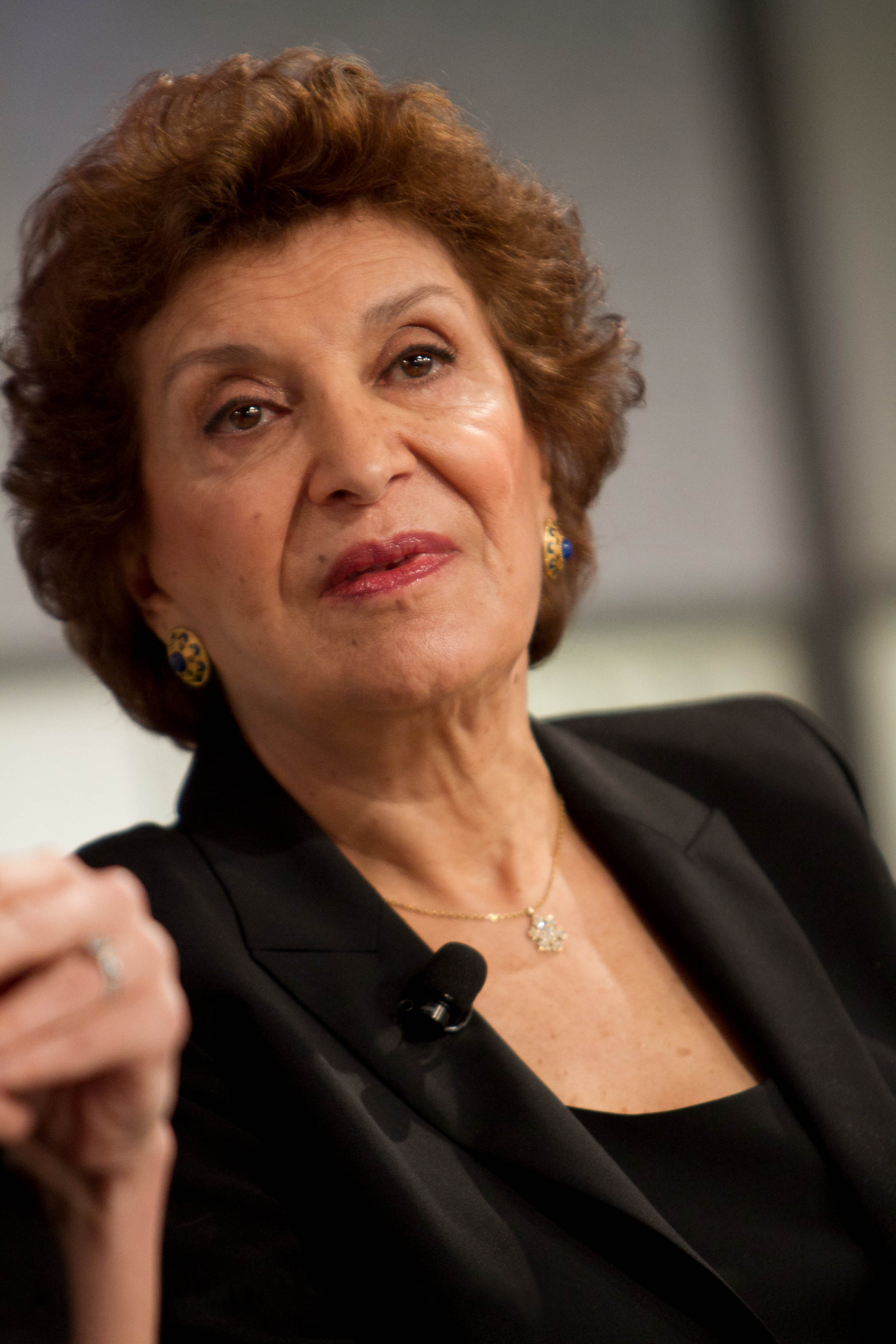

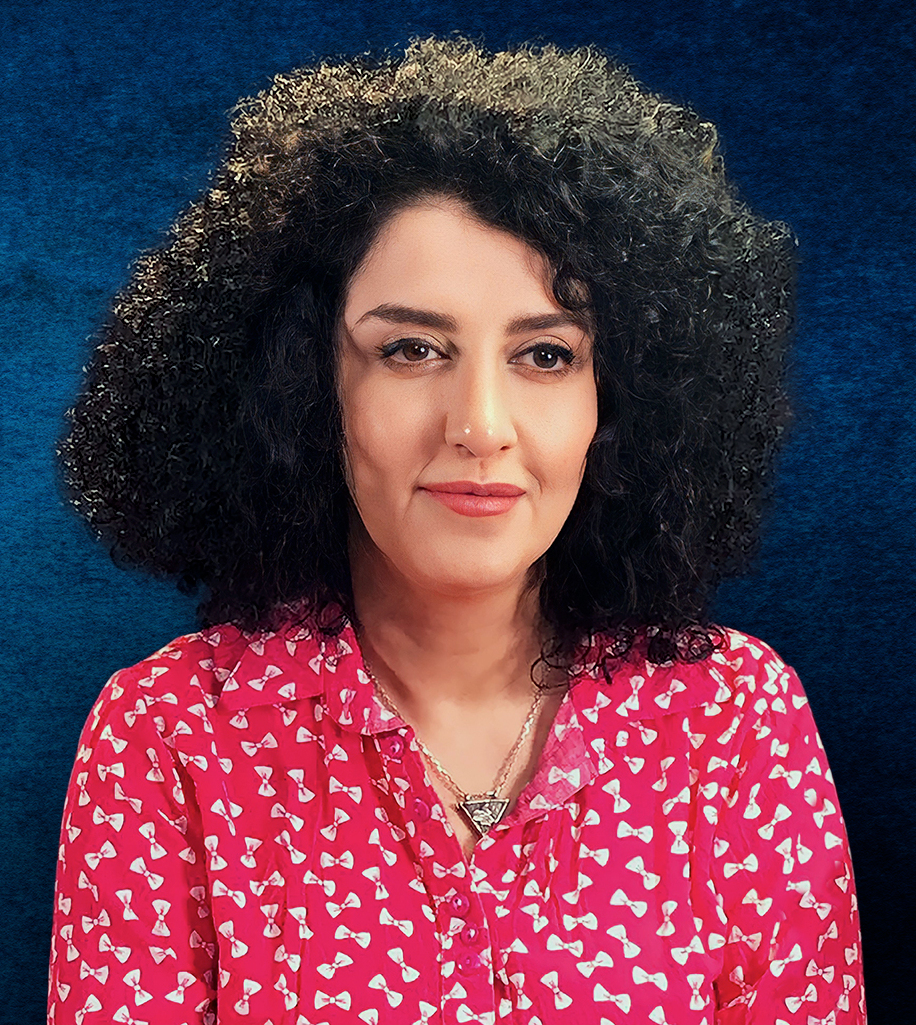

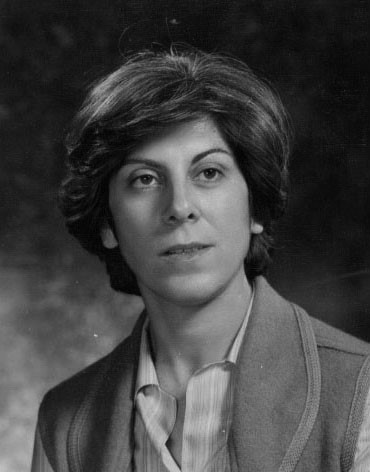

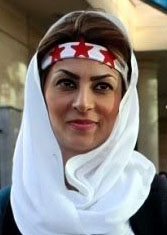

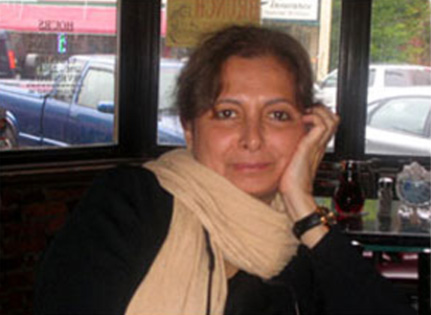

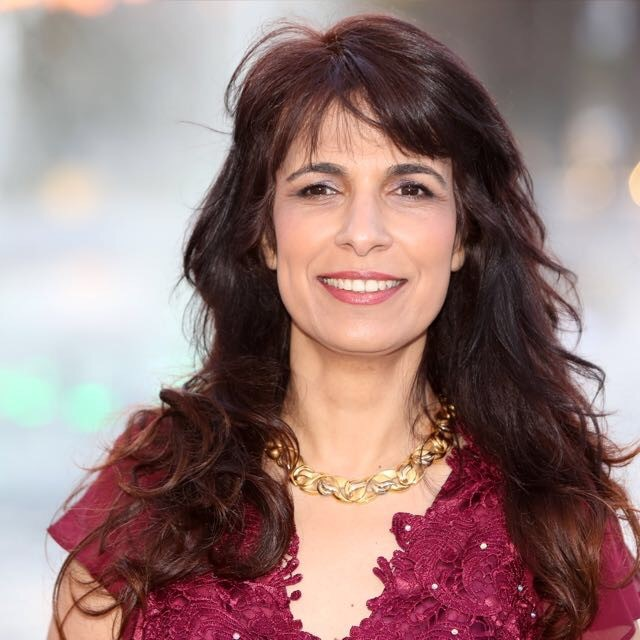

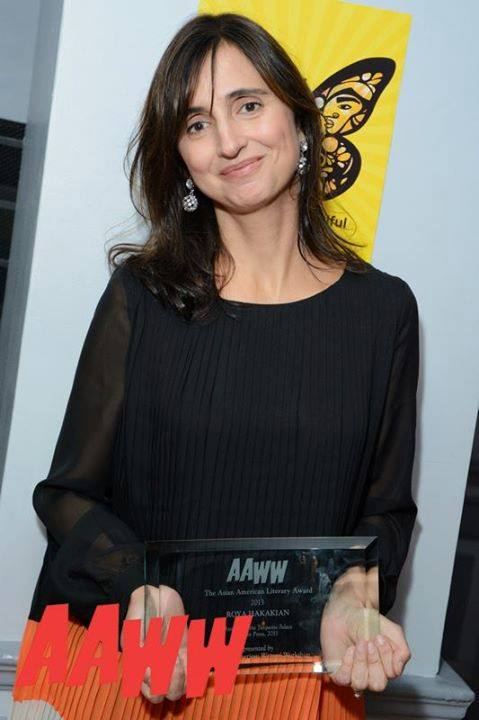

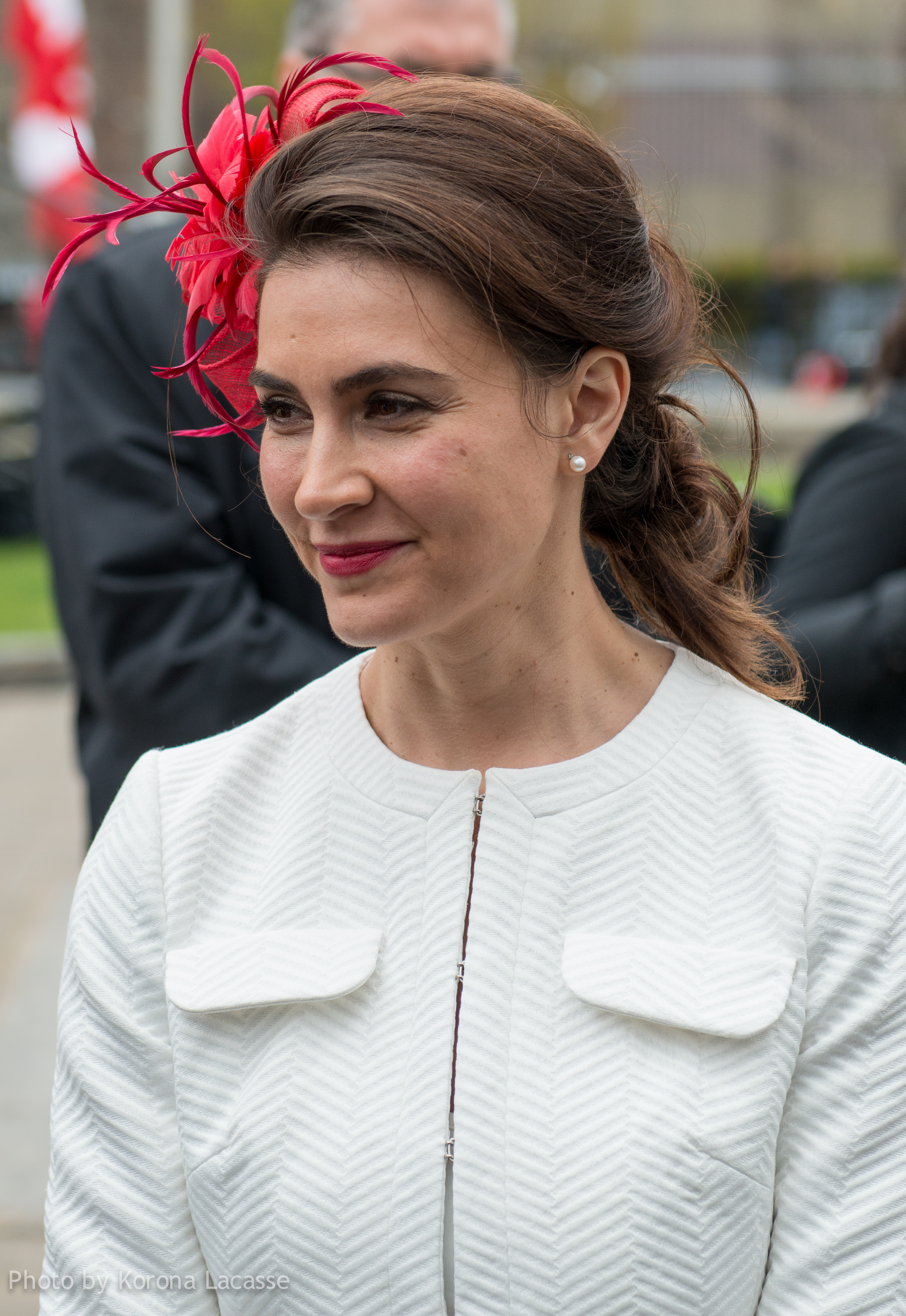

== Prisoners and detainees ==
- Fariba Adelkhah (born 1959), French-Iranian anthropologist, imprisoned for over 3 years in Evin Prison for allegedly conspiring against national security and engaging in propaganda
- Parastoo Ahmadi (born 1997), singer, sang while not wearing a hijab, arrested and convicted of offending "public decency through the production and publication of obscene and immoral content," sentenced by a criminal court to 74 lashes
- Mahsa Amini (1999–2022), arrested by the Guidance Patrol for allegedly not wearing the hijab in accordance with government standards, and died in police custody in Vozara Detention Center amid assertions of police brutality
- Marziyeh Amirizadeh (born 1979), Iranian-American author imprisoned in Evin Prison and sentenced to execution by hanging for converting to Christianity; later tortured, and released after 259 days
- Zahra Bahrami (1965–2011), dual Dutch and Iranian citizen arrested during a political protest, imprisoned in Evin Prison, and later convicted for drug trafficking and executed by hanging
- Marjan Davari (born 1966), researcher, translator and writer studying, teaching, translating and researching new age material, philosophical and metaphysical texts, held in Evin Prison and Qarchak Prison and sentenced to death for "spreading corruption on earth" by promoting new age cults and movements from eastern cultures such as Tibetan Buddhism, Hinduism, and Eckankar; imprisoned since 2015
- Zahra Amir Ebrahimi (born 1981), Iranian-French photographer, television actress, subject of a 2006 sex tape scandal in Iran, sentenced to 6 months in prison and 90 lashes
- Haleh Esfandiari (born 1940), Iranian-American scholar, former Director of the Middle East Program at the Woodrow Wilson International Center for Scholars, detained in Evin Prison for over 3 months
- Nazanin Fatehi (born 1987), controversially sentenced to death by hanging for murder
- Zeynab Jalaliyan (born 1982), Kurdish prisoner, initially sentenced to death for "enmity against God" (moharebeh) due to alleged political alignment with Kurdish groups, held in Yazd Central Prison since 2008
- Zahra Kazemi-Ahmadabadi (1948–2003), Iranian-Canadian freelance photojournalist arrested, raped, tortured, and killed while in custody in Evin Prison
- Sharifeh Mohammadi (born 1979), social activist and political prisoner sentenced to death, held in Lakan Prison
- Verisheh Moradi (born c. 1985/86), political prisoner and women's rights activist sentenced to death and imprisoned in Sanandaj Prison and Evin Prison since 2023
- Taraneh Mousavi (1981–2009), arrested for protesting the 2009 election results, died after being sexually abused while in custody
- Roxana Saberi (born 1977), American journalist for CBS News, held prisoner in Evin Prison and sentenced to an 8-year prison term under accusations of espionage, released after 101 days
- Zahra Tabari (born c. 1958), electrical engineer and activist sentenced to death by hanging on charges of "armed rebellion" after she was found to possess a cloth printed with the "Woman, Life, Freedom" slogan, held in Lakan Prison since 2025
- Zahra Bani Yaghoub (1980–2007), medical doctor, arrested by the Guidance Patrol for breaching modesty laws by sitting in a park with her fiance, died in prison in Hamedan
- Nazanin Zaghari-Ratcliffe (born 1978), British-Iranian imprisoned for 5 years after being found guilty of "plotting to topple the Iranian government"
Iranian women prisoners and detainees

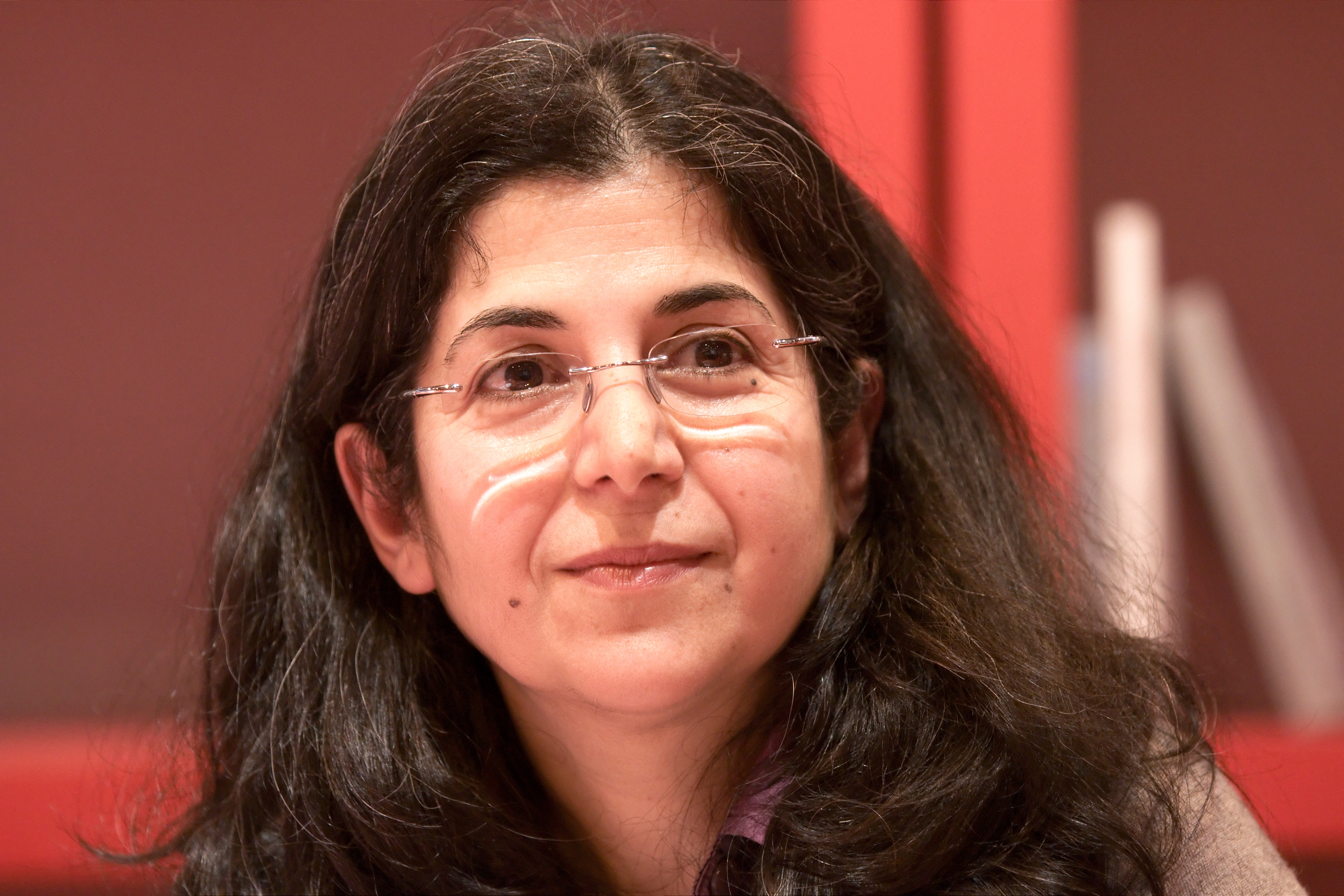

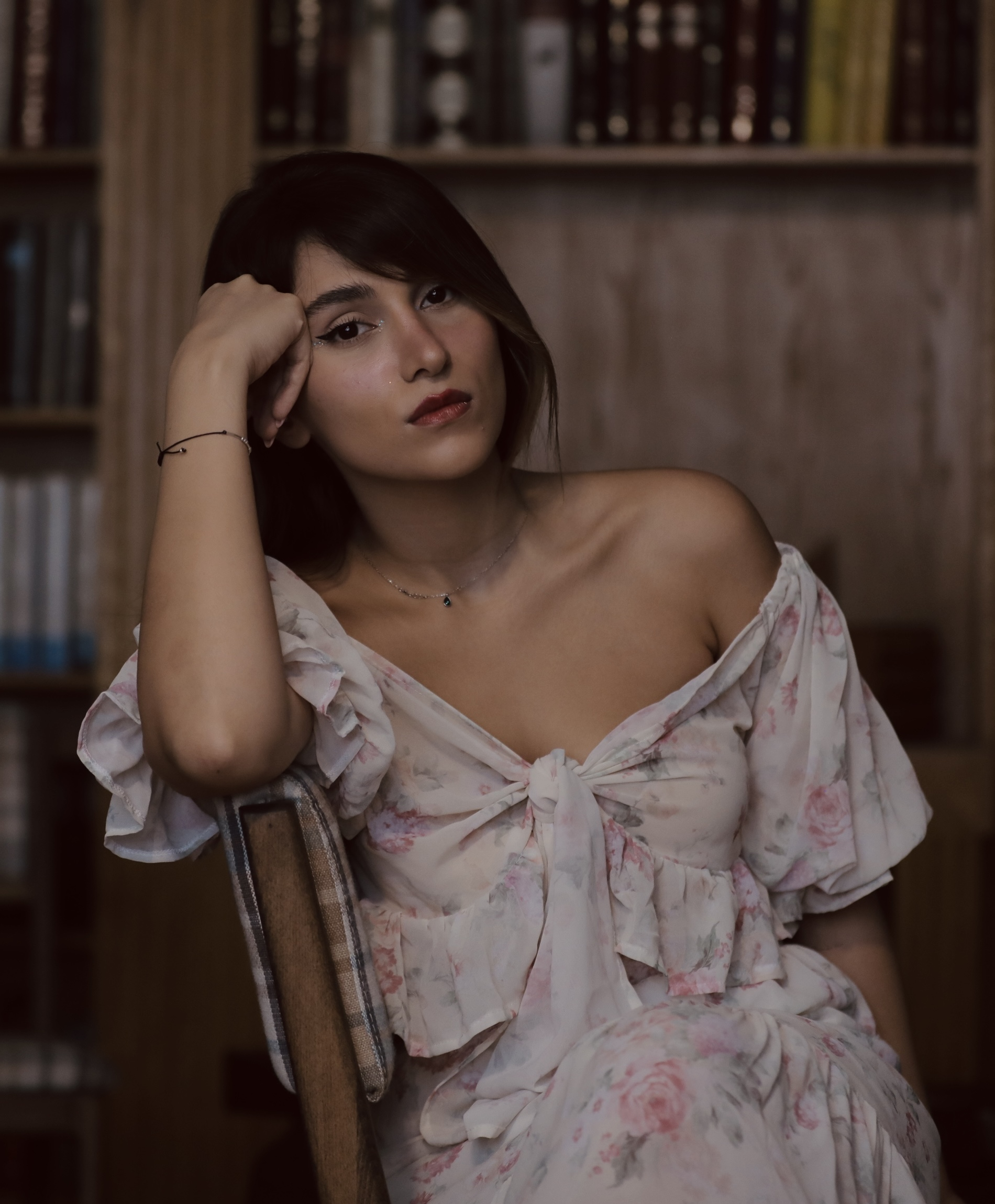

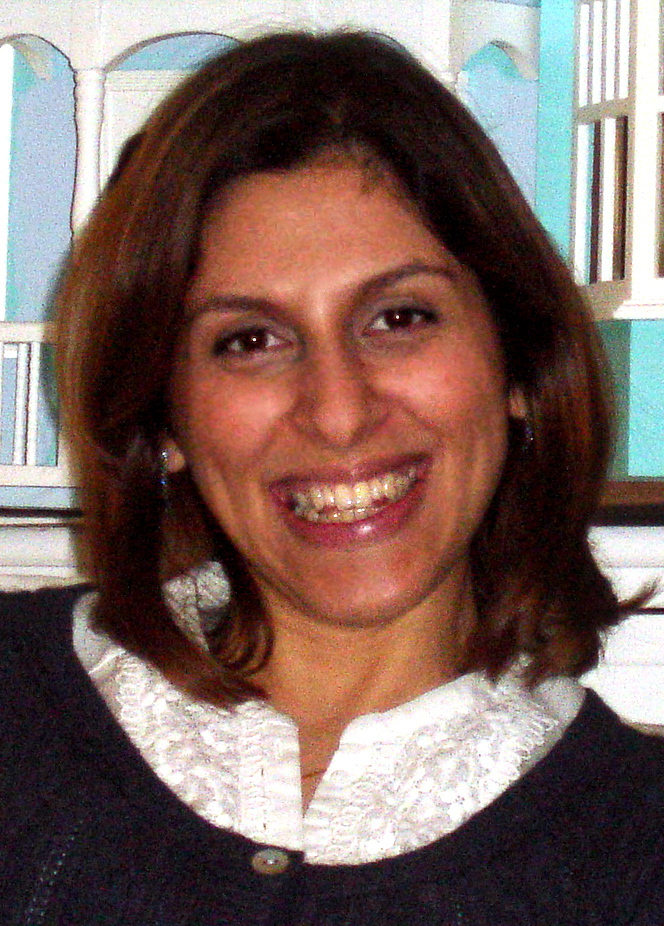

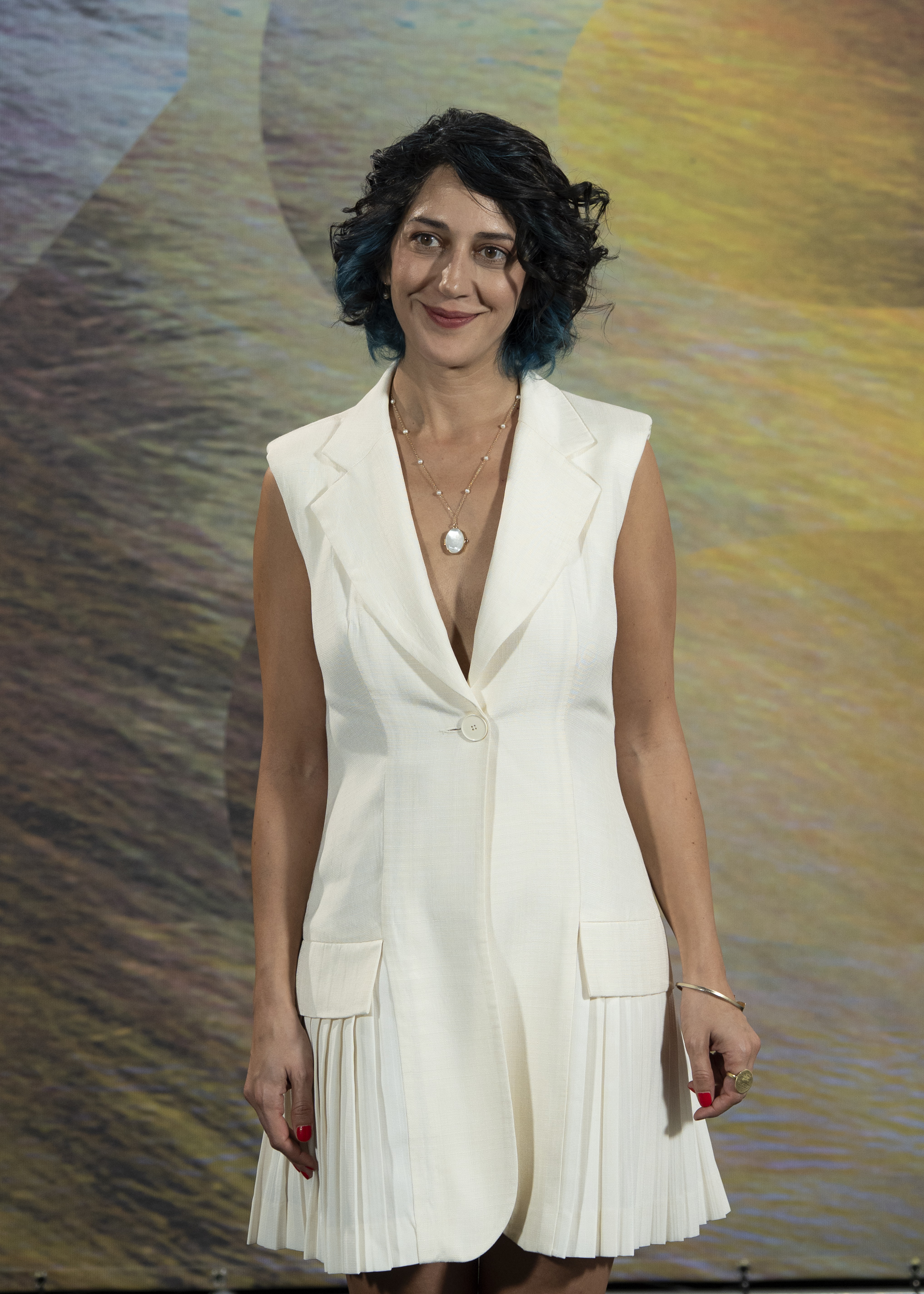

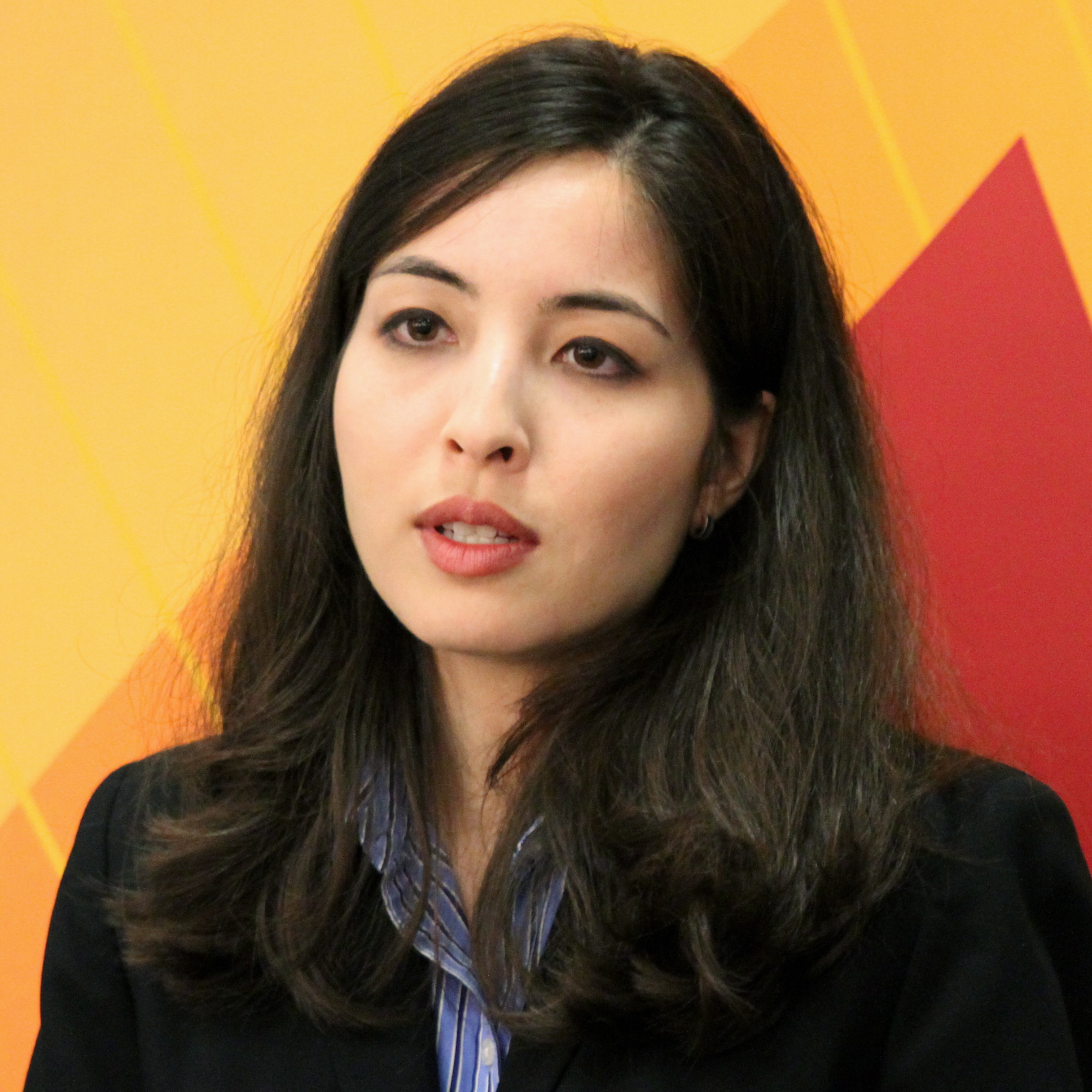

== Actresses ==
- Mahnaz Afshar (born 1978), Iranian-born German actress
- Shohreh Aghdashloo (born 1952), Iranian-American actress, Oscar nominee 2003 for House of Sand and Fog
- Pegah Ahangarani (born 1984), actress and winner of Best Actress award at the 23rd Cairo International Film Festival; moved to the United Kingdom
- Desiree Akhavan (born 1984), American actress, in the television show Girls, and director, winner, Sundance Film Festival Grand Jury Prize, 2018
- Taraneh Alidoosti (born 1984), Best Actress award winner, Locarno International Film Festival, 2002
- Mary Apick (born 1954), actress, Best Actress award winner (1977) at the 10th Moscow International Film Festival; moved to the United States
- Behnoosh Bakhtiari (born 1975), actress
- Catherine Bell (born 1968), British-American actress, JAG, half Iranian
- Nadia Bjorlin (born 1980), American of Swedish-Iranian ethnicity, actress, singer, and model
- Shiva Boloorian (born 1979), playwright, actress, television presenter, and both a film and theatre director
- Nazanin Boniadi (born 1980), Iranian-born British, London-based actress
- Liraz Charhi (born 1978), Iranian-Israeli actress, singer, and dancer
- Zahra Amir Ebrahimi (born 1981), Iranian-French actress and social photographer
- Irán Eory (1937–2002), actress; moved to Mexico
- Golshifteh Farahani (born 1983), Iranian-French actress
- Tina Gharavi (born 1972), Iranian-born British screenwriter and director
- Googoosh (born 1950), actress, singer, songwriter; moved to Canada
- Gordafarid (born 1977), Naqqal (storyteller) considered to be the first female Naqqal of Iran
- Azita Hajian (born 1958), actress, Crystal Simorgh winner for Best Actress, 17th Fajr International Film Festival
- Mitra Hajjar (born 1977), actress
- Leila Hatami (born 1972), actress, was in the Academy Award-winning film A Separation
- Rita Jahanforuz, known as "Rita" (born 1962), Iranian-born Israeli actress and singer
- Niki Karimi (born 1971), actress, film director, and screenwriter
- Maryam Kavyani (born 1970), actress
- Baran Kosari (born 1985), actress, and model; 25th Fajr International Film Festival awards winner
- Samiyeh Lak (born 1980), actress
- Aylar Lie (born 1984), Iranian-born Norwegian actress, model, singer, former pornographic actress
- Mahvash (1920–1961; also known as Masoumeh Azizi Borujerdi), singer, dancer, film actress and stage performer
- Yassamin Maleknasr (born 1955), actress and director
- Hengameh Mofid (born 1955), film and theatre actress, film director, dramatist
- Fatemeh Motamed-Arya (born 1961), actress
- Marjan Neshat (born 1975), actress nominated for 2025 Tony Award for Best Featured Actress in a Play for English; moved to the United States
- Nasim Pedrad (born 1981), Iranian-born American actress and comedian
- Shiva Rose (born 1969), Iranian-American actress and blogger
- Nahid Persson Sarvestani (born 1960), Swedish-Iranian documentary filmmaker
- Sarah Shahi (born 1980), American actress and former cheerleader, of Iranian-Spanish ancestry
- Yara Shahidi (born 2000), American actress, of Iranian, African American and Native Choctaw heritage
- Sarah Solemani (born 1982), English actress, writer, and activist
- Bahar Soomekh (born 1975), Iranian-born American actress, Crash and Saw III
- Tami Stronach (born 1972), actress, dancer, filmmaker, and professor; moved to the United States
- Hāni'eh Tavassoli (born 1979), actress
- Hedyeh Tehrani (born 1972), actress
- Necar Zadegan (born 1982), American actress
- Maryam Zakaria (born c. 1984/85), Swedish-Iranian actress in Bollywood and South Indian Cinema
- Nina Zanjani (born 1981), Iranian-Swedish actress
- Merila Zarei (born 1974), actress
- Irene Zazians (1927–2012), Iranian-Armenian actress
Iranian actresses

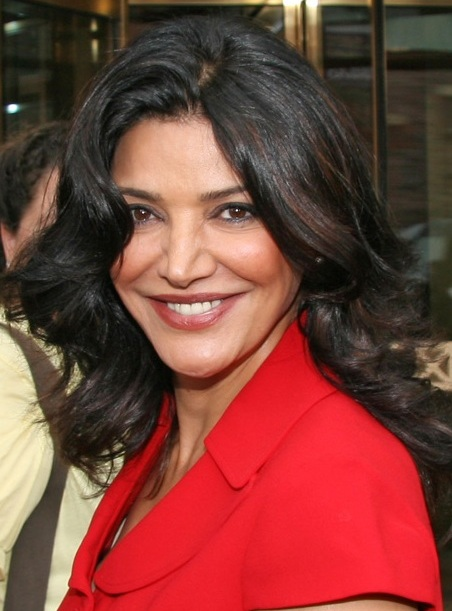
Shohreh Aghdashloo

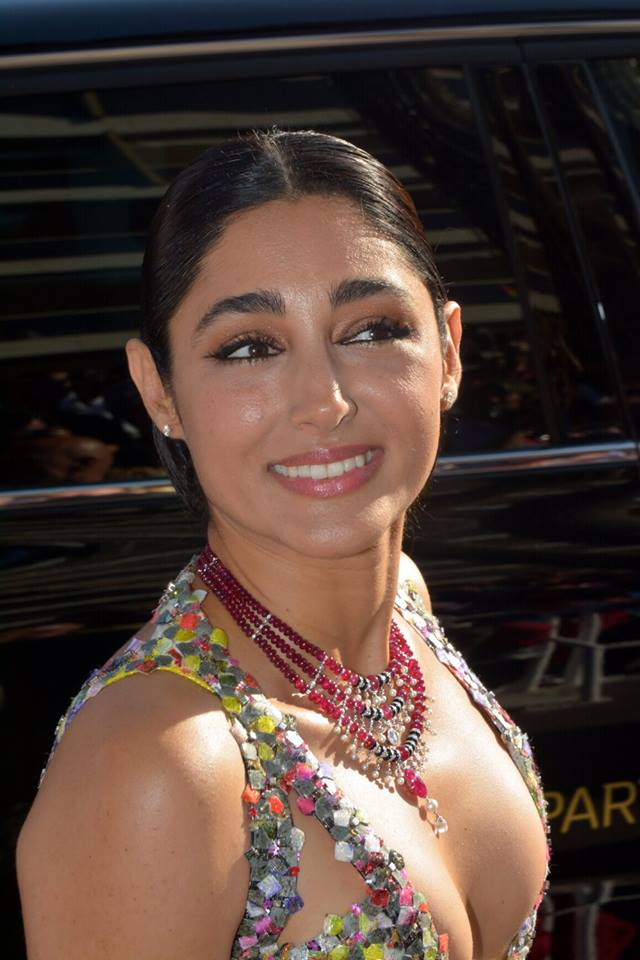
Golshifteh Farahani

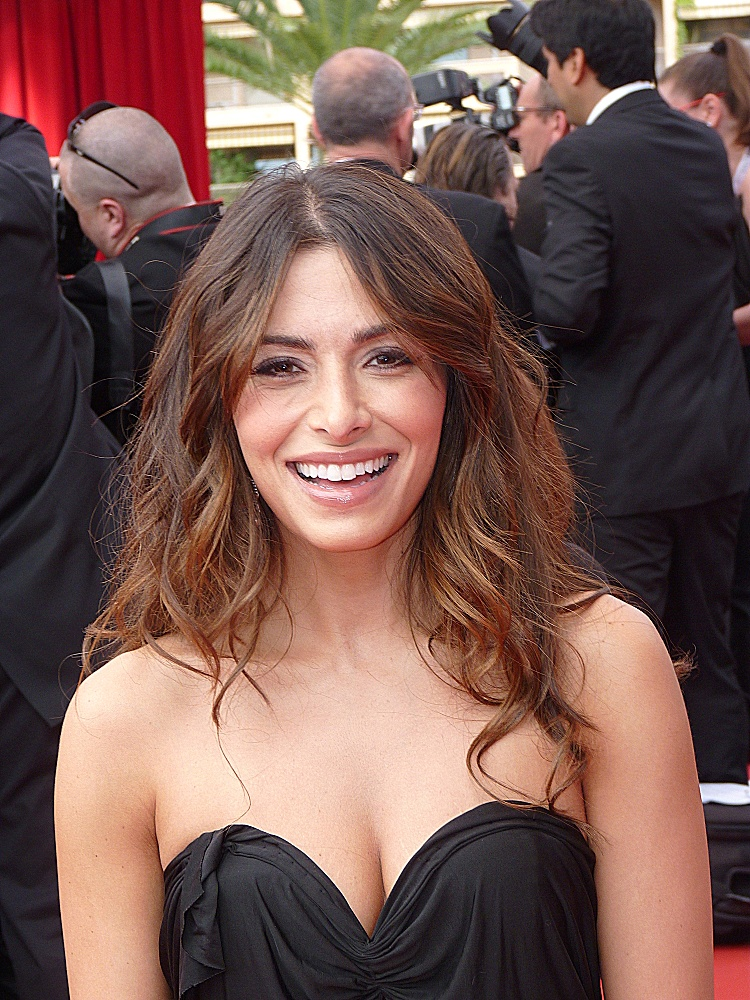
Sarah Shahi

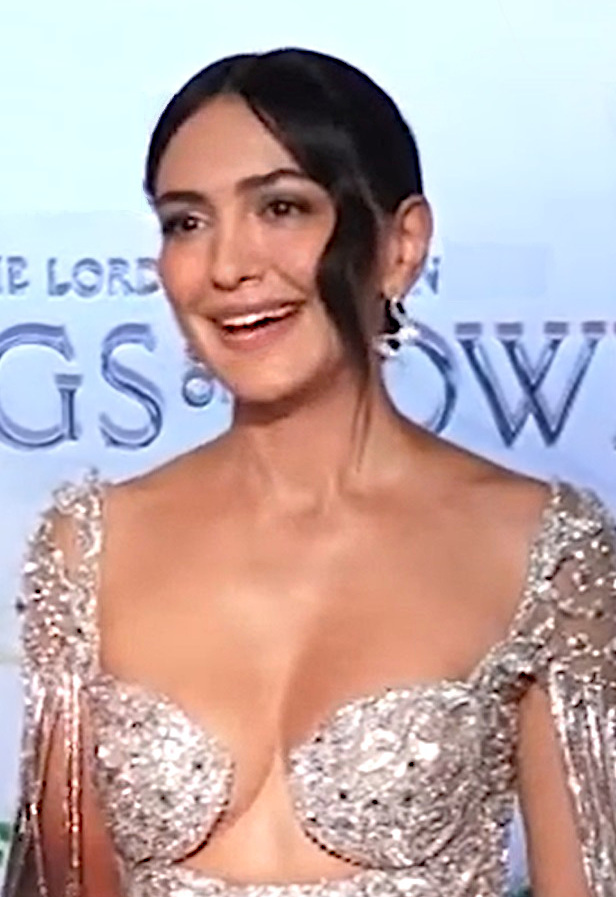
Nazanin Boniadi

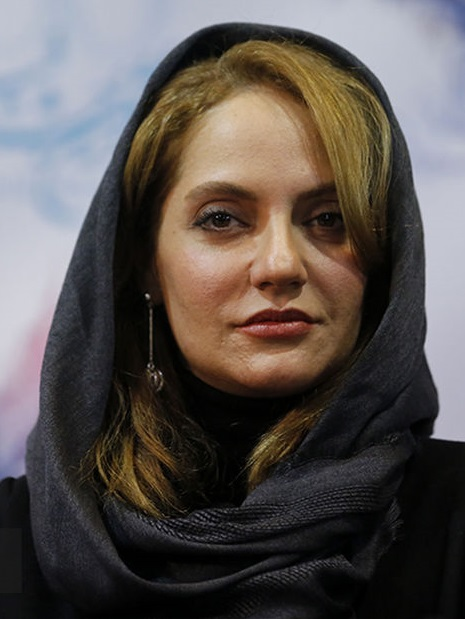
Mahnaz Afshar

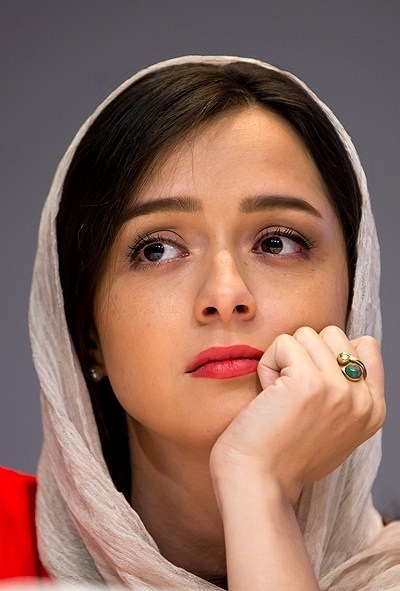
Taraneh Alidoosti

== Filmmakers and theatre directors ==
- Narges Abyar (born 1970), film director, author and screenwriter
- Rakhshan Bani-Etemad (born 1954), film director
- Niloofar Beyzaie (born 1967), playwright, theatre director; moved to Germany
- Pouran Derakhshandeh (born 1951), film director, producer, screenwriter, and researcher
- Tanaz Eshaghian (born 1974), Iranian-born American documentary filmmaker
- Aryana Farshad (born c. 1957), Iranian-American writer, director, and documentary film maker; winner of Audience Award, Telly Award, and Davey Award, 2008
- Niki Karimi (born 1971), actress, film director, and screenwriter
- Maryam Keshavarz (born 1975), Iranian-American film director
- Hana Makhmalbaf (born 1988), filmmaker, director
- Samira Makhmalbaf (born 1980), filmmaker, film director, and script writer
- Yassamin Maleknasr (born 1955), Iranian-American actress and director
- Tahmineh Milani (born 1960), feminist, film director, and film producer
- Hengameh Mofid (born 1955), film and theatre actress, film director, dramatist
- Granaz Moussavi, Iranian-born Australian film director, screenwriter
- Mahin Oskouei (1929–2006), first female Iranian theatre director
Iranian women filmmakers and theatre directors

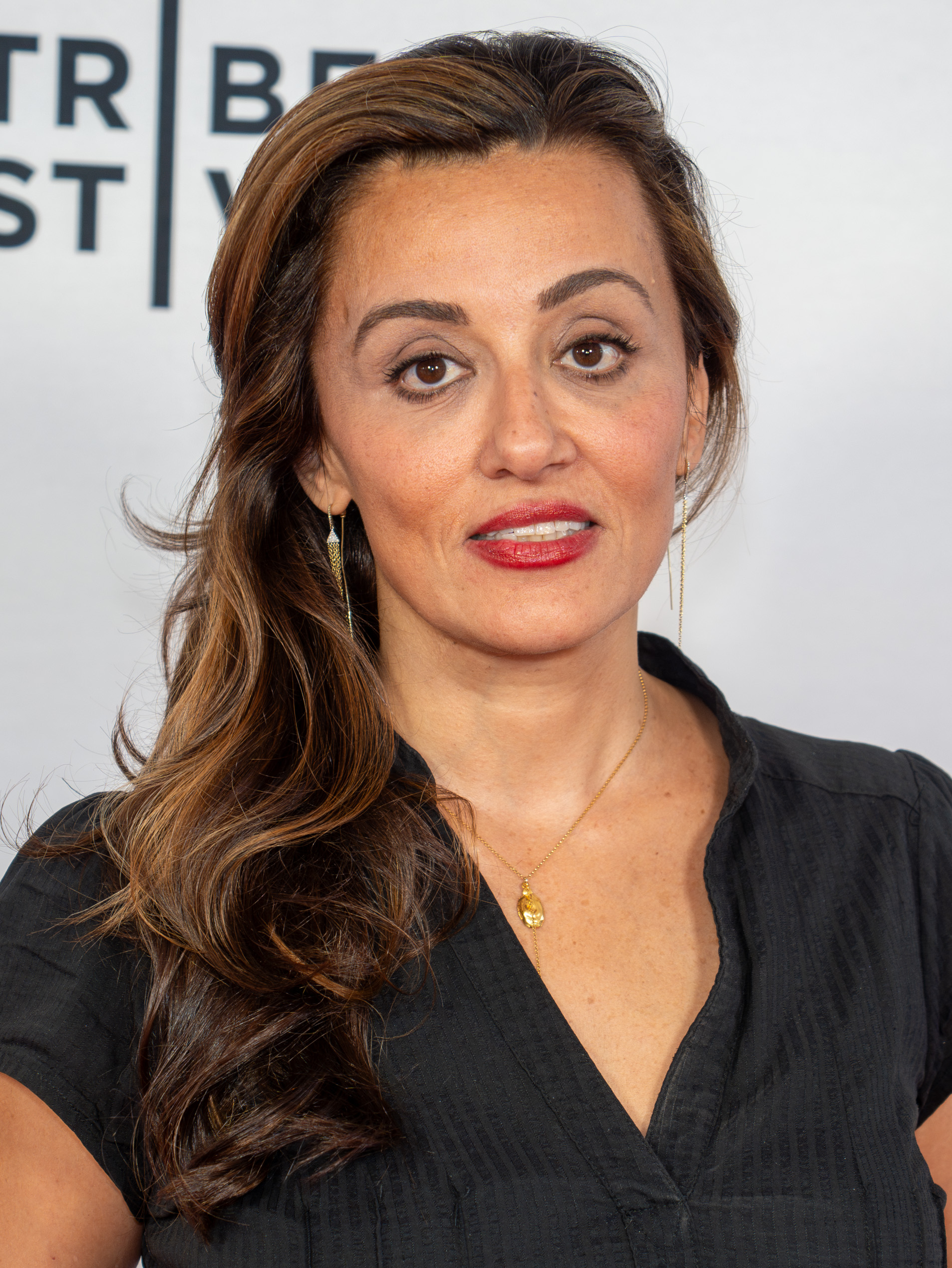

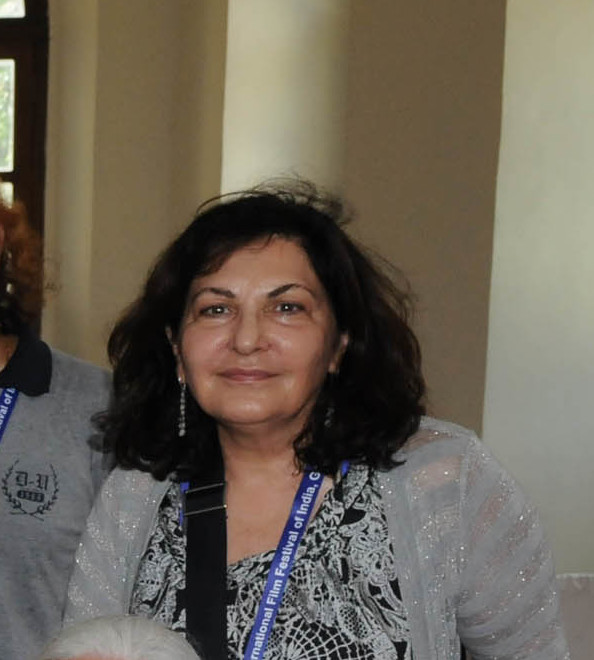

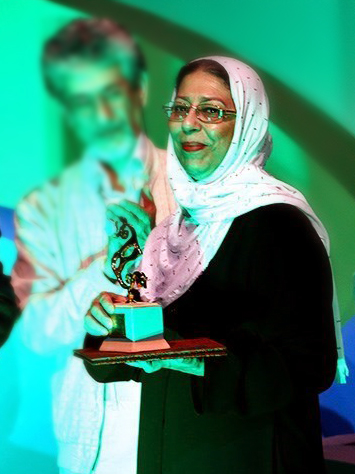

== Models and beauty pageant titleholders ==
- Nazanin Afshin-Jam (born 1979), Iranian-Canadian human rights activist, author and public speaker, and Miss World Canada 2003
- Ramona Amiri (born 1980), Iranian-Canadian Miss World Canada 2005, first runner up in Miss Universe Canada 2007
- Sara Nicole Andersen (born 1992), Norwegian-Iranian Miss Universe Norway 2012
- Sahar Biniaz (born 1985), Persian-Canadian Miss Universe Canada 2012
- Mahlagha Jaberi (born 1989), Iranian-American influencer and Instagram model
- Aylar Lie (born 1984), Iranian-born Norwegian actress, model, singer, former pornographic actress
- Leyla Milani (born 1982), Iranian-Canadian-American model, TV host and retired actress
- Melika Razavi (born 1989), Iranian-South African Miss Iran 2016, Miss Global Fitness 2016, and Miss Power Woman 2017; also a professional poker player and magician
- Roxana Saberi (born 1977), American Miss North Dakota 1997, journalist for CBS News, imprisoned in Evin Prison and sentenced to 8-year prison term under accusations of espionage, released after 101 days
- Shermine Shahrivar (born 1982), Iranian-German Miss Germany 2004 and Miss Europe 2005
- Sadaf Taherian (born 1988), model and actress; based in Turkey
- Samantha Tajik (born 1983), Iranian-Canadian Miss Universe Canada 2008
- Hami Zaker (born 1994), Miss Earth 2021, first Iranian delegate in the Big Four international beauty pageants
Iranian women models and beauty pageant titleholders

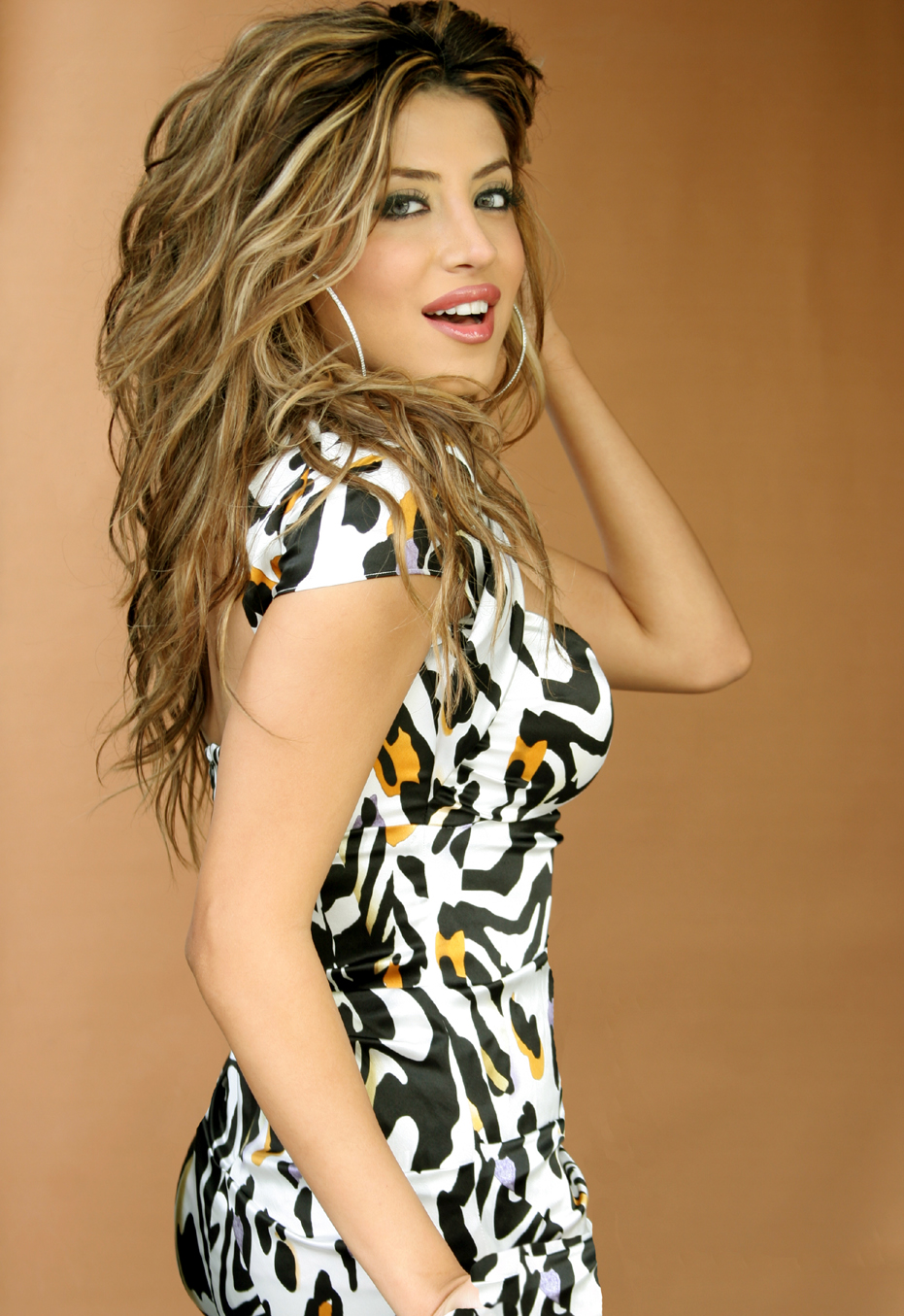

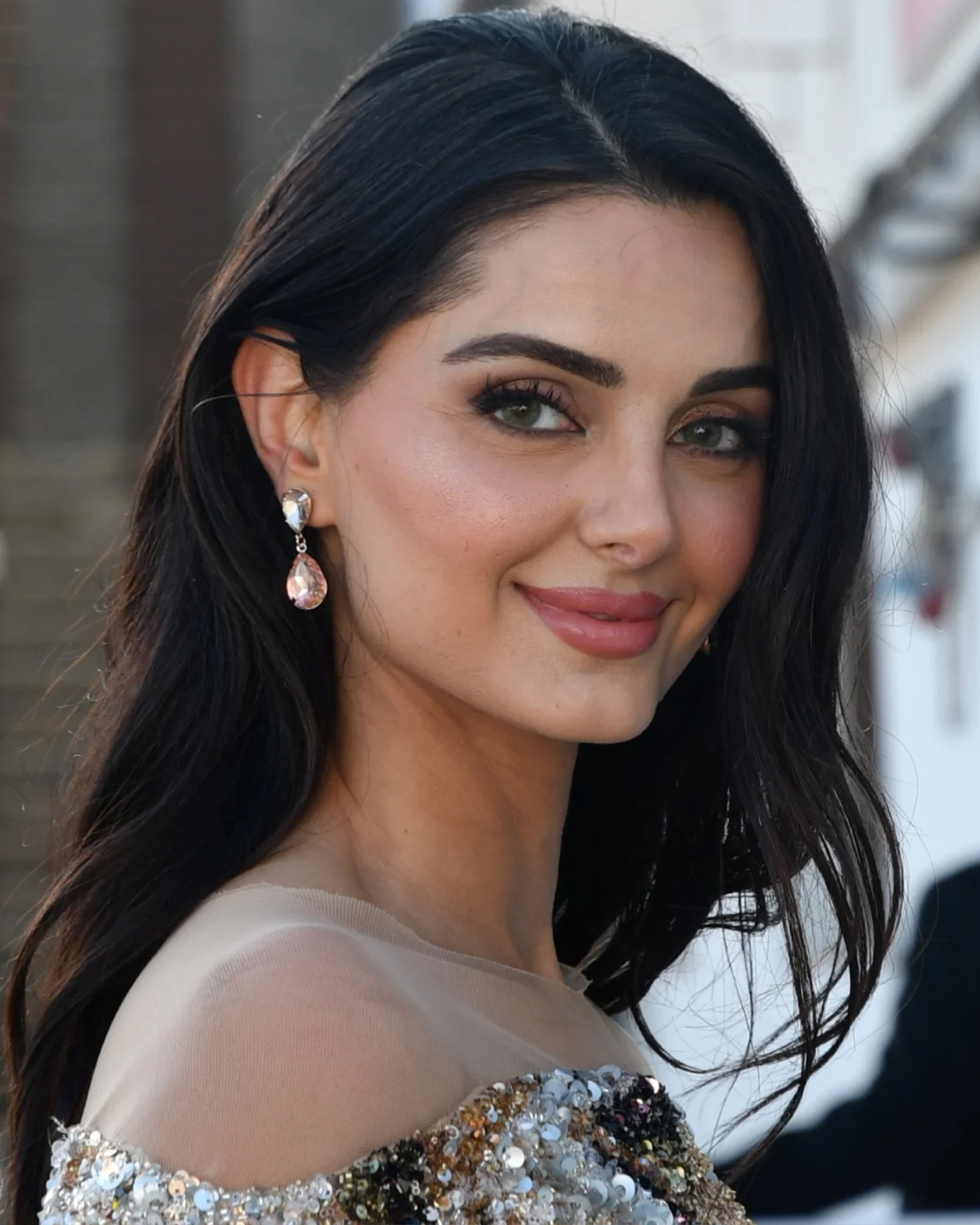

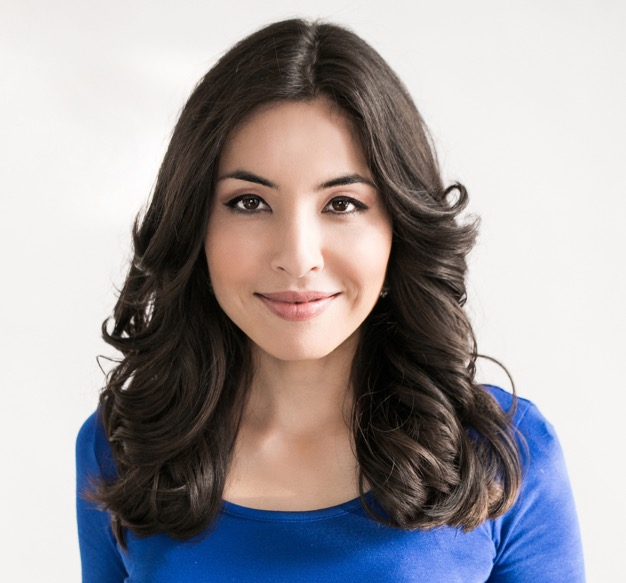

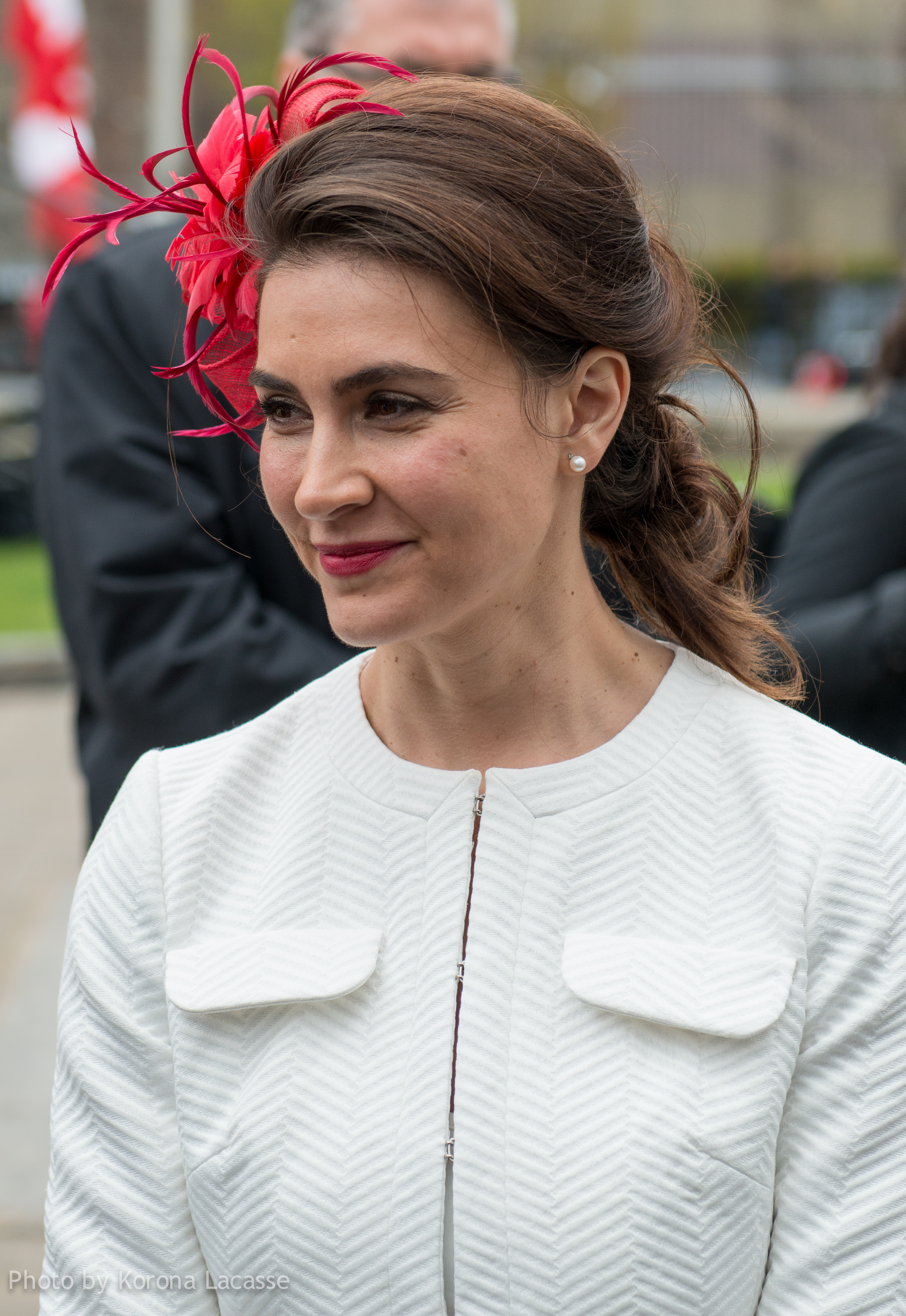

== Musicians ==
- Leila Arab (born 1971), musician, record producer and DJ; based in London
- Roya Arab (born 1967), Iranian-British musician, archaeologist, singer and songwriter
- Aki Banayi (1951–2025), Iranian-American singer
- Sima Bina (born 1945), traditional Iranian musician, singer, composer; lives in Germany
- Delkash (1925–2004; also known as Esmat Bagherpour Baboli), singer and actress
- Leila Forouhar (born 1959), pop and classical singer, based in Los Angeles
- Shushā Guppy (1935–2008), writer, editor, and singer of Persian and Western folk-songs; lived in London
- Hayedeh (1942–1990; also known as Ma'soumeh Dadehbala), pop and classical singer; lived in Los Angeles
- Ghashang Kamkar, musician, setar player; in the group the Kamkars
- Anousheh Khalili (born 1983), Iranian–American singer-songwriter
- Mahasti (1946–2007), Persian classical, folk, and pop music singer; lived in California
- Moshtari Khanum (c. 1786 – c. 1883), singer and setar player
- Marzieh (1924–2010), Persian traditional music singer; lived in Paris
- Mina (born 18th century; died 19th century), musician and singer, setar player
- Parisa (born 1950; also known as Fatemeh Va'ezi), Persian classical singer, Avaz master
- Laleh Pourkarim (born 1982), Iranian–Swedish singer-songwriter, musician, record producer, actress
- Rita (born 1962; Rita Jahanforuz), Iranian-born Israeli singer and actress, represented Israel in the Eurovision Song Contest
- Salome MC (born 1985), hip hop artist; now based in the United States
- Sepideh (born 1975), Iranian-American singer
- Shakila (born 1962), Iranian–American singer, winner of Persian Academy Award (2006); based in San Diego, California
- Shohreh Solati (born 1957), Iranian–American singer
- Monir Vakili (1923–1983), singer of western opera and Persian folk music, the first Persian singer to popularize Persian folk songs
- Qamar ol-Molouk Vaziri (1905–1953), radif-e âvâz singer, known as the "queen of Persian music"
- Farzane Zamen (born 1983), Iranian-British musician, singer, producer, songwriter
- Zohreh (born 18th century; died 19th century), musician; kamancheh, setar, and tar player
Iranian women musicians

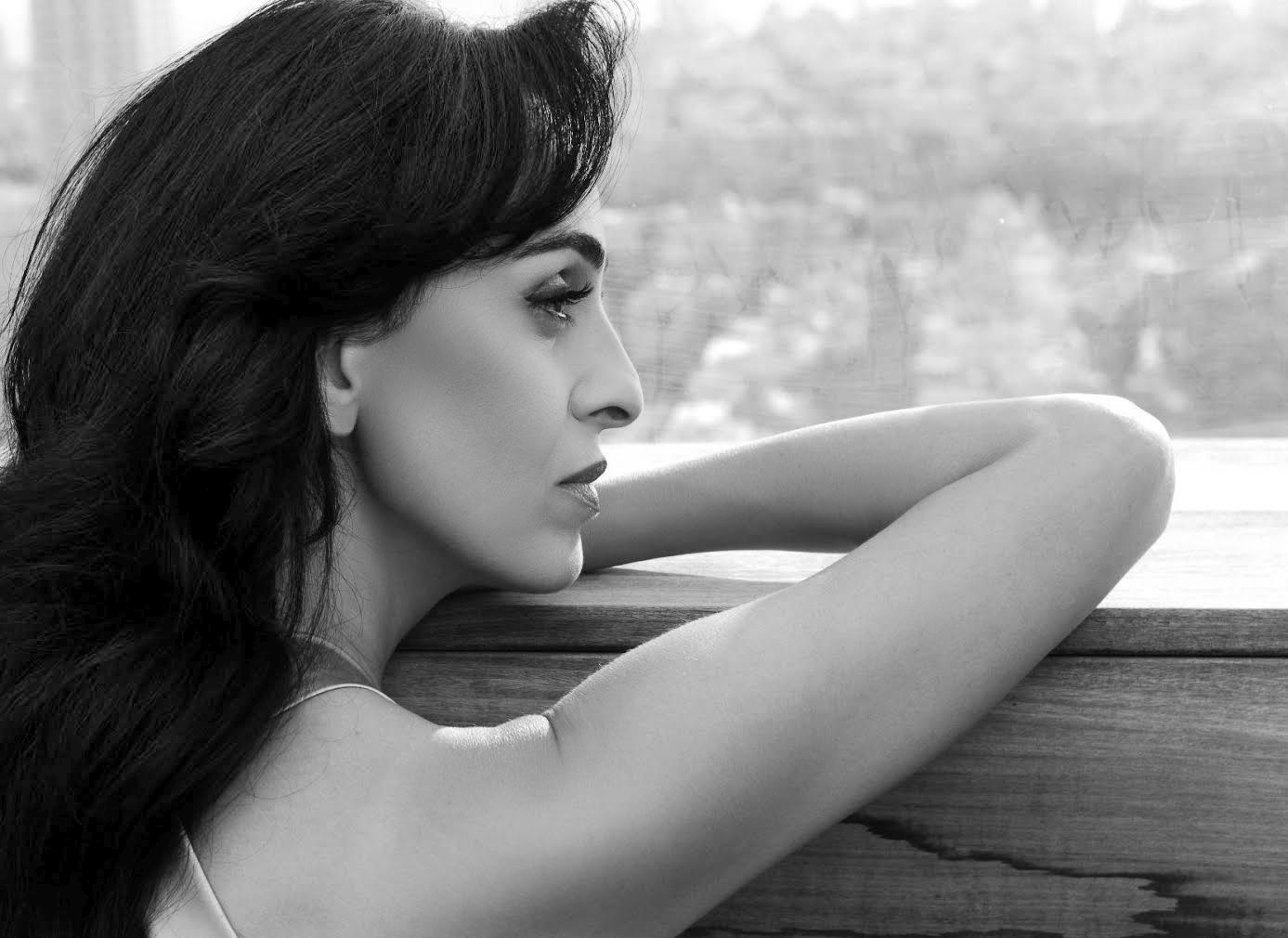

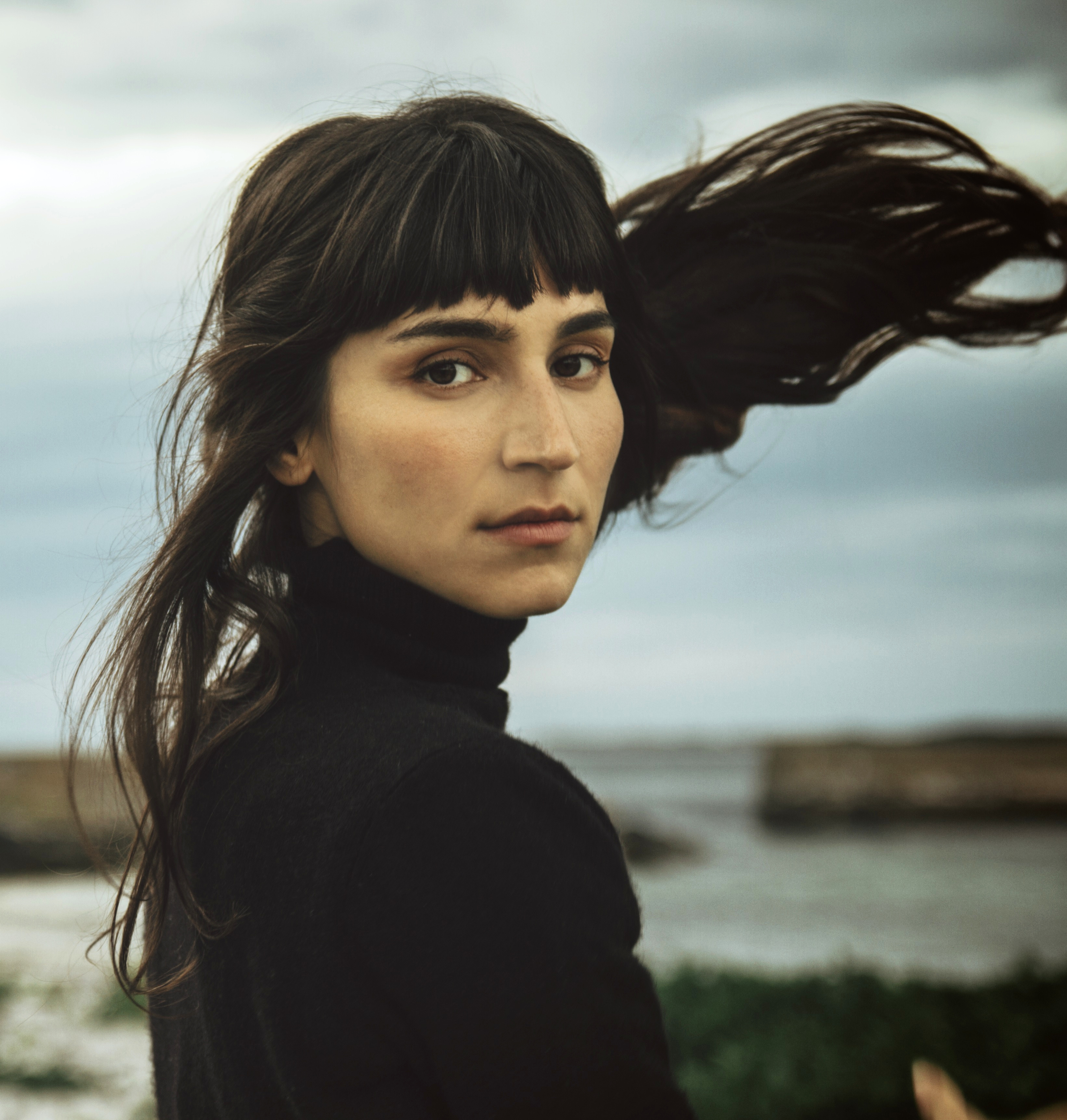

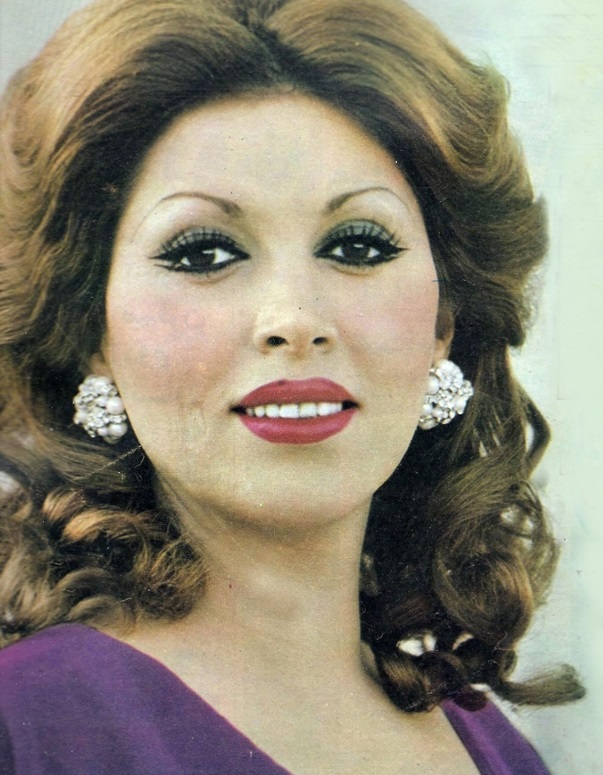

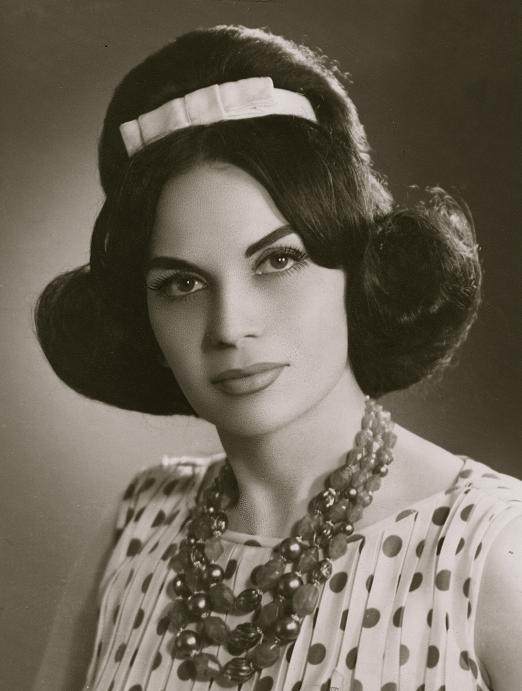

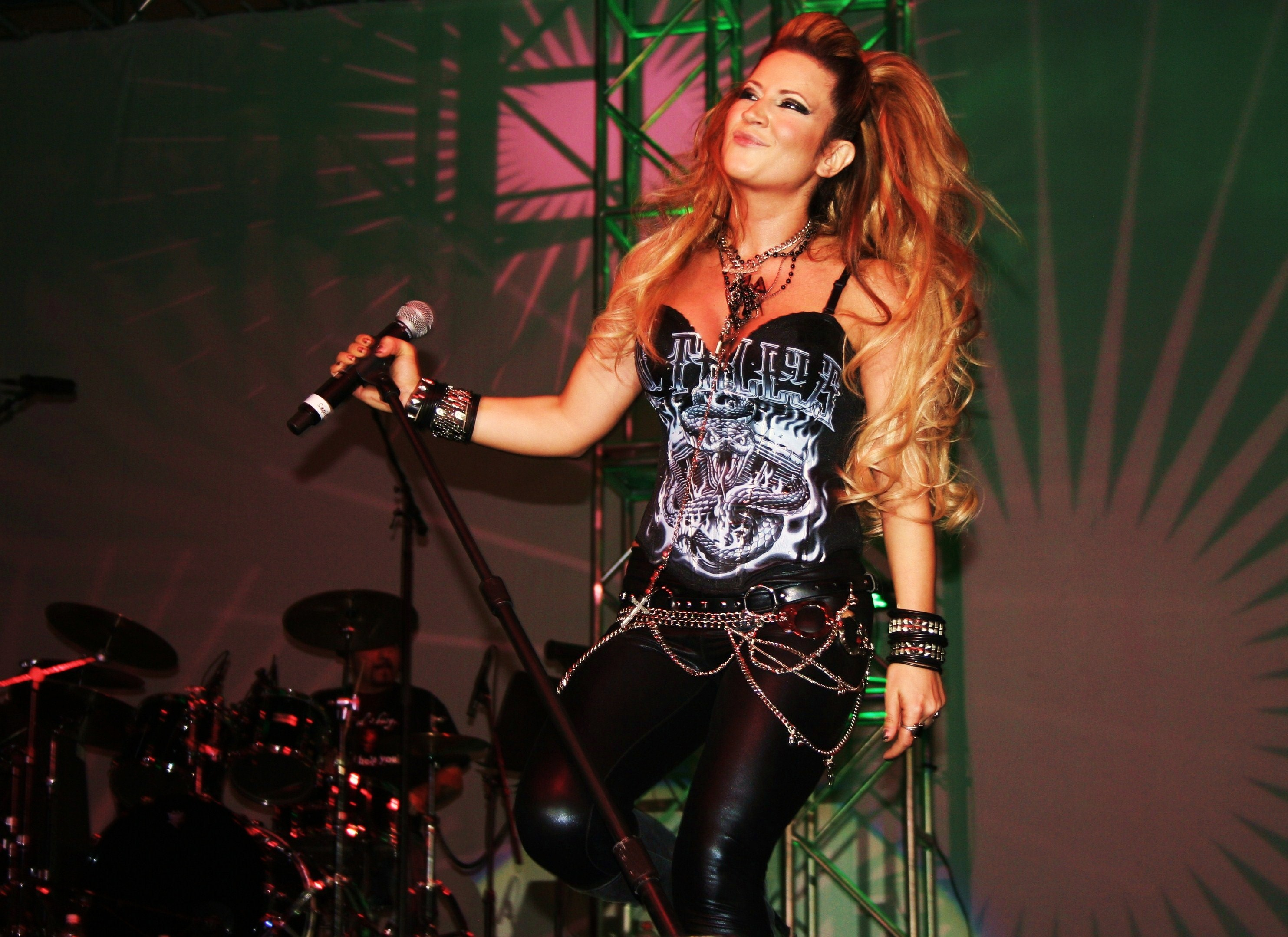

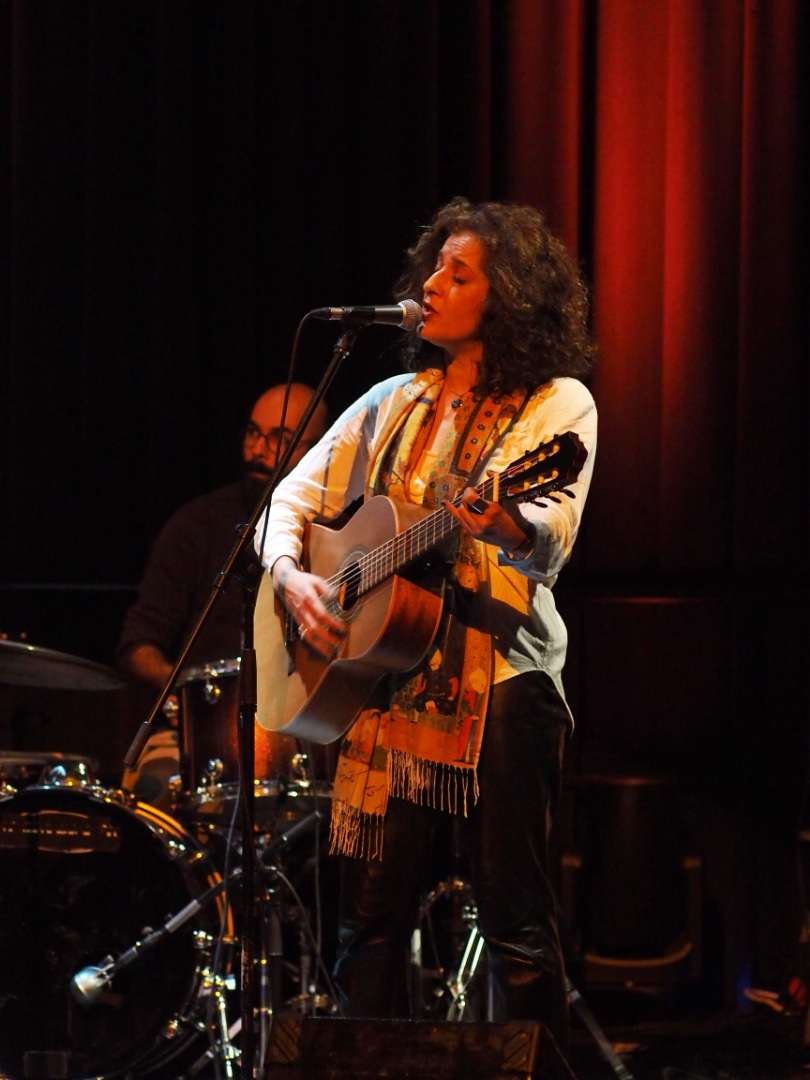

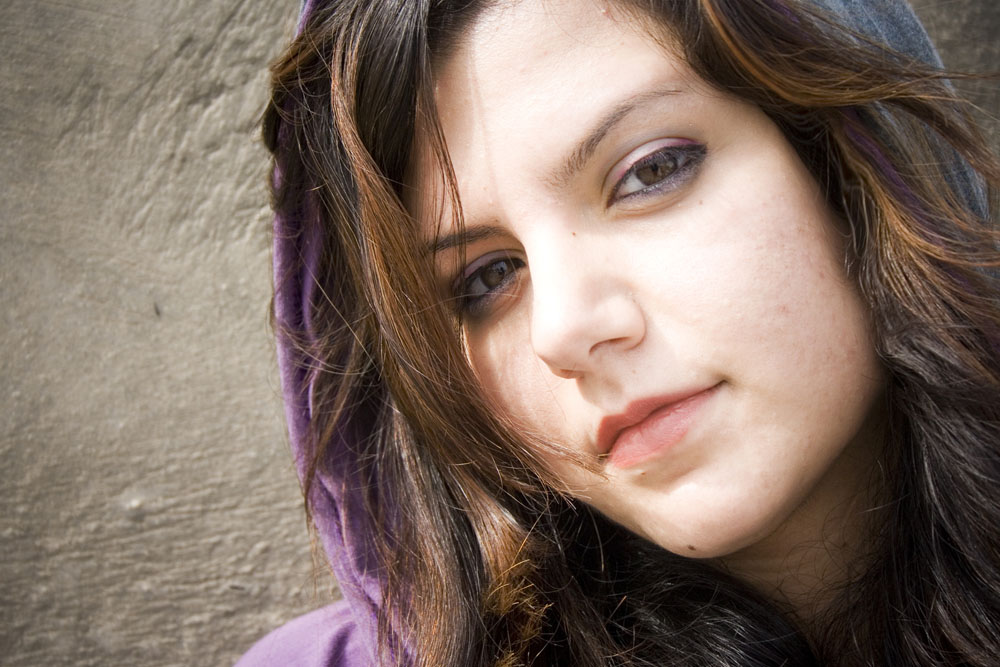

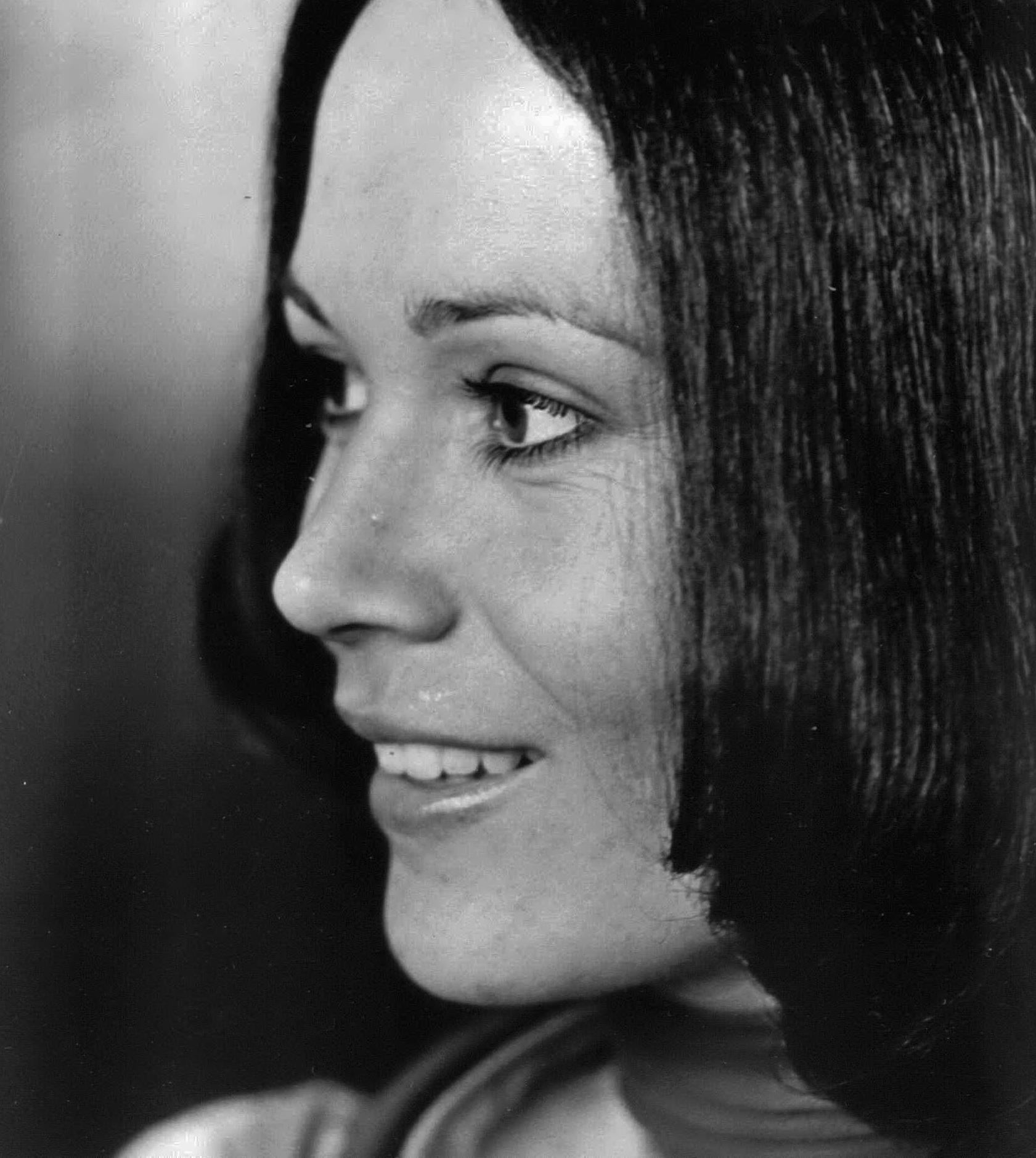

== Dance ==
- Sorour Darabi (born 1990), member of the ICCD, based in Paris because her form of dance is taboo in Iran
- Rana Gorgani (born 1983), French-Iranian Sufi whirling dervish dancer and former actress
- Jamileh (born 1946), Iranian-American actress, cabaret performer, and dancer
- Farzaneh Kaboli (born 1949), leader in Iranian folkloric and national dance art, actress
- Moshtari Khanum (c. 1786 – c. 1883), dancer of the Qajar era
Iranian women dancers

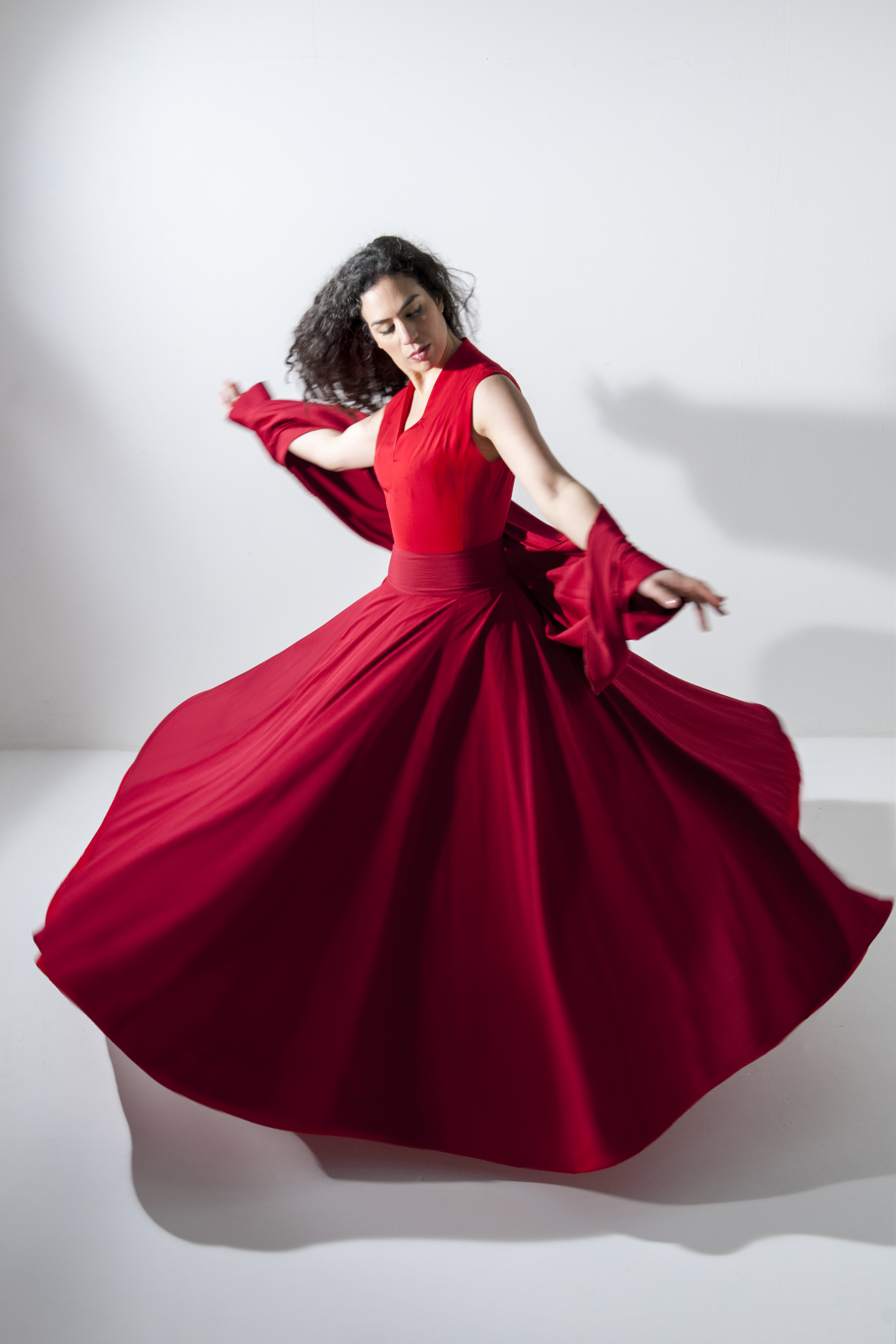

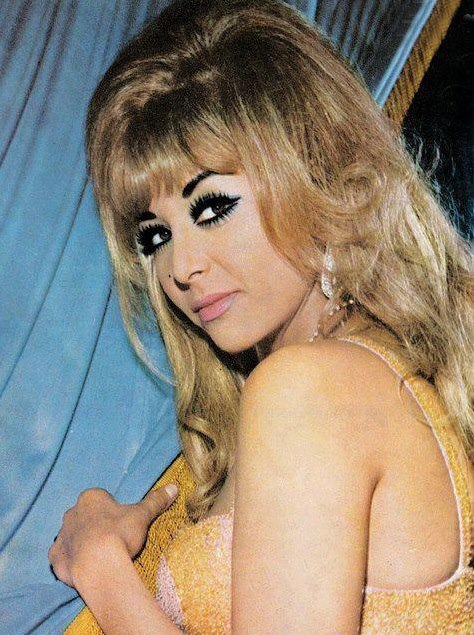

== Fine arts ==
- Shirin Aliabadi (1973–2018), multidisciplinary visual artist
- Morehshin Allahyari (born 1985), artist, educator, based in Brooklyn
- Akram Monfared Arya (born 1946), Swedish-Iranian painter late in life, but best known as the second licensed female aircraft pilot of Iran
- Iran Darroudi (1936–2021), Surrealist painter
- Monir Shahroudy Farmanfarmaian (1922–2019), best known for her mirror mosaics, sculptor, painter, textile designs
- Parastou Forouhar (born 1962), installation artist, lives in Germany
- Mokarrameh Ghanbari (1928–2005), self-taught painter
- Nahid Hagigat (born 1943), Iranian-born American painter and illustrator; based in New York City
- Mansooreh Hosseini (1926–2012), painter and art critic
- Fakhr Jahan Khanum (1798–1858), nail-style (Nakhoni) calligraphist
- Tala Madani (born 1981), Iranian-born American artist
- Shirin Neshat (born 1957), Iranian-American conceptual artist and photographer
- Guity Novin (born 1944), Iranian-born Canadian painter, graphic artist and founder of transpressionism movement in painting
- Behjat Sadr (1924–2009), Modernist painter; moved to France
Iranian women fine artists

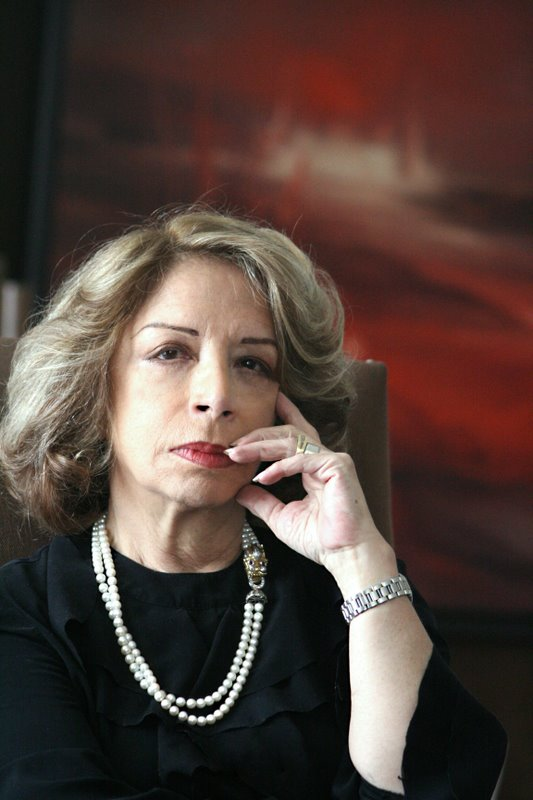

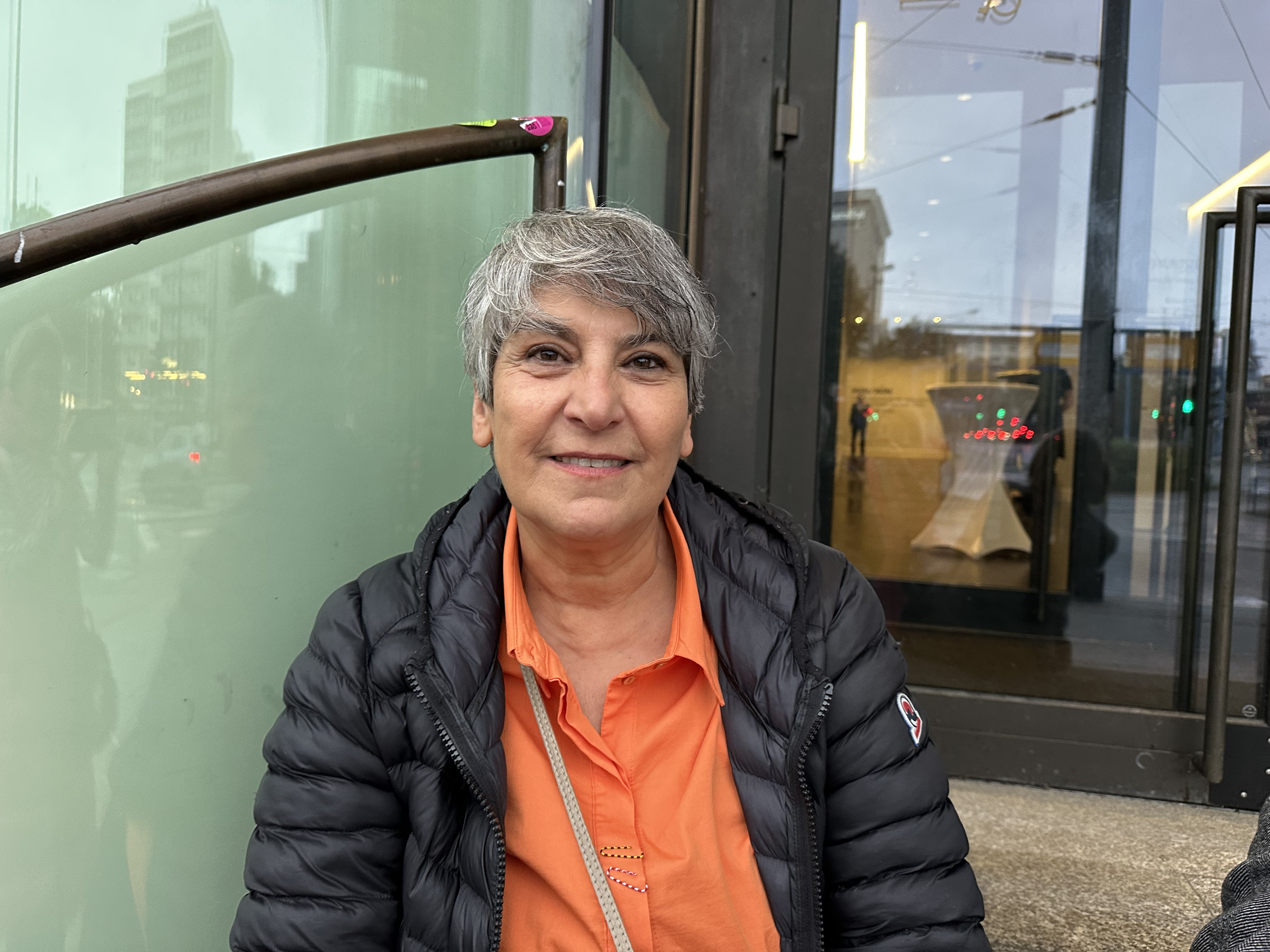

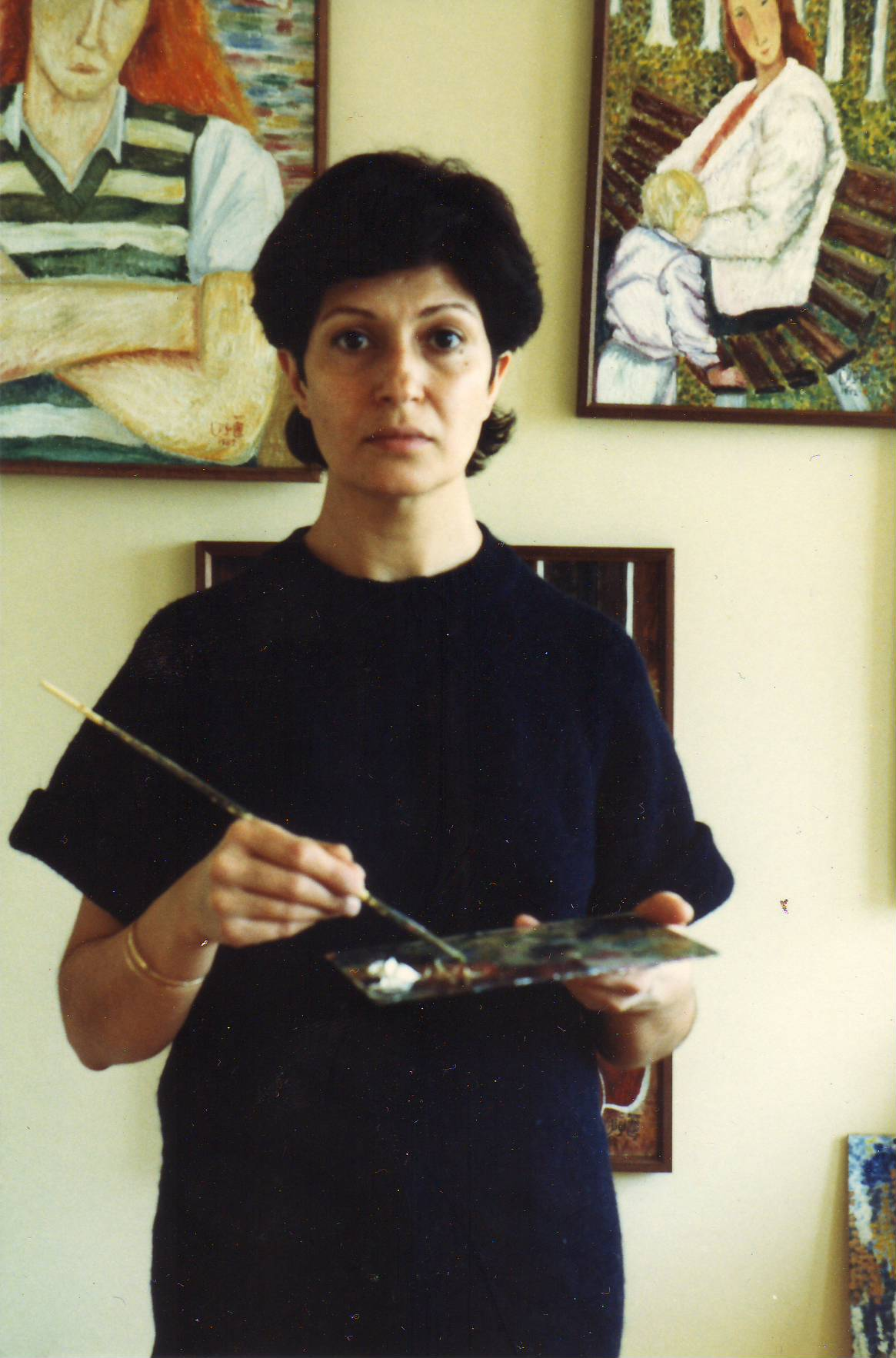

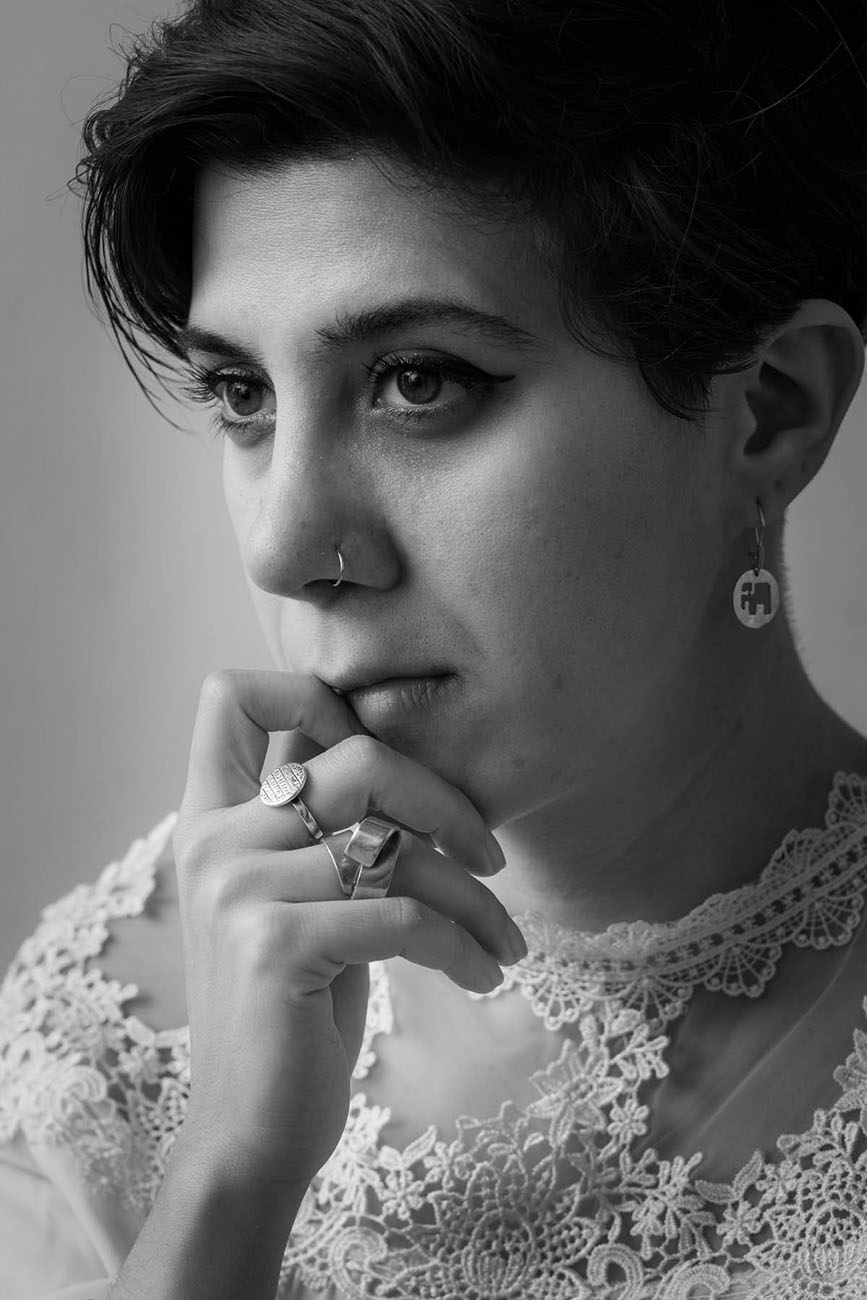

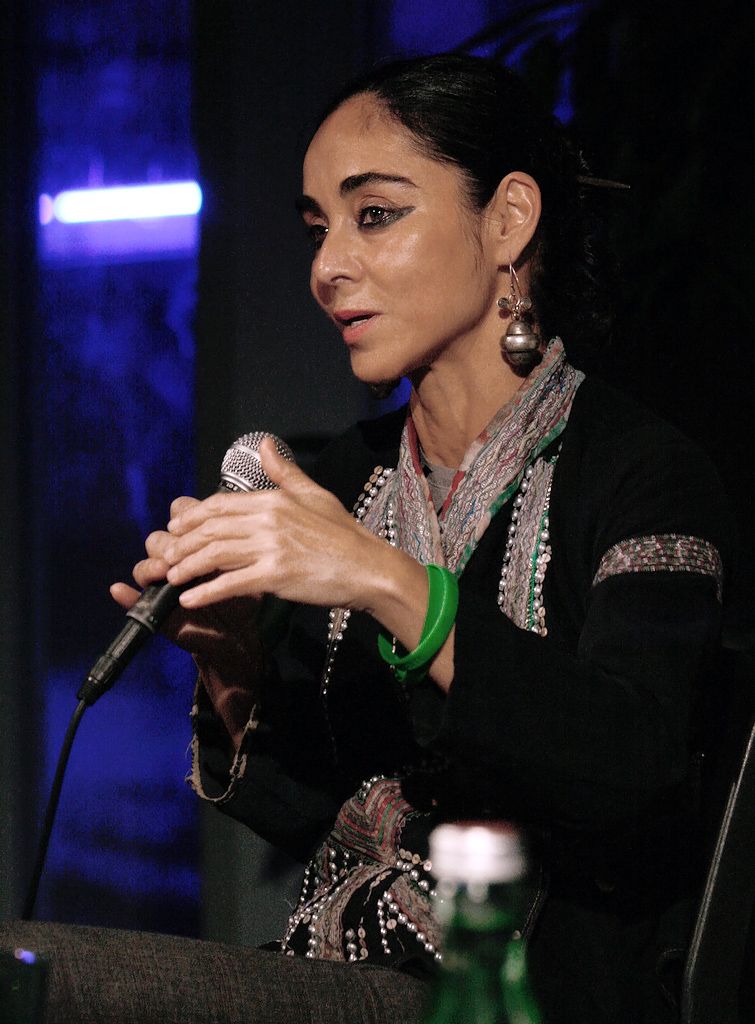

== Design ==
- Leila Araghian (born 1983), architect, founder of Diba Tensile Architecture, specializing in the design, manufacture, and installation of membrane structures
- Farshid Moussavi (born 1965), Iranian-born British architect, founder of Foreign Office Architects
- Marjane Satrapi (1969–2026), French-Iranian film director, illustrator, and graphic novelist
- Nasrine Seraji (born 1957), Iranian-born French-British architect, founder of Atelier Seraji Architectes & Associes
Iranian women designers

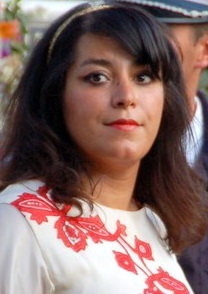

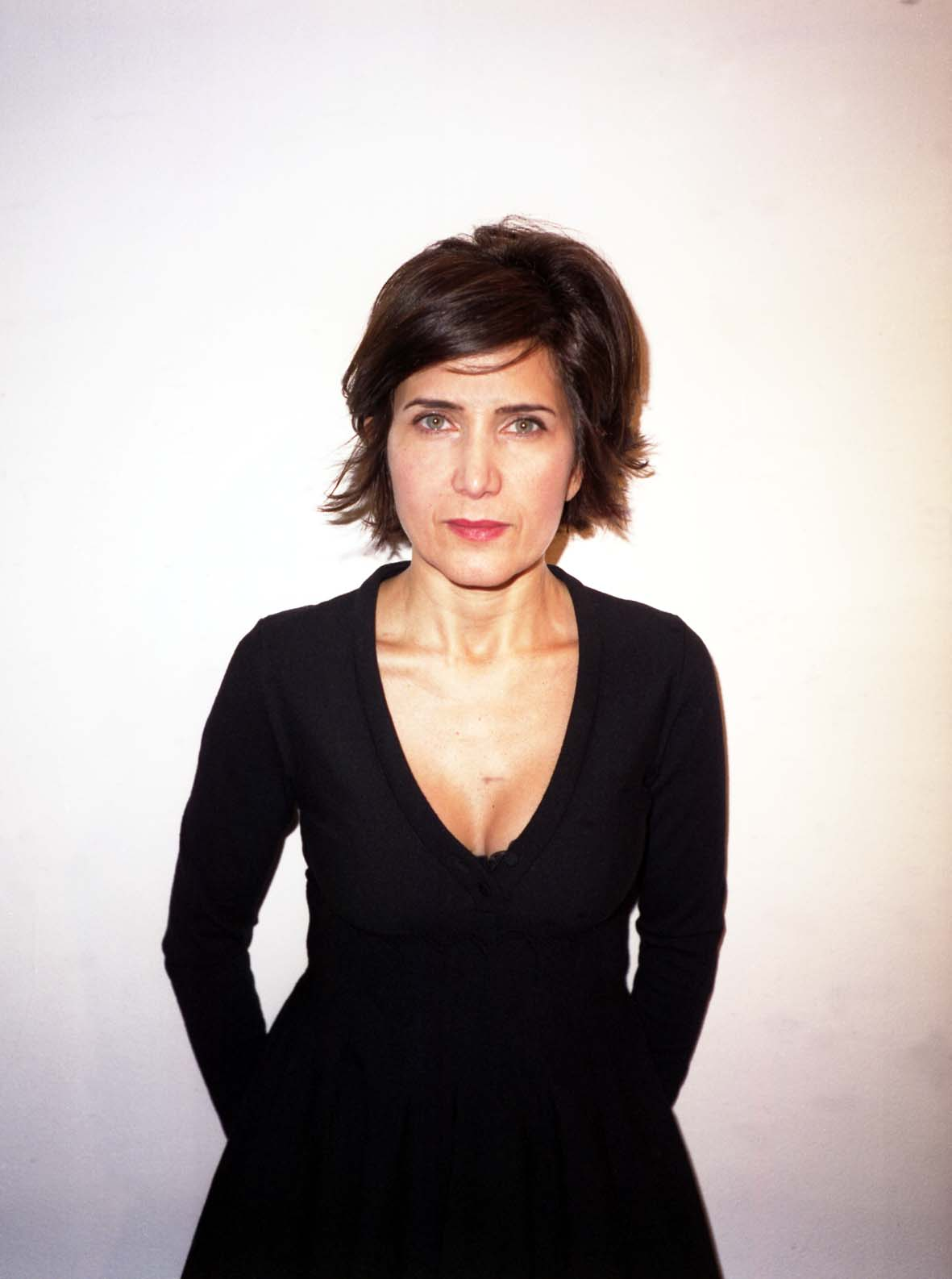

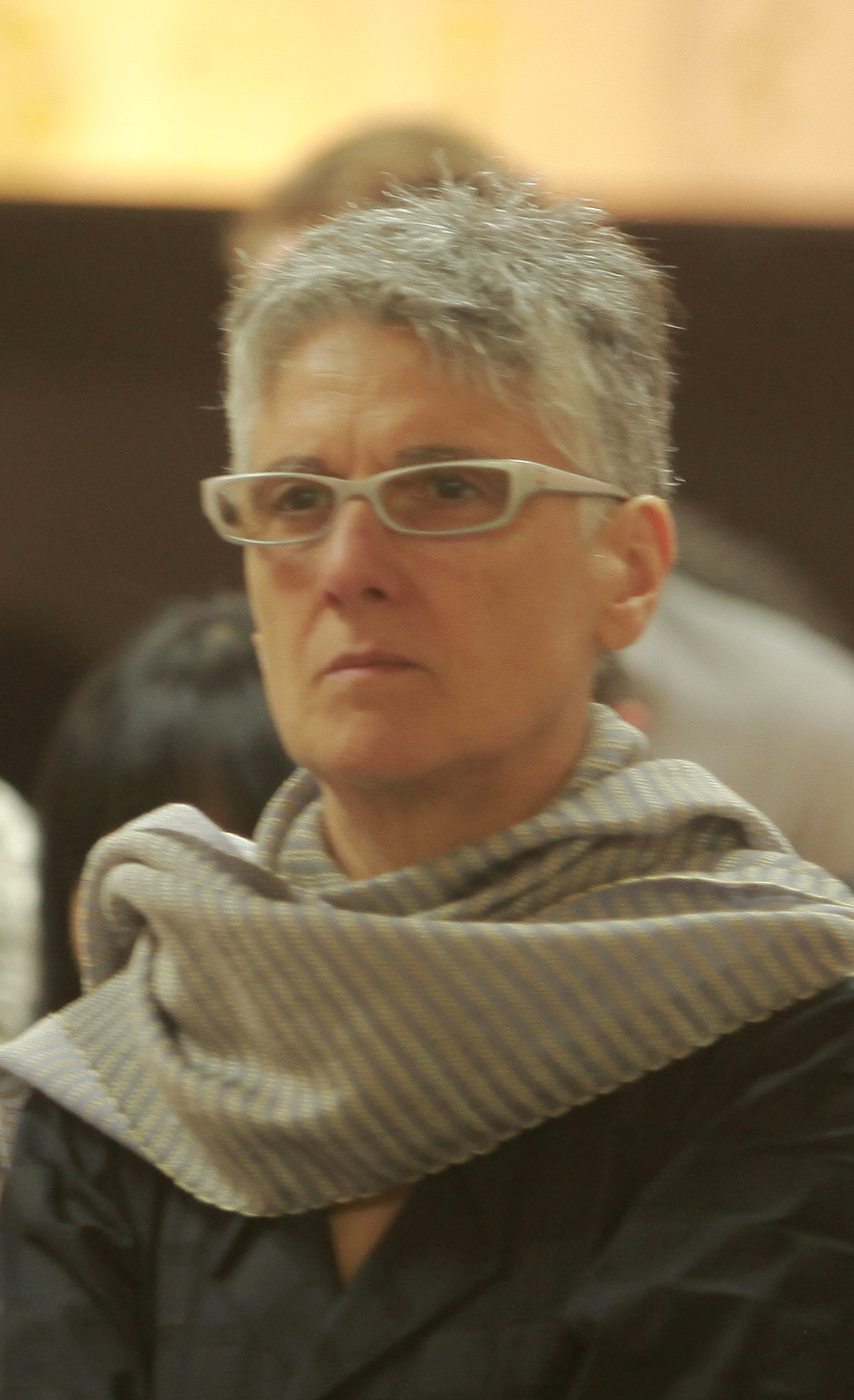

=== Fashion design ===
- Farnaz Abdoli (born 1957), womenswear fashion designer and founder of POOSH-e MA
- Pegah Anvarian (born 1974), Iranian-born American fashion designer, based in Los Angeles
- Arefeh Mansouri (born 1980), Iranian-Canadian fashion and costume designer
- Behnaz Sarafpour (born 1969), Iranian-born American couture fashion designer, based in New York City
Iranian women fashion designers

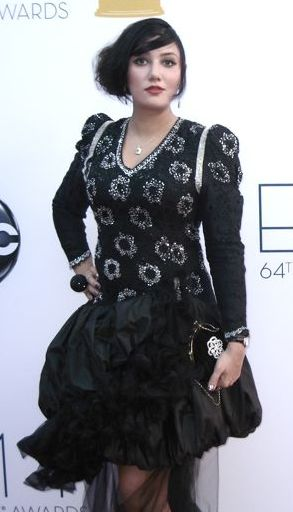

== Journalists ==
- Masih Alinejad (born 1976), Iranian-American journalist, author, and political activist critical of the status of human and women's rights in Iran
- Christiane Amanpour (born 1958), British–Iranian, CNN's chief international correspondent
- Rudi Bakhtiar (born 1966), Iranian-American television news anchor
- Sediqeh Dowlatabadi (1882–1961), feminist activist and journalist, a pioneering figure in the Persian women's movement
- Sibel Edmonds (born 1970), American of Iranian Azerbaijani and Turkish ethnicity, editor-in-chief of news website NewsBud; former contract translator for the FBI and whistleblower
- Camelia Entekhabifard (born 1973), Iranian-American journalist and author
- Faezeh Hashemi (born 1963), journalist, women rights activist, and former member of Iranian parliament
- FakhrAfagh Parsa (1898–1980), director of the Women's World magazine and the first female journalist in the Iranian history to be exiled
- Atoosa Rubenstein (born 1972), Iranian-American founder and editor of CosmoGirl magazine; editor of Seventeen
- Roxana Saberi (born 1977), American journalist for CBS News, imprisoned in Evin Prison and sentenced to 8-year prison term under accusations of espionage, released after 101 days
- Shadi Sadr (born 1974), feminist activist, lawyer and journalist, based in the United Kingdom
- Iran Teymourtash (1914–1991), journalist and early activist; daughter of Abdolhossein Teymourtash; moved to France
Iranian women journalists

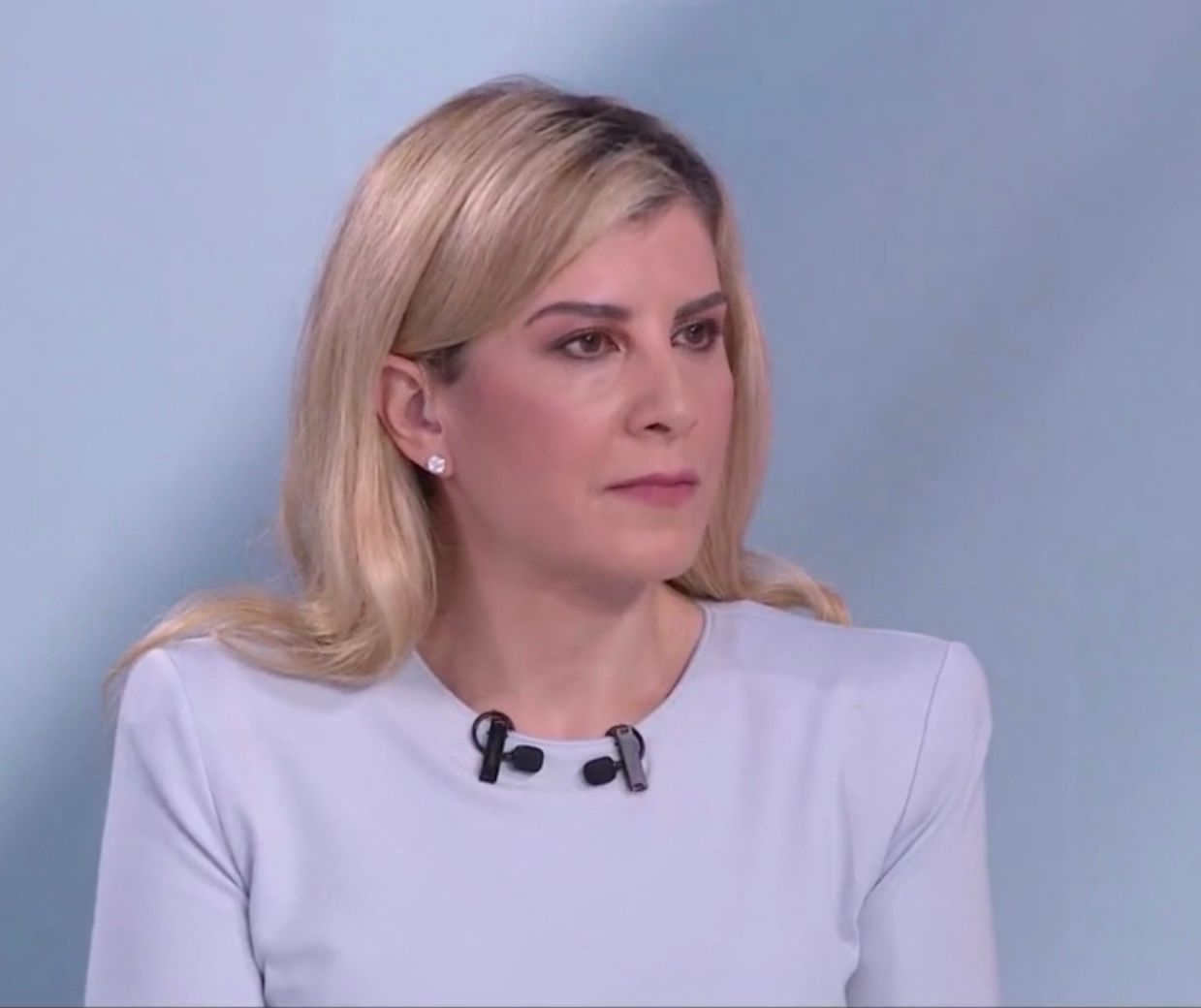

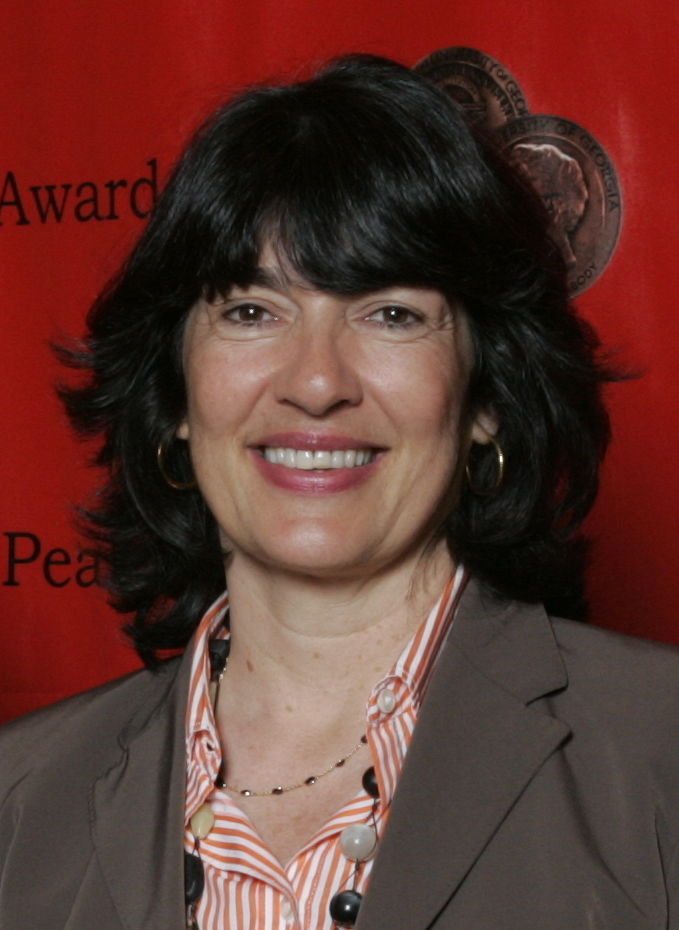

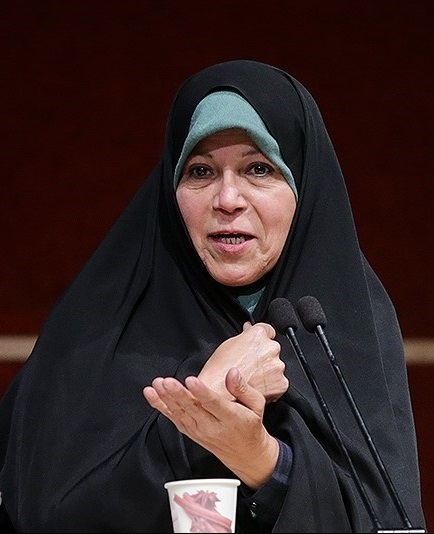

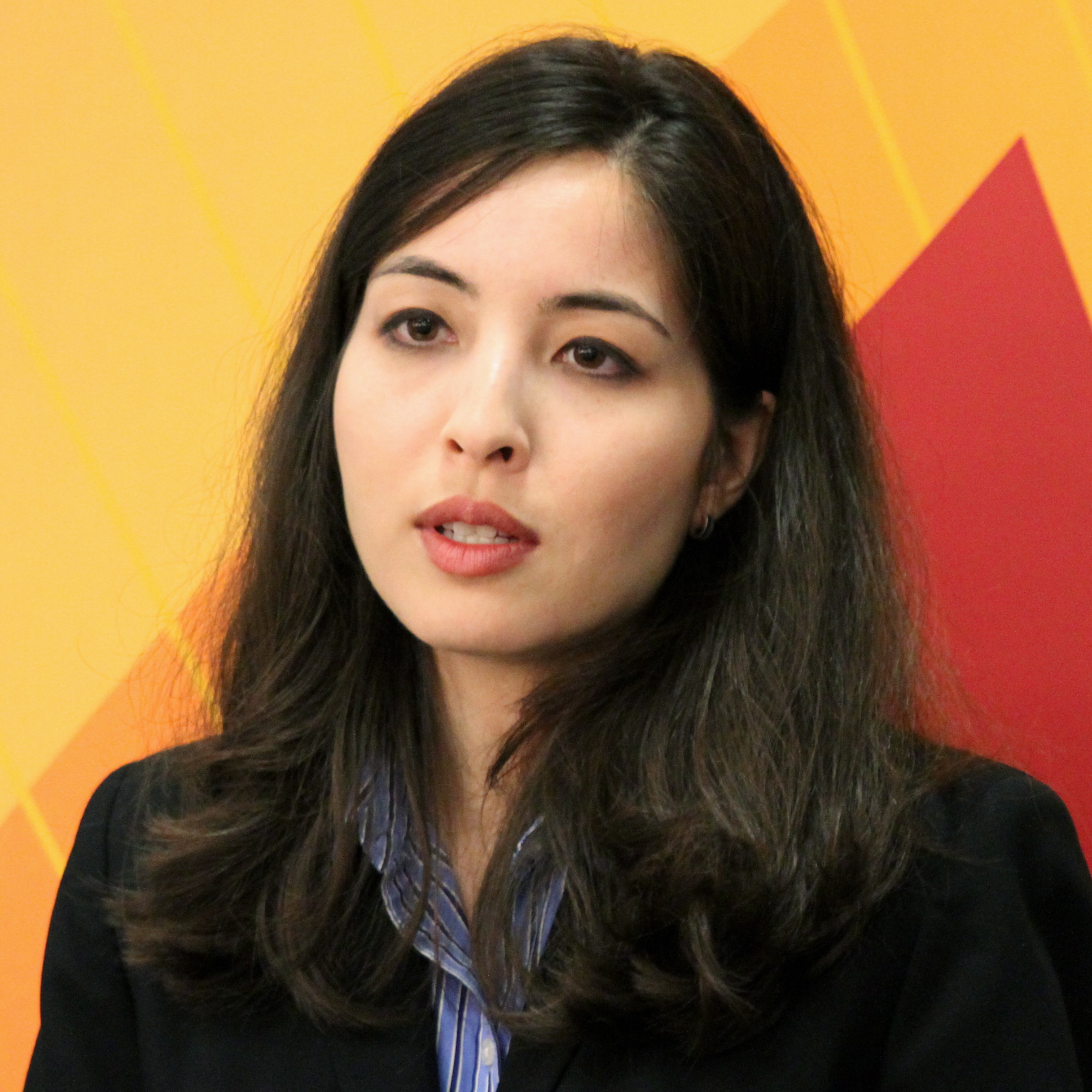

== Writers and poets ==
- Masoumeh Abad (born 1962), writer, conservative politician, author
- Mahnaz Afkhami (born 1941), writer, politician, women's rights activist; moved to the United States
- Mana Aghaee (born 1973), Iranian-Swedish poet, translator, and bibliographer
- Mahshid Amirshahi (born 1937), novelist, humorist, and translator; moved to France
- Mina Assadi (born 1943), Iranian-Swedish poet and author; winner of the Hellman/Hammett award from Human Rights Watch in 1996
- Camila Batmanghelidjh (1963–2024), Iranian-Belgian psychotherapist, author
- Najmieh Batmanglij (1947), Iranian-American cookbook author
- Simin Behbahani (1927–2014), poet, 1997 Nobel Prize nominee
- Niloofar Beyzaie (born 1967), dramatist, playwright and theatre director; moved to Germany
- Simin Daneshvar (1921–2012), academic, novelist and translator of literary texts from several languages into Persian
- Sahar Delijani (born 1983), Iranian-American widely translated novelist; author of Children of the Jacaranda Tree; living between the United States and Italy
- Parvin E'tesami (1907–1941), poet
- Forough Farrokhzad (1934–1967), modernist poet and film director
- Rabe'e Ghazdari, poet, 10th century
- Roya Hakakian (born 1966), Iranian-American writer, journalist, and poet
- Sheema Kalbasi (born 1972), Iranian-Danish-American poet, writer
- Mehrangiz Kar (born 1944), lawyer, author, Radcliffe Fellow at Harvard University (2005–06)
- Leila Kasra (1939–1989), poet and lyricist; moved to the United States
- Porochista Khakpour (born 1978), Iranian-American novelist
- Mahsati (c. 1089–1159), medieval poet
- Leandra Medine (born 1988), American author, blogger, and humor writer best known for Man Repeller
- Azadeh Moaveni (born 1976), Iranian-American writer and journalist
- Bita Moghaddam, Iranian-American author of Ketamine
- Akram Monfared Arya (born 1946), Iranian-born Swedish author, poet, aircraft pilot, and the second woman to earn a pilot's license to fly aircraft in Iran
- Roza Montazemi (1922–2009), author of cookbooks
- Granaz Moussavi (born 1974), Iranian-Australian poet
- Azar Nafisi (born 1948), Iranian-American writer, Reading Lolita in Tehran
- Shahrnush Parsipur (born 1946), novelist; moved to the United States
- Zoya Pirzad (born 1952), novelist and winner of Hooshang Golshiri Literary Award
- Moniro Ravanipour (born 1952), Iranian-American writer
- Gulrukhsor Safieva (born 1947), national poet of Tajikistan
- Homa Sarshar (born 1946), Iranian-American author, activist, media personality, and journalist
- Marjane Satrapi (born 1969), French-Iranian graphic novelist of Persepolis, Embroideries and Chicken with Plums
- Hila Sedighi (born 1985), poet, painter; moved in part to Dubai
- Mahasti Shahrokhi (born 1956), poet, novelist; moved to France
- Fatemeh Shams (born 1983), poet, author; moved to the United States
- Esther Shkalim (born1954), Israeli, Mizrahi feminist poet
- Dalia Sofer (born 1972), Iranian-born American writer
- Tahereh Qorrat Al-'Ayn (c.1814–1852), poet, philosopher and theologist; seventeenth disciple or Letter of the Living of the Báb (mid-19th century)
- Niloufar Talebi, British-born American-Iranian writer, literary translator, multidisciplinary artist, producer
- Badri Tarvij (1932–2017), poet
- Lobat Vala (born 1930), poet; moved to England
- Sholeh Wolpé (born 1962), Iranian-American poet
Iranian women writers and poets

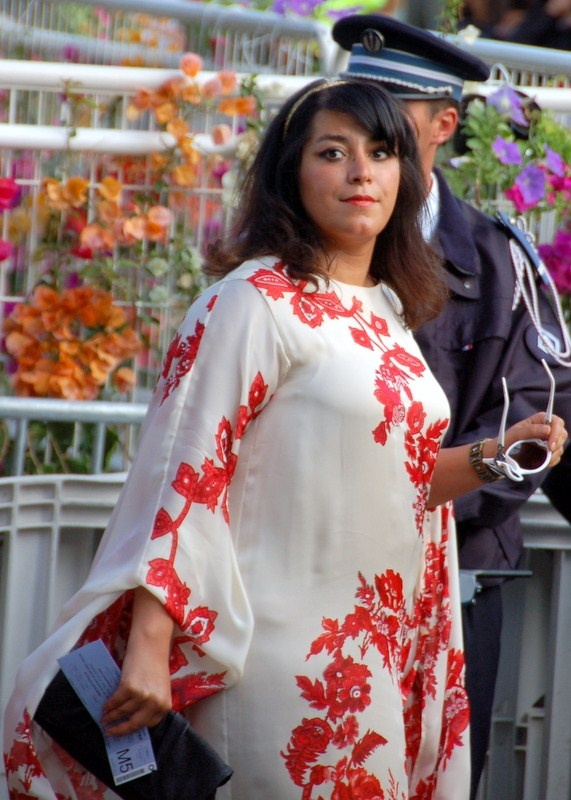

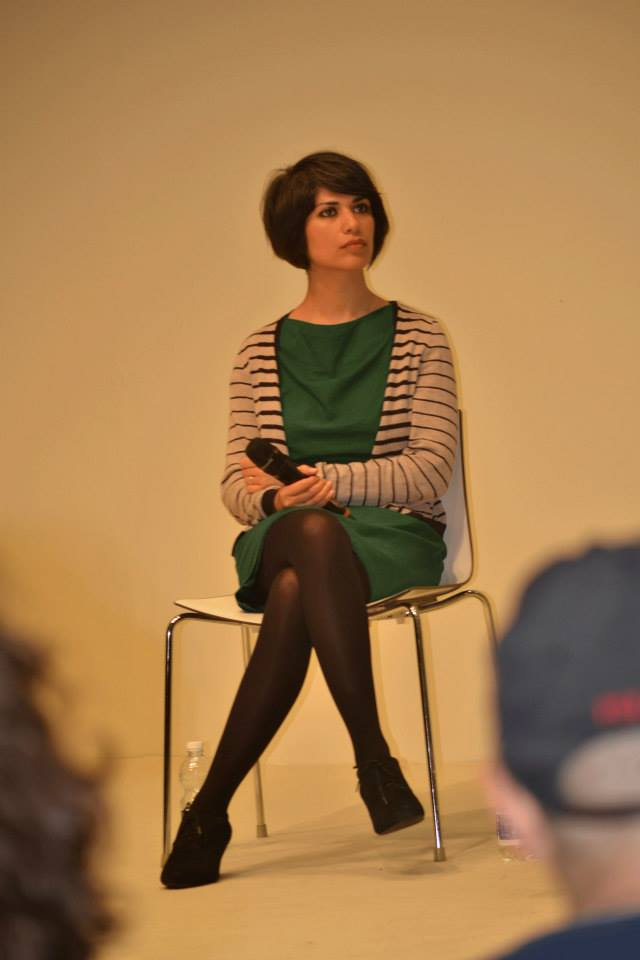

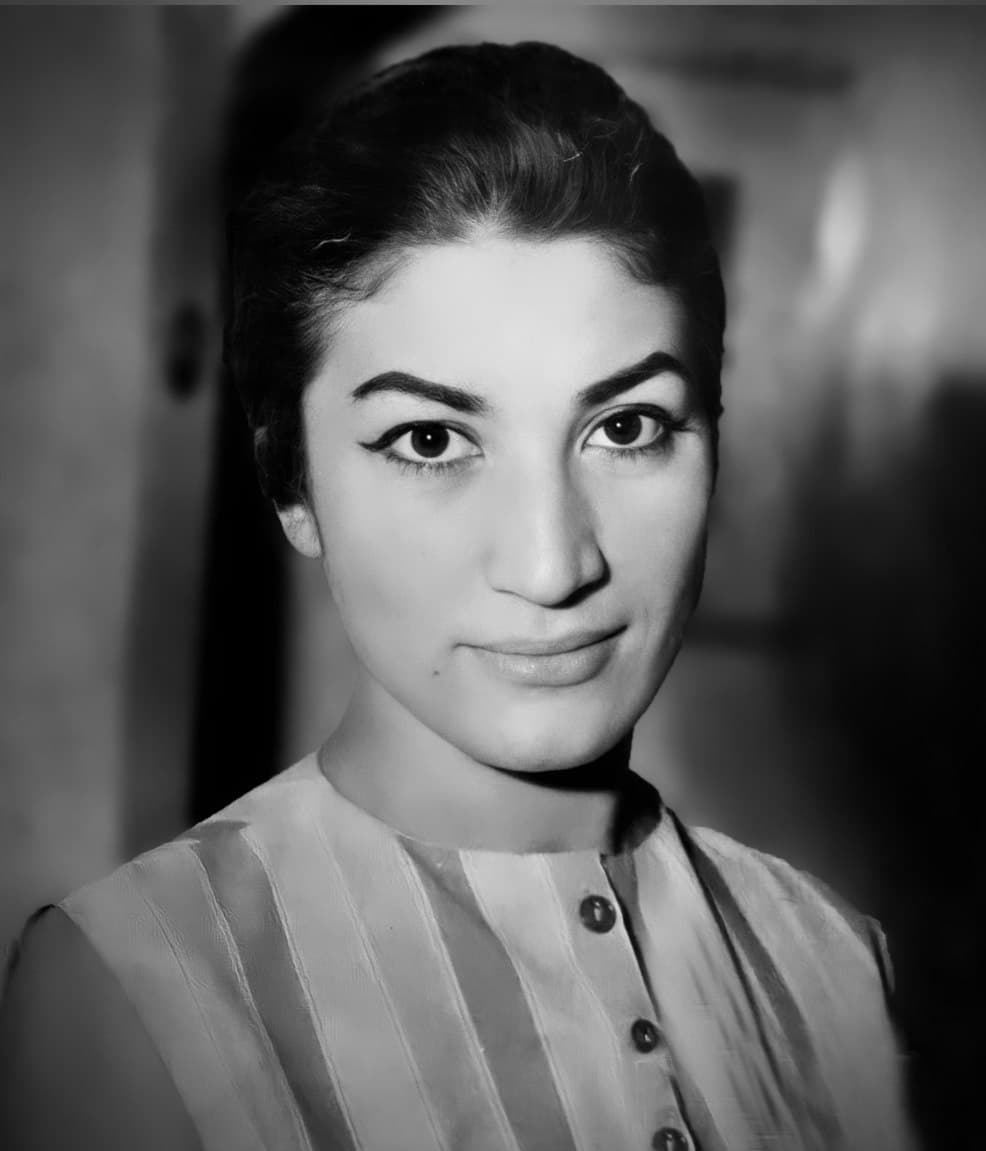

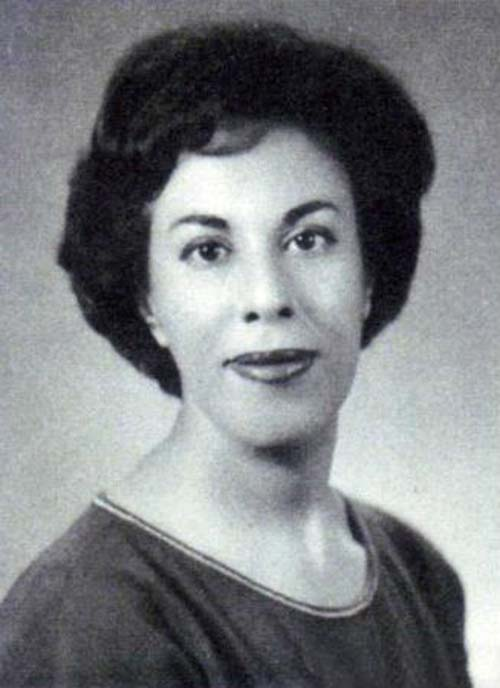

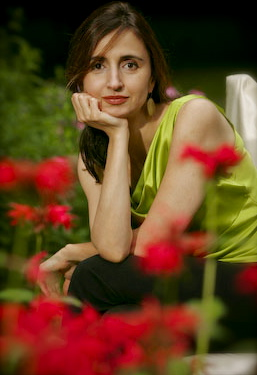

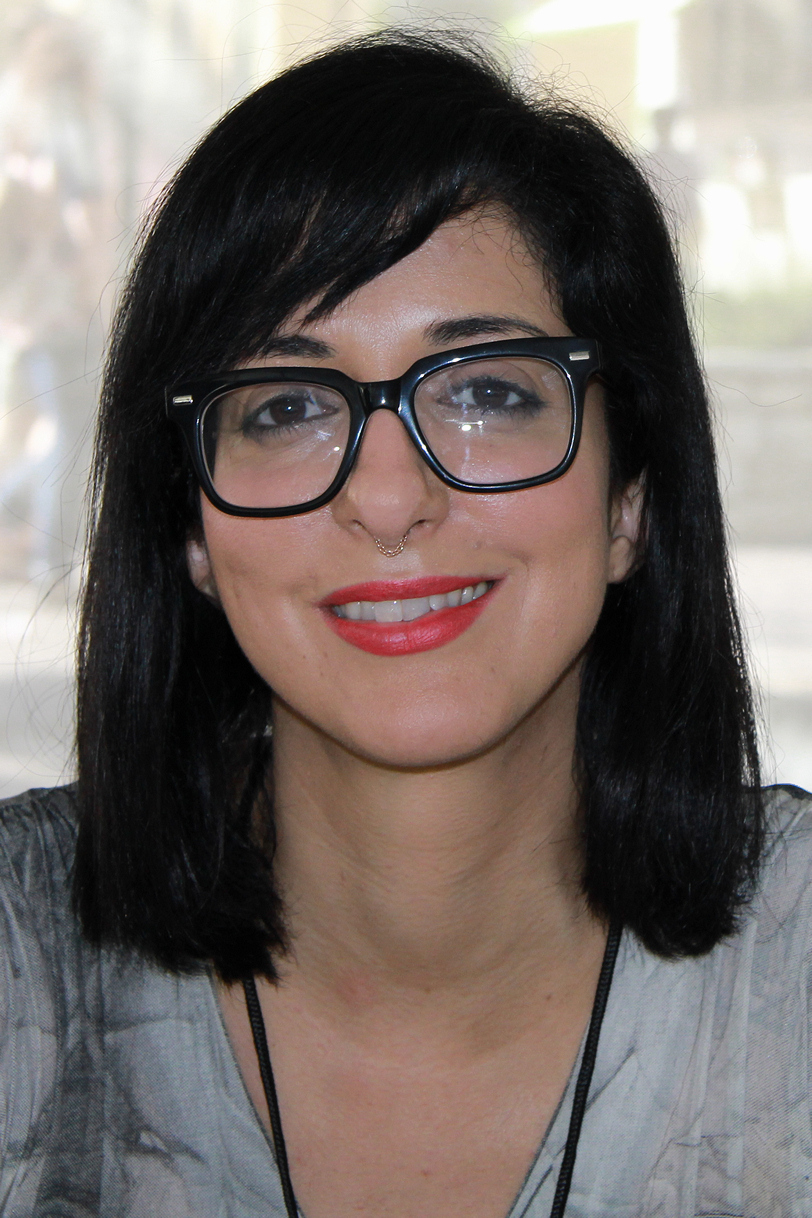

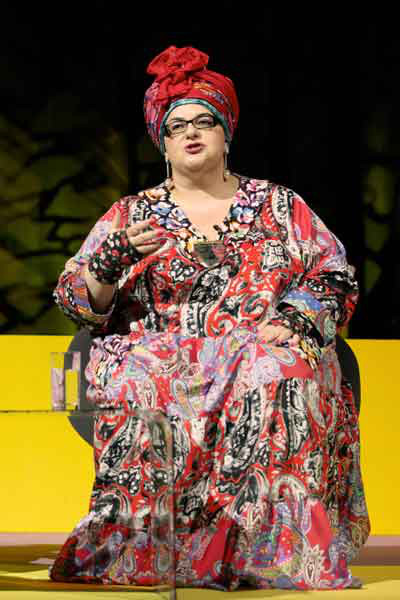

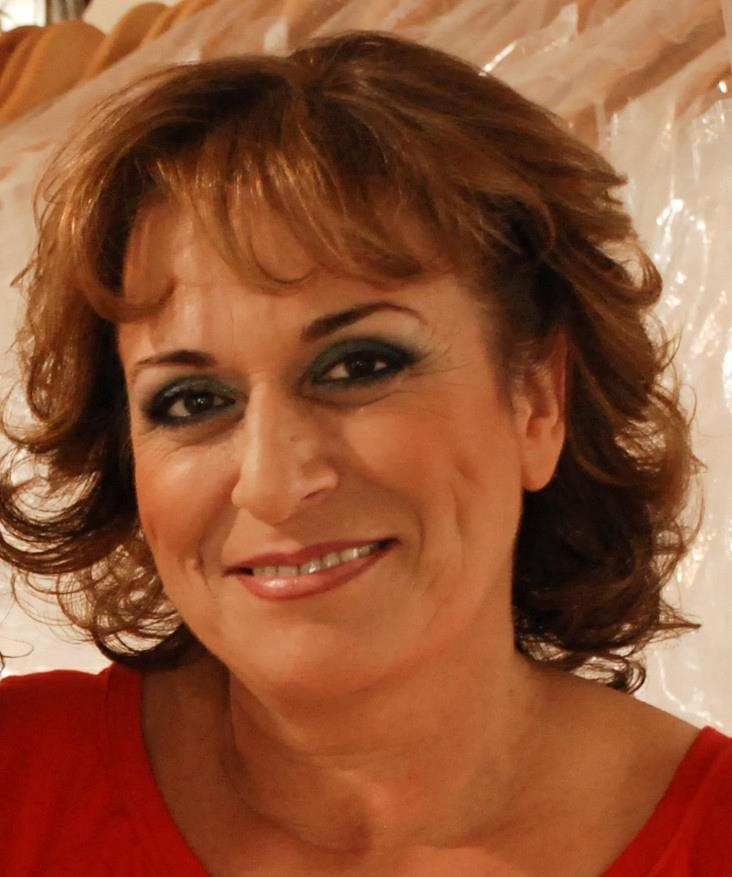

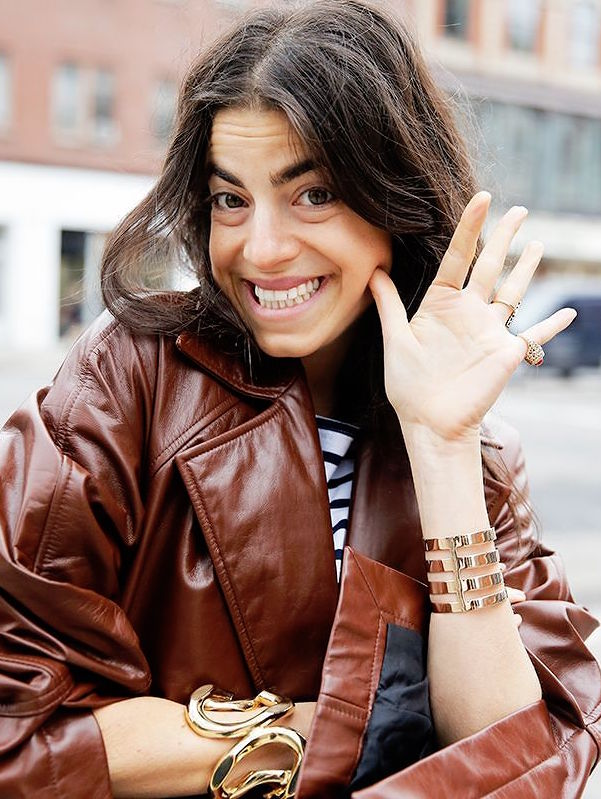

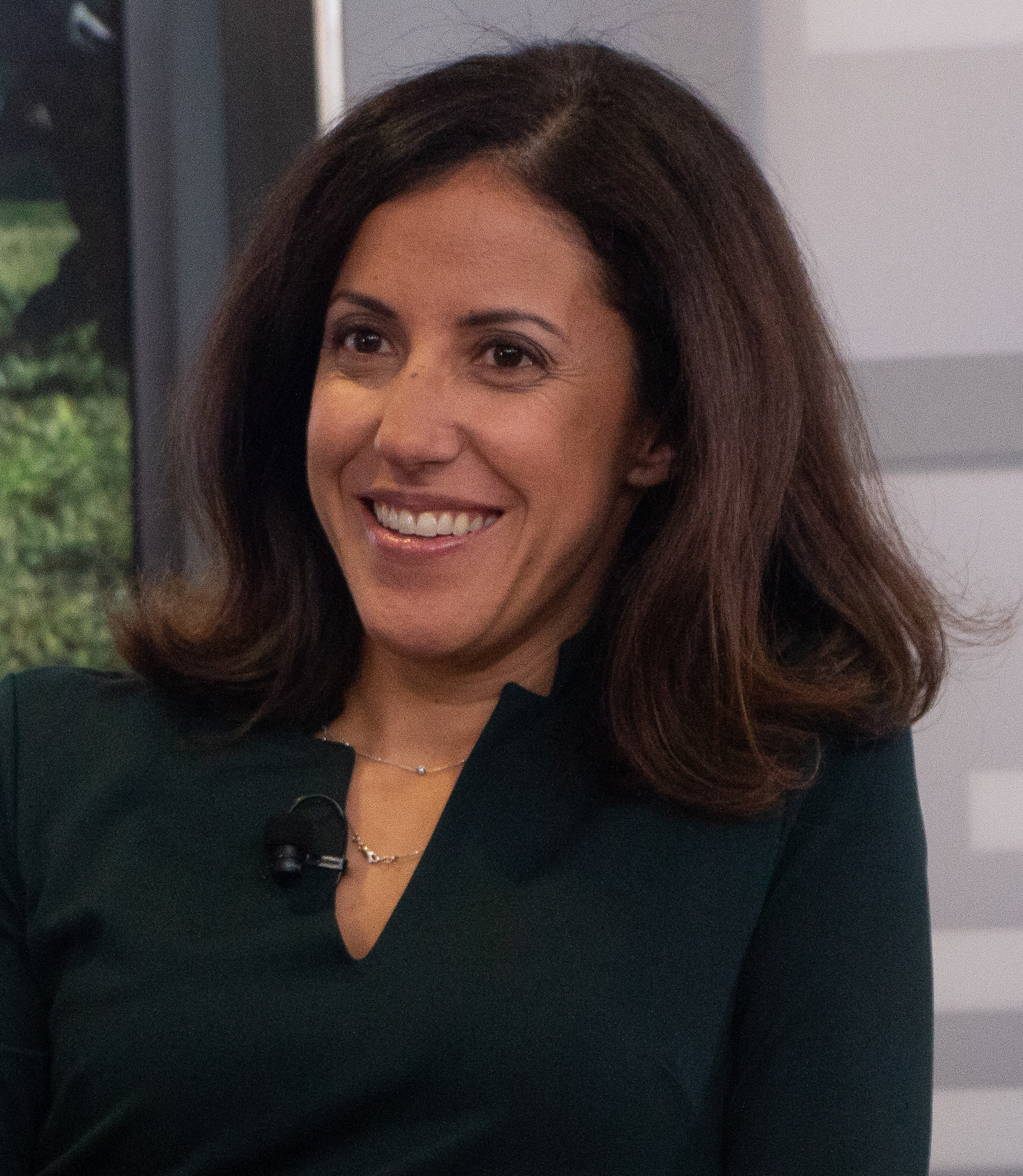

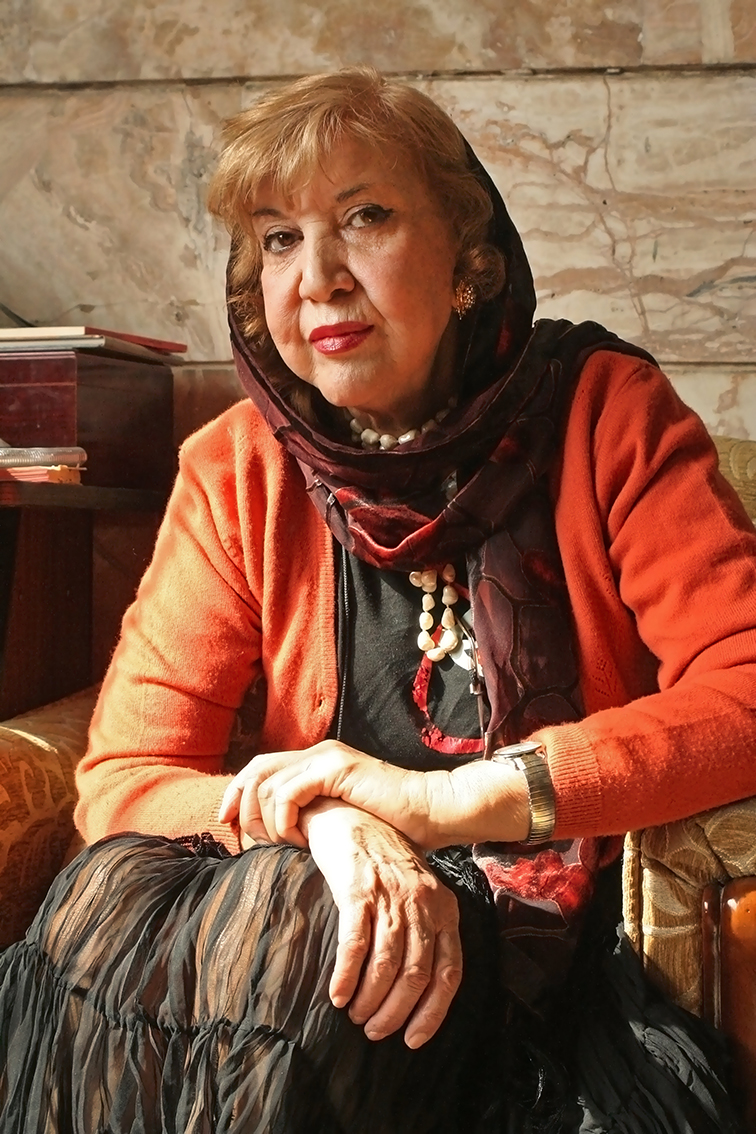

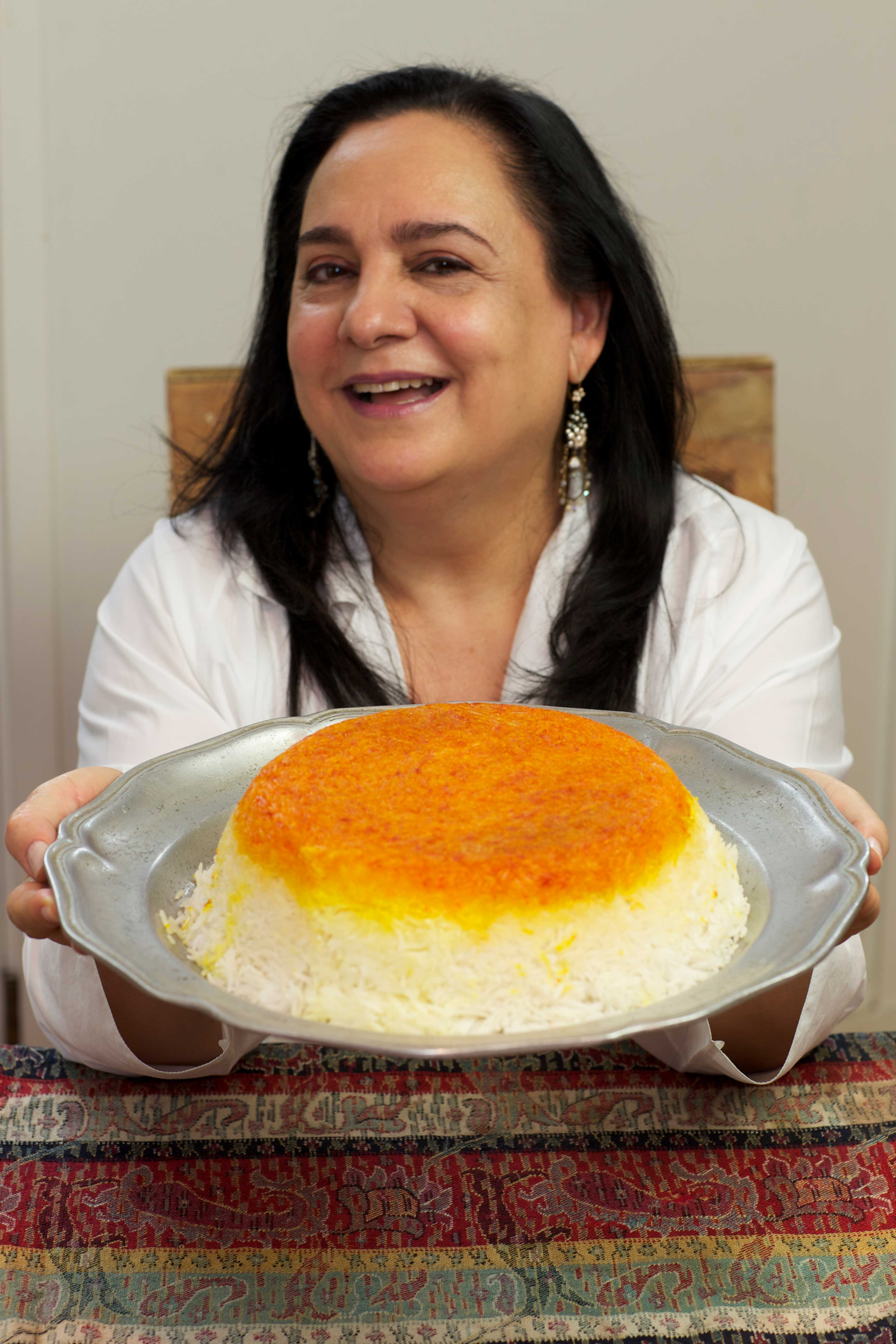

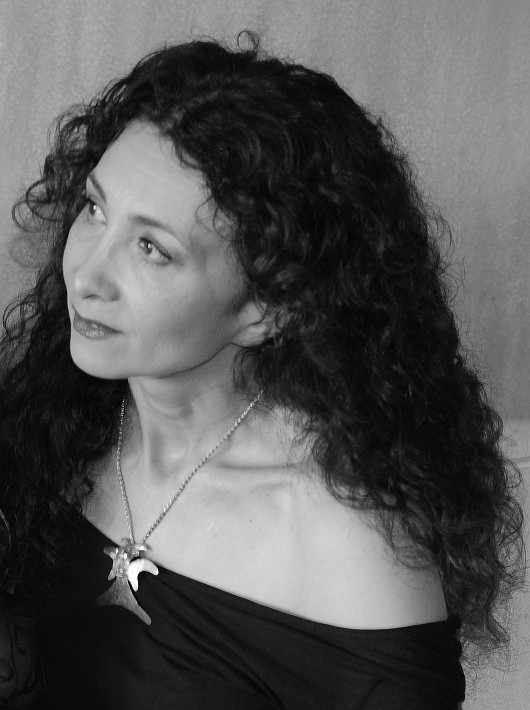

== Business ==
- Afsaneh Beschloss (born 1956), Iranian-born American former treasurer of the World Bank, economist, entrepreneur, and investor, CEO of RockCreek, an investment firm that she founded
- Mandana Dayani (born 1982), Iranian-American businesswoman and media executive
- Sepideh Nasiri (born c. 1981/82), Iranian-American founder of Persian Women In Tech (PWIT)
- Shahrzad Rafati (born 1979), Iranian-Canadian CEO of BroadbandTV Corp (BBTV)
- Maryam Rofougaran (born 1968), Iranian-American electrical engineer, CEO and co-founder of Innovent Systems, Inc. and Movandi; member of the CNBC CEO Council
- Sheherazade Semsar-de Boisséson (born 1968), French-Iranian founding CEO of POLITICO Europe, CEO of McCourt Global
- Marzieh Shah-Daei (born 1962), former executive director of National Petrochemical Company; Iranian deputy minister of Petroleum (2017–19)
- Farzaneh Sharafbafi (born 1973), former CEO of Iran Air
Iranian businesswomen

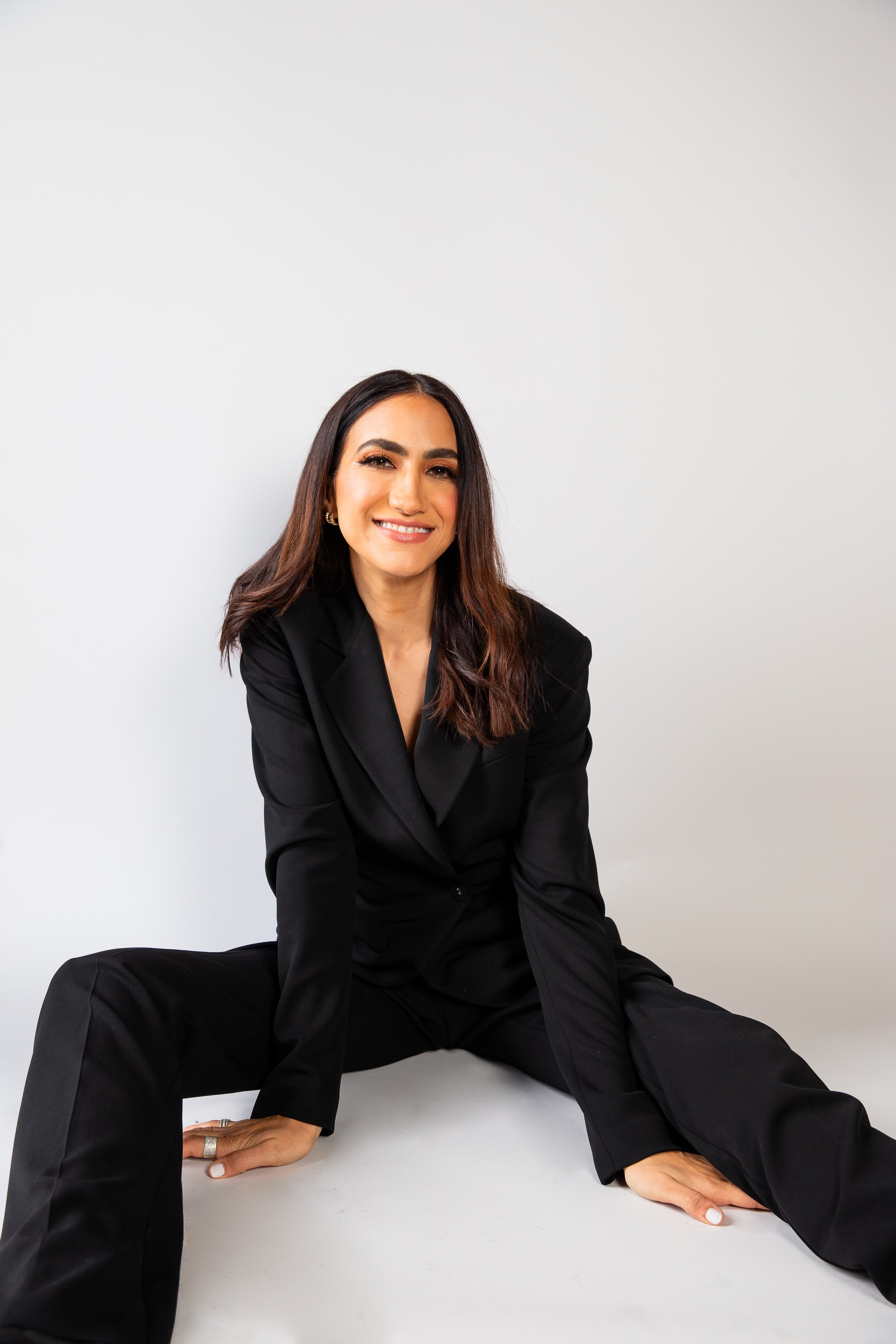

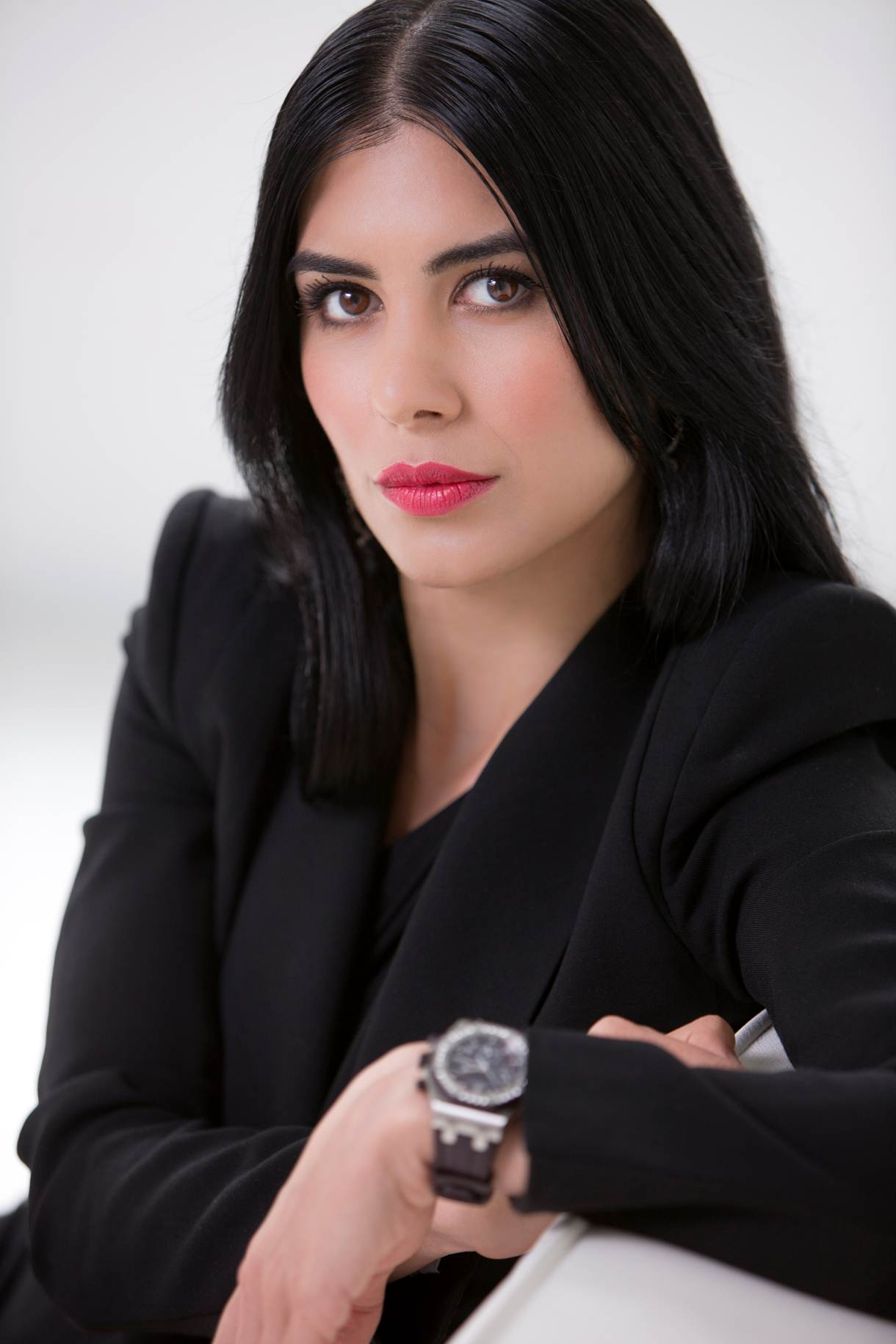

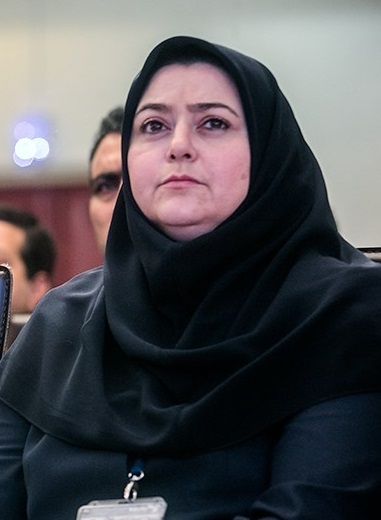

== Athletes ==
- Forough Abbasi (born 1993), Olympic alpine skier
- Kimia Alizadeh (born 1998), Iranian-born Bulgarian taekwondo athlete, first Iranian female Olympic medalist
- Padideh Boloorizadeh (born 1974), Asian pentathlon champion, captain of Iranian national volleyball team
- Leila Ebrahimi (born 1979), former runner
- Nasimeh Gholami (born 1985), futsal player; on the Iran women's national futsal team
- Vida Halimian (born 1988), compound archer
- Marjan Kalhor (born 1988), Iranian-French Olympic alpine skier
- Janet Kohan-Sedq (1945–1972), Olympic track and field runner
- Shima Mehri (born 1980), motorcyclist; based in Dubai
- Mahtab Parsamehr (born 1989), archer
- Aravane Rezaï (born 1987), French–Iranian tennis player
- Maryam Sedarati (born 1950), former high jumper; first Iranian woman to win a medal at an international athletics competition in 1973
- Laleh Seddigh (born 1977), race car driver, and rally champion of Iran
- Behnaz Shafiei (born 1989), motocross rider
Iranian women athletes

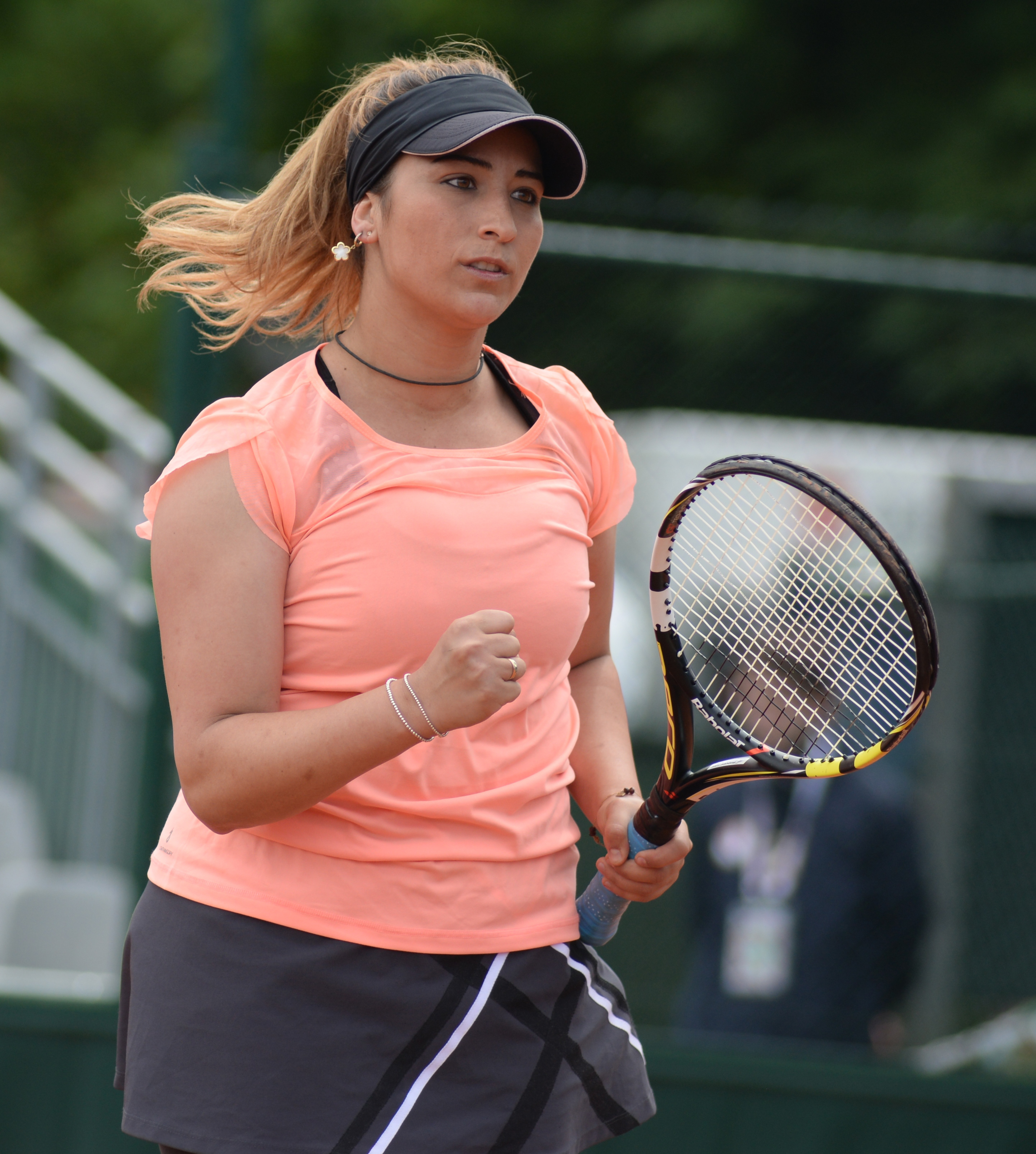

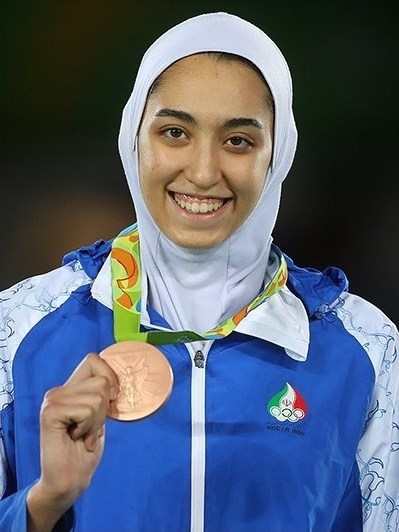

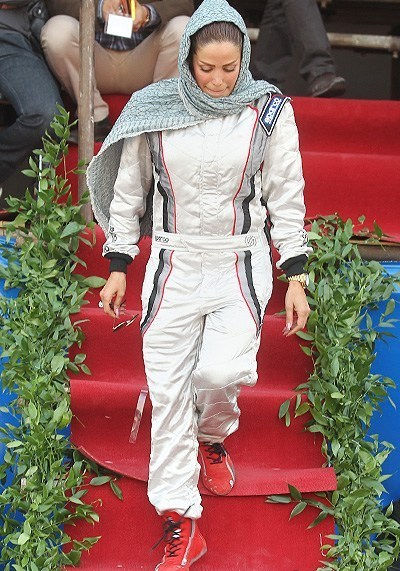

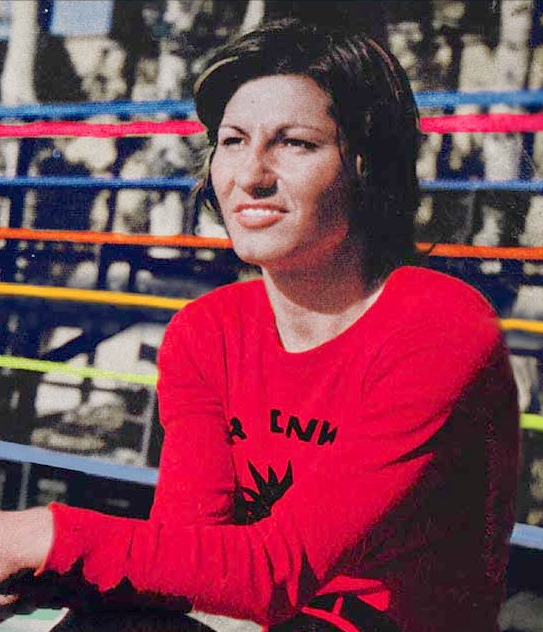

== Politicians ==
- Masoumeh Abad (born 1962), conservative politician, author, university professor, served as the Iranian Ambassador to Finland
- Marzieh Afkham (born c. 1962/63), Iranian ambassador to Slovenia, was Iranian ambassador to Malaysia
- Mahnaz Afkhami (born 1941), women's rights activist, author, was first minister of Women's Affairs in Iran (1976–78), and second woman in the world to hold the position; former professor of English Literature at the National University, and former secretary general of the Women's Organization of Iran; lives in Maryland
- Haleh Afshar (1941–2022; also known as the Baroness Afshar), Iranian-British life peer in the House of Lords, professor at the University of York
- Raumesh Akbari (born 1984), Iranian-American and Black politician and lawyer, member of the Tennessee Senate
- Goli Ameri (born 1956), Iranian-American businesswoman and former diplomat, U.S. assistant secretary of State for Educational and Cultural Affairs (2008–09) and U.S. under secretary general for Humanitarian Values and Diplomacy (2010–12)
- Nusrat Bhutto (1929–2011), Iranian-born Pakistani First Lady of Pakistan (1971–73), 2nd chairperson of the social democratic Pakistan People's Party (1979–84), senior minister of Pakistan (1989–90)
- Masoumeh Ebtekar (born 1960), diplomat, vice president of Iran for Women and Family Affairs (2017–21), vice president of Iran Head of Department of Environment (2013–17), member of the City Council of Tehran (2007–13); former spokeswoman for the students in the Iran hostage crisis; professor of immunology
- Shahla Habibi (1958–2017), Iran's presidential advisor on Women's Affairs (1991–97)
- Fatemeh Haghighatjou (born 1968), member of Parliament of Iran (2000–04, when she resigned); lives in the United States
- Fatemeh Javadi (born 1959), vice president of Iran for Environmental Protection and head of the Department of the Environment (2005–09)
- Anna Kaplan (née Monahemi) (born 1965), Iranian-American member of the New York State Senate (2019–22), attorney
- Farah Karimi (born 1960), Iranian-Dutch politician, member of the House of Representatives of the Netherlands (1998–2006), Senator for GroenLinks–PvdA in the Dutch Parliament since 2019
- Elaheh Koulaei (born 1956), member of Parliament (2000–04), and professor of political science at Tehran University
- Azar Majedi, communist activist, politician, and writer; lives in England
- Farrokhroo Parsa (1922–1980), physician, educator and politician in the Parliament of Iran (1963–68), minister of Education (1968–71), the first female cabinet minister of an Iranian government; executed by firing squad in 1980, following the Iranian Revolution
- Nasrin Soltankhah (born 1963), politician, member of the Tehran City Council, served as vice president of Iran for Women's Affairs (2009–13), under Mahmoud Ahmadinejad
Iranian women politicians

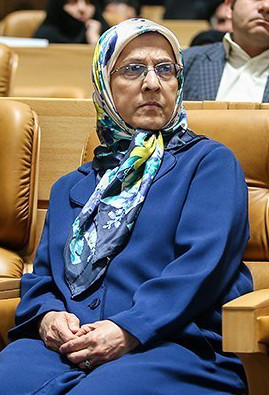

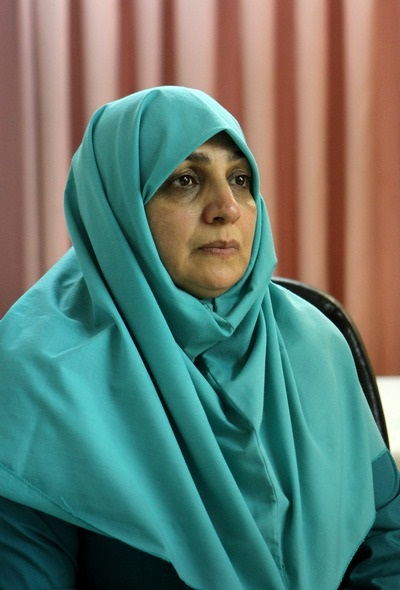

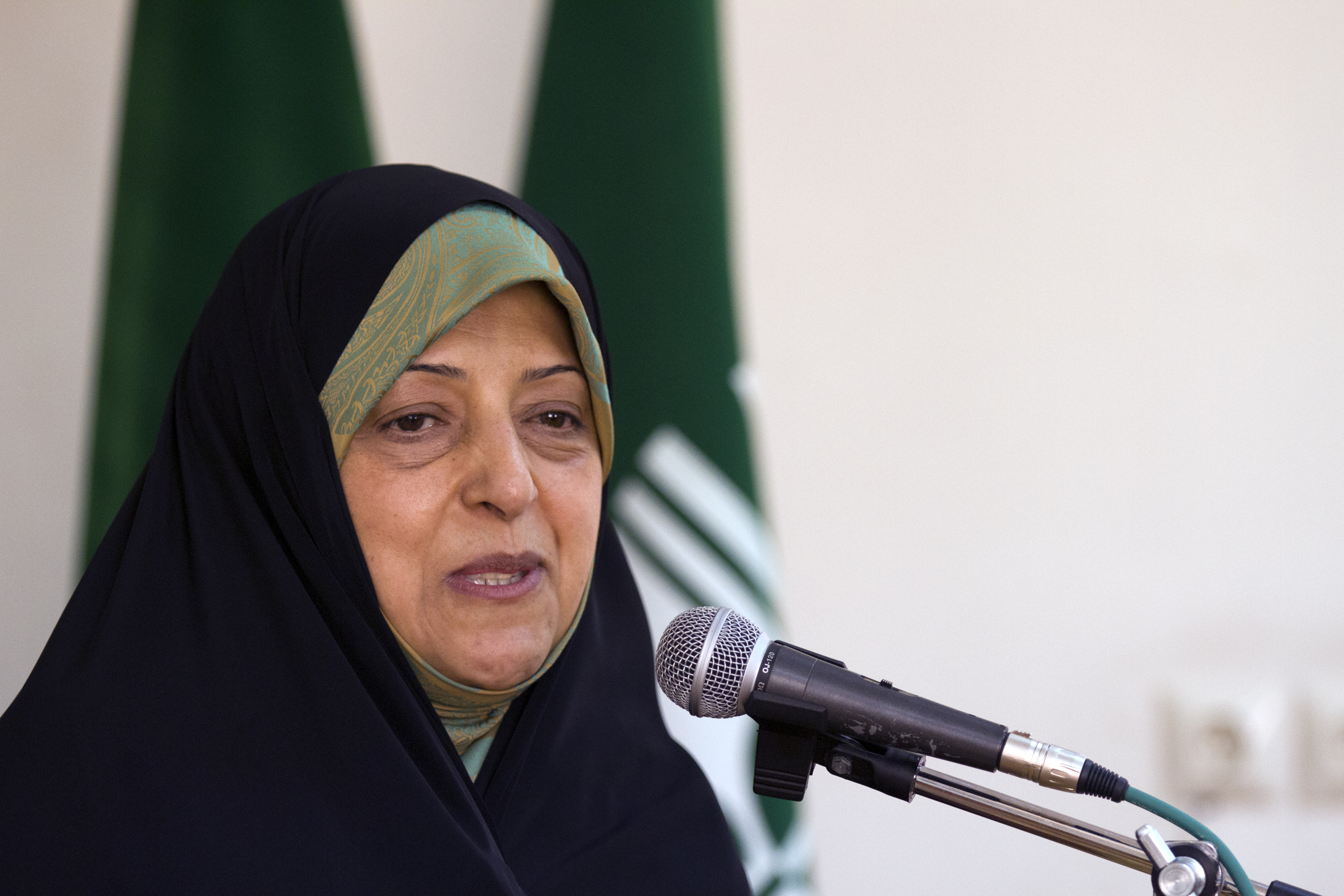

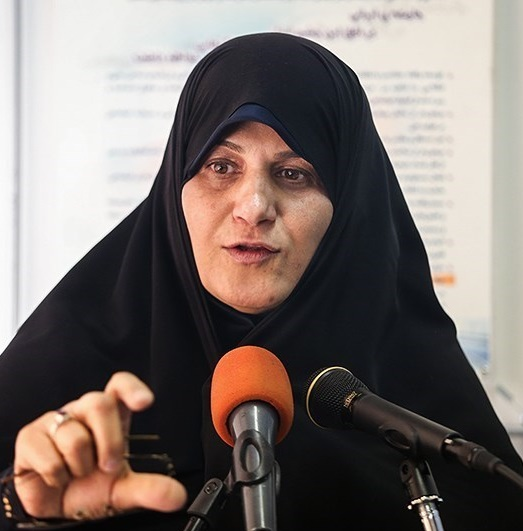

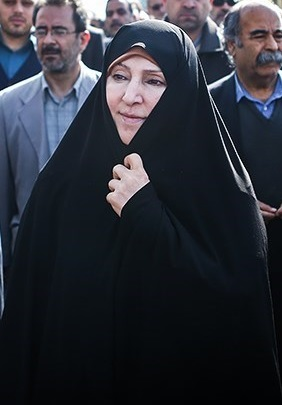

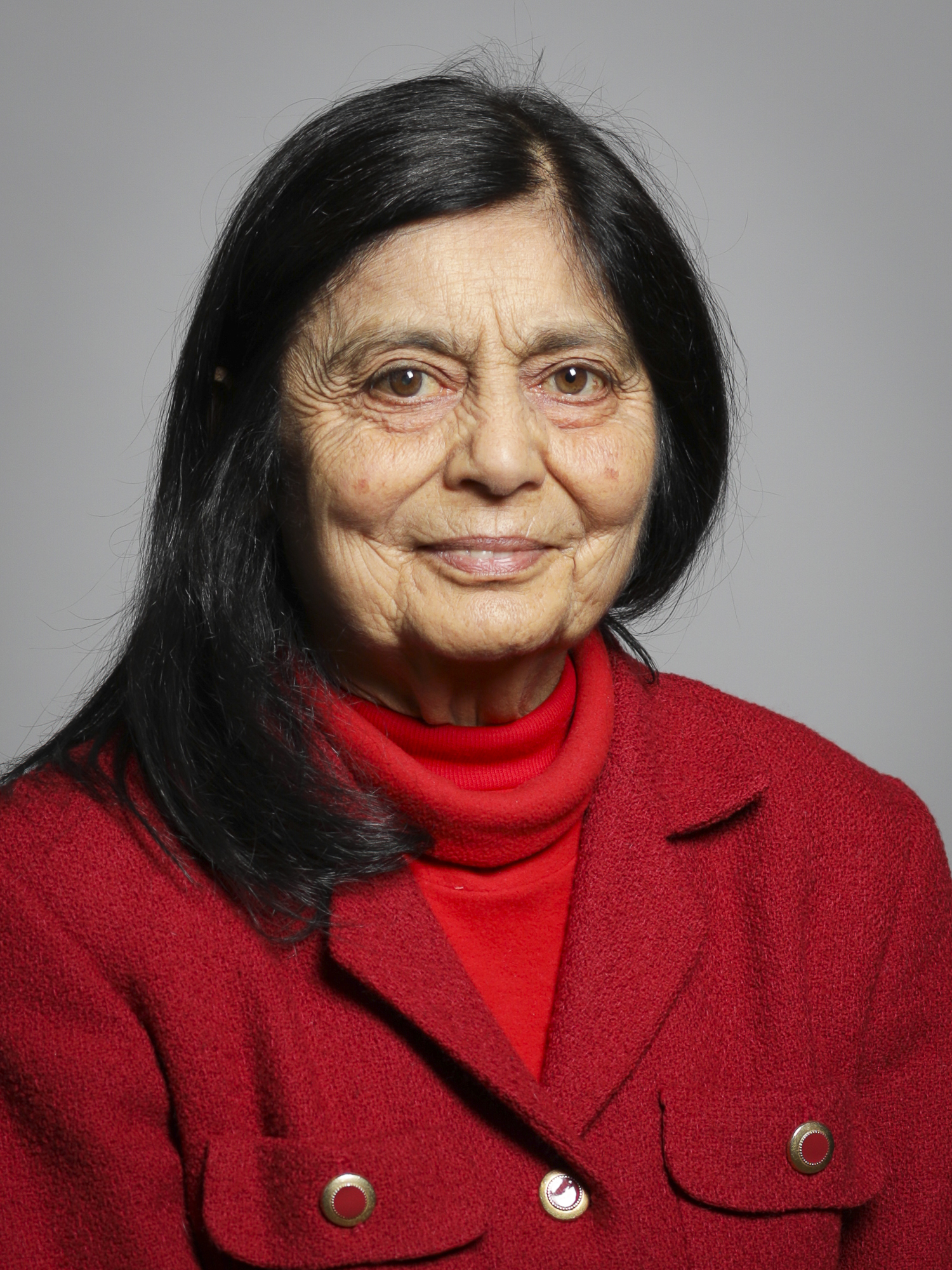

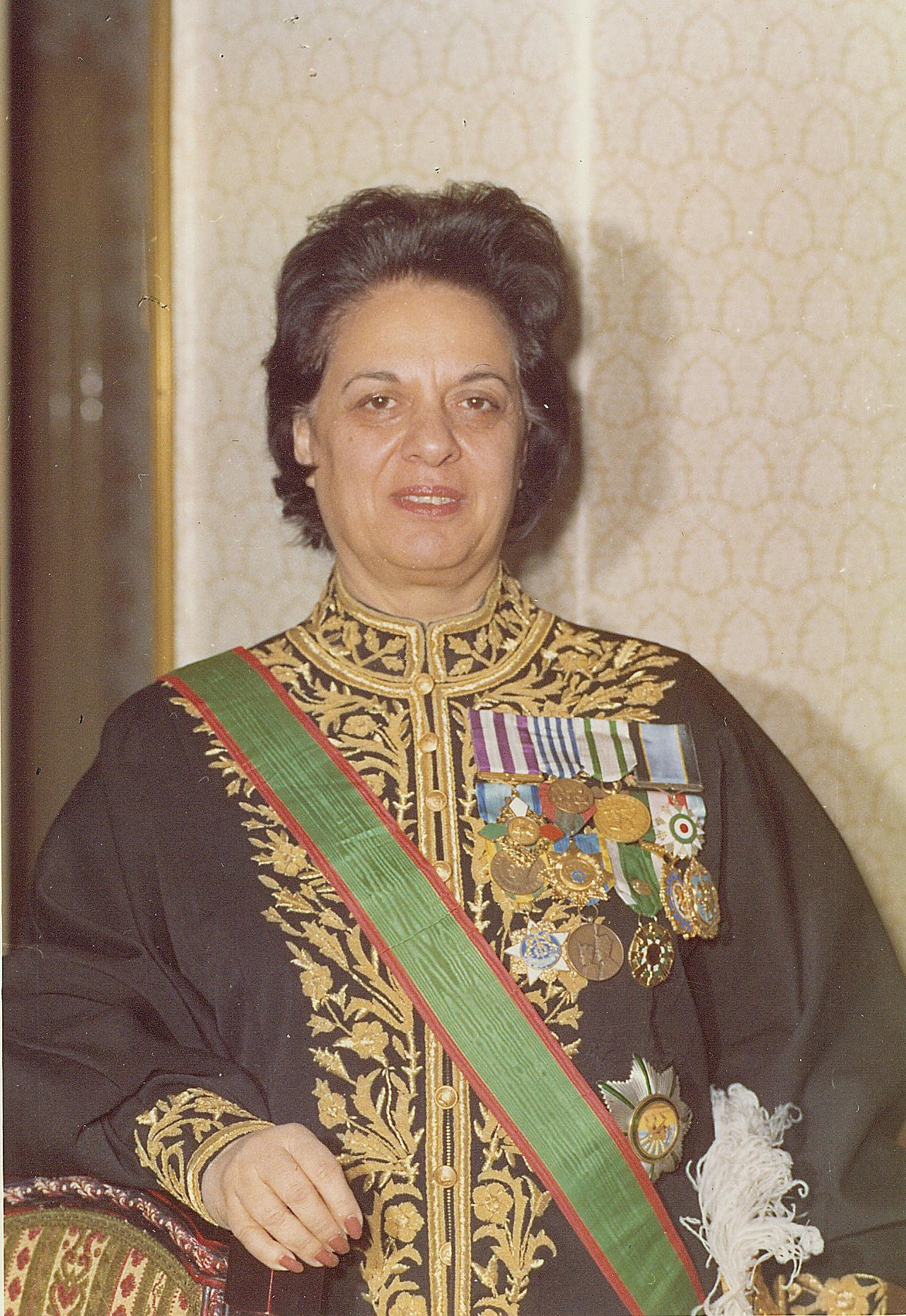

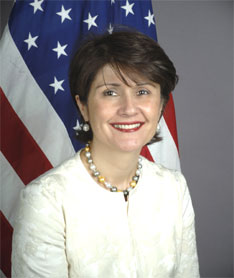

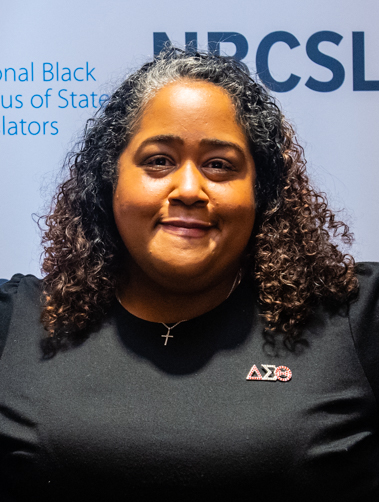

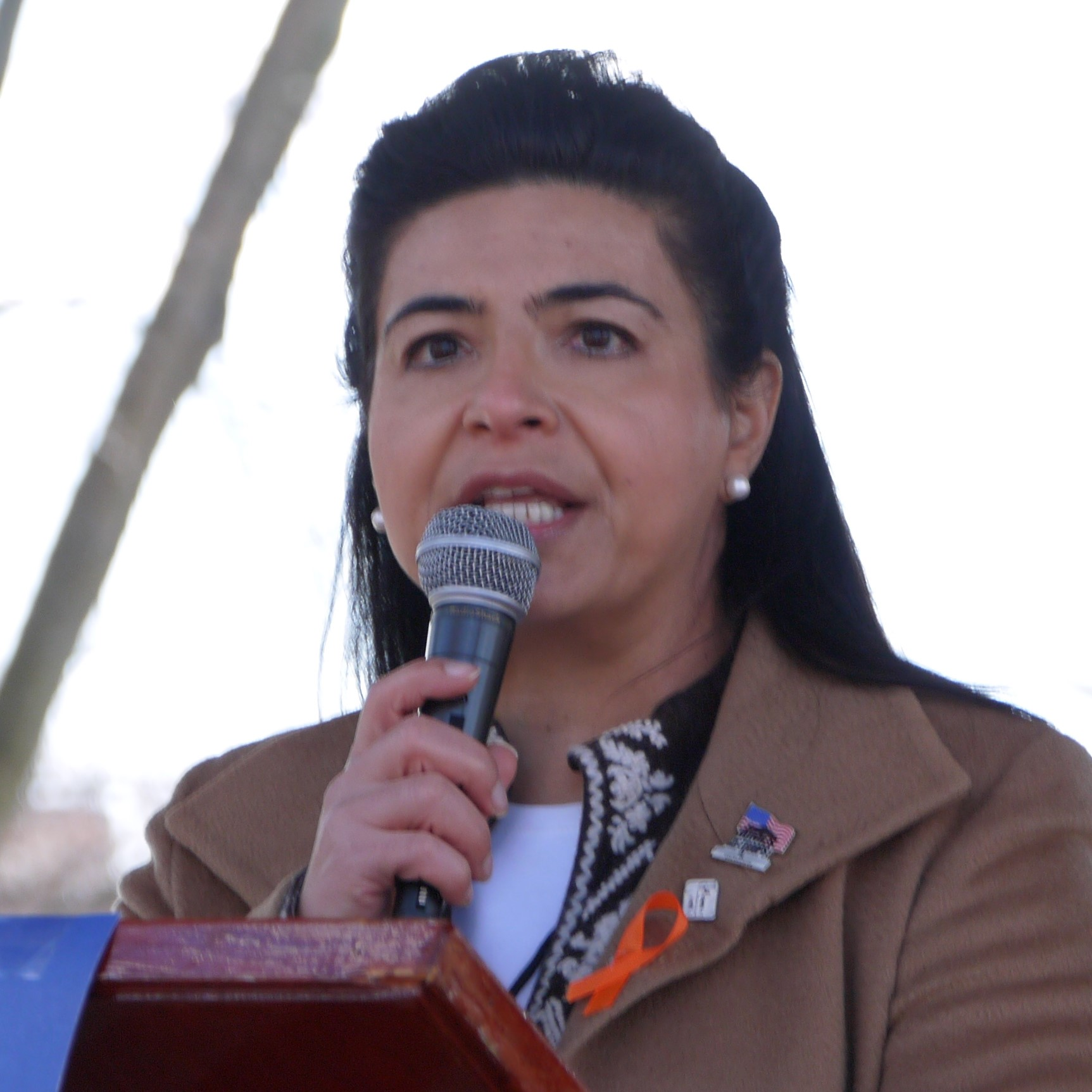

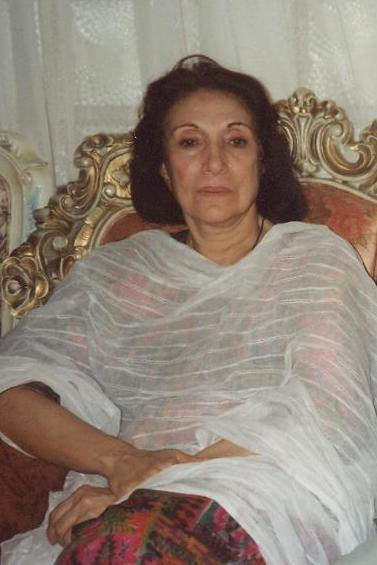

== Royalty ==
- Parysatis (died c. 401–385 BC), daughter of Artaxerxes I, Emperor of Persia and Andia of Babylon
- Stateira II (? – 323 BC; also known as Barsine), wife of Alexander the Great; daughter of Stateira I and Darius III of Persia; murdered by Roxana, Alexander's other wife, after his death
- Ifra Hormizd, wife of Shah Hormizd II and mother of Shapur the Great, held the position of Regent of the Sassanian Empire (309–325)
- Shushandukht, wife of Yazdegerd I, the Sasanian emperor in 399–420, and mother of Bahram V, his successor
- Shirin (c. 575 AD – 628 AD), Persian Queen, wife of the Sasanian Empire Shahanshah (English: the king of kings), Khosrow Parviz
- Boran (c. 590–632; also known as Purandokht), Sassanid crown princess and queen, daughter of Khosrow II
- Shahr Banu (c. 7th century), princess; supposedly a daughter of Yazdegerd III, the last Sassanid emperor of Persia
- Tajlu Khanum (c. 1485–1540), queen mother of Safavid Shah Tahmasp I
- Khayr al-Nisa Begum (died 1579), Mar'ashi princess, wife of Safavid Shah Mohammad Khodabanda and mother of Abbas the Great, de facto governed Iran in 1578–79
- Nur Jahan (1577–1645; also known as Mehr-un-Nissa), Empress; last wife of the Mughal emperor Jahangir
- Anna Khanum (died. 1647), queen mother of Safavid Shah Abbas II
- Maryam Khanom (1770–1843), royal consort of Agha Mohammad Shah (r. 1789–1797), and then the royal consort of Agha Mohammad's nephew and successor Fath-Ali Shah Qajar (r. 1797–1834)
- Malek Jahan Khanom (1805–1873), queen mother of Naser al-Din Shah Qajar; influential figure in Qajar court politics and the succession to the throne in 1848
- Anis al-Dawla (c. 1842–1896), influential wife of Naser al-Din Shah Qajar; played a role in royal court politics
- Tadj al-Saltaneh (1884–1936), Qajar princess and daughter of Naser al-Din Shah Qajar; writer and advocate of women's rights who supported the Persian Constitutional Revolution
- Turan Amirsoleimani (1905–1995), third wife of Reza Shah; moved to France
- Tadj ol-Molouk (1896–1982; also known as Nimtâj Âyromlu), Queen of Iran; wife of Reza Shah and mother to Shah Mohammad Reza Pahlavi; moved to Mexico
- Hamdam al-Saltaneh Pahlavi (1903–1992), first child of Reza Shah and his first wife Maryam Savadkooh
- Esmat Dowlatshahi (1905–1995), 4th and last wife of Reza Shah, a member of the Qajar dynasty
- Shams Pahlavi (1917–1996), eldest daughter of Reza Shah and Tadj ol-Molouk; moved to California
- Ashraf Pahlavi (1919–2016; also known as Ashraf ol-Molouk Pahlavi), princess; twin sister of Shah Mohammad Reza Pahlavi; moved to Monaco
- Fatemeh Pahlavi (1928–1987), the 10th child of Reza Shah; moved to England
- Soraya Esfandiary Bakhtiari (1932–2001), Iranian-German actress and queen (1951-58); second wife of Shah Mohammad Reza Pahlavi; moved to France
- Farah Pahlavi (born 1938; also known as Farah Diba), empress and 3rd wife of Shah Mohammad Reza Pahlavi; moved to the United States and France
- Shahnaz Pahlavi (born 1940), princess; first child of the Shah of Iran, Mohammad Reza Pahlavi and his first wife Fawzia Fuad of Egypt; moved to Switzerland
- Leila Pahlavi (1970–2001), princess; youngest daughter of Shah Mohammad Reza Pahlavi and Farah Pahlavi; moved to the United States and England
Iranian women in royalty

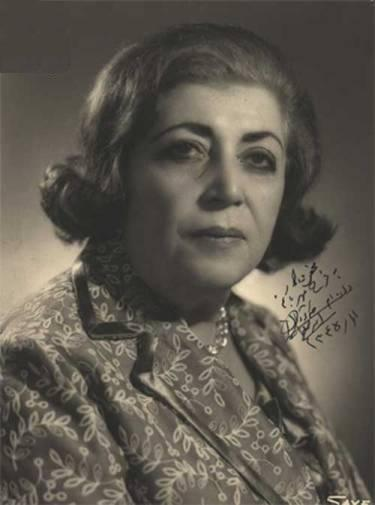

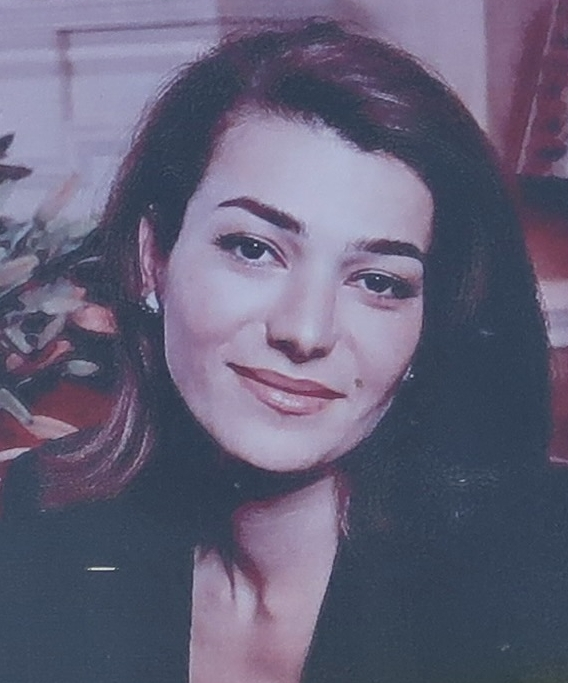

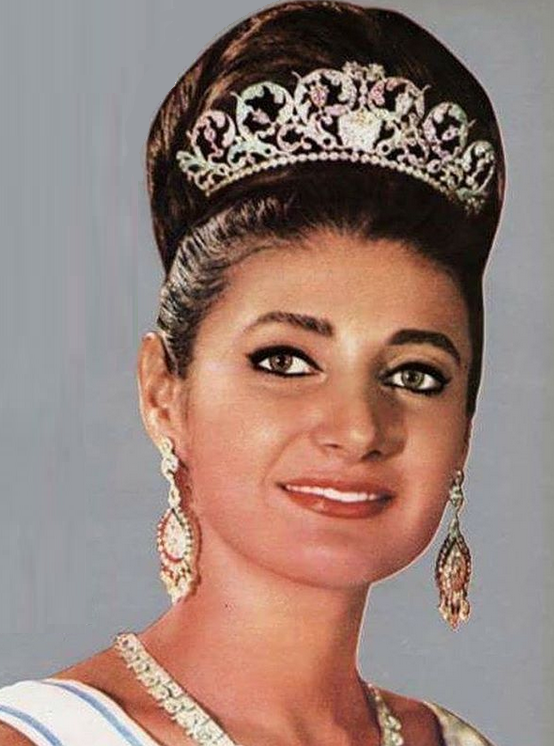

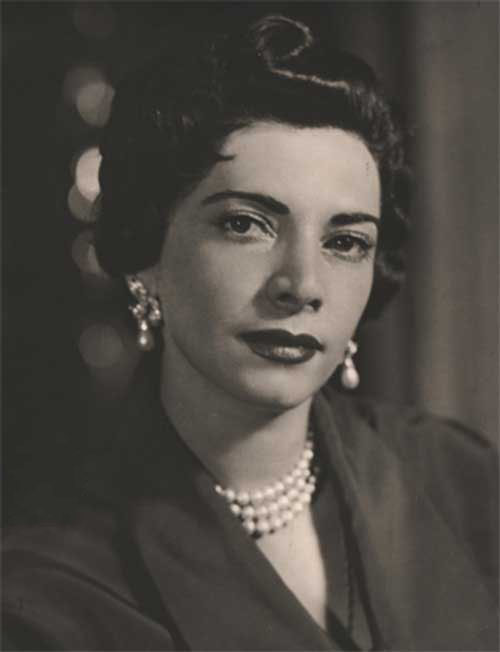

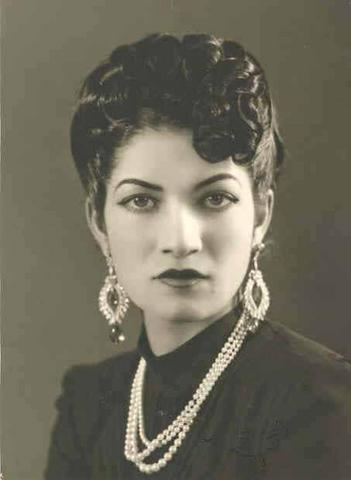

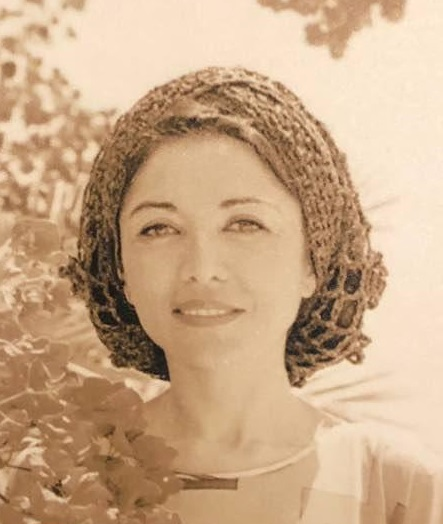

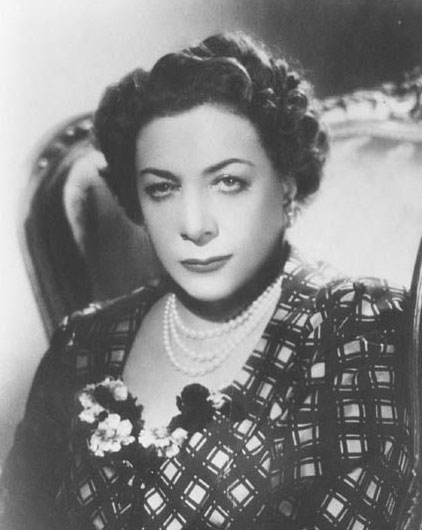

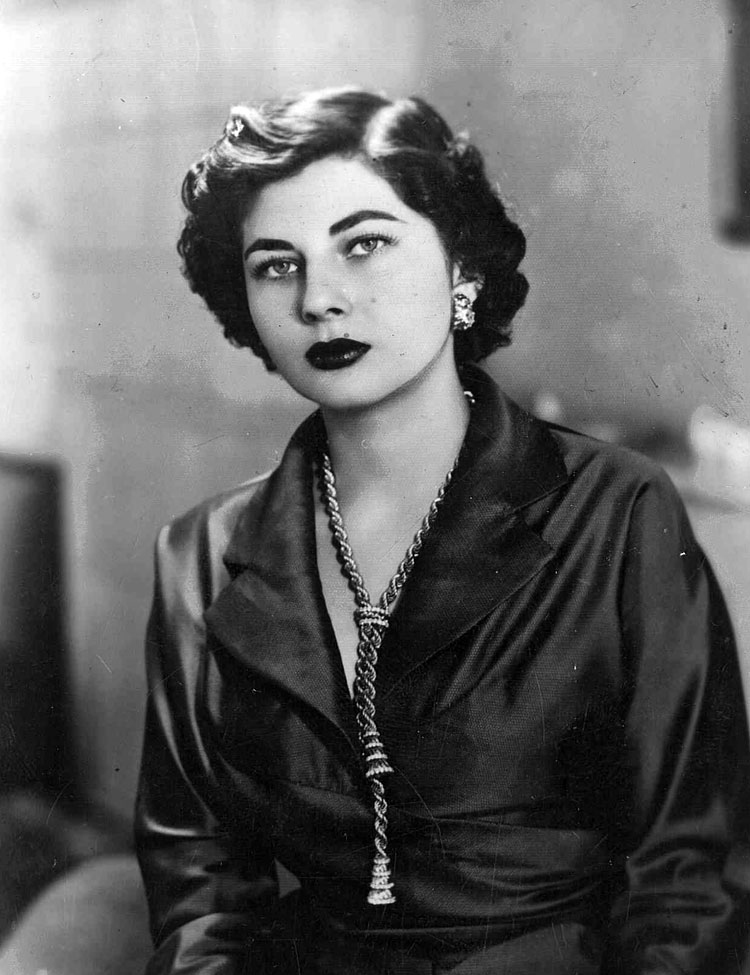

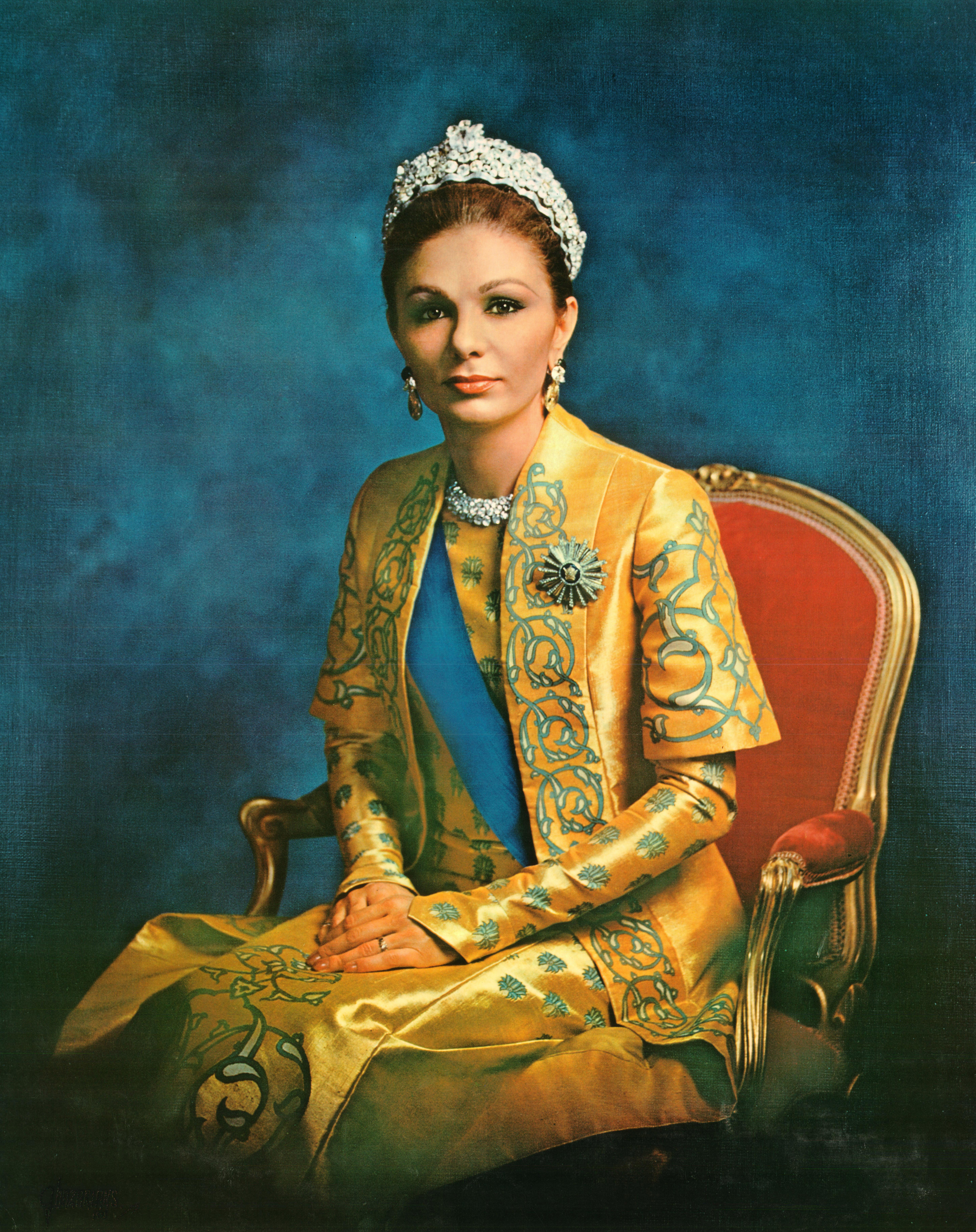

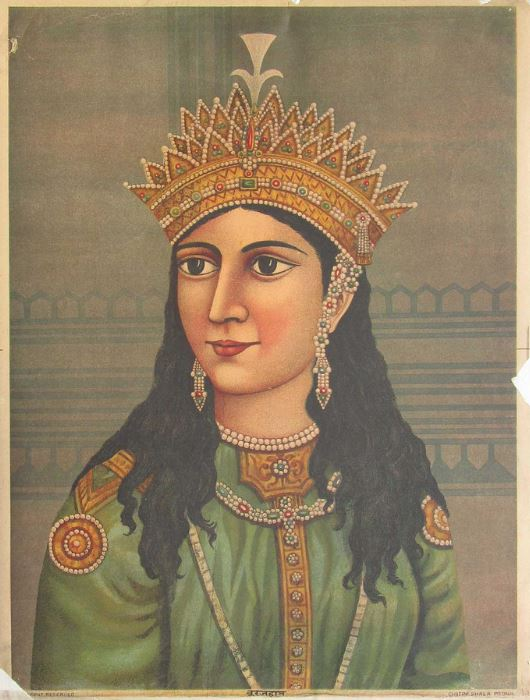

== Others ==
- Einat Admony (born 1971), Israeli-American chef, restaurateur, author and television personality
- Fateme Asadi (1960–1984), labeled first Iranian 'martyr', her body was found during post-Iran–Iraq War explorations
- Qudsiyyih Khanum Ashraf (1889–1976), Bahá'i teacher and midwife
- Shohreh Bayat (born 1987), international chess arbiter for FIDE, awarded an International Women of Courage Award for being a champion for women’s rights, based in England
- Ladan and Laleh Bijani (1974–2003), conjoined twins
- Dorsa Derakhshani (born 1998), Iranian-American chess player and medical student; Woman Grandmaster and International Master; moved to the U.S. after being banned from the Iranian national chess team for not wearing a hijab during a tournament
- Sahar Khodayari (c.1990–2019), attempted to enter a sporting stadium disguised as a man in; she died by suicide
- Behnaz Mozakka, died in 7 July 2005 London bombings
- Sheila Nazarian (born 1989), Iranian-American plastic surgeon and television personality
- Shadi Paridar (born 1986), chess player, Woman Grandmaster
- Atousa Pourkashiyan (born 1988), Iranian-American chess player; Woman Grandmaster
- Effat Tejaratchi (1917–1999), first Iranian woman to fly an airplane
- Badri Teymourtash (1908–1995), first female Iranian doctor; founder of School of Dentistry, Mashad University; sister of Abdolhossein Teymourtash
- Dahlia Khajeei (born 1988 Vancouver, Canada), Trademark - the Woman who broke omertà
Other Iranian women

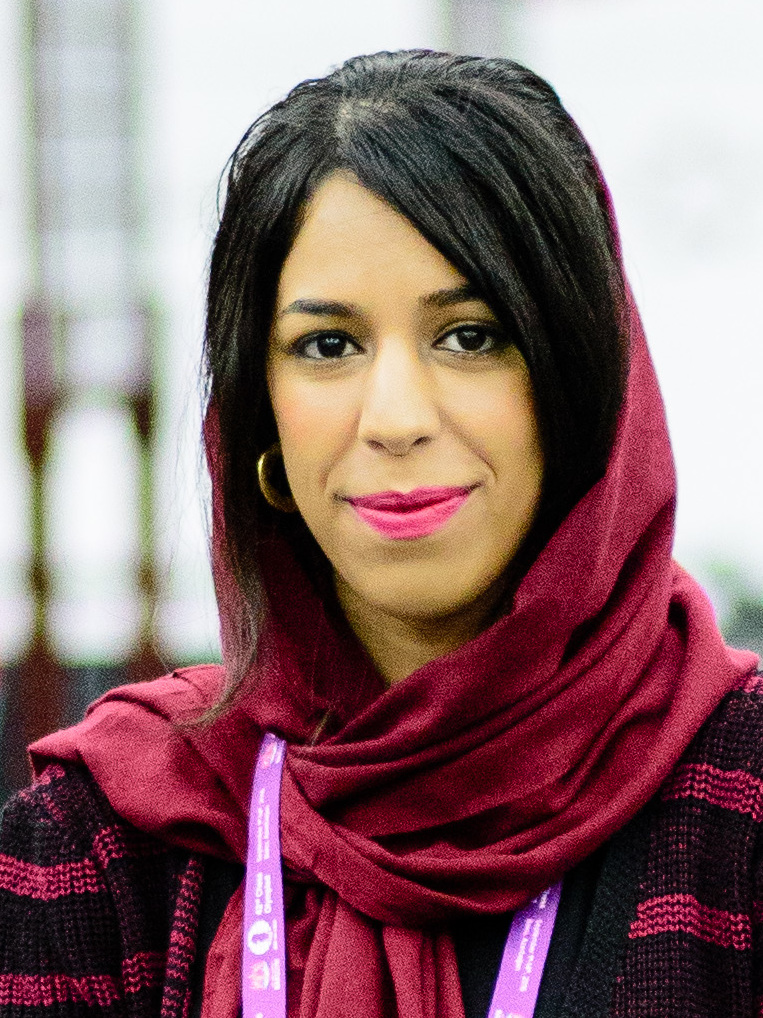

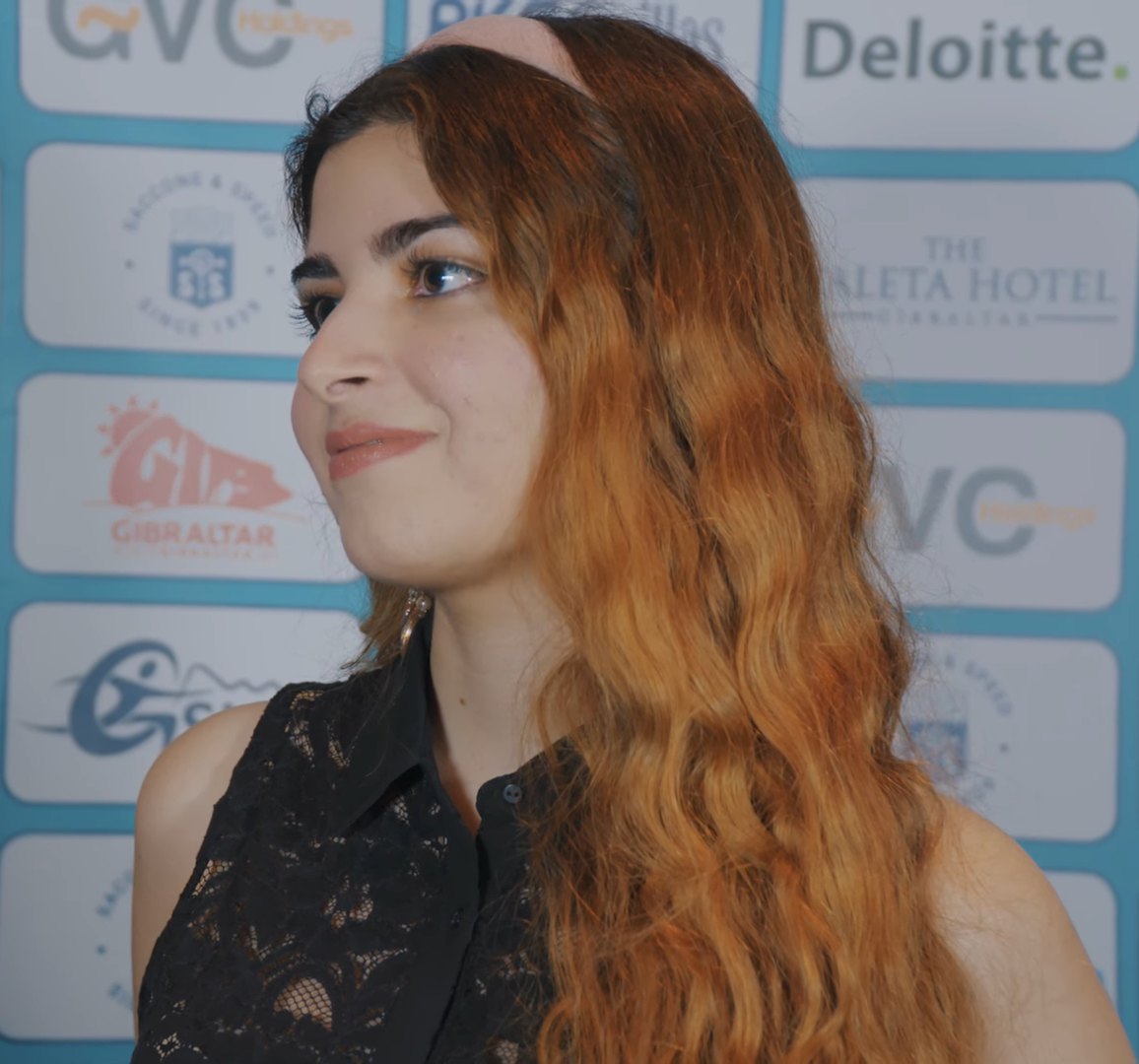

== See also ==
- List of spouses of the president of Iran
- List of royal consorts of Iran
