= List of Iranian women writers =

This is a list of women writers who were born in Iran or whose writings are closely associated with that country.

== A ==
- Masoumeh Abad (born 1962), activist, politician, and non-fiction author
- Janet Afary (born 1960), feminist, historian, non-fiction writer
- Mahnaz Afkhami (born 1941), feminist, non-fiction writer, now in the United States
- Pegah Ahmadi (born 1974), poet, critic, translator
- Mahshid Amirshahi (born 1937), novelist, short story writer, critic, journalist, translator
- Jaleh Amouzgar (born 1939), linguist, anthropologist, academic
- Akram Monfared Arya (born 1946), pilot, poet, short story writer, artist, now living in Sweden, writes in Persian, Swedish and English
- Lady Amin (1886–1983), mystic, author of works on Islamic sciences
- Mahshid Amirshahi (born 1937), novelist, short story writer, critic, journalist, translator
- Noushafarin Ansari (born 1939), librarian, educator, journalist
- Mastoureh Ardalan (1805–1848), Kurdish poet, philosopher, historian
- Fakhr-Ozma Arghun (1898–1966), poet, teacher, journalist, feminist
- Mina Assadi (born 1943), poet, journalist, living in Sweden
- Bibi Khanoom Astarabadi (c.1858–1921), feminist, literary historian
- Ghazaleh Alizadeh (1949–1996), writer, poet

== B ==
- Rakhshan Bani-E'temad (born 1954), film director, screenwriter
- Najmieh Batmanglij (born 1957), Iranian-American cookbook writer
- Simin Behbahani (1927–2014), acclaimed poet
- Niloofar Beyzaie (born 1967), playwright, theatre director, living in German
- Taraneh Boroumand playwright, writer, poet, translator
- Mona Borzouei, (born 1984), poet and songwriter

== D ==
- Simin Daneshvar (1921–2012), acclaimed early female novelist, short story writer, translator, educator
- Soraya Darabi (born 1955), journalist, trade union activist
- Sahar Delijani (born 1983), widely translated novelist, author of Children of the Jacaranda Tree, living between the United States and Italy
- Sediqeh Dowlatabadi (1882–1961), feminist, journalist
- Firoozeh Dumas (born 1965), Iranian-American memoirist, humorous writer, author of Funny in Farsi

== E ==
- Shirin Ebadi (born 1947), Nobel peace prize winner, human rights activist, non-fiction writer
- Amanda Enayati (born 1967), columnist, communication strategist
- Camelia Entekhabifard (born 1973), poet, journalist, and memoirist, living in the United States
- Parvin E'tesami (1907–1941), acclaimed classical poet, essayist
- Mansoureh Ettehadieh (graduated 1956), historian, educator, non-fiction writer, novelist
- Tahereh Eybod (born 1963), author, researcher, instructor, critic, and journalist.

== F ==
- Forough Farrokhzad (1935–1967), influential poet, film director, poetry translated into several languages including English
- Pooran Farrokhzad, since the 1990s: poet, playwright, encyclopedist
- Nazila Fathi (born 1970), author and Iranian correspondent for The New York Times

== G ==
- Zarah Ghahramani (born 1981), Iranian-born Australian memoirist, author of My Life as a Traitor
- Shusha Guppy (1935–2008), singer, memoirist, writer, critic, journal editor; she lived in London

== H ==
- Fattaneh Haj Seyed Javadi (born 1945), best selling novelist
- Roya Hakakian (born 1966), Iranian-American poet, journalist, memoirist, essayist, television producer
- Maryam Heydarzadeh (born 1977), poet, lyricist
- Maryam Hooleh (born 1978), poet, novelist, filmmaker
- Ava Homa, Iranian Kurdish writer, journalist, and educator

== J ==
- Rosa Jamali (born 1977), poet, playwright, translator

== K ==
- Sheema Kalbasi (born 1972), widely translated poet, human rights activist, living in the United States
- Mehrangiz Kar (born 1944), women's rights activist, essayist, author of Crossing the Red Line
- Persis Karim (born 1962), literature scholar, author, and professor; director of the Center for Iranian Diaspora Studies at San Francisco State University; lives in the San Francisco Bay Area.
- Leila Kasra (1939–1989), poet, lyricist
- Fatemeh Keshavarz (born 1952), poet, educator, literary historian, living in the United States
- Porochista Khakpour (born 1978), Iranian-American novelist, essayist

== L ==
- Shahla Lahiji (1942–2024), feminist, translator, publisher

== M ==
- Mahsati (c.1089–c.1159), early Persian poet writing in quatrains
- Marsha Mehran (1977–2014), widely translated novelist, author of Pomegranate Soup; she lived in Argentina, the United States, Australia and Ireland.
- Mozhgan Babamarandi is an eminent Iranian writer best known for children and young adult fiction, since 1996
- Farzaneh Milani, Iranian-American educator, since early 1990s: non-fiction writer, poet
- Azadeh Moaveni (born 1976), Iranian-American journalist, memoirist, author of Lipstick Jihad, now living in London
- Roza Montazemi (c.1921–2009), popular cookbook writer
- Minoo Moshiri, essayist, translator and journalist
- Granaz Moussavi (born 1976), Iranian-Australian poet, screenwriter, film director

== N ==
- Azar Nafisi (born 1955), feminist, memoirist, literary critic, author of Reading Lolita in Tehran
- Afsaneh Najmabadi (born 1946), Iranian-American historian, educator, literary historian, author of The Story of the Daughters of Quchan
- Marina Nemat (born 1965), memoirist

== O ==
- Ghazal Omid, memoirist, author of A True Odyssey of a Woman's Struggle in Islamic Iran Against Personal and Political Forces (2005)

== P ==
- Shahrnush Parsipur (born 1946), novelist, short story writer, children's writer, translator
- Zoya Pirzad (born 1952), Iranian-Armenian novelist, works translated into several languages

== R ==
- SA Reyhani (born 1976), journalist, children's writer

== S ==
- Leila Sadeghi (born 1977), writer
- Sepideh Shamlou (born 1968), writer
- Shadi Sadr (born 1974), lawyer, journalist, women's rights activist
- Nazi Safavi (born 1967), novelist, author of Hallway to Paradise
- Tahereh Saffarzadeh (1936–2008), poet, non-fiction writer, translator, educator
- Parinoush Saniee, since 2003, novelist, author of the widely translated The Book of Fate
- Homa Sarshar, Iranian-American author, activist, feminist and journalist
- Marjane Satrapi (1969–2026), Iranian-born French novelist, illustrator, children's writer
- Louisa Shafia, Iranian-American chef and cookbook writer
- Mahasti Shahrokhi (born 1956), novelist, poet
- Siba Shakib, novelist, filmmaker, author of the widely translated Afghanistan, Where God Only Comes to Weep (2002)
- Shahla Sherkat (born 1956), journalist, feminist writer, journal publisher
- Zandokht Shirazi (1900–1953), feminist, poet, educator
- Nasrin Sameni (Born 1958), Novelist with over 70 books published

== T ==
- Táhirih, pseudonym of Fatimah Baraghani (c.1814–1852), poet, theologian
- Goli Taraghi (born 1939), novelist, short story writer
- Niloufar Talebi, memoirist, nonfiction writer, literary translator, multidisciplinary artist

== V ==
- Fariba Vafi (born 1963), novelist
- Lobat Vala (born 1930), poet, feminist, now living in London

== Y ==
- Chista Yasrebi (born 1968), writer, literary critic, translator, publisher
- Elham Yaghoubian, since the 1990s: novelist, living in the United States

== See also ==
- List of women writers
