= List of Iranian writers =

Following is a list of Iranian writers (in alphabetical order) who are notable for their work.

== Persian literature of the 21st century ==
- Ali Abdolrezaei
- Houshang Asadi
- Esmail Khoi
- Ebrahim Nabavi
- Noureddin Zarrinkelk

== Persian literature of the 20th century ==
- Ali Abdolrezaei
- Ali Mohammad Afghani
- Jalal Al-e-Ahmad
- Bozorg Alavi
- Ghazaleh Alizadeh
- Mahshid Amirshahi
- Mina Assadi
- Mansoor Yaghoti
- Manouchehr Atashi
- Reza Baraheni
- Sadegh Choubak
- Simin Daneshvar
- Ali-Ashraf Darvishian
- Levon Davidian
- Mahmoud DowlatAbadi
- Karim Emami
- Ebrahim Golestan
- Houshang Golshiri
- Sadegh Hedayat
- Mohammad Ali Jamalzadeh
- Reza Khoshnazar
- Ahmad Mahmoud
- Shahriyar Mandanipour
- Jamal Mirsadeghi
- Jaafar Modarres-Sadeghi
- Javad Mojabi
- Mohammad Mokhtari
- Aziz Motazedi
- Majid Naini
- Javad Nurbakhsh
- Shahrnush Parsipur
- Zoya Pirzad
- Hossein Rajabian
- Gholam-Hossein Saedi
- Parinoush Saniee
- Ghadam-Ali Sarami
- Abbas Shafiee
- Reza Shirmarz

== Writers outside Iran ==
- Ali Abdolrezaei
- Mahshid Amirshahi
- Mahyar Amouzegar
- Daryoush Ashouri
- Shokoofeh Azar
- Roja Chamankar
- Hamid Dabashi
- Annahid Dashtgard
- Sahar Delijani
- Reza Ghassemi
- Shusha Guppy
- Roya Hakakian
- Ava Homa
- Alireza Jafarzadeh
- Amir H. Ladan
- Abbas Marufi
- Abbas Milani
- Melody Moezzi
- Aziz Motazedi
- Azar Nafisi
- Khosro Naghed
- Shahrnush Parsipur
- Hamid Sadr
- Alexios Schandermani
- Mahbod Seraji
- Reza Shirmarz
- Niloufar Talebi
- Sholeh Wolpé
- Elham Yaghoubian
- Mehri Yalfani

== Contemporary writers ==
- Ali Abdolrezaei
- Colet Abedi
- Ahmad Akbarpour
- Yousef Alikhani
- Reza Amirkhani
- Sahar Delijani
- Ahmad Beiranvand
- Mohammad Hanif
- Peyman Hooshmandzadeh
- Arash Hejazi
- Mostafa Mastoor
- Sadegh Karamyar
- Hamid Rashidi
- Nazi Safavi
- Yashar Samimi Mofakham
- Hossein Sanapour
- Sepideh Shamlou

== See also ==
- List of Iranian women writers
- List of Persian-language poets and authors
