= The Book of Tehran =

2019 anthology of stories about Shanghai

The Book of Tehran is an anthology of nine stories from various Iranian writers, edited by Fereshteh Ahmadi and published on 27 March 2019. It is the tenth book of the Reading the City series, focused on stories from and about a certain city, in this case Tehran in Iran.

== Content ==
- Introduction by Orkideh Behrouzan
- Wake It Up by Payam Nasser, translated by Sara Khalili
- The Other Side of the Wall by Goli Taraghi, translated by Sholeh Wolpé
- Mohsen Hale-Tenor by Mohammad Tolouei, translated by Farzaneh Doosti
- In the Light Being Cast from the Kitchen by Hamed Habibi, translated by Shahab Vaezzadeh
- Sunshine by Kourosh Asadi, translated by Lida Nosrati
- Domestic Monsters by Fereshteh Ahmadi, translated by Caroline Croskery
- Circling that Heavily-Burdened Tale by Mohammad Hosseini, translated by Alireza Abiz Vii
- The Neighbor by Amirhossein Khorshidfar, translated by Poupeh Missaghi
- The Last Night by Atoosa Afshin Navid, translated by Susan Niazi
- About the authors
- About the translators

== Reviews ==
Kathryn Tann wrote for The Manchester Review, that "it would be easy to expect these stories to be filled with tumultuous history and politics of the place, but in fact, it is full of people. Complicated, emotional, often familiar people". Rosie Milne wrote for Asian Review of Books that "fiction exploring the interior life of contemporary Iranians is not well represented in translations readily available in the West. The Book of Tehran aims to begin to redress the shortage."
