= Hooshang Golshiri Literary Awards =

Non-governmental Iranian literary award

The Hooshang Golshiri Literary Award (Persian: جایزه ادبی هوشنگ گلشیری) is an Iranian literary award notable for being one of the few literary awards in Iran that is run by a non-governmental organization. Established in 2000, the award is sponsored by the non-profit Golshiri Foundation. The award focuses on modern contemporary Iranian literature. It is named in honor of Hooshang Golshiri, one of the most distinguished pioneers of Iranian modern fiction, who died in 2000. The first award was given in 2001 (1380 Solar Hijri calendar).

== Categories ==
The award is presented in four categories: Best Novel, Best Short Story Collection, Best First Novel, Best First Short Story Collection. Recipients receive 10 million Rials for Best Novel and Best Short Story Collection, 2 million Rials for the Best First Novel, and 5 million Rials for Best First Short Story Collection.

Eligible works are novels and collections of short stories published in Persian in Iran for the first time in that particular year. Iranian authors living outside the country but who publish in Iran are eligible.

== Winners ==
- 2001 (1380)
  - Best Novel: Ahmad Mahmoud, The Fig Tree of the Temples
  - Best First Novel: Sepideh Shamlou, As if You Had Said Leyli
  - Best Short Story Collection: Ali Khodaei, Keep Me Warm All the Winter Long
  - Best First Short Story Collection: Mohammad Asef Soltanzadeh, We Fade in Flight
- 2002 (1381)
  - Best Novel: Zoya Pirzad, I will Turn off the Lights
  - Best First Novel: Reza Ghassemi, The Nocturnal Harmony
  - Best Short Story Collection: Mohammad Rahim Okhovat, Our Wandering Half
  - Best First Short Story Collection: Marjan Shir-Mohammadi, After That Night
- 2003 (1382)
  - Best Novel: Fariba Vafi, My Bird
  - Best First Novel: none
  - Best Short Story Collection: Shiva Arastouei, Sunlight, Moonlight
  - Best First Story Collection: Soheila Baski, Little Shred and Bahram Moradi, Laughter in the House of Loneliness
- 2004 (1383)
  - Best Novel: Aboutorab Khosravi, Rood-e-Raavi
  - Best First Novel: Rouhangiz Sharifian, Who Believes, Rustam
  - Best Short Story Collection: Kourosh Asadi, National Park
  - Best First Short Story Collection: Moniraldin Beirouti, Single Clay and Ibrahim Damshenas, Nahast
- 2005 (1384)
  - Best Novel: Mohammad Hosseini, Bluer than Sin and Yaghoub Yadail, Rituals of Restlessness
  - Best First Novel: Soudabeh Ashrafi, Fish Sleep at Night and Farhad Bordbar, The Hue of Crow
  - Best Short Story Collection: Mohammad-Hossein Mohammadi, Red Figs of Mazar
  - Best First Short Story Collection: Mahsa Moheb’ali, Love-making in Footnotes
- 2006 (1385)
  - Best Novel: Moniraldin Beiruti, Four Pangs and Fariba Vafi, The Dream of Tibet
  - Best First Novel: Mehdi Raeisol Mohadesin, The Palmist
  - Best Short Story Collection: Hossein Sanapour, The Dark Side of Words
  - Best First Short Story Collection: Hamidreza Najafi, Gravel Gardens
- 2007 (1386)
  - Best Novel: Asghar Elahi, Salmargi
  - Best First Novel: Hossein Mortezaeian Abkenar, Scorpion on Andimeshk Railway Stairs
  - Best Short Story Collection: Mohammad Asef Soltanzadeh, Asgar Goriz
  - Best First Short Story Collection: Amirhossein Khorshidfar, Life Goes on According to Your Will
- 2008 (1387)
  - The nominees were announced but no winners.
- 2009 (1388)
  - Best Short Story Collection: Hamed Habibi, Where Flat Tire Repairing is Done and Peyman Esmaeili, Snow and the Cloudy Symphony
  - Best First Short Story Collection: Hamed Esmaeilion, Thyme is not Fair and Pedram Rezaeizadeh, The Game of Death
- 2010 (1389)
  - Best Novel: Mahsa Moheb’ali, Don't Worry
  - Best First Novel: Sara Salar, Probably I'm Lost
- 2011 (1390)
  - Best Novel: none
  - Best First Novel: Jairan Gahan, Under the Lazy Afternoon Sun
  - Best Short Story Collection: Ahmad Gholami, Humans and AbouTorab Khosravi, Desolate Book
  - Best First Short Story Collection: Amirhossein Yazdanbod, The Portrait of an Incomplete Man and Neda Kavousifar, Sleeping with Eyes Wide
- 2012 (1391)
  - Best First Short Story Collection: Mohammad Tolouei, I'm Not Janette (2011) and Spideh Siavashi, Laugh in Persian
  - Best First Novel: Salman Amin, Qal'eh-Morqi: Pyramid Period and Reza Zangi Abadi, Partridge Hunting
  - Lifetime Literary Award: Mahmoud Dowlatabadi
- 2013 (1392)
  - Best First Novel: Salman Amin, Ghale Morghi: Rouzegare Herami
  - Best First Story Collection: Sepideh Siavashi, Laugh in Farsi and Mohammad Tolouei, I’m Not Janette
- 2014 (1393)
  - Best Novel: Hamed Esmaeilion, Dr. Datis
  - Best Short Story Collection: Mohsen Abbasi, In Twilight and Ali Changizi, Oblique Pines
- 2015 (1394)
