= Hamed Habibi =

Iranian writer and poet

Hamed Habibi حامد حبیبی
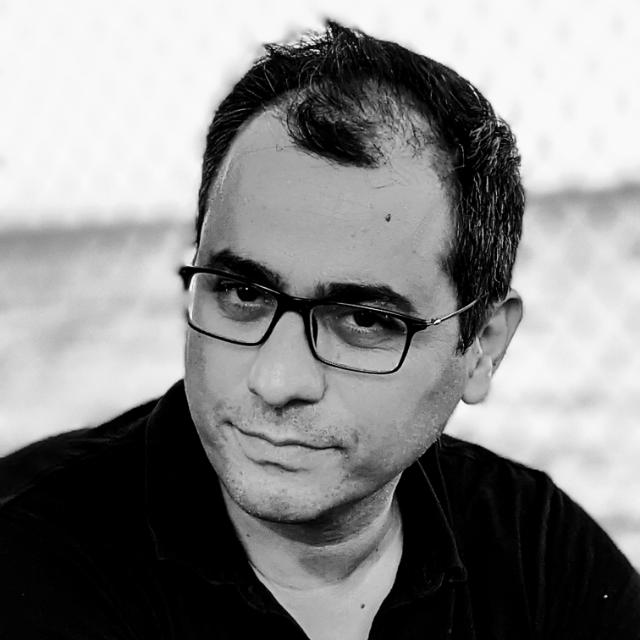
- Born: 1979 (age 46–47); Tehran, Iran
- Occupations: Writer, Poet

Hamed Habibi (Persian: حامد حبیبی; born 1978) is an Iranian poet and writer.

== Published works ==
=== Short stories ===
- The Moon and Cooper (Persian: ماه و مس), 2005, Nashr-e-Markaz, ISBN 978-964-305-854-8
- Where Flat Tire Repairing is Done (Persian: آنجا که پنچرگیری‌ها تمام می‌شوند), 2008, Entesharat-e-Qoqnoos, ISBN 978-964-311-757-3
- The Buddha of Gerdbad Restaurant (Persian: بودای رستوران گردباد), 2011, Nashr-e-Cheshmeh, ISBN 978-600-229-102-8
- Fish's Eyelid (Persian: پلک ماهی), 2016, Nashr-e-Cheshmeh

=== Poems ===
- Wandering (Persian: پرسه), 2005, Nashr-e-Sales, ISBN 978-964-380-106-9
- An Adjusted Death (Persian: مرگی به اندازه), 2014, Nashr-e-Morvarid, ISBN 978-964-191-319-1

=== Novels ===
- km 11 Old Route from Urmia to Salmas * (Persian: کیلومتر ۱۱ جاده قدیم ارومیه به سلماس) , 2017, Nashr-e-heshmeh, ISBN 978-600-229-753-2

=== Young adult's and children literature ===
- Don't wanna grow tall (Persian: نمی‌خوام قد دراز شم), 2006, Entesharat-e-Elmi-va-Farhangi, ISBN 978-964-445-758-6
- The horn that got Croup (Persian: بوقی که خروسک گرفته بود), 2008, Entesharat-e-Elmi-va-Farhangi, ISBN 978-964-445-913-9
- The worm who wanted to be a photographer (Persian: کرمی که می‌خواست عکاس شود), 2008, Entesharat-e-Elmi-va-Farhangi, ISBN 978-964-445-928-3
- The thousand and second night (Persian: شب هزار و دوم)2013, Co-writer: Mehdi Fatehi(writer), Entesharat-e-Chekkeh, ISBN 978-600-6499-00-0

== Awards ==
The Buddha of Gerdbad Restaurant was selected as the best short story collection of the year 2011 by Haft Eghlim Literary Awards. Habibi's Where Flat Tire Repairing is Done and Peyman Ecsmaeili's Snow and the Cloudy Symphony were the chosen short story collections of Hooshang Golshiri Literary Awards in 2009. In 2005,The Moon and Cooper won the special prize of Isfahan Literary Awards. Hamed Habibi and Mehdi Fatehi won the silver medal at The Flying Turtle Awards 3d Annual for The thousand and second night.
