= Fereshteh Ahmadi =

Iranian novelist

- Born: 2 September 1972 (age 54); Kerman, Iran
- Occupation: Writer
- Spouse: Amir Massoud Sajjadi
- Children: 1
- Writing career
- Notable works: The Fairy of Forgetfulness; Cheese Forest
- Movement: Persian literature

Fereshteh Ahmadi (Persian: فرشته احمدی; born 1972) is an Iranian novelist, short story writer, literary critic and editor.

== Life ==
Born in 1972, Fereshteh Ahmadi is a graduate of architecture from The University of Tehran. She began her writing career in the late 1990s as a journalist, writing reports, reviews and weekly columns for a few dailies and literary magazines. Her first published book, Nameless (Bi Esm) is a story for young children. Ahmadi's first collection of short stories, Everyone's Sarah (Sara ye Hameh), was published in 2004. Television, a short story in this collection was selected by Hooshang Golshiri Foundation as one of the best short stories of the year. Her first and second novels, Fairy of Forgetfulness (Pari ye Faramooshi) and Cheese Forest (Jangal e Panir), were published in 2009. Hyperthermia (Garmazadegi), Ahmadi's second collection, was published in 2013.

Fereshteh Ahmadi has published three collections of short stories and two novels. Her latest book, Domestic Monsters (Hayoolaha ye Khanegi), is a collection of eight short stories, published in 2016. She is an editor for a few publishing houses and a member of award juries in several national literary events.

== Selected works ==
=== Short stories ===
- 2004 Everyone's Sarah (Sara ye Hameh)
- 2013 Hyperthermia (Garmazadegi)
- 2016 Domestic Monsters (Hayoolaha ye Khanegi)

=== Novels ===
- 2009 Fairy of Forgetfulness (Pari ye Faramashooi)
- 2009 Cheese Forest ( Jangal e Panir)
