= Sara Khalili =

Journalist, editor, and literary translator

Sara Khalili (Persian: سارا خلیلی) is a journalist, editor, and literary translator based in New York.

== Publications ==
Khalili's translations of contemporary Iranian literature include:

- Siavash Kasrai, As Red as Fire, Tasting of Smoke, Collected Poems of Siavash Kasrai (2007)
- Fereydoun Moshiri, Lucky Those Half-Open Buds, Collected Poems of Fereydoun Moshiri (2007)
- Shahriar Mandanipour, Censoring an Iranian Love Story (2009)
- Simin Behbahani, My Country, I Shall Build You Again, Collected Poems of Simin Behbahani (2009)
- Parinoush Saniee, The Book of Fate (2013)
- Shahrnush Parsipur, Kissing the Sword: A Prison Memoir (2013)
- Goli Taraghi, The Pomegranate Lady and Her Sons: Selected Stories (2013)
- Yaghoub Yadali, Rituals of Restlessness (2016)
- Forough Farrokhzad, The Sorrow of Solitude, Collected Poems of Forough Farrokhzad
- Shahriar Mandanipour, Moon Brow (2018)
- Hadi Mohammadi, Nooshin Safakhoo (illus.), In the Meadow of Fantasies (2021)
- Shahriar Mandanipour, Season of Purgatory ( 2022)
- Siamak Herawi, Tali Girls (2023)

Her short story translations have appeared in The Literary Review, The Kenyon Review, the Michigan Quarterly Review, the Virginia Quarterly Review, Epoch, Words Without Borders, Granta, PEN America, Witness, and Consequence.
