= Hossein Sanapour =

Iranian writer (born 1960)

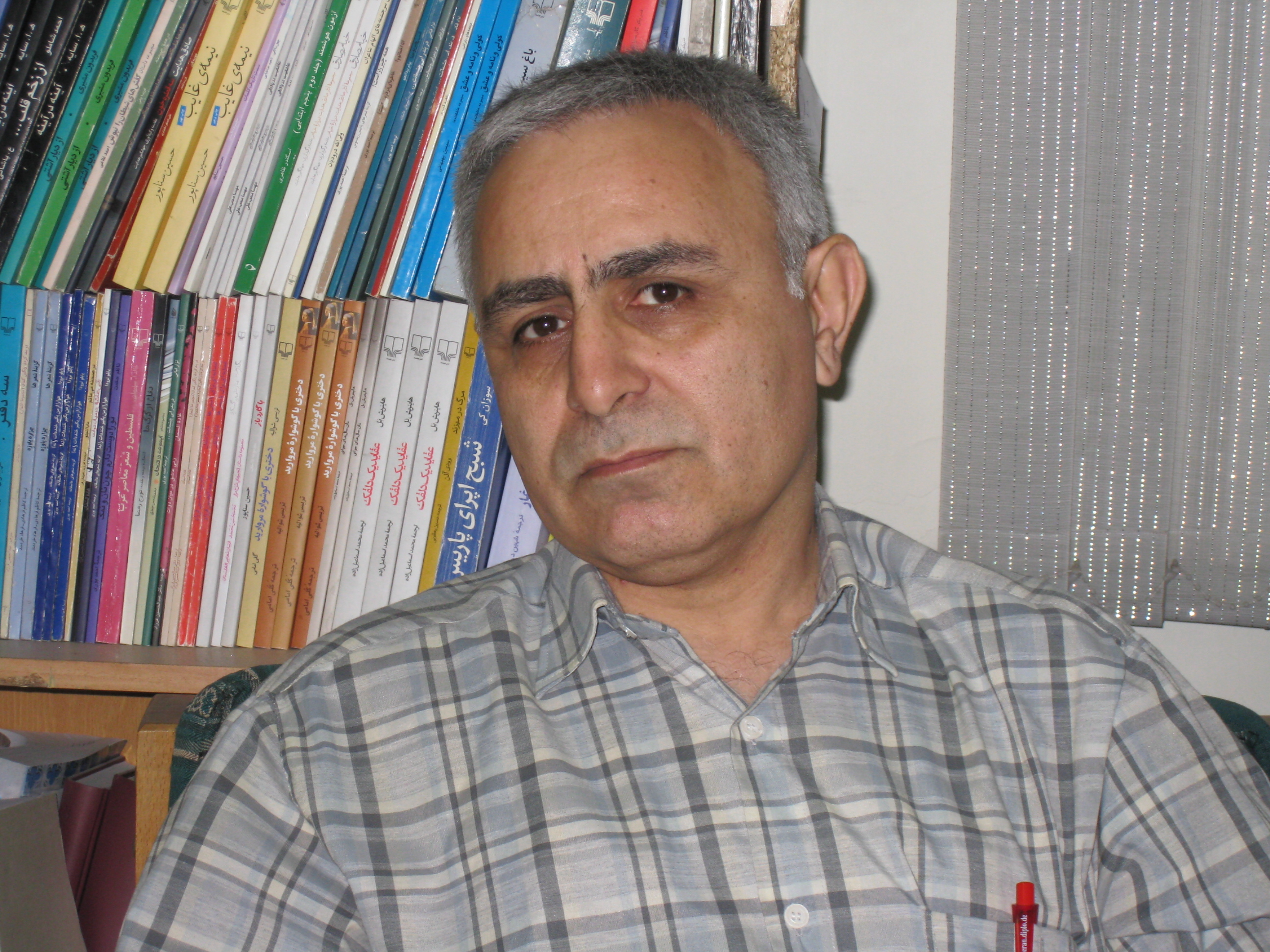
- Born: 1960 (age 65–66); Tehran, Imperial State of Iran
- Occupation: Writer

Hossein Sanapour (Persian: حسین سناپور, born 1960) is an Iranian writer.

== Biography ==
Sanapour earned a degree in natural resources and started to write from his late years in university, sometimes stories, sometimes screenplays and later literary critique and movie reviews. He had been present, since 1990, in Hooshang Golshiri's classes and then sessions, which, allegedly, were effective in his learning of writing techniques.

He has been active in journalism since 1993, writing on literature and arts and in four different newspapers. Prior to that, his articles were published in literary and cinematic publications. He has given lectures on story writing in recent years.

== Works and Publications ==
- His first book was a long novel for teenagers: The Village Boys
- Afsane and long night.
- In 1999, his novel The Absent Half was published by Cheshme publication house. ISBN 978-9-645-57103-8
- Sanapour, Hossein (2011). Ba Gard-e Baz. p. 144. ISBN 9-64-362125-1.
- You are coming ruin, was published, and was nominated for a few awards.
- Sanapour also published a collection of articles on novel writing in 2003.
- In the year 2004 he published the story collection titled With open guard
- In 2005, Dark side of words was published, also by Cheshme publication house. ISBN 9-643-62247-9
- He wrote a story called "Lips on a Blade" that was barred from publication by the government for nearly two years.
- Edge to Edge Persian Edition
- He also compiled a book on Golshiri titled Hamkhanie Kateban.
- A Home Must Be a Home (Co-authored), 2013
- Gholamreza, Emrani (2018). Farhang, Omrani (ed.). Perceived Differently. p. 588. ISBN 978-6-009-09902-3.

== Awards and nominations ==
- Dark side of open words won the 2006 Hooshang Golshiri Literary Award for Best Short Story Collection.
- With open guard was also nominated for several awards, but didn't win any of them.
- Mehregan Award (by Peka Institute) and then co-awarded the Yalda Award for his novel The Absent Half

== External references ==
- The Absent Half novel preview
- Interview with The Parsagon Review
- Hossein Sanapour: A brief history of Iran's modern literature- British Council
- List of Hossein Sanapour's publication/books
- Hossein Sanapour at the 7th Hooshang Golshiri Literary Awards Ceremony
