= Hossein Mortezaeian Abkenar =

Iranian writer and screenwriter (born 1967)

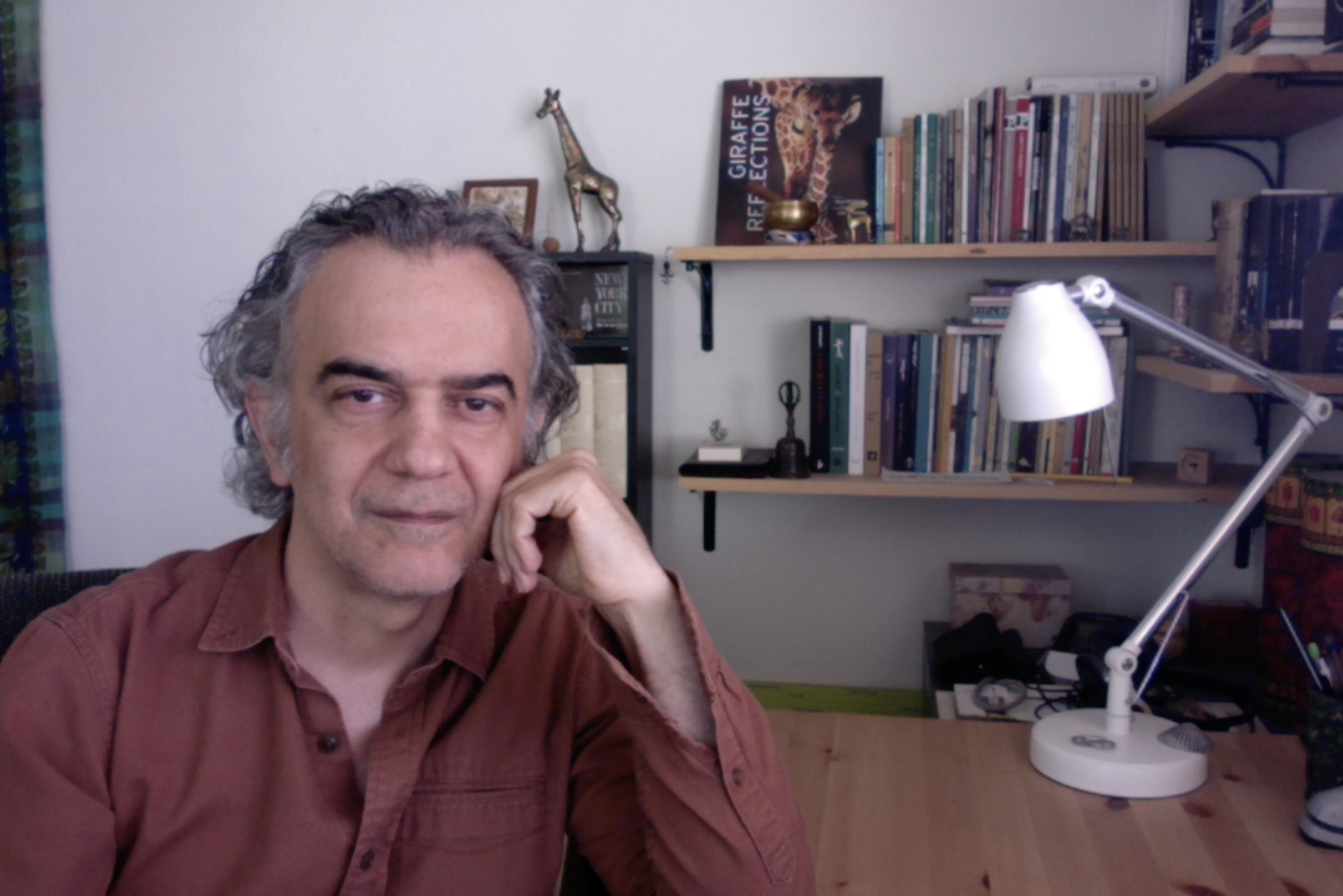
- Born: Persian: حسین مرتضاییان آبکنار; 24 February 1967 (age 59); Tehran, Imperial State of Iran
- Education: University of Tehran
- Occupation: Writer
- Writing career
- Notable work: A Scorpion on the Steps of Andimeshk Railroad Station
- Notable awards: Hooshang Golshiri Award
- Website: hosseinabkenar.com

Hossein Mortezaeian Abkenar (Persian: حسین مرتضاییان آبکنار; born 1967) is an Iranian writer and screenwriter.

== Life ==
Abkenar was born in Tehran. Abkenar received a Bachelor of Arts in performing arts from University of Tehran. During the Iran–Iraq War, he did his military service near border where affected his novel's atmosphere.

He co-authored the screenplay for the film No One Knows about Persian Cats, directed by Bahman Ghobadi and awarded the Special Jury Prize in the Un Certain Regard section at the 2009 Cannes Film Festival. Abkenar's books are banned from sale and publication in Iran.

== Awards ==
His first novel, Scorpion on the Steps of Andimeshk Train Station, or Blood's Dripping From This Train, received the 2007 Hooshang Golshiri Literary Award for "Best First Novel", and the Mehregan Award for the best novel of the year, as well as the Vaav Award for the year's most unique novel.

In September 2014, he was granted a fellowship by Black Mountain Institute at the University of Nevada, Las Vegas where each fellow in the nine-month writing program.

== Works ==
=== Books ===
- The Concert of Forbidden Tars
- The French Perfume
- Scorpion on the Steps of Andimeshk Train Station, or Blood's Dripping From This Train
- Darkness, 2020

=== Screenplay ===
- No One Knows About Persian Cats
- Mandoo
