= Mozhgan Babamarandi =

Mozhgan Babamarandi (Persian: مژگان بابامرندی; born in Tehran, Iran), is an Iranian writer best known for children and young adult fiction.

She began her writing career in 1995. Her writing focuses on moral and social issues in Iran among children and adolescents. She bases her stories on her own childhood experiences. She prefers the short-story format, which is the most common format in which her works are published.

Babamarandi has received multiple nominations and won several national awards, including first Literary festival "Kam e Yusef" for her book: Only Daddy Can Wake Me Up. Her first novel Statue was published in Keyhan Bacheha, a children's magazine in 1996. One year later, in 1997, her second story: A Gift for Narges, was published by the Office of Islamic Culture Publications.

== Education ==
Mozhgan Babamarandi graduated with a bachelor's degree in Persian Literature and Master's in Dramatic Literature.

== Awards ==
- Institute for the Intellectual Development of Children and Young Adults in Tehran Province, Storytelling Festival Winner, 1998
- First Prize in Stage Design at the Institute for the Intellectual Development of Children and Young Adults' First Puppet Show Festival in the country, 1999, for the play Aunt Cockroach.
- Tehran Province's Top Trainer Institute for the Intellectual Development of Children and Young Adults, 1999
- In 2001, she was named the country's top trainer institute for the intellectual development of children and young adults.
- "Hi Grandpa ", winning first rank in Press Festival (in novel fiction), 2001
- First Prize in Directing at the Institute for the Intellectual Development of Children and Young Adults 4th Puppet Show Festival in Tehran Province, 2002, for the play The Man Had No Lips.
- "I have Missed Sunshine ", winning Tehran Selected Screenplay, 2003
- Winning the Eighth rank of National 88 Words Internet Stories, 2008
- "The Good Ashura Day" Play, selected as the best story of the province (Tehran), 2008
- "Hi Grandpa ", Winning the "Hi Kids Festival; Salam Bacheha " award, 2009
- "I Will Become a Spiderman Like Rostam", winning the Sixteenth Festival of Iranian Institute for the Intellectual Development of Children and Young Adults, 2013
- " Old Aunt Liked to Tell Story ", winning the competition of Cultural-Scientific Publications, 2014
- "May God Turn the Steering Wheel" (the command), nominated for Press Book's Festival, 2016

== Published books ==
Since 1996, She has written more than 20 story books for Children and Young Adults, which all of them have been published.

Some of them are as follows:

- Statue, Keiyan Bacheha-Iran, 1996
- A Gift For Narges, The Office of Islamic Culture Publications-Iran,1997
- All Stars For You, Madineh Publications-Iran, 2001
- The Golden Fountain pen, Madreseh Publications-Iran, 2001
- Hi Grandpa, Madreseh Publications-Iran, 2008
- My First Word Was Butterfly, Soroush Publications-Iran, 2008
- Even Men Sometimes Cry, Madreseh Publications-Iran, 2008
- Sunshine Crossed Moonlight and Me, Amir Kabir Publications-Iran, 2009
- What Is The Taste Of Secret ?, Cultural-Scientific Publications-Iran, 2009
- Shy Guest, Cultural-Scientific Publications-Iran, 2009
- Only Daddy Can Wake me Up, Iranian Institute for the Intellectual Development of Children and Young Adults, 2009
- Every Year Before The First Bell, Beh Nashr Publications-Iran, 2010
- Let's Paint The Sky, Madreseh Publications-Iran, 2010
- Mozhgan, Babamarandi (2011). Lady Poetess and Mr. Beethoven. POL Literary & Translation Agency. p. 112. ISBN 978-9-643-49721-7.
- Madam Poetess And Mr. Beethoven, Beh Nashr Publications-Iran, 2011
- My Amerindian Name, Soroush Publications-Iran, 2012
- Why Sun Was Crying?, Amir Kabir Publications-Iran, 2012
- Seven Stairs, Soroush Publications-Iran, 2012
- I Will Become A Spiderman Like Rostam, Iranian Institute for the Intellectual Development of Children and Young Adults, 2012
- I Wish There Was Violet Beneath Every Snow, Soroush Publications-Iran, 2015
- The Story Of Current Condition And The Wishes Of A Donkey, Peidayesh Publications-Iran, 2015
- The Tickle's Cocoon Was Close To Grandma, Amir Kabir Publications-Iran, 2016
- The Colour Of Daddy's Laugh, Monadiye Tarbiat Publications-Iran, 2017
- The Yard Was Full Of Bird And Song, Monadiye Tarbiat Publications-Iran, 2017
- In The Name Of God, Raise the Papers, Monadiye Tarbiat Publications-Iran, 2017
- Mozhgan, Babamarandi (2018). I was my Grandma’s Mom (PDF). p. 72. ISBN 978-9-643-49721-7.
- Mozhgan, Babamarandi (2018). The News Presenter was Silent. POL Literary & Translation Agency. p. 126. ISBN 978-9-643-34639-3.
