= Parinoush Saniee =

Iranian novelist and writer

- Persian: پرینوش صنیعی
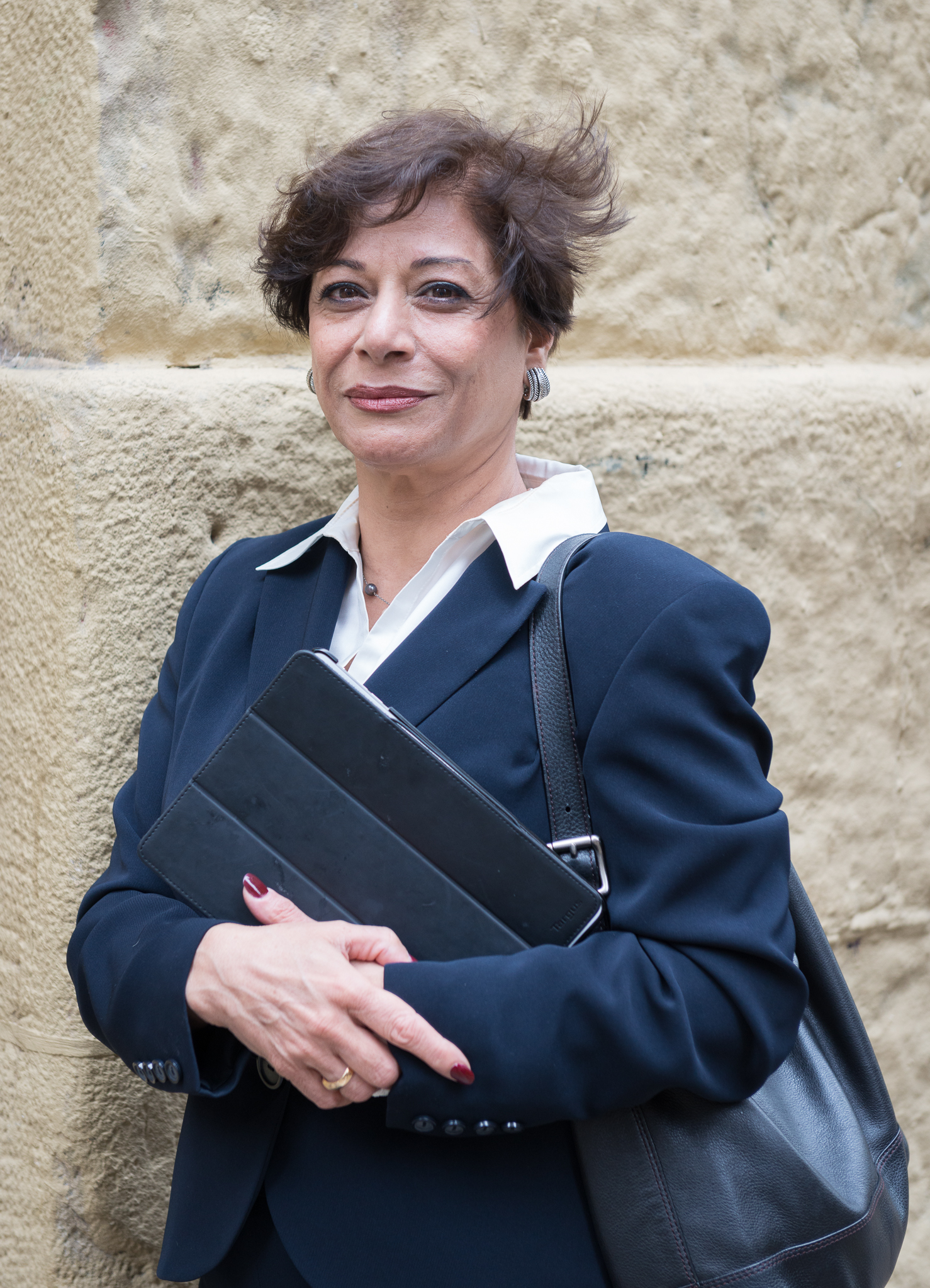
- Parinoush Saniee, in Literaktum, San Sebastian (2015).
- Education: Psychology
- Alma mater: Tehran University
- Occupation: Government researcher
- Writing career
- Language: Persian
- Period: 21st century
- Notable works: My Share (2003); English translation as The Book of Fate (2013)
- Website: Profile on agency website

Parinoush Saniee (Persian: پرینوش صنیعی,) is an Iranian novelist. Her novel The Book of Fate has been translated into 26 languages and the English translation by Sara Khalili was listed by World Literature Today as one of the "75 notable translations of 2013". The Italian edition earned Saniee the 2010 Boccaccio Prize.

== Works ==
Saniee's works include:

- Sahm-e man ("My Share", 2003)
  - Italian translation by N. G. Monsef and Sepideh Rouhi, Quello che mi spetta (2010)
  - English translation by Sara Khalili, The Book of Fate (2013)
  - German translation by Bettina Friedrich, Was mir zusteht (2013)
  - Japanese translation by Syoichi Nasu, Shiawase no Zanzou (2013)
  - Norwegian translation by Nina Zandjani, Det som ventet meg (2013)
  - Korean translation by Heo Jieun, Naui Mok (2013)
  - Spanish translation by Gemma Rovira Ortega, El libro de mi destino (2014)
  - Bulgarian translation by Lyudmila Yaneva, Моята орис (2014)
  - Finnish translation by Anna Lönnroth, Kohtalon kirja (2014)
  - French translation by Odile Demange, Le Voile de Téhéran (2015)
  - Romanian translation by Cerasela Barbone, Cel care mă așteaptă (2015)
  - Azerbaijani translation by Masuma Shukurzadeh, Mənim Payım (2016)
  - Swedish translation by Namdar Nasser, Det som väntar mig (2020)
- Pedar-e aan digari ("Father of the Other One")
  - Norwegian translation by Nina Zandjani, Den stumme gutten (2014)
  - Bulgarian translation by Lyudmila Yaneva, Бащата на другия (2015)
  - Romanian translation by Cristina Ciovarnache, Tatal celuilalt copil (2013)
  - Spanish translation by Carlos Mayor, Una voz escondida (2016)
- Range-e Hambastegee
- Anhaa ke Raftand va Anha ke Mandand
  - Bulgarian translation by Lyudmila Yaneva, Тези, които останаха и онези, които заминаха (2025)

== See also ==
- List of Iranian women writers
