= Aziz Motazedi =

Iranian novelist and essayist

Aziz Motazedi (Persian: عزیز معتضدی, born August 10, 1950, in Tehran, Iran) is an Iranian novelist and essayist. He has lived in Montreal, Quebec, Canada, since 1995. Motazedi has also written critical articles on politics and the literary and intellectual discourses of his original country and elsewhere. His novel Scheherazade was subject to an official ban with a possibility to be published after heavy censorship by the Ministry of Culture and Islamic Guidance, but was finally published, in full, with several years delay in Toronto, Ontario, Canada.

== See also ==
- Censorship in Iran
