= Lipstick Jihad =

2005 book by Azadeh Moaveni

Lipstick Jihad: A Memoir of Growing Up Iranian in America and American in Iran
- Author: Azadeh Moaveni
- Language: English
- Subject: Iranian American women
- Genre: Biography
- Publisher: Public Affairs
- Publication date: 2005
- Publication place: United States
- Pages: 249
- ISBN: 1-58648-193-2
- OCLC: 56617255
- Dewey Decimal: 305.48/89155073/092 B 22
- LC Class: E184.I5 M63 2005

Lipstick Jihad: A Memoir of Growing Up Iranian in America and American in Iran (ISBN 1-58648-193-2) is Iranian-American writer Azadeh Moaveni's first book, published on February 4, 2005.

The book tells the story of the author's first-person experiences in Iran where she worked as a reporter after living in the United States her entire life. Moaveni examines Iranian youth culture, as well as concepts of gender and ethnicity among Iranian Americans influenced by both cultures. She illuminates everyday aspects of Iranian life that only an inside perspective could provide and examines the nuanced political views held by both men and women in Iran. The book is part of a growing movement of female writers within the Iranian diaspora, including such other authors as Marjane Satrapi, Firoozeh Dumas, Nahid Rachlin, and Azar Nafisi.
