= Tahereh Eybod =

Iranian author and researcher

- طاهره ایبد
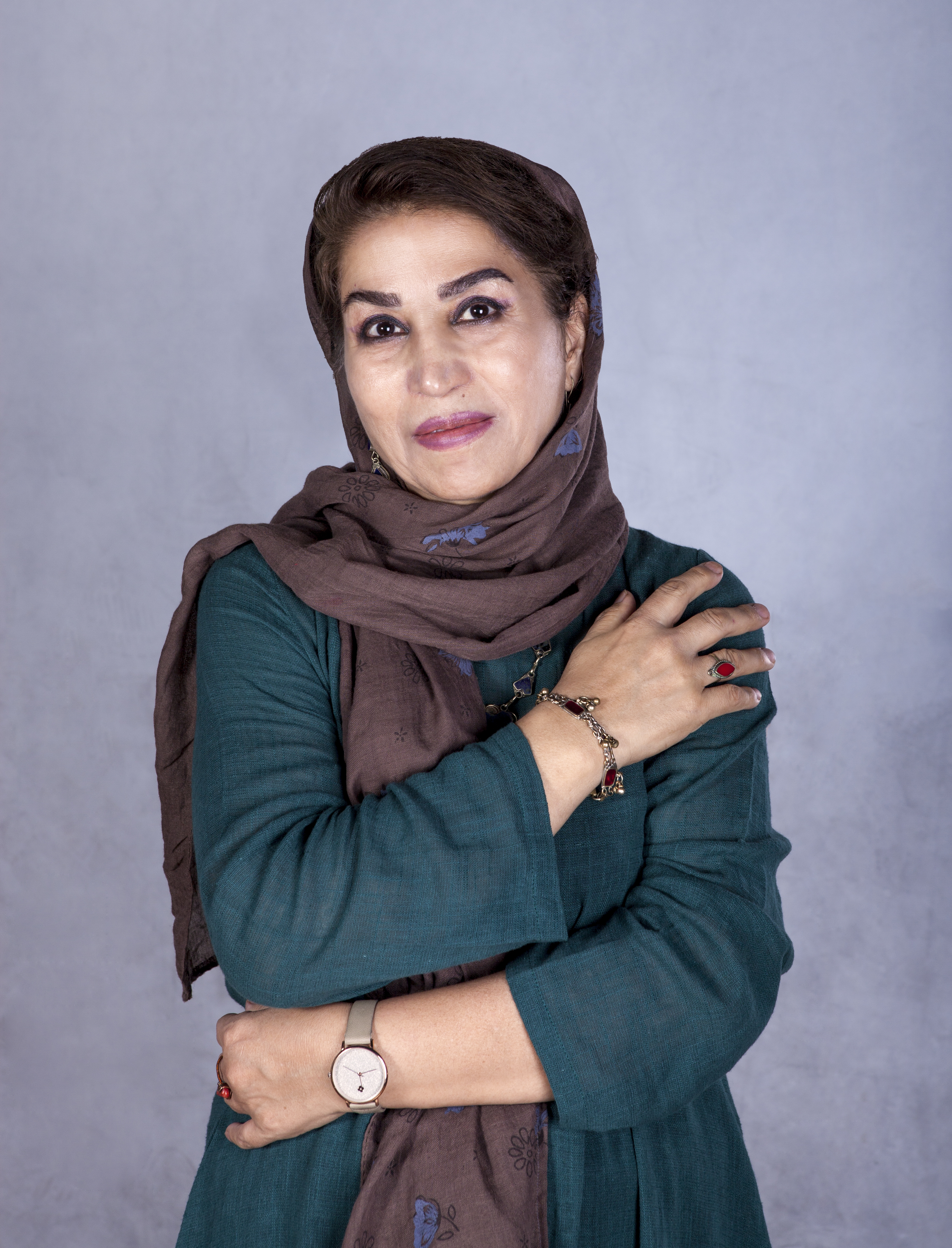
- Born: September 23, 1963 (age 62); Shiraz, Iran
- Occupations: Writer; journalist
- Known for: Writing from short stories to novels for all age groups in different genres

Tahereh Eybod (Persian: طاهره ایبد) (born 23 September 1963) is an Iranian author, researcher, critic, and journalist, known for her children's literature. Tahereh Eybod, an author of children and young adults, was born in Shiraz (Fars province). Eybod has published more than 150 books for all age groups; babies and toddlers, preschoolers, children, young adults, and adults. These works include picture books, short stories, serial stories, and novels in various genres consisting of realism, humor, horror, fantasy, magic realism, etc. Many academic theses and reviews have been written on Eybod's works, especially about features of her young adults novel Liasandmaris Fairies: 'The analysis of archetypes in literary texts is actually removing the apparent layer of each text so as to reach the deep structure and the second and invisible layer of that work. Affected by her unconsciousness, Tahereh Eybod has consciously and evidently applied the archetypical symbols in the Fairies of Liasendmaris. That is why the novel has not been artificial.

== Overview of works ==
Eybod's works contain various themes including war, peace, friendship, family, environment, life, and death, the nature of the "self" etc. Fictional works for youth adults, short stories for children, and works with a prominent humorous situation and tone, all are seen in her repertoire such as in The Family of Mr. Charkhashi book, which has been selected in the White Ravens's list of the International Youth Library in 2005, and it was awarded the Parvin Etesami Award. Her Liasandmaris Fairies novel is the native Iranian novel written in the style of magical realism: 'Some consider this novel to be the first and only fantasy novel in the field of children's and young adults literature in our country (Iran), which is in the category of magical realist stories. This novel was the specific selection of the "Shahid Shahi" Book Festival, and it also received a wooden statue of the "Charcoal Mermaid

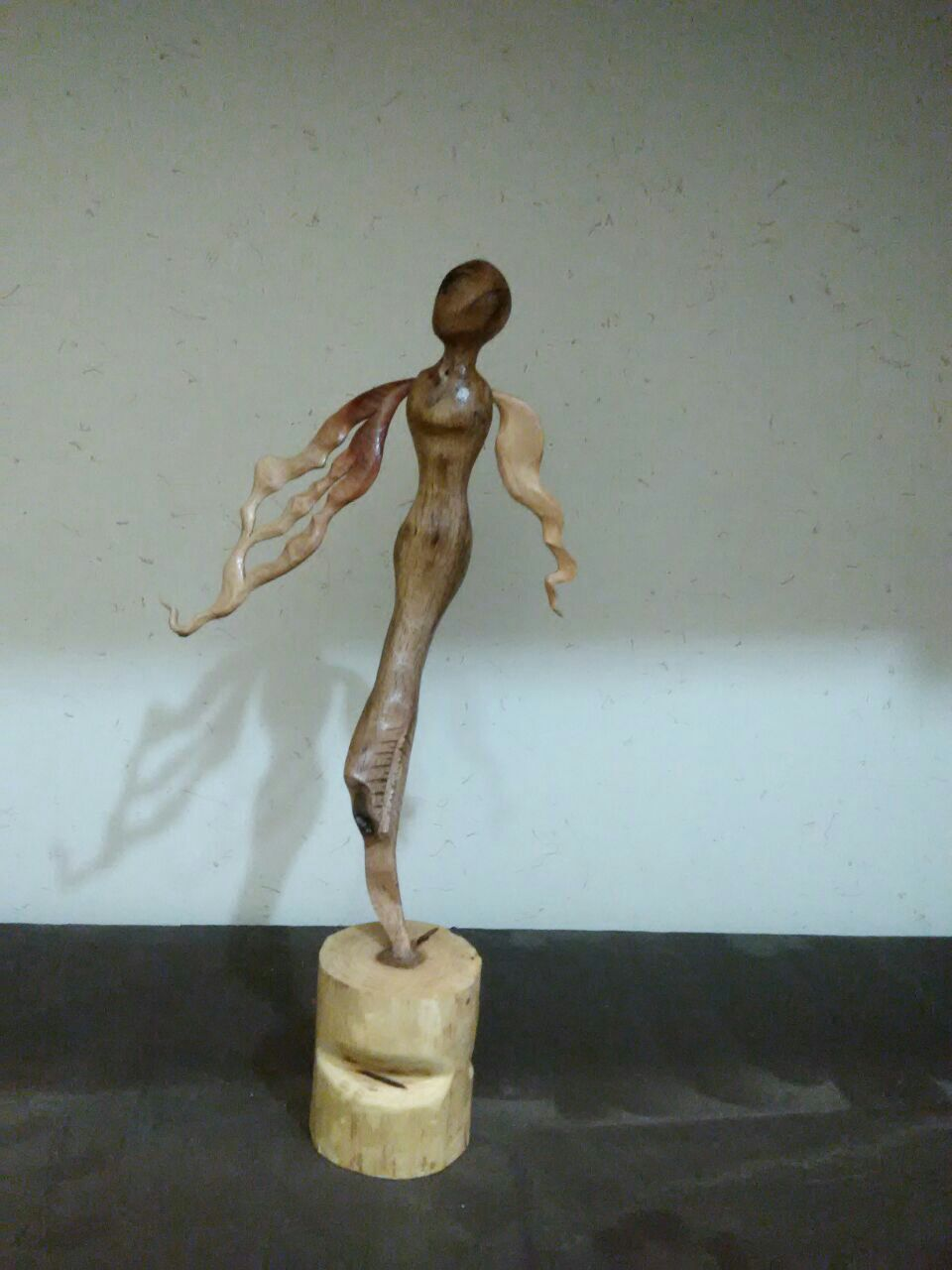
Statue of 'Charcoal Mermaid' for the novel 'Fairies of Liasandmaris'

", (one of the main characters in the novel), from the Kermanshah province Center for the Intellectual Development of Child and youth adults. The geography of this novel is the port of `Siraf`, which was the sea origin of the Silk Road. The choice of this place instead of the rest of the places in south Iran is closely related to the culture and beliefs of the people of southern Iran and the plot of the novel. Furthermore, her adult novel, Dowr Gardun, is in the same style Which has received the Book of the Year of Sustainability Literature award from the Ministry of Culture and Islamic Guidance. The themes of her works include the constant issues and concerns of human beings, social issues, discrimination, and gender stereotypes, questioning, logical thinking, critique of adult behavior towards children: '...the story of Bandenaf by Tahereh Eybod (2005) sarcastically criticize(s) the behavior of adults toward children` as well as the needs and desires of today's children and adolescents: 'Eybod should be considered a writer with different themes and themes'. Eybod seeks new experiences in form and narrative. Eybod's deconstruction of the narrative is seen in many of his works, such as "The Big Wolf and the Fat Fish" and 'The Strange and Exotics Under the Sea', as Mohammad Hadi Mohammadi says of the book: 'In this narrative, we have no character. The children are present as observers.

== From childhood to for children ==
Tahereh Eybod was born to a family with nine children, five sons, and four daughters. She was the sixth child and the youngest daughter in the family. Her father was a truck driver and unemployed most of the time. In such a situation, having a book was impossible for her. She was not allowed to go to the library and only read scrapped books and magazines that would find in the trash. She never thought about becoming a writer until twelve, but she loved listening to stories and storytelling for her little brothers. When Eybod went to the second grade of elementary school (age 8), a 200-page notebook was gifted by her teacher. Eybod dedicated it as her fiction and poetry notebook. When she lost her father at the age of 11, their living conditions became more difficult. After that, she sought more refuge in the fictional universe to cope with the harsh reality of life. At the age of 12, her English teacher held a poetry and story contest in the school, and she won the first literary award; it was for two volumes of storybooks. On that day her English teacher articulated a sentence to Eybod:'you can become a writer. When she sent an article to Courier Magazine (a magazine for students) and saw Tahereh Eybod's name in the magazine, believed her words. she was hired as an instructor at the "Institute for the Intellectual Development of Children and Young Adults” after graduating from high school (age 18). Then she and participated in Naser Irani's story writing workshop (1982), and with the publication of her first book, "Saleh", by that institute, her career began in children's and young adult literature at age 21. She moved to Tehran in 1985 after her marriage and graduated with a bachelor's degree in English language teaching.

== Selected honors and awards ==
- Broken Branch, the best work of fiction, Literature Festival of the Ministry of Culture, 1988.
- Garden in a Pot, selected work, Book Festival of the Year, Soroush for Adolescents Magazine, 1996.
- Garden in a Pot, selected work, Children's Book Council, 1996.
- Burnt Palm, selected work of the Press Festival of the Center for Intellectual Development of Children and Young Adults, 1996.
- Dowr Gardun novel, selected work, Ministry of Culture, Sustainability Literature Festival, 2000.
- Top author in the field of writing girls' issues in the great festival of Twenty Years, Twenty Authors, 2000.
- Forty Windows, the selected work of the Center for Intellectual Development of Children and Young Adults book festival of the year, selected work of the book festival of Salam Bacheha Magazine, 2000, and selected work of the First Razavi Festival, 2005.
- In the Air of the Red Rose, selected work, the book festival of Salam Bacheha Magazine, 2001.
- Mr. Charkheshi's Family, Selected for the White Ravens list by International Youth Library in Munich, Germany, 2005.
- Mr. Charkheshi's Family, selected work, Parvin Etesami Festival, 2007.
- Liasandmaris Fairies, Special Work, Adolescent Novel Section of "Shahid Shahi" Festival, 2012.
- The Black Tail-Headed Monster, the selected work of the Center for Intellectual Development of Children and Young Adults book festival of the year, 2012.
- The Black Tail-Headed Monster, selected work of the Center for Children's Literature Studies of Shiraz University Fiction Book Festival, 2016.
- Sea Clown, selected work of children and Adolescent Press Festival, 2016.
- Three Strange Travelers, the first rank of Khatam Festival of Children's Stories, 2017.
- Top Author, Celebrated for all activities and works in Boushehr Province, 2017
- Liasandmaris Fairies, Receiving the statue of "Charcoal Fairy", one of the characters of Liasand Maris fairy tales novel Novel of Adolescents in Kermanshah province, 2017.
- The Big Wolf and the Fat Fish, Admired, National Best Book Festival, 2017.
- The Jar That Was Alone, admired work, Kashan Children's Literature Festival, 2018.
- Commemoration of Tahereh Eybod by Shiraz City Council, 2019.
- Land of the Dead and the Living, selected book of the year and winner of the Golden Bird of Center for the Intellectual Development of Children and Young Adults, 2021.
- Who Had Glued the Letter to the Window?, selected book in the 20th Roshd festival, 2023.
- Wet Beez Beez, selected book in the 20th Roshd festival, 2023.

== Selected works ==
=== For babies and toddlers ===
- Game of the Moon and the Star, Tehran: Madreseh Publications, 2005.
- Cowardly Turtle, Tehran: Center for Intellectual Development of Children and Young Adults, 2010.
- Come and Sleep Baby, Tehran: Scientific and Cultural Publications, 2011.

=== For young children ===
- The Rooster Didn't Look at His Tail, Tehran: Amir Kabir, 2011.
- Baby Bear, Tehran: Amir Kabir, 2015
- Checkered and Aunt Raisin (5 volumes), Tehran: Institute for Intellectual Development of Children and Young Adults, 2015.
- Hopping Here, Hopping There, Bunch of Flower in My Hand(1st of the 7 volume collection of Iranian Nonsensical Stories), Tehran: Institute for Intellectual Development of Children and Young Adults, 2021.
- Hee Hee, Hee Hee, Which is Better, Cherry or Berry (2nd of the 7 volume collection of Iranian Nonsensical Stories, Tehran: Institute for Intellectual Development of Children and Young Adults, 2021.
- Eeny, Meeny, Miny, Moe 3rd of the 7-volume collection of Iranian Nonsensical Stories), Tehran: Institute for Intellectual Development of Children and Young Adults, 2021.
- Uncle Chain Knitter and the Pirate of the Legendary Mountain (4th of the 7-volume collection of Iranian Nonsensical Stories), Tehran: Institute for Intellectual Development of Children and Young Adults, 2021.
- Drip Drop, Pitter Patter, Raindrops(5th of the 7-volume collection of Iranian Nonsensical Stories), Tehran: Institute for Intellectual Development of Children and Young Adults, 2021.
- The Cow Shaped Non-Raining Clouds(6th of the 7-volume collection of Iranian Nonsensical Stories), Tehran: Institute for Intellectual Development of Children and Young Adults, 2021.
- Tap Tap Tubby, Where is My Dough Tub(7th of the 7-volume collection of Iranian Nonsensical Stories), Tehran: Institute for Intellectual Development of Children and Young Adults, 2021.

=== Works for kids ===
- Crazy Snowman, Tehran: Monadi Tarbiat, 2005.
- One Pair, Two Pairs, (The Collection of Short Stories in Two Volumes (100 humor stories)), Tehran: Behnashr, 2005.
- Paper Cat, Tehran: Shahr Publishing, 2007.
- A Message for the Cotton Cloud, Tehran: Scientific-Cultural Publications, 2007.
- Baby Bear Trial, Tehran: Monadi Tarbiat, 2008.
- The Fish Coughed, Tehran: Shahr Publishing, 2009.
- The Black Tail-Headed Monster, Tehran: Amir Kabir, 2011.
- The Rooster Didn't Look at His Tail, Tehran: Amir Kabir, 2011.
- Do not Let It Escape, Tehran: Nashr Shahr, 2013.
- The Trial of a Miserable Cat (two volumes), Tehran: Nashr Shahr, 2013.
- The Big Wolf and the Fat Fish, Tehran: Scientific and Cultural Publications, 2015.
- The Jar That Was Alone, Tehran: Soroush, 2015.
- Ghagha Gholi Ghoul, Ghaghouli, Tehran: Center for Intellectual Development of Children and Young Adults, 2015.
- Pepe the Reverse (children's humor and fantasy), Tehran: Amir Kabir, 2016.
- Ten Bites of a Story, The Wrong Zebra, Tehran: Amir Kabir, 2016.
- The Pink ATM, Tehran: Amir Kabir, 2016.
- The Red Wolf, Tehran: Amir Kabir, 2016.
- The Webless Spider, Tehran: Amir Kabir, 2016.
- Three Strange Travelers, Tehran: Islamic Culture Publishing Office, 2017.
- The Turtle has no Shell, Tehran: Mehrab Ghalam, 2018.
- The Strange and Exotics Under the Sea, Tehran: Center for Intellectual Development of Children and Young Adults, 2018.
- Land of the Dead and the Living, Tehran: Shahr Ghalam, 2020.
- Giant Compote, Tehran: Friday Story, 2020.
- One Beez, the Other No Beez, (Volume 1 of the Mosquitoes Beez Beez Collection), Tehran: Soureh Mehr (Mehrak), 2021.
- Wet Beez Beez, (Volume 2 of the Mosquitoes Beez Beez Collection), Tehran: Soureh Mehr (Mehrak), 2021.
- Beez Lord Mosquito, (Volume 3 of the Mosquitoes Beez Beez Collection), Tehran: Soureh Mehr (Mehrak), 2021.
- Nakhor Nakhore Bogeyman, (Horror and Humor novel), Tehran: Hoopa Publications, 2021.
- How to make rude children polite(A series of humor and fantasy stories), Tehen: Porteghaal(kheilisabz.com) publications, 2022
- Fish Skeleton,(Fantastic story) Tehran: Michka publication, 2022.
- Giant Homework(One, Two, Three Line Stories) Tehran, Talaee Publications,2023.
- Mermaid's Brunette, Tehran: Siyavoshan, 2023.

=== Novels and short stories for Adolescents ===
- Saleh, Tehran: Center for Intellectual Development of Children and Young Adults, 1985.
- Broken Glasses, Tehran: Soroush, 1989.
- Garden in a Pot, Tehran: Zolal, 1996.
- Last Letter, Tehran: Sarir, 1999.
- Forty Windows, Tehran: Peidayesh, 1999.
- In the Air of Rose, Tehran: Herald of Education, 2000.
- Alam Shangheh (Hullabaloo), Tehran: Monadi Tarbiat, 2000.
- Uncle Nowruz Retires, Tehran: Farhang Gostar, 2001.
- Poghorgati(light-headed) House (interconnected collection of humorous stories), Tehran: Center for the Intellectual Development of Children and Young Adults, 2011.
- Liasandmaris Fairies, Tehran: Center for Intellectual Development of Children and Young Adults, 2011.
- The situation is getting sloppy, Tehran, Hamshahri publisher, 2014.
- Who Had Glued the Letter to the Window?, Tehran: Center for Intellectual Development of Children and Young Adults, 2021.

=== Works for adults ===
- Dowr Gardoon novel, Tehran, Soroush Publications, 1999.
- Selected Story Collection of Contemporary Literature(9), Tehran, Neystan Publishing, 1999.
- My Month, His Moon novel, Tehran Foundation for the Preservation of His Relics and Values, Holy Defense, 2000.

== Translated works ==
- A message for the cotton cloud, (English), Tehran, Elmi, Farhangi, (پیغامی برای ابر پنبه‌ای), 2008.
- Eine Botschaft für die kleine Wolke, (Germany), Tehran, Elmi, Farhangi, (پیغامی برای ابر پنبه‌ای), 2010.
- The Black Tail-Headed Monster (English), 2011. (دیو سیاه دم به سر)
- Piccia Mia Vieni a nana, (Italian), Scientific and Cultural Publications, 2013.
- Liya-Sim-Maris’in Deniz Masalları, (Turkish), Istanbul: Demavend, 2019. (پریانه‌های لیاسندماریس)

== Movies and animation adaptations of works ==
- 200 plays for the children and adolescents program of TV Network, 1997.
- short film of "In the Darkness of the Night" adaptation of her story on "Backstage Stairs", 1997.
- Theatrical performance of "Dowr Gardoon", adaptation of her novel, 2003.
- Publication of the play "Dowr Gardoun" adaptation of her novel, Seyed Hossein Fadaei Hossein, 2010.
- Screenwriting 17 stories for the animated series "Goats Goats Village", Saba Animation Center, 2014.
- Screenwriting of "Mr. Charkhashi's Family", Saba Animation Center, 2016.
- The Black Tail-Headed Monster Animation, adaptation of her story, 2018.
- The animation "Compassionate Disease", adaptation of "Mr. Charkhashi's Family" book, Center for Intellectual Development, 2021.
- Writing a screenplay " Liasandmaris Fairies", adaptation of her novel, by the Center for Intellectual Development, 2021.
