= Amir H. Ladan =

Amir H. Ladan a researcher, writer and political activist has written numerous articles and spoken on American foreign policy as it relates to the Middle East, oil and Iran. (The United Nations Association of the United States of America (UNA-USA) Florida chapter, The Foundation for Middle East Communication, church & civic groups).

== Early life and imprisonment ==
He established the Defense Organization for Freedom (DOF) in Chicago in 1968 to promote Human Rights, Justice and Democracy in Iran. Returning to Iran in 1973 he set up DOF as a co-ordinating committee for activities against the monarchy and participated in the Revolution of 1978–79. Following the overthrow of the Shah, he was imprisoned by Khomeini’s government and placed on death row along with 511 other activists, political leaders and industrialists, 504 were executed and 8 were exiled.

== Career ==
After his release from political prison in 1980, he returned to the United States and became a naturalized American. In 1989 he served on the national advisory council of The Foundation for Middle East Communication, based in Washington, D.C. During the Iran/Iraq war he founded Coalition for Iran Iraq Peace, holding numerous events demanding peace and highlighting the devastating effects of war.

As a founding member of the Iranian National Conference (INC) (1995) and a member of its executive committee, in 1997 he appeared in front of the Congressional Foreign Relations Committee with fellow INC member, Dr. Mehdi Haeri Khorshidi. INC, an all-inclusive gathering of Iranian political groups, associations and activists in diaspora, opposed the Islamic Republic, and promoted human rights, freedom and democracy in Iran until its dissolution in 1999.

Ladan continues to speak out for human rights; "Human Rights & Religion"; "Starving for Justice".

In 2014 he published Divine Right & Backwardness, the Struggle for Justice, Liberty & Democracy. This book deals with the question, "Why the nation that has contributed so much to human progress and civilization lives in a backward society under a theocratic dictatorship?"

Ladan, born December 5, 1943, in Tehran, Iran, moved to Austria then Germany in 1959. He came to the United States in 1964 and graduated from Woodrow Wilson College in 1968. After receiving a degree in political science from the University of Illinois Chicago Circle, he returned to Iran, where in 1975 he attended the Industrial Management Institute (IMI), an affiliated Master of Business Administration program of Columbia University.

== Publications ==
- Divine Right & Backwardness The Struggle for Justice, Liberty & Democracy, ISBN 978-1-59584-428-6, 2014

Articles have appeared in:

- Asre-nou.net
- Gooya.org
- Akhbar-rooz.com
- Peykeiran.com
- Roshangari.net and
- Iranian.com

Frequent contributor to:

- Iran Times
- Shahrvand
- Persian Heritage
- Kayhan
