= Peyman Esmaeili =

Iranian writer and journalist (born 1977)

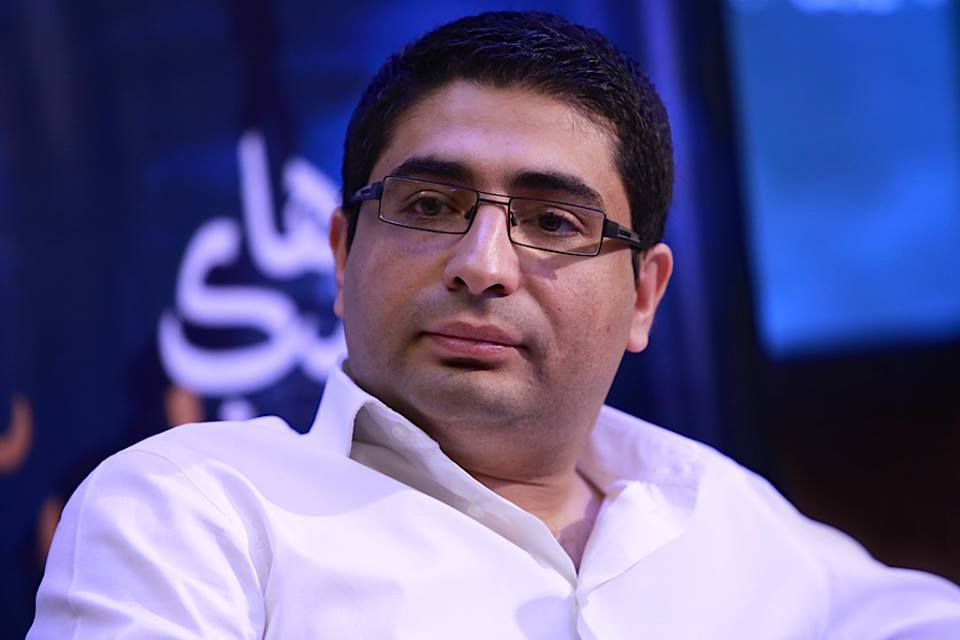
- Peyman at the 2012 Golshiry Book Festival
- Born: 1977 (age 48–49); Tehran, Imperial State of Iran
- Occupation: Author
- Website: WikiAdabi-Peyman.com

Peyman Esmaeili (Persian: پیمان اسماعیلی; born 1977) is an Iranian writer, critic and journalist who has written two novels and three collections of short stories. He is well known for winning several literary awards in Iran and is identified as one of the leading writers of modern Persian prose.

== Biography ==
Peyman Esmaeili was born to a middle class Kurdish family raised in Kermanshah, a city that to date has not quite recovered from the Iran–Iraq War. His works are heavily influenced by endless airstrikes and casualties, and Kernashahsh's harsh winters have shaped his memories of the formative years of his life.

At the age of eighteen, Peyman moved to Tehran to study electrical engineering, a discipline that led him to jobs in the oil and gas industry, his full-time on-site work and tasks, did not stop him from pursuing his passion for literature. He started writing book reviews and short essays for different literacy magazines in his early twenties. The most significant part of his resume as a freelance journalist is the series of interviews he conducted with famous Western writers such as Kurt Vonnegut, Joyce Carol Oates, Stanisław Herman Lem, Jhumpa Lahiri, Paul Auster, and Michael Cunningham.

Peyman’s debut short story collection, Search Your Raincoat Pockets (2005), brought him national critical acclaim. His second collection. Snow and the Cloud Symphony (2008), won six awards, including the Golshiry, Mehregan and Press Critics’ Awards. His novel, The Guardian was published in 2014. Peyman has started on this novel when he moved to Australia, a life-changing experience that greatly influenced his writing, and especially his recent work, let's go back tonight (2017), a collection of five stories that can be described as the author’s contemplations on migration.

Three elements in his fiction distinguish his work from that of other writers of his generation: first, the rural and sometimes wild settings that take the reader away from the social and inner struggles of Tehran’s middle class. Second, the powerful presence of nature and, third the recurrence of extreme situations that blur the line between the characters’ humanity and their animalistic nature. The characters, all ordinary people, are tested against their moral values as raw fear and survival instinct break them down.

== Works ==
- Novels and Novellas
1. The Guardian, 2014.
2. Laak, 2026.
- Short Stories and Collection
1. Search Your Raincoat Pockets, 2005.
2. Snow and the Cloud Symphony, 2008.
3. Let's go back tonight, 2017.
- Screenplay
1. The Bora, 2024. IMDB
- Nominated for the Asian Future Best Film Award- 37th Tokyo International Film Festival 2024
- Nominated for the Vanguard Award- Rising international talents- 44th Vancouver International Film Festival 2025
- Translated Short Stories
1. Sweet Scent of Skin, Gallimard Foreign Literature Publication as part of French-Iranian Anthology named Persian Love, French translation, March 2021.
2. Elefanti nella neve (A herd of white elephants), Internazionale Magazine by Giacomo Longhi, Italian Translation, December 2021.
3. Water World, Nimrod Journal by Laetitia Nanquette and Ali Alizadeh, English Translation, 2019.
4. Water World, Mazda Publication as part of Shades of Truth anthology by Veronica Thompson, Manijeh Mannani and, Eli Dehnavi, English Translation, 2019.
5. Water World, Deus Ex Machina magazine by Stijn Van Asch, Dutch Translation, 2019.
6. Memorial Day, Association for the study of Persian literature at New York University by Shima Houshyar, English translation, 2017.
7. In Between Empty Hollows, The Bombay Review, by Ati Everson, New York, English translation, 2021.
8. Animal Diseases, Y'ALLA Magazine, Texan Journal of Middle Eastern Literature, By Neda Mohtashami and George Warner, English Translation, December 2021

== Awards ==
Snow and the Cloud Symphony a collection of seven stories published by Cheshmeh, was praised with many awards and critical acclaim:

1. Houshang Golshiri Literary Award for the best collection of short stories in 2008.
1. Mehrgan Award for the best collection of short stories in 2007-2008.
2. The Critics and Journalists Award for the best collection of short stories in 2008.
3. Rozi Rozegari Award for the best collection of short stories in 2009.
4. Isfahan Literary Award for the single short stories namely Animal Disease and Between the Empty Hollows.

Let's go back tonight, Peyman's latest collection has established his reputation as a writer who successfully adopted the influence of migration, this collection has won Ahmad Mahmoud Award in 2017.

"Chehel Literary Award" Recognition, Peyman Esmaeili received the Chehel (Under 40) Literary Award, granted to Persian fiction writers between 35 and 40 years of age who have made significant contributions to literature.
