= Amanda Enayati =

Iranian-American author

- Notable works: Seeking Serenity

Amanda Enayati is an Iranian-American author, columnist, and communications strategist best known for her self-help book, Seeking Serenity: The 10 New Rules for Health and Happiness in the Age of Anxiety. She has also contributed to CNN, PBS and Salon and to the publication of Faith: Essays from Believers, Agnostics, and Atheists.

== Life and career ==
Enayati was born in Tehran and moved to Europe at the age of 11 before moving to the US when she was sixteen; she has lived in Los Angeles and New York.

Enayati worked as a corporate lawyer before turning to writing; in 2024, she is the Head of Culture Innovation for the “3% Movement”.

Seeking Serenity was written after her recovery from breast cancer and has been well received. Library Journal wrote "while not earth-shattering, provides a positive, inexpensive avenue to inner peace." while The Dunn County News called it a "novel path to serenity". and the Mount Prospect Library found it a "useful guide to creating and maintaining inner peace.".
