= Lobat Vala =

Iranian poet and activist

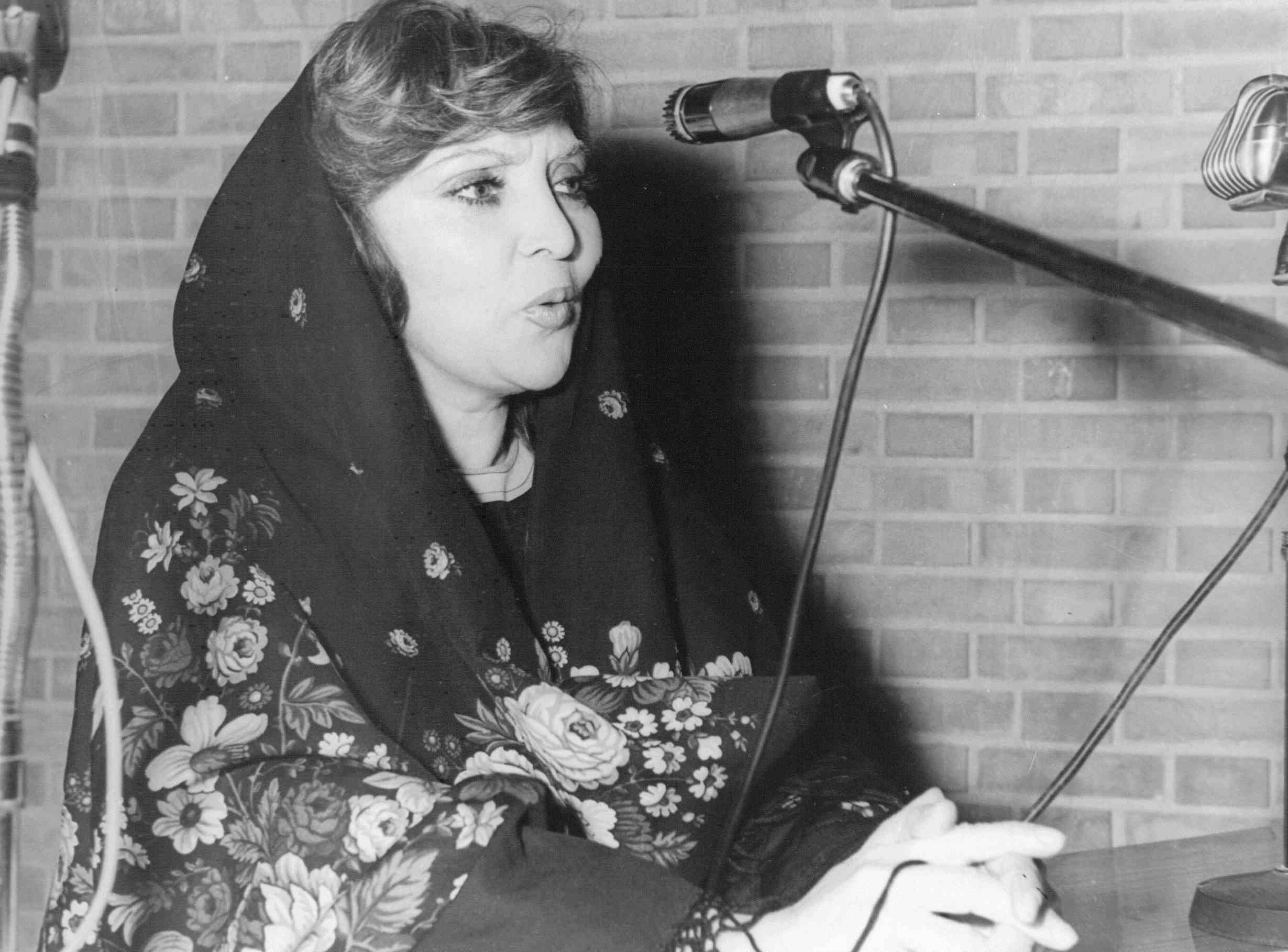
- Vala in 1970
- Native name: لعبت والا
- Born: 1930 (age 95–96) Tehran, Imperial State of Iran
- Occupation: Poet, activist
- Language: Persian

Lobat Vala (Persian: لعبت والا; born 1930 in Tehran) is an Iranian poet and campaigner for the Women Liberation and Equal Rights in Iran.

== Early life ==
Having been exiled from Iran since 1979, Vala lives in London, and she lived in Melbourne between 1980 and 1984. While there, she obtained an MA in Middle Eastern Studies from University of Melbourne and in London worked as a journalist and writer in Keyhan weekly newspaper until 2006. Vala has published several poetry books in Persian.
