= Maryam Hooleh =

Iranian writer and poet (born 1978)

Maryam Hooleh (born 1978) is an Iranian writer and poet.

== Early life ==
Maryam Hooleh is an Iranian Kurd currently living in Sweden. She was born in Tehran. She began to write at an early age. At the age of seventeen, Hooleh traveled from Iran to Greece, illegally and on foot. It took her 23 days to make the trip to Athens, where she stayed for one year before returning to Iran. Mansoureh Saboori, an American director and filmmaker, made a documentary about her life, her poems and her trip to Greece called Another Birth. (“Another birth” is also the name of a book written by Iranian poet Forugh Farrokhzad).

Hooleh's poetry deals with topics concerning the Islamic regime and hutouchede. It has touched on themes about the female body and repression under the regime. Her works tend to question religious and cultural taboos and criticise the human condition in the postmodern world. Her poetry is usually labeled as postmodernist.

== Work ==
Hooleh's first book, The kite will never fly in my hands, was published in 1998 by Midland Graphic publishing in Chicago. Her second book, In the Alleys of Athens, was published in 1999 by the Mir-Kasra publishing house in Tehran.

In 2000, Hooleh was invited by The Iranian Women Studies Foundation to Sweden where her third book, Cursed Booth, was published by Baran publications. In 2003, she won a literary scholarship from Swedish PEN and moved to Sweden. Her fourth and fifth books, Contemporaneous leprosy and Hell INC, were published by Arzan publications in 2004 and her sixth book, The Sticky Dreams of a Banished Butterfly, was published over the net as an E-book and Audio Book. Her poetry has also been among the most selected works for translation in anthologies.

Hooleh's poems have been translated to, among others, English, Swedish, French, Kurdish, and Turkish. In 2014, she was one of the poets invited to the Struga Poetry Evenings.

== Bibliography ==
- The kite will never fly in my hands - Midland Graphic publishing- Chicago 1998.
- In Athens streets - Mir Kasra publishing- Tehran 2000- first edition.
- Cursed Booth - Baran publishing- Stockholm 2000.
- Contemporaneous Leprosy - Arzan publishing- Stockholm 2004 first edition.
- Inferno Inc - Arzan publishing/ Stockholm 2004 first edition.
- The Sticky Dreams of a Banished Butterfly - Davat publishing and Maniha publishing- 2006.
- Contemporaneous Leprosy - Maniha publishing- Stockholm 2015- second edition.
- Inferno Inc - Maniha publishing- Stockholm 2015- second edition.
- Collusion In This Secret - Maniha publishing- Stockholm 2015.
