= Ahmad Beiranvand =

Iranian poet and writer

- Born: February 1, 1985 (age 41); Khorramabad, Iran
- Occupations: Poet, writer

Ahmad Beiranvand (Persian: احمد بیرانوند, born February 1, 1985, in Khorramabad) is an Iranian poet and writer. His activities revolve around poetry, fiction, and literary criticism, which his books and essays are about.

== Literary career ==
Beiranvand published his first poetry collection titled Illumination in Sunlessness (Persian: اشراق در بی شمسی) by Mina publication in 2005. Between 2005 and 2010, he studied ancient texts and modern prose and investigated poetic trends after Nima. The result of these studies was the publication of the book Commentary on Commentary (Persian: شرح حاشیه) in which he analyzed the poetic trends after Nima and the publication of the book Gabriel's Untold Words (Persian: ناگفته‌های جبرئیل) in which he combined modern prose and shathi texts. The book Commentary on Commentary was published by Roozegar and is studied in some universities in Iran as an additional source for MA students. Gabriel's Untold Words was also translated into English by Atoosa Rahmati and published in Sweden, but it was banned in Iran after a while. Beiranvand has also focused on fiction, for example, in the essay "Manifesto of the Passing by Story" (Persian: مانیفست داستان عبور) in which he proposes a new way of storytelling. His works include creating a scientific method for photo poems together with Maryam Ehsani in Roodaki magazine and focusing on "body" poetry. For a while, he wrote stories about the world of animals with his friends in a story-writing workshop that would be published. His activities include being the jury of literary festivals, writing essays about the role of phenomenology in stories, writing plays, etc. He is currently the administrator and chief editor of the academic website avangardha.com where he follows the avant-garde movements in contemporary literature.

== Published works ==
- Illumination in Sunlessness (Poetry collection, 2005)
- Commentary on Commentary (2010)
- Gabriel's Untold Words (Prose collection, 2011)
- The Hint Bird (Prose collection, 2011, banned in Iran in 2012)
- Poetics of Spacementalism (2013)
- Human Jungle (Short story collection, 2016)

== See also ==
- Nima Yooshij
- Sohrab Sepehri
- Mohammad-Taqi Bahar
- Hushang Ebtehaj
- Gholamreza Ghodsi
- Ali Babachahi
- Mohammad Hoqouqi
- Heydar Yaghma
- Mohammad-Ali Sepanlou
- Fereidoon Tavallali
- Habibollah Chaichian
- Hamid Reza Shekarsari

== Sources ==
- Hamshahri newspaper. Interview with Ahmad Beiranvand
- Mehrname magazine. A review by Ali Masoudinia on the book Commentary on Commentary by Ahmad Beiranvand
- Mehr News. The Hint Bird by Ahmad Beiranvand was banned.
- Matneno website. Introduction and review of Gabriel's Untold Words
- Fars News. Nademi and Mirjafari's review on the book Commentary on Commentary by Ahmad Beiranvand
- Resalat newspaper. A review by Shirzad Bastami on the poetry collection Illumination in Sunlessness by Ahmad Beiranvand
- Ketab News. An overview of the book Commentary on Commentary
