= Golshiri =

Golshiri (Persian: گلشیری) is a surname. Notable people with the surname include:

- Barbad Golshiri (born 1982), Iranian media artist and critic; son of Houshang
- Houshang Golshiri (1938–2000), Iranian writer, fiction critic, and editor
- Payam Golshiri (Persian: پیام گلشیری), the name of Al-Masih, in 2020 TV series Messiah
