= Siba Shakib =

Iranian/German filmmaker, writer and political activist

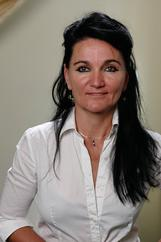
Siba Shakib

Siba Shakib (Persian: زیبا شکیب) is an Iranian/German filmmaker, writer and political activist. She was born and raised in Tehran, Iran. Her international bestseller Afghanistan, Where God Only Comes to Weep has been translated into 27 languages and won a P.E.N. prize

== Career ==
Before writing her first novel, Shakib was a music journalist and a radio presenter. She also interviewed many musicians for television, including Miles Davis, Mick Jagger and Tina Turner. She often offered her political observation and commentary during these interviews, leading to her current political television shows for a young audience.

Later when she moved on to do films and documentaries, her work reflected the social and economic situation of needy people worldwide.

Shakib spoke at the 2014 Secular Conference about women's rights, religion and tradition.

Since the early 1990s, Shakib has primarily worked in two countries: Iran, where she was born and raised, and neighboring Afghanistan. Her film A Flower for the Women of Kabul received a German Human Rights film prize on the 50th anniversary of the UN Human Rights declaration.

Shakib used some of the royalties from her films and books to help build a woman’s center in Kabul.

She was finalizing her first book Afghanistan, Where God Only Comes to Weep in her home in New York when terrorists attacked the World Trade Center. For a week, Shakib supported the staff of the ARD, German Television in New York, by reporting about the attacks.

She received the renowned Peter Surava PEN prize for her first novel.

At the beginning of 2002, the German Ministry of Defence benefited from Shakib's insight and knowledge about Afghanistan and searched for her input and collaboration as an advisor for their peace troops, ISAF in Afghanistan. Later her activity was extended to supporting and advising the NATO troops in theatre.

Afghanistan, Where God Only Comes to Weep has been translated into 27 languages and Shakib has received numerous recognitions and prizes for it. Artworks, aid organizations, water wells, and kindergartens have been named after Shirin-Gol and other heroes of her books.

She is a supporter of the continuing Islamic regime staying in power, and she has done many interviews in DW against the regime's opposition.

== Future projects ==
Siba Shakib is currently working on several new book projects, historical novels on Iran, Afghanistan, Oman, Zanzibar and the story of a young Iranian boy, who is losing himself only to create a new identity as an attractive and cherished woman.

She is also working on adapting her second international bestseller Samira and Samir into a feature film. She has received grants and support from the German Filmstiftung NRW and MEDIA. Shakib has written the script, and she will also direct the movie herself. Currently, the Casting is in process. However, award-winning and well-known Iranian actress Golshifteh Farahani (Body of Lies, with Leonardo DiCaprio) has accepted to play the main role of SAMIRA.

Currently, she lives in New York City, Italy and Dubai.

== Works ==
=== Books ===
- Samira and Samir (2005), Arrow Books Ltd, ISBN 978-0-09-946644-4
- Afghanistan, Where God Only Comes to Weep (2002) Century, ISBN 978-0-7126-2339-1
- "ESKANDAR, (2009), Randomhouse Bertelsmann ISBN 3-570-00968-8 ISBN 978-3570009680

=== Film ===
- A Flower for the Women in Kabul - 50 years UN (1998), director, (won first human rights film prize)
- Alone in Afghanistan - the story of a nurse and her hospital (1997) director
- And Hope Remains: the story of a child soldier (1996), director and script
- Tonino the Camora (1995), director
- Shoes - a little psychology (1992), director
- Iran - 10 year post Revolution (1989), director
- Mahmoudy versus Mahmoody, director
- "SAMIRA & SAMIR", Gemini
