= Ali Abdolrezaei =

British-Iranian poet (born 1969)

- علی عبدالرضایی
- Born: April 10, 1969 (age 57); Langerud, Iran
- Education: King's College London; Khajeh Nasir Toosi University of Technology
- Occupations: Poet, writer, literary theorist, political analyst
- Writing career
- Language: Persian, English
- Years active: 1986–present
- Literary movement: Postmodernism and New Modernism
- Website: iranarchism.com

Ali Abdolrezaei (b. April 10, 1969; Persian: علی عبدالرضایی) is an Iranian-British poet, writer, literary theorist and political analyst with over 70 books. Before leaving Iran in 2001 he was known as one of the most innovative poets of the contemporary Persian literature and poetry. He is also the leader of the Iranarchist party, a movement in Iran fighting against the Islamic Republic. Abdolrezaei is also known by Mouta, the "wise teacher" in old Persian.

== Early life ==
Ali Abdolrezaei was born on 10 April 1969 into a middle-class farming and merchant family in the northern city of Langerud, Iran. When he was five, his newborn sister died unexpectedly. This overwhelming cogitation during her funeral led to a mini stroke resulting in his loss of speech. After a few months, Abdolrezaei regained speech, but it was newly characterized by a severe stammer. By age of 16 after undergoing speech therapy he fully overcame the impediment.

== Education ==
After finishing high school in Langerude, Abdolrezaei attended the Khajeh Nasir Toosi University in Tehran, where he studied mechanical engineering.

== Life and career ==
Abdolrezaei's career as a poet began in 1986. Not long after, he was banned from teaching and from public speaking in Iran. In 1996 when the Iranian president Khatami eased censorship, Abdolrezaei's new book "Paris in Renault" was published in Iran. It received much attention for its avant-garde views concerning language and postmodernism. He received many invitations to lecture on poetry, but only accepted those extended by universities. He thus became known as the “University Poet.” As his ideas gained more traction in Iran, the Islamic Republic of Iran (IRI) heightened its scrutiny and surveillance of Abdolrezaei. Censorship of his writings also intensified. In his books "So Sermon of Society" and "Shinema," Abdolrezaei criticized Khatami and other political reformers. The Iranian government interdicted his writings after the publication of “Shinema” and banned him from teaching and public speaking.

Abdolrezaei began considering invitations from foreign publishing companies, scholarly societies, and individuals to give lectures and read poetry outside of Iran. He, therefore, left Iran in 2001, first to France, then to Germany and since 2005 taking up residence in England. Once established in England, he began holding poetry workshops, and later from 2014 to 2016 he was elected the chairperson of the United Kingdom's Exiled Writers Ink.

In 2014, he founded College-e Sher (College of Poetry) for enthusiasts to learn poetry and writing. Around 90% of the over 17,000 students who studied there were from inside Iran and 10% from abroad; they were all connected via Telegram.

In December 2017, when a large group of Iranians who were the victims of the IRI's embezzlements went onto the street to protest in over 150 cities, the students of College of Sher joined them.

In light of this uprising, Abdolrezaei's students appealed to him to change the focus of the studies and to campaign against the prevalent corruptions. Thus the focus of his teachings changed from poetry and writing to concentrate mostly on political activism; and when the college gradually grew into more than 100,000 students it changed from being a school into a political party. This newly established party was named Iranarchist Party. Although based on Anarchism doctrine, it also presented its own principles designed to fit the challenges the Iranian people were facing for decades with a totalitarian Islamic regime. Abdolrezaei's ideas on Anarchism centered on limited government interference, in which the government was to act as the provider of public services to the people.

Ali Abdolrezaei resides in London, England.

== Work ==
Abdolrezaei's contributions to the intellectual circles began with the 1991 publication of his first book Only Iron-Men Rust In The Rain. Between 1992 and 2001, when Postmodernism attracted more enthusiasts among Persian artists, Abdolrezaei, along with few other poets further popularized the movement.

Twelve volumes of Abdolrezaei's poetry were published while he lived in Iran; the remainder have been published in exile. In 2013, years after his self-imposed exile and 13 years after the banning of his works in Iran, the government permitted the release of four of Abdolrezaei's newer books between 2013 and 2014. His books met with high demand and underwent several rounds of publications. Seven months after their release, however, government officials confiscated them at the Tehran Book Fair. The ban on Abdolrezaei's work has since resumed.

Poetry International notes that Abdolrezaei's postmodern poems “center on the problematic nature of language, knowledge and subjectivity.”

Abdolrezaei, also called the “Anarchist Poet” is one of 34 international poets whose work was selected by the British Library for its sound archives. His poems have been translated into many languages including English, German, French, Turkish, Spanish, Arabic, Portuguese, Dutch, Swedish, Finnish, Croatian and Urdu.

Abdolrezaei's poetry became renowned amongst Iranians in the 1990s for its artful handling of difficult subjects. Iran's traumatic political history over the last four decades has been a major, if not primary, theme in much of Iran's contemporary art; Abdolrezaei's poetry epitomizes this dynamic.

Abdolrezaei has been described as "one of Iran's most influential poets”. He has also been described as "one of the most serious and contentious poets of the new generation of Persian poetry.” His influence extends even to poets and writers of different genres, and it purportedly motivated a group of young poets to distance themselves from the legacy of modern Persian poetry in order to establish the Persian New Poetry form. The Persian New Poetry movement features colloquial language and modern subject matter, deviating from traditional themes of deep emotion, nature, etc.

== Political views ==
In politics, Abdolrezaei believes that true democracy never features a "top-down" structure.

Ali Abdolrezaei pursued his strong interest in bottom-up, anti-authority political stances by delving into the study of Anarchism and Eco-Socialism beginning around the year 2000. He began speaking about it at underground gatherings and published multitudinous Anarchist essays, for which the Internet became a primary mode of dissemination.

=== Iranarchism ===
Abdolrezaei coined the term “Iranarchism” and became the spokesperson for the Iranarchist Party (also known as Barandazan (the Topplers.) Founded in 2017, the focus of the Iranarchism was the many issues of the Middle Eastern societies from the perspective of anarchism. Iranarchists protest against the Islamic Republic's government and international terrorist activities.

Abdolrezaei's Manifesto of Iranarchism is structured in seven parts. The first installment appeared in written form on the Iranian website Akhbare-rooz in 2013. It later appeared in audio form on YouTube. In early 2016, Abdolrezaei published the book “Anarchists are More Real”, a selection of writings totaling over 400 pages describing why he believes in Anarchism for Iran.

The party's manifesto and the nine related books streamline the principles that his party is built on and the ideology it promotes. The closest Anarchist classifications to Iranarchism are Eco-Anarchism and Post Anarchism. There are two principles that are unique to Iranarchism. One is the decentralization of the government and the other is the establishment of a referendum office.

In the decentralization of the government, the governmental departments and offices are each assigned to a specific province. In this, the belief is that the decentralized departments will distribute the jobs and the wealth they create equally among all people.

In establishing a referendum office, the democracy in action is insured. This office will have the responsibility of collecting the public opinions and votes on matters related to governing the country, disabling any opportunity for a dictatorship to take over.

Abdolrezaei also considers two types of democracy for Iran, which he calls “hybrid democracy” consisting of direct and indirect democracies. In the direct democracy, the representatives and members of the government are selected through a yearly referendum. In the indirect democracy, the congress representatives are voted in through free elections.

== Influences ==
In poetry, Abdolrezaei was interested in Persian poets such as Forough Farrokhzad, Nima Youshij and Ahmad Shamlou; and among non-Iranians he enjoyed the works of Nazim Hikmat, Vladimir Mayakofsky and Arthur Rimbaud. During his postmodernism period he was introduced to John Ashbery.

In philosophy Abdolrezaei is influenced by Friedrich Nietzsche, Michel Foucault, Marquis de Sade and Gilles Deleuze. Saul Newman’s Post Anarchism theory also influenced Abdolrezaei’s concept of Iranarchism.

== Interviews ==
- I still write because I’m sorry, AN INTERVIEW WITH ALI ABDOLREZAEI, Poetry International Web. In this interviews Abdolrezaei explains his poetic theory.
- Interview with "The Ofi Press Magazine", Interview through email by Jack Little, UK/Mexico.
- The Poet of Creativity In Exile, Ali Abdolrezaei speaks to Paloma Concierta from where he now lives and writes, in exile, in London.
- Ali Abdolrezaei and Abol Froushan interview, Interviewer: Cathy Aitchison, It was recorded at the Platforma Festival in December 2011 in London.
- Exile isn’t always freedom, World Press Freedom Day special, Radio Netherlands Worldwide, 2010

== Articles ==
- Fragments: Part 1, Part 2, Poetrymag, Abol Foroushan, 2009
- The Risk of Poetry, Poetry International Web, 2010
- Speaking in the voice of a generation, ALI ABDOLREZAEI’S POETRY, Poetry International Web, 2009

== Festivals ==
- Sens Public Festival, Paris, France, 2011.
- Platforma Festival, London, UK, 2011.
- Acts of Memory Festival, on human rights subject. Counterpoint, London, UK, 2011.
- Poetes a Paris, Paris, France, 2012.
- The First International Kosovo Poetry Festival, 2015.
- The Writers Conference, Nottingham, UK, 2015. Abdolrezaei recited some of his poems and spoke on censorship.
- Human Rights Poetry Festival. London, UK, 2016.
- The Danger of Words in the Age of Danger Symposium, London, UK, 2017. Abdolrezaei spoke on the subject of censorship and post-censorship.

== Awards ==
- In 2013 his book “Mothurt” was selected as the “Book of the Year” in Iran. Over ninety of the best Iranian critics and poets participated in this event.
- In 2014, “Lover Mover” was selected as the second best book of the year in the same competition.

== Bibliography ==
In Persian:

Poetry:

- 'Only Iron Men Rust in the Rain, Vistar, Tehran, 1991. College Publication – Only Iron Men Rust in the Rain
- 'You Name this Book', Tehran, 1992. College Publication – You Name this Book
- 'Paris in Renault', Narenj, Tehran, 1996. College Publication – parisdarrenault
- 'This Dear Cat', Narenj, Tehran, 1997. College Publication – ingorbehyeaziz
- 'Improvisation', Nim-Negah, Tehran, 1999. College Publication – Improvisation
- 'So Sermon of Society', Nim-negah, Tehran, 2000. College Publication – jaameeh
- 'Shinema', Hamraz, Tehran, 2001. College Publication – Shinema
- 'In Riskdom Where I Lived', Paris, 2005. College Publication – من در خطرناک زندگی می‌کردم
- 'A Gift Wrapped in Condom', Paris, 2006 College Publication – kaado kaandom ali adbolrezaei
- 'Terror', London, 2009 Poetrymag – terror ebook
- 'Fackbook', London, 2009 College Publication – shahriar kateban
- 'La Elaha Ella Love', Paris, 2010 College Publication – La Elaha Ella Love
- 'So, God exists', Paris, Paris Publication, 2010 College Publication - پس خدا وجود داره
- 'Hidden camera', London, Pasahaftad, 2011 College Publication - دوربین مخفی
- 'Third wisdom', London, Pasahaftad, 2011 College Publication- حکمت سین
- 'Fantasy', Dubai, Pasahaftad, 2011 Pasahaftad - فانتزی
- 'Cumulus', Paris, Paris publication, 2011 College Publication - کومولوس
- 'Open wound', Tehran, Nakoja, 2012 Nakoja - زخم باز
- 'Why Zarathustra laughed?', Tehran, Nakoja, 2013 Nakoja - زرتشت برای چه می‌خندید؟
- 'Mothurt', Tehran, Bootimar, 2013 Bootimar - مادرد Archived 2017-10-18 at the Wayback Machine
- 'Lover mover', Tehran, Bootimar, 2014 Bootimar - عاشق ماشق
- 'Speed, gear, speed', Tehran, Bootimar, 2014 Bootimar - گاز دنده گاز
- 'Forgive me God but not now', Tehran, Cheshmeh, 2014 Cheshmeh - خدایا مرا ببخش، حالا نه
- 'New Town', London, college publication, 2016 College Publication - شهر نو
- 'Erotica', London, college publication, 2016 College Publication - اروتیکا
- 'Spaghetti Republic', London, college publication, 2016 College Publication - جمهوری اسپاگتی
- 'Turtle', London, college publication, 2016 College Publication - آب‌لاکو
- 'Leylove, London, College Publication', 2017 College Publication - لیلاو
- 'Shernography, London, College Publication', 2017 College Publication - شعرنوگرافی

Story and novel:

- 'Hermaphrodite', Paris, 2006. PoetryPub.info – هرمافرودیت
- 'Messing about', (collection of short stories), Paris, Nakoja, 2013 Nakoja - بدکاری
- 'The bed is my desk', London, college publication, 2016 College Publication - تختخواب میز کار من است

Political:

- 'Anarchists are more realistic', London, college publication, 2016 College Publication - آنارشیست‌ها واقعی‌ترند
- 'Electoral Carnivals', London, college publication, 2017 College Publication - کارناوال‌های انتخاباتی

Literary Theory:

- 'The Worst Literature', Paris, 2007 Poetrymag – rakiktar az adabiat ali abdolrezaei
- 'The soiree with no one', Paris, Paris publication, 2012 College Publication - شب‌نشینی با مثل هیچ‌کس
- 'This Eternal Question', London, college publication, 2016 College Publication - این سوال ابدی
- 'I disagree with acceptance', London, college publication, 2016 College Publication - من با قبول مخالفم
- 'Heart Talk', London, college publication, 2016 College Publication - دیل گپ

In English:

- 'Short & little like i', CreateSpace Independent Publishing Platform, 2012 Short & little like i

Translated from Persian:

- 'In Riskdom Where I Lived', London, Exiled Writers Ink, 2007 (A collection of 28 poems translated into English by Dr. Abol Froushan) Poetrymag – In Riskdom Where I Lived
- 'In riskdom where I live', translated by: Saeed Ahmadzadeh Ardabili, Paris publication, 2004 (in Turkish) Paris publication - زندگی در خطرناک، ترجمه ترکی
- 'Only iron men rust in the rain', translated by: Alhabib Alvaei, Paris publication, (in Arabic) Poetrymag – Arabic skool
- 'Sixology', translated by:Abol Froushan, London, Paris publication, 2010 (in English) College Publication – sixology
- 'Zerbombt doch all das Weinen (Bombing on crying)', Paris, 2010 (A collection of 35 poems translated into German by Christina Ehlers Poetrymag – zerbombt doch all das weinen
- 'Cumulus (in Azerbaijani Turkish) Translated into Turkish by: Saeed Ahmadzadeh Ardebili, Paris publication, 2011 کومولوس - ترجمه ترکی آذربایجانی
- 'ÖLÜRƏMSƏ KİM BU YALNIZLIĞA DÖZƏR (Who will endure this loneliness, if I die?)', Paris, 2010 (A collection of poems translated into Turkish by Saeed Ahmadzadeh Ardebili) Poetrymag – istanbul skool
- 'That (Ese)', translated by: Elizabeth Lorena Faitarona de Ford, poetry publication, 2010 (in Spanish) Poetrymag – ese
- 'Hidden Camera', translated by:Abol Froushan, London, Pasahaftad, 2011 (in English) Pasahaftaad - Hidden Camera
- 'Hidden camera', translated by:Tayeb Houshyar, London, Pasahaftad, 2011 (in Kurdish) Pasahaftad - دوایین چرکه
- 'Ehtesab, translated by: Ahsan Nadim Sheykh, Pasahaftad, 2011 (in Urdu) Pasahaftad - احتساب
- 'No one says yes twice', translated by: Abol Froushan, London, London skool, 2012 (in English) London skool - No one says yes twice

Translation:

- 'I need your desert for my Sneeze', Abol Froushan, Translated to Persian by: Ail Abdolrzaei, Paris, Paris publication, 2009. Paris Publication - برای عطسه‌ام به بیابان تو محتاجم
