= Mohammad Tolouei =

Iranian writer

- محمد طلوعی
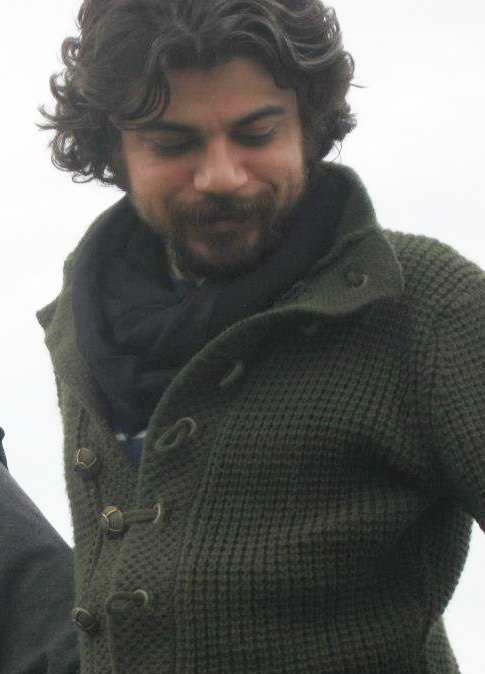
- Born: Seid-Mohammad Tolouei-Barazandeh; 11 May 1979; Rasht, Iran
- Education: Dramatic Literature MA
- Occupations: Writer, short-story writer, Dramatist, Poet
- Writing career
- Language: Persian
- Genre: Mockumentary
- Notable works: I'm Not Janette; Memoirs of the Acrobat "Fair Wind's Prey"
- Notable awards: 12th Golshiri Literary Awards

Mohammad Tolouei (Persian: محمد طلوعی; born 1979 as Seid-Mohammad Tolouei-Barazandeh, is an Iranian writer, screenwriter, and playwright.

He has won nationwide literary awards such as the Shahid Ghanipoor Award and Wow Literary Prize for his debut novel, Fair Wind's Prey. Compared to Martin Amis in his later prose, Tolouei has traversed a long way from his debut novel – an account of the inhabitants of Rasht in time of the Second World War, enforced emigration of Polish refugees through Iran, and the formation of the Communist Party in Iran – to his later stories with cunning use of mockumentary as dominant narrative technique. In 2011 Tolouei's debut short story collection, "I'm Not Janette" was released by Ofoq Publications. The book was hailed by many critics for its clean language and mastery over the subcultures of Iranian culture that had long been taken for granted in the contemporary literature. It won the 12th Golshiri Award for debut short story collection in February 2013. As of November 2011, Tolouei has contributed with Hamshahri Fiction Monthly. He is also the present director of The Iranian "Association of Writers for Children". His works have been published in periodicals such as Internazionale, Szuflada: Siedem sposobów na napisanie zbioru opowiadań dla początkujących adeptów pióra Szuflada, Asymptote Journal, Parsagon, and The Guardian.

== Works ==
=== Novels and Short Stories ===
- Encyclopedia of dreams (2025)
- The Seven Domes (2018)
- Anatomy of Depression (2017)
- Real Madrid: a novel for young readers (2015)
- Lessons by Father (2014)
- I'm Not Janette (2011)
- Fair Wind's Prey (2007)

=== Poetry ===
- Memoirs of the Acrobat
- Link to poems online

=== Plays ===
- Mirza Reza's Gun is on the Wall and Will Shoot in the Third Act
