= Roja Chamankar =

- Born: 20 May 1981 (age 45); Borazjan, Bushehr Province, Iran
- Occupation: Poet
- Writing career
- Language: Persian

Roja Chamankar (Persian: روجا چمنکار), born 20 May 1981 in Borazjan, Bushehr Province, Iran, in southern Iran, is a Persian poet.

She was born two years after the 1979 Iranian Revolution, studied Literature and Cinema in Tehran, and her Master in Cinematoghraphie is in Strasbourg. She participated in a number of international poetry festivals, including the Poetry Biennial Val-de-Marne in 2005 and the Voix vives de Méditerranée en Méditerranée festival in Sète in 2013.

Her poems have been published in various Iranian magazines and newspapers. She has also directed a film and has presented children's television programmes in Iran.

== Published works ==
- You've Gone, Bring Me Some South
- Nine Months Stones
- Escape My Lips from the Roof
- Dying in a Mother Tongue
