= Azadeh Moaveni =

American journalist and writer

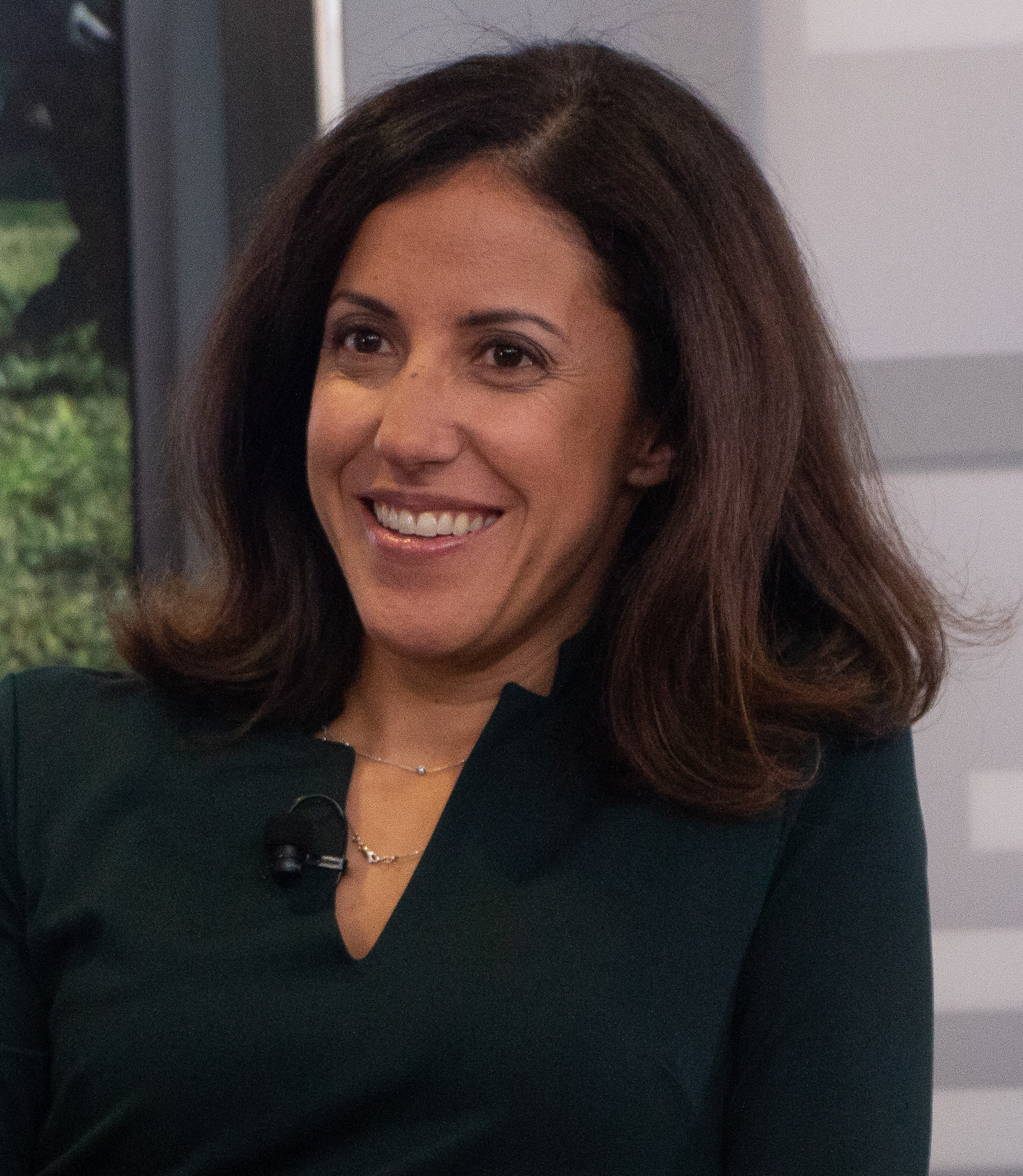
- Moaveni in 2019
- Born: 1976 (age 49–50); Palo Alto, California, U.S.
- Occupations: Writer, Journalist
- Writing career
- Genres: Memoir, news, commentary
- Subjects: Iran, Islamic State, Middle East, politics
- Notable work: Lipstick Jihad

Azadeh Moaveni (Persian: آزاده معاونى, born 1976) is an American writer, journalist, and academic. She is the former director of the Gender and Conflict Program at the International Crisis Group, and is Associate Professor of Journalism at New York University's Arthur L. Carter Institute of Journalism. She is the author of four books, including the bestselling Lipstick Jihad and Guest House for Young Widows, which was shortlisted for numerous prizes. She contributes to The New York Times, The Guardian, and The London Review of Books.

== Education ==
Moaveni was born in Palo Alto, California, to Iranian parents, who left Iran before the 1979 revolution. She grew up in Cupertino. She was educated at the University of California, Santa Cruz, where she studied politics and history. At Oakes College, the center of the university's History of Consciousness program, she ran programming at Bayit Elie Wiesel, and served as editor-in-chief of the university's newspaper, City on a Hill Press. She received a Fulbright Fellowship, and studied Arabic at the American University in Cairo.

== Career ==
Moaveni began reporting in Cairo, as a journalist for The Cairo Times, run by the human rights activist and editor Hisham Kassem, and later for Al-Ahram Weekly, where she worked with editor Khaled Dawoud, writing about the region and books. She first travelled to Iran as a journalist in 1999, reporting for Al-Ahram on the 1999 student uprising. She spent the next three years based in Tehran for Time magazine, first as a reporter covering youth culture and the Iranian reform movement, and then later as a correspondent around the region, covering Lebanon, Syria, Iraq and Egypt. In May 2001, she reported on the Israeli withdrawal from southern Lebanon, and interviewed Hezbollah leader Hassan Nasrullah. Based in New York for Time, she reported on diplomacy at the United Nations, and the inspections regime in Iraq.

Shortly before the US invasion of Iraq, Moaveni joined the Los Angeles Times, and reported the unfolding war and its aftermath for the paper. She travelled in the convoy of Ayatollah Baqer al-Hakim from Tehran through Najaf, as the Shia Iraqi opposition in exile returned to the country after the fall of Saddam Hussein. In the Baghdad bureau of the Times, she reported on the looting of the Baghdad museum, the political revival in Iraqi Kurdistan, and how the growing insecurity in Baghdad led to girls being kept home from school.

In 2005, Moaveni published Lipstick Jihad, a memoir that recounted her foray through Iranian youth culture in the restless heyday of the Iranian reform movement and a vibrant women's rights movement. A bestseller translated into multiple languages, the book remains a widely read core text in university classes across disciplines from Middle East studies to journalism to gender studies. It was described by Michiko Kakutani as "[The] sense of being an outsider in two worlds may have made daily life difficult for Ms. Moaveni, but it also makes her a wonderfully acute observer, someone keenly attuned not only to the differences between American and Iranian cultures, but also to the ironies and contradictions of life today in Tehran.

As a columnist for Time, she spent the next two years living in Tehran, writing about gender issues and motherhood. She collaborated with Nobel Peace Laureate Shirin Ebadi, and wrote her memoir Iran Awakening: A Memoir of Revolution of Hope, published in 2006. The book was translated into over twenty languages, and recounts Ebadi's life story as Iran's first female judge, and her support of a revolution that stripped her of that role. It charts how human rights lawyers and journalists sought to change discriminatory laws throughout the 1990s using the court of public opinion. The New York Times found it "fast-paced, suspenseful, and spare", and the Seattle Post-Intelligencer called it " the most important book you could read this year".

Moaveni's book Honeymoon in Tehran, published in 2010, explores the disillusionment of a generation coming of age under the Ahmadinejad years. Through stories of meeting underground musicians, race car drivers, young radicals, and scholars, she explores "the cultural identity crisis and class frustration that pits Iran's next generation against the Islamic system". Booklist called it the "perfect blend of political commentary and social observation".

In 2014, Moaveni joined journalism faculty at Kingston University and taught as Senior Lecturer, while freelance reporting for Foreign Policy, and The Financial Times.

In late 2015, she published a front-page story in The New York Times on Syrian women defectors from the Islamic State that was a finalist for a Pulitzer in International Reporting. The story revealed industrial-scale recruitment of women by the militant group, and emerged from research Moaveni conducted for her fourth book, Guest House for Young Widows: Among the Women of ISIS. In 2018, Moaveni was named a New America Fellow.

As director of the Gender and Conflict Project at the International Crisis Group, Moaveni reported and conducted field research on women's militancy and peace-building, gender dynamics of deadly conflict, and inclusive peace negotiations. Her fieldwork appeared in a 2019 documentary about women fleeing Boko Haram, which followed her and a colleague working in displacement camps in Maiduguri, Nigeria, speaking to women who often sought to return to the group. The following year, she travelled again to northeast Syria to report in Al-Hol and Al-Roj detention camps, speaking to women and children formerly affiliated with the Islamic State.

Her report on their plight, and the refusal of Western governments to repatriate their citizens, has been widely cited in years of advocacy around the subject. Her piece about a lost orphan in al-Hol published in The New York Times, "This Baby Is Going to Die", led the newspaper's website for two days.

Moaveni is Associate Professor of Journalism at NYU's Arthur L. Carter Journalism Institute, where she runs the program in Global Journalism.

== Books ==
- Lipstick Jihad: A Memoir of Growing up Iranian in America and American in Iran, PublicAffairs, 2005 ISBN 978-1586481933
- Iran Awakening: A Memoir of Revolution and Hope, Random House, 2006 ISBN 978-1400064700
- Honeymoon in Tehran: Two Years of Love and Danger in Iran, Random House, 2009 ISBN 978-1400066452
- Guest House for Young Widows: Among the Women of ISIS, Random House, 2019 ISBN 978-0399179754
- The East Wing: Power, Intrigue, and the Untold Story of America's First Ladies, St. Martin's Press, 2026 ISBN 978-1250390240

== Awards ==
- 2019 Baillie Gifford Prize for Non-Fiction, shortlist (Guest House for Young Widows, shortlist)
- Folio Rathbones Prize (shortlist)
- Orwell Prize for political writing, longlist
- New York Times Notable Book
- Maria Grazia Catulli prize

== See also ==
- Jasmin Darznik
- Persis Karim
- List of Iranian Americans
