= Zoya Pirzad =

Iranian writer

Zoya Pirzad (also spelled as Zoyā Pirzād; Persian: زویا پیرزاد; Armenian: Զոյա Փիրզադ; born 1952 in Abadan) is an Iranian-Armenian writer and novelist. Her mother is Iranian Armenian and her father comes from a Russian background. She grew up in Tehran and is now married with two sons, Sasha and Shervin.

== Works ==
Pirzad's first novel, Cheragh-ha ra man khamush mikonam (I Will Turn Off the Lights; published in English as Things We Left Unsaid) has been published numerous times in Iran and has been translated to several languages.

Stains in se ketab is written during the historical stage of Iran when due to common Islamic beliefs, many educated and intellectual Iranian women felt captured in their home and they were not allowed to participate in their society. This story can be analyzed based on Queer feminism theories which opposed to essentialism, the idea that a person’s true identity is composed of fixed and unchanging properties. Queer instead supports the idea that human identity is formed by the culture into which one is born. Recognizing that gender, what it means to be a man or a woman, is a constantly changing concept, they became social constructivists. She also uses the theories of Jung psychology which refers to some of our unconscious that is shared with all other members of the human species to express the influences of past generations, in which their thoughts and feelings toward women is still continuing in Iran’s society. In this story she talks about a modern Iranian woman's desires, confusion, and the domestic life of the woman that is not fulfilling any more.

== Awards ==
I Will Turn Off the Lights won the 2002 Hooshang Golshiri Literary Award for the 'Best Novel of the Year' for her "superb characterization, ingenious representation of the conflicting emotions of a woman, creating suspense through defamiliarization of everyday life, creating a language in perfect harmony with the theme and characters of the novel".

Zoya Pirzad has become the latest Iranian figure to receive France’s Chevalier of Legion of Honor award.

== Books ==
- Things We Left Unsaid (Cheraghha ra man khamush mikonam), tr. Franklin Lewis, London: Oneworld, 2012.
- The Space Between Us (Yek ruz mandeh beh eid-e pak 'The day before Easter'), tr. Amy Motlagh, London: Oneworld, 2014.
- The Acrid Taste of Persimmon (Ta'am-e gas-e khormalu)
- Like Every Evening (Mesl-e hame-ye asrha)
- We Will Get Used to It (Adat mikonim)

All the books mentioned above have been translated into French and published by Zulma Publishers in Paris.

Zoya Pirzad's works have also been translated into German, Greek, Italian, Polish, Slovene, Spanish and Turkish, published in those countries.

The Polish translation of the short story “Père Lachaise” appeared in the anthology Kolacja cyprysu i ognia. Współczesne opowiadania irańskie (Dinner of the Cypress and Fire. Contemporary Iranian Short Stories) selected and rendered into Polish by Ivonna Nowicka, Warszawa 2003.

== See also ==
- Persian literature
- List of famous Persian women
