= Ahmad Mahmoud =

Iranian novelist (1931–2002)

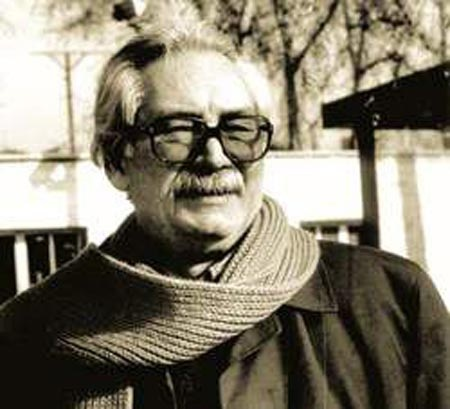

Ahmad E'ta (Persian: احمد اعطا; 25 December 1931 — 4 October 2002), better known by his pen name Ahmad Mahmoud (Persian: احمد محمود), was a prominent Iranian novelist from Ahvaz in southwestern Iran.

One of his works, The Neighbours stands out as one of the most notable novels in modern Persian Literature. He was known as a distinguished social realist writer; by his works mainly concerned the lives of working class and lower class families in the urban societies of southern Iran, especially in Khuzestan. He was a member of the Tudeh Party.

== Biography ==
In his youth he worked as a day labourer, driver, he also worked in a bakery for a long time and construction worker and suffered imprisonment for leftist political views and oppositionist activities. His first story appeared in Omid-e Iran magazine, and in 1959 Mahmoud began publishing collections of stories with Mul (The Paramour).

Other collections followed: Darya Hanuz Aram Ast (The Sea Is Still Calm) 1960, Bihudegi (Uselessness) 1962, Za'eri Zir-e Baran (A Pilgrim in the Rain) 1968, Pesarak-e Boumi (The Little Native Boy) 1971, and Gharibeh'ha (The Strangers) 1972. Modern Persian Short Stories (1980) features a translation of his 1969 story "Az Deltangi" (On Homesickness) from A Pilgrim In The Rain. Hamsayeha (The Neighbours) appeared in 1974 and gave him immediate status as a novelist.

Dastan-e Yek Shahr (Story of a City) was published in 1981. Zamin-e Sukhteh (The Scorched ground) was published in the spring of 1982 in a limited 11,000 copies, with a second printing a year later of 22,000 copies. The three novels are a continuing saga set in Khuzestan during three important periods: The days of nationalization of oil in 1951, the aftermath of the coup d'état which brought the Shah back to the throne in late August 1953, and Iraq's invasion of Iran in 1980.

In early 1990s, Mahmoud published two collections of short stories: Didar (Visiting) 1990, Qesseh-ye Ashna (Familiar Tale) 1991, Az Mosafer Ta Tabkhal (From Passenger To Cold Sore) 1992, Madare-h Sefr Darejeh (Zero Degree Orbit) 1993, Adam-e Zendeh (The Live Human) 1997, and Derakht-e Anjir-e Ma'abed (The Fig Tree Of The Temples) 2000. Mahmoud's last book won the "golshiri's book prize" and garnered much acclaim. In memory of his brother who died in the Iran–Iraq War, he wrote "the burned ground". Ahmad Mahmoud had a realist style of writing and was essentially a technical author. His book The neighbours was banned pre-revolution and is also banned currently post-revolution. Mahmoud was also a member of "kanoon-e-nevisandegan-e-iran".

Mahmoud died of respiratory failure in Tehran at the age of 71.

== Works ==
=== Short story collections ===
- Mul (The Paramour), 1957
- Darya Hanuz Aram Ast (The Sea Is Still Calm), 1960
- Bihudegi (Uselessness), 1962
- Za'eri Zir-e Baran (A Pilgrim In The Rain), 1967
- Pesarak-e Bumi (The Little Native Boy), 1971
- Gharibeh-ha (The Strangers), 1971
- Didar (Visiting), 1990
- Qesseh-ye Ashna (Familiar Tale), 1991
- Az Mosafer ta Tabkhal (From Passenger To Cold Sore), 1992

=== Interviews ===
- "Hekayat-e Hal" ("The Story Of My Condition Now"), a long interview with Ahmad Mahmoud by Ms. Lily Golestan, 1995

=== Novels ===
- Hamsayeh-ha (The Neighbors), 1974

Hamsayeha (“The Neighbors”), written in 1963 and published in 1966 by Ahmad Mahmoud, is a work of literary realism. “The Neighbors” is the story of Khaled, a teenager growing up during the period after the Anglo-Soviet invasion of Iran in 1941 until the coup of 1953, one of the most important eras in the history of Iran. Set in Ahvaz, a city in southern Iran, 15-year-old Khaled lives in a rental house with his mother, sister, and seven other families. After finding a job in a tea house, he experiences his first sexual encounter with Bolour Khanoom, the wife of Aman Aqa, the tea house owner. After breaking the window of a gendarme’s house, Khaled is arrested, and taken to the police station, where a prisoner named Pendar asks him to deliver a message to his partner, Shafiq. While trying to deliver the message, one thing leads to another, and he meets with members of the Tudeh Party of Iran (Major socialist party in Iran at the time), struggling to unify the Iranian working class against British colonialism through their support of the nationalization of oil. After trying to escape from a police officer chasing him because he participated in an illegal political meeting, Khaled breaks into a house and meets its resident, Siah-chesh (“Black-eyes”), whom he falls immediately in love with. Khaled is later re-arrested because of his increasing political involvement and ensuing entanglements. The rest of the story occurs in prison, ending when Khaled is freed and sent to serve in the military.

- Dastan-e Yek Shahr (Story Of a City), 1981
- Zamin-e Sukhteh (The Scorched Earth), 1982
- Madar-e Sefr Darajeh (The Zero Degree Orbit), 1993
- Adam-e Zendeh (The Live Human), 1997
- Derakht-e Anjir-e Ma'abed (The Fig Tree Of The Temples), 2000

== Awards ==
- 2001 Hooshang Golshiri Literary Awards, Best Novel, The Fig Tree of the Temples
