= Mahshid Amirshahi =

Iranian writer

Mahshid Amirshahi (Persian: مهشید امیرشاهی; surname also Romanized as Amir-Shahy or Amirshahy; born 9 April 1937) is an Iranian novelist, short story writer, humorist, literary critic, journalist, and translator.

== Biography ==
Amirshahi was born on 9 April 1937 in Kermanshah, Iran to Amir Amirshahi, a magistrate, and Moloud Khanlary, a political activist.

Amirshahi attended primary and part of the secondary school in Tehran Iran and later went to Charters Towers, a private boarding school in Bexhill-on-Sea Sussex, England. After obtaining her O- and A-levels in various subject matters she studied physics at Woolwich Polytechnic in London.

Dead End Alley (1345), Sar Bibi Khanum (1347), After the Last Day (1348), and in the first person singular (1350) were short stories written before the revolution. Hazr (1987), Safar (1995), and four volumes of the novel Mothers and Daughters were all published outside of the United States (1998-2009).

At the initial stages of the Islamic revolution in Iran she publicly took position against fundamentalism and in favour of a secular democracy. She was an open supporter of Shapour Bakhtiar (the last Premier of Iran prior to the Islamic Republic) and Dr. Mohammad Mossadegh. This forced her into exile in France, where she kept working in her writing and political activism. Some critics have called her novels: Dar hazar & Dar safar (At Home & Away) as well as her quartet: Maadaraan o Dokhtaraan (Mothers and Daughters), all written in exile, "modern classics of Persian literature".

Amirshahi has given many lectures at the Palais du Luxembourg (the French Senate) and Harvard University, and has written dozens of articles mostly in Persian with occasional contributions to publications such as Newsday (USA) and Les Temps Modernes (France) in English and French. One of her notable political stands while in exile has been her instigation of the declaration of the Iranian intellectuals and artists in defence of the British author Salman Rushdie, who had become the object of a notorious manhunt owing to the fatwa issued by Ayatollah Khomeini against him and his book The Satanic Verses. Mahshid Amirshahi was one of the founders of the "Comité de défense de Salman Rushdie en France" and a member of a similar Committee for Taslima Nasreen, the writer who was the target of attacks by fundamentalists in Bangladesh.

== Publications ==
=== Books/Novels ===
- The Blind Alley (1966) - collection of short stories, including:

"The Blind Alley"; "Enrolment Day"; "Addeh"; "Album"; "Convelesance" (Czech translation appeared in Novy Orient 7/71); "Pregnancy"; "Kaandaass"; "The Heat"; "Two Women"; "The Dogs"; "Nausea".

- Bibi Khanom’s Starling (1968) - collection of short stories, including:

"Bibi Khanom’s Starling" (two French translations by two different translators); "Brother’s Future Family" (translated by M. Beard in Chicago Anthology/ Stories from Iran; also translated by J. E. Knörzer under the title "Big Brother’s Future In-Laws"); "Ya’ghoub the Subtle" (French translation by M. Ghaffary); "The Russet Cockroach"; "Khoramshar-Tehran"; "Rain and Loneliness" (German translation "Regen und Einsamkeit" in Die Beiden Ehemänner, Prosa aus Iran, Berlin: Rütten & Loening); "My Grandfather is ..." (translated by J. E. Knörzer in Suri & Co.); "Counting the Chicks Before they are Hatched"; "Party"; "The Smell of Lemon Peel; the Smell of Fresh Milk" (translated by H. Moayyad in Stories from Iran, 1991).

- After the Last Day (1969) - A collection of short stories, including:

"After the Last Day" (translated by J. Green: Stories by Iranian Women, Heinemann); "Women’s Mourning Ceremony" (see Suri & Co.); "Agha Soltan from Kermanshah"; "The End of Passion Play" (translated by M. Southgate: Modern Persian Short Stories, Three Continents Press); "The Christening of Simin’s Baby" (see Suri & Co.); "The Mist of the Valley, the Dust of the Road"; "Interview" (see Suri & Co.); "Here and Now" (translated by R. Monajem; Iran Peyvand's Literature).

- First Person Singular (1970) - collection of short stories, including:

"Labyrinth" (translated by Micheal Beard under the title "The String of Beads", Edebiyât, vol. III, No. 1, 1978); "Payton Place" (see Stories by Iranian Women, Heinemann; also Suri & Co.); "Last Name…, First Name…, No. of Birth Certificate…"; "Paykan Place" (see Suri & Co.); "The Sun Under Grand Dad’s Pelisse".

- Mahshid, Amirshahi (1995). Suri & Co.: Tales of a Persian Teenage Girl (Modern Middle East Literature in Translation Series). Center for Middle Eastern Studies, The University of Texas at Austin. p. 97. ISBN 978-0-292-70463-3.
- An Anthology of Short Stories (1972)
- Mahshid, Amirshahi (1982). Yekrangi یکرنگی.
- At Home (1987) – A Novel of Iran's Revolution [Persian Title: Dar Hazar]
- Mahshid, Amirshahi (1995). Dar Hazar. شركت كتاب،. p. 428. ISBN 978-1-883-81908-8. – A novel about Iranians in Exile
- Mahshīd, Amīrshāhī (1995). Dar Safar. انتشارات شركت كتاب،. p. 458. ISBN 978-1-883-81906-4.
- Short Stories (1998) - including the four previous collections & "The Tune of the Lonely Bird" and "Maryam’s Messiah"
- Mahshīd, Amīrshāhī (1998). Dāstānhā-yi kūtāh. نشر باران،. p. 458. ISBN 978-9-188-29698-6.
- Abbass Khan’s Wedding (1998) – Book One of a quartet called Mothers and Daughters
- Dadeh Good Omen (1999) – Book Two of Mothers and Daughters
- Miscellaneous (2000) – [Persian title: Hezaar Bishe] An anthology of Views, Reviews and Interviews in Persian, English and French
- Shahrbanoo’s Honeymoon (2001) – Book Three of Mothers and Daughters
- CD – Short Stories Read by the Author
- Persian Fables for Our Time (2010)
- Mehre-Oli'a‘s Reminiscences (2010) - Book Four and final volume of Mothers and Daughters
- Mahshid, Amirshahi (2012). Modern Persian Short Stories.

=== Other literary works ===
A few of her short stories have been translated into French, German, Czech, Bulgar, Arabic. The following are translated into English:

- Mahshid, Amirshahi; Nasrin, Rahimieh; Knörzer, J. E. (1996). "Suri & Co.: Tales of a Persian Teenager". World Literature Today. 70 (1): 234. doi:10.2307/40152016. JSTOR 40152016.
- Mahshid, Amirshahi (1998). Dāstānhā-yi kūtāh. نشر باران،. ISBN 978-9-188-29698-6.
- "String of Beads". Translated by Michael Beard, Edebiyât, Vol II, n°1, 1978
- "After the Last Day". Translated by John Green
- Peyton Place: Tehran 1972. Translated by Micheal Beard, Heinemann, 1993
- "The End of the Passion Play". Translated by Minoo Southgate & Bjorn Robinson Rye, in Modern Persian Short Stories, Three Continents Press, 1980
- "Brother’s Future Family". Translated by Micheal Beard
- "The Smell of Lemon Peel, the Smell of Fresh Milk". Translated by Heshmat Moayyad, in Stories from Iran, A Chicago Anthology 1921–1991, Mage Publishers, 1991.
- Vafa, Amirhossein (2018). "Race and the Aesthetics of Alterity in Mahshid Amirshahi's Dadeh Qadam-Kheyr". Iranian Studies. 51 (1): 141–160. doi:10.1080/00210862.2017.1350095.

== Awards and recognition ==
- Mahshid Amirshahi was awarded the Annual Bita Prize in 2013 by Hamid and Christina Moghadam Program in Iranian Studies at Stanford University which is intended to celebrate a life-time of singular accomplishments—and the luminaries who have won the award.
