= Sahar Delijani =

Iranian author

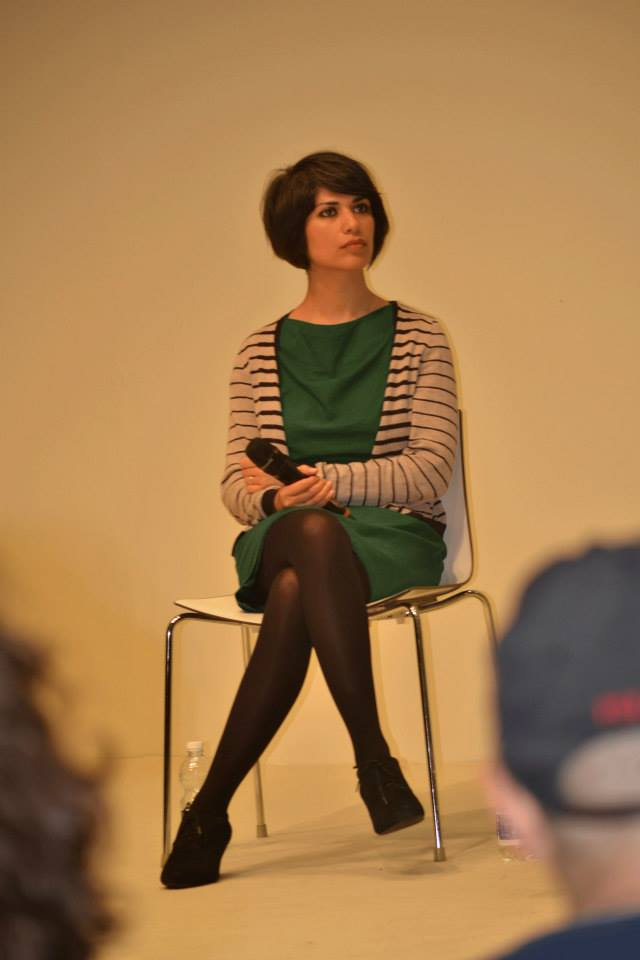
- Delijani in 2013
- Born: 1983 (age 42–43); Tehran, Iran
- Education: University of California, Berkeley (BA)
- Occupation: Novelist
- Writing career
- Language: Persian, English, Italian, French, Spanish, Azeri
- Notable work: Children of the Jacaranda Tree

Sahar Delijani (Persian: سحر دلیجانی; born 1983) is an Iranian American author. Her internationally acclaimed debut novel, Children of the Jacaranda Tree, has been translated into 32 languages and published in more than 75 countries.

== Life ==
Sahar Delijani was born in Evin Prison in Tehran, while both her parents were detained as leftist political activists, fighting against the newly established Islamic regime. Delijani's mother spent two years and a half in prison and her father four years. Her uncle, her father's younger brother, however, was among thousands of political prisoners executed and buried in mass graves by the regime in 1988.

Delijani, her older brother and her cousin were raised by her grandparents and aunt until their parents' release. Much of this experience, inside and outside Evin Prison, serves as an inspiration for Delijani's debut novel, which spans the decades from 1983 to 2011 and the Iranian Green Movement, when young Iranians once again take to the streets, set to make their own history.

In 1996, at the age of 12, Delijani and her family moved to Northern California. In 2002, she attended the University of California, Berkeley, earning a BA degree in Comparative Literature. Graduating in 2006, she moved to Turin, Italy where she lived for over 10 years. She now lives in New York City.

== Selected Works/Publications ==
Delijani’s writing has appeared in The New York Times, Literary Hub, Timothy McSweeney's Quarterly Concern, Kweli Jouranl, Bellevue Literary Review and internationally on Zeit Online, Corriere della Sera, La Nazione, BBC Persian, and DW Persian.

She is the recipient of the 2023 de Groot Foundation Courage to Write Grant, the 2023 Society of Authors and Author’s Foundation Grant, and of fellowships at Tin House, Art Omi, Hedgebrook and Monson Arts. Her work has furthermore been longlisted for the 2022 Granum Foundation Prize, and nominated several times for the Pushcart Prize and the Best American Essay Series.

Delijani has recently appeared on ABC News, Al Jazeera, BBC, NPR and Channel 4 News to discuss Iran and the political realities of the region following a viral post opposing the Israel-Iran war that garnered over four million views.
