= Sepideh Shamlou =

Iranian award-winner writer (born 1968)

Sepideh Shamlou (Persian: سپیده شاملو; born 1968) is an Iranian award-winner writer. She has written several novels in Persian. She was born in 1968 in Iran. She obtained a BS in English. Sepideh Shamlou started off writing film pieces, but with the release of It was as if you had said that Lily, she then became a novelist. She was among the many female authors who started writing in the 1990s onwards. Her novel titled As you had told Leyli was awarded a Hooshang Golshiri Literary Award for Best First Novel in 2000. She was interviewed by Haft magazine in 2006 on her novel. She was also interviewed by Etemaad newspaper in 2007.

== Books ==
- As you had told Leyli, 2011 (first published in 2000) (novel) ISBN 978-9-643-05496-0
- Your redness from me, 2006 (novel) ISBN 978-9-643-05873-9
- Red glove (collection of short stories)

== Awards and recognition ==
- 2000 Hooshang Golshiri Literary Awards, Best First Novel, As if You Had Said Leyli
- Sepideh Shamlou was a judge for the 7th Sadegh Hedayat Literary Award in 2009.

== Sources ==
- گفتگو با سپیده شاملو
