= Fariba Vafi =

Iranian Azerbaijani writer (born 1963)

- فریبا وفی
- Born: 21 January 1963 (age 63); Tabriz, Imperial State of Iran
- Occupation: Author
- Writing career
- Genre: Fiction
- Notable work: Parandeye Man [My Bird] (2002)
- Notable awards: Gholsihiri Year Book Award, LiBeratur Prize
- Website: www.faribavafi.com

Fariba Vafi (Persian: فریبا وفی; born 21 January 1963 in Tabriz) is an Iranian novelist and short story writer. She began writing in her teenage years. Her literary career includes eight novels and five short story collections. With her minimalist yet poetically rich language, Vafi is regarded as one of the most innovative voices in contemporary Persian literature.

== Biography ==
With her minimalist yet poetically rich language, Vafi is regarded as one of the most innovative voices in contemporary Persian literature. Fariba Vafi was born in Tabriz in 1963. She began writing as a teenager, and her early short stories were published in literary magazines during the 1980s, including Adineh and Donyaye Sokhan. She has published eight novels and five short story collections. Her works have been published by Nashr Markaz and Cheshmeh Publishing House. Her works have been widely acclaimed by readers and critics and have gone through multiple printings. Her latest novel, People from a Previous Life, was published in 2025 by Cheshmeh Publishing.

Her novel My Bird (2002) won awards including the Golshiri and Yalda prizes, and was also recognized by the Mehregan-e-Adab Award and the Isfahan Literary Prize. It has reached its 39th edition.

Her novel Dream of Tibet (2005) won the Hooshang Golshiri Literary Award for Best Novel and received a commendation from the Mehregan-e-Adab Prize.

Her short story collection Without Wind, Without Oars won the first Ahmad Mahmoud Prize.

Her novel Tarlan (2003) received the LiBeraturpreis in Germany in 2017.

Vafi's works have been translated into many languages, including English, French, Italian, Spanish, Turkish, Kurdish, Georgian, Norwegian, German (five books), Armenian, and Arabic.

She is a member of the Iranian Writers' Association and PEN Zentrum Deutschland.

In 2020, Vafi received the DAAD Artists-in-Berlin Program fellowship, which brought her to Germany. She now lives in Berlin.

== Works ==
- 1986: Dar Omq-e-sahneh (In Depth of the Stage), short story collection, Cheshmeh Publishers
- 1999: Hatta Vaqti Mikhandidim (Even When We Were Laughing), short story collection
- 2002: Parande-ye-man (My Bird), novel
- 2006: Tarlan, novel
- 2007: Rowya-ye-Tabbat (Dream of Tibet), novel,
- 2008: Razi dar Kucheha (A Mystery at Alleys), novel
- 2009: " Dar Rahe Vila " (On the Way to the Vila ), short story collection
- 2011: Hame-ye Ofoq (All the Horizon), short story collection
- 2012: Mah Kamel Mishavad (The Moon is Getting Full), novel
- 2014: Baad az Payan ( After the end ), novel
- 2016: Bi Baad Bi Parou ( without Wind Without Oars ), short story collection
- 2020: Rooz-e Digare Shoura (Another Day for Shoura), novel
- 2025: Adamhā-ye Zendegi-ye Qabli (People from Previous Life), novel
