= Nazi Safavi =

Iranian novelist

Nazi Safavi (born 1967, in Tehran, Iran), is an Iranian writer. Her novels mostly concern women battling tradition and modernity in Iranian society. She is known for her novel Hallway to Paradise, which is a bestseller in Iran.

== Publications/Books ==
- Hallway to Paradise (دالان بهشت), was published in 1999. In 2011, on the occasion of the 40th printing, fellow writer Yousef Alikhani praised the book as one of the best novels he had ever read. Hallway to Paradise has sold more than 250,000 copies and been reprinted 47 times. ISBN 978-6-008-25056-2
- Purgatory, Yet Heaven (برزخ اما بهشت), was published in 2005.
- Barzakh Amma Behesht Nazi Safavi ISBN 978-9-643-11213-4
- Nazi, Safavi (2010). Da¯la¯n-i bihisht (Da¯sta¯n-i I¯ra¯ni¯). Intisha¯ra¯t-i Quqnu¯s. ISBN 978-9-643-11213-4. (in Persian), co-authored with نازی صفوی
- Cennet Koridoru (Turkish Edition)
- In 2020 she published Isthmus but Paradise.

== External links/References ==
- Books From Iran: Corridor of Paradise book
- Nazi Safavi's List of published books
- Dalan behesht
