= List of Iranian and Persian short story writers =

This is a list of short story Iranian writers either born in Iran or holding Iranian citizenship, also Non-Iranian Persian short story writers and short story writers of Iranian descent.

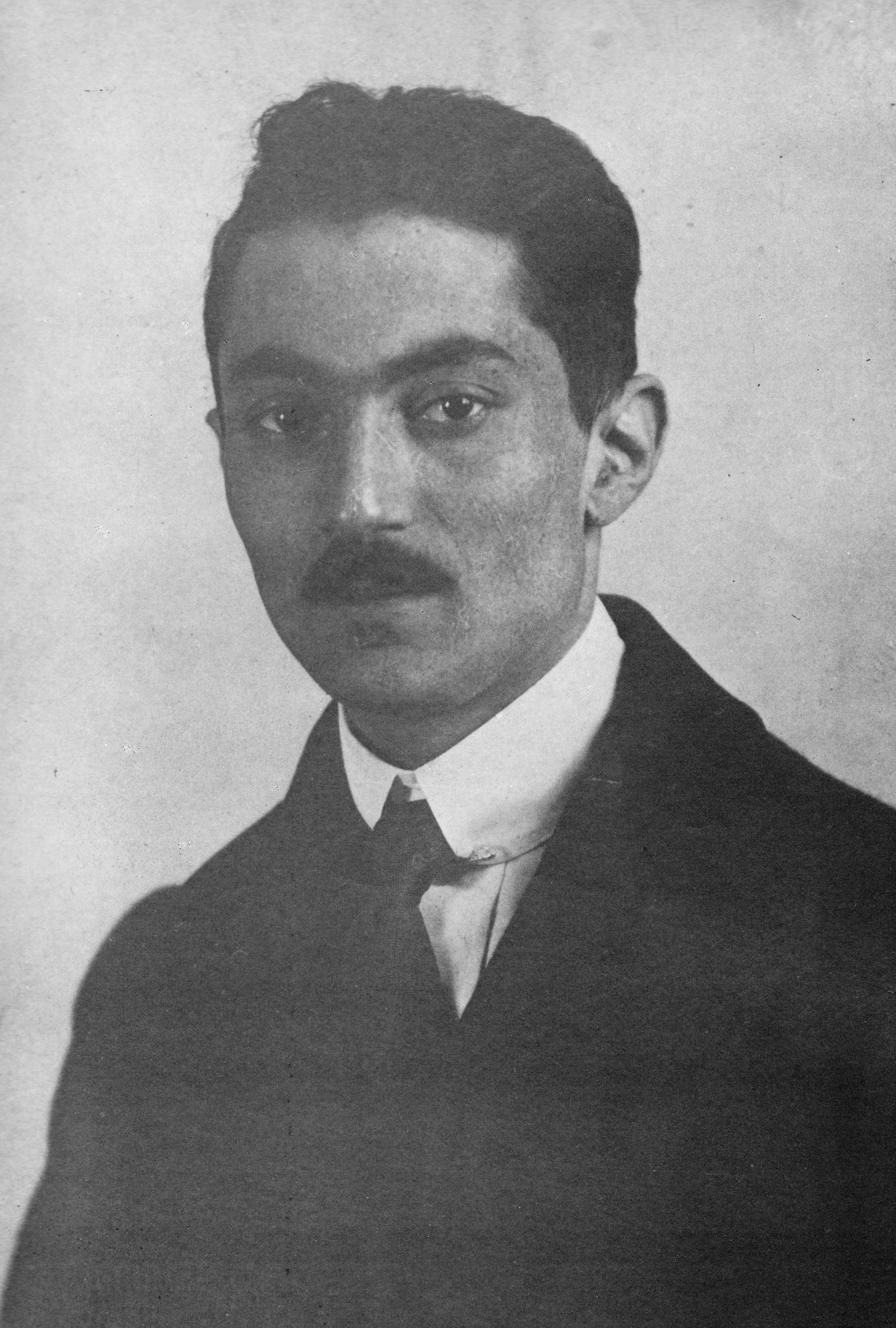
Mohammad ali Jamal-Zadeh

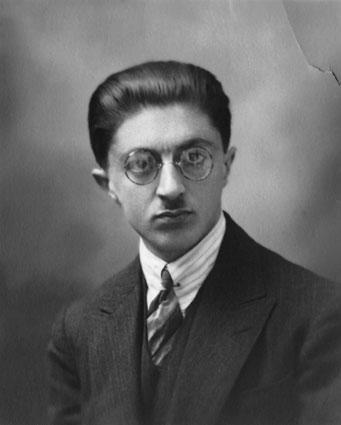
Sadegh Hedayat

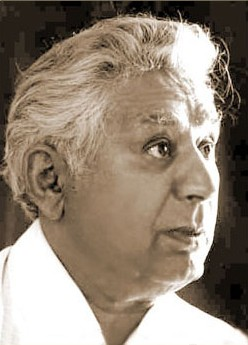
Bozorg Alavi

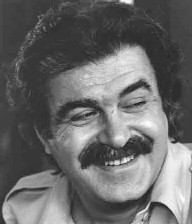
Hossein Sa'edi

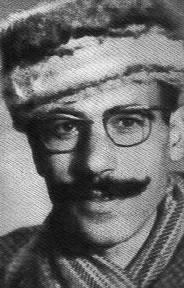
Samad Behrangi

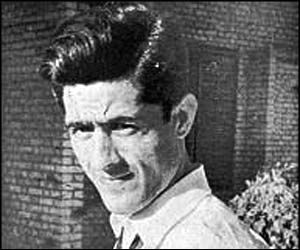
Jalal Al-e-Ahmad

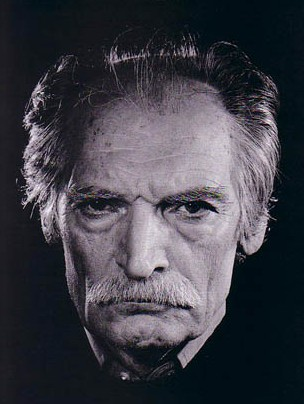
Mahmoud Dowlat Abadi

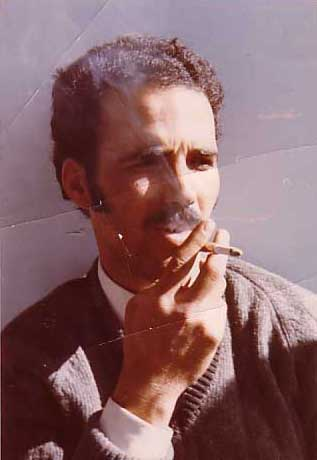
Houshang Golshiri

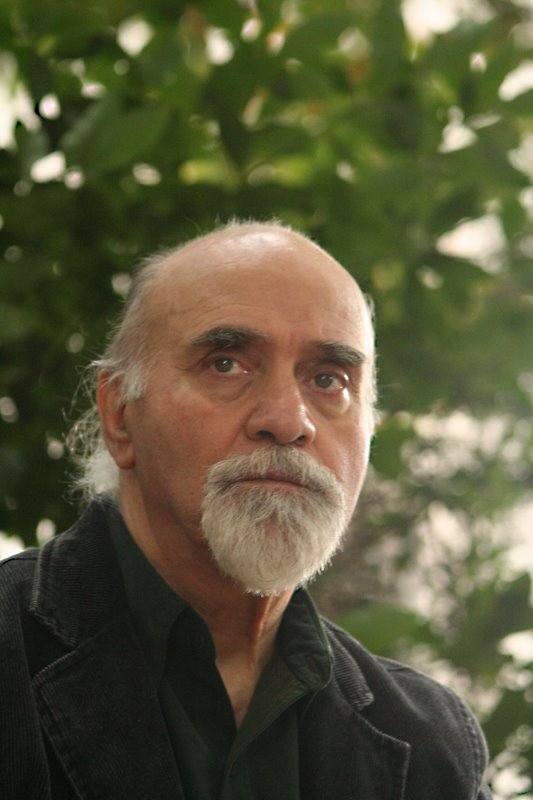
Reza Baraheni

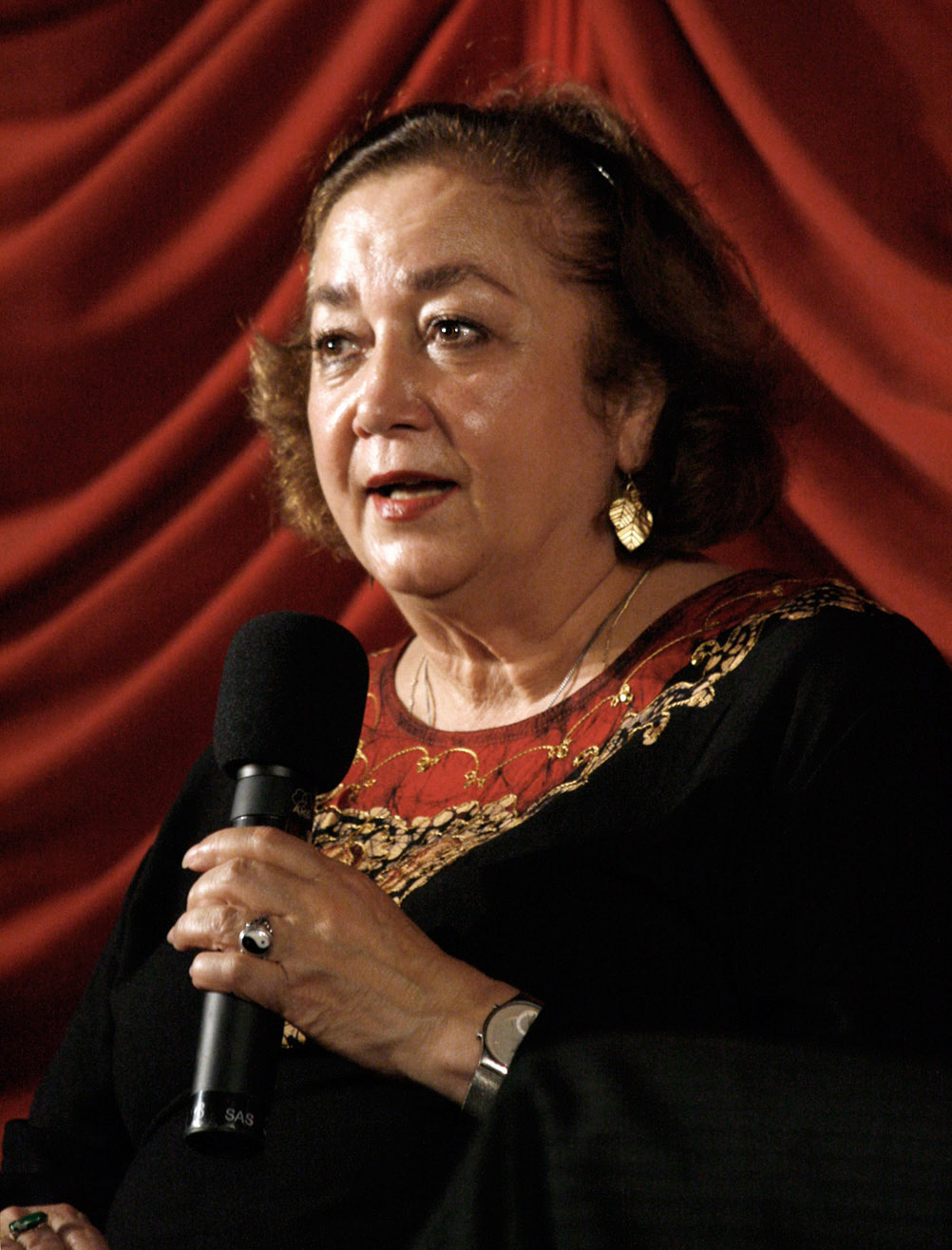
Shahrnush Parsipur

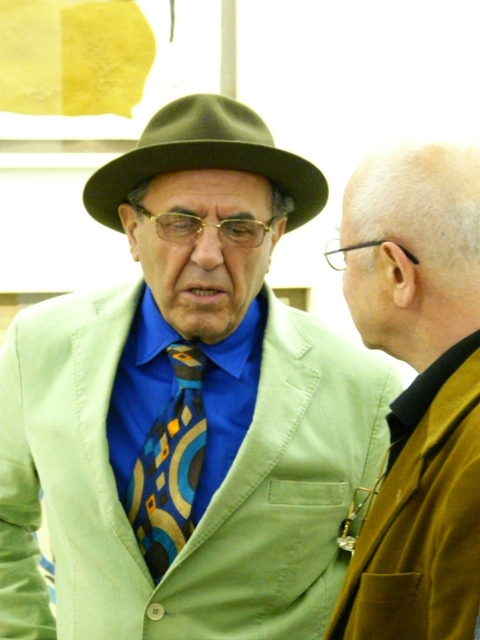
Javad Mojabi

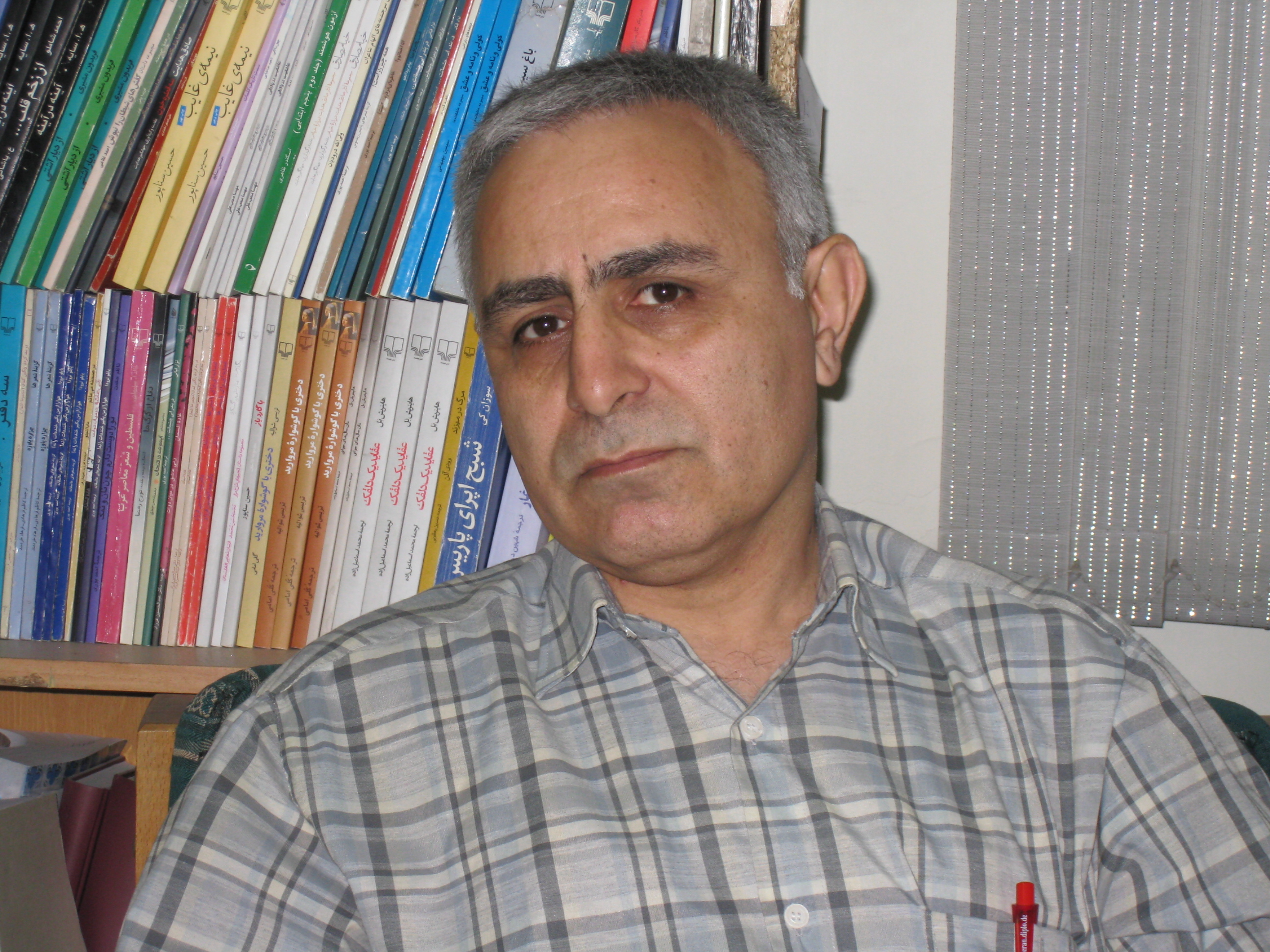
Hossein Sanapour

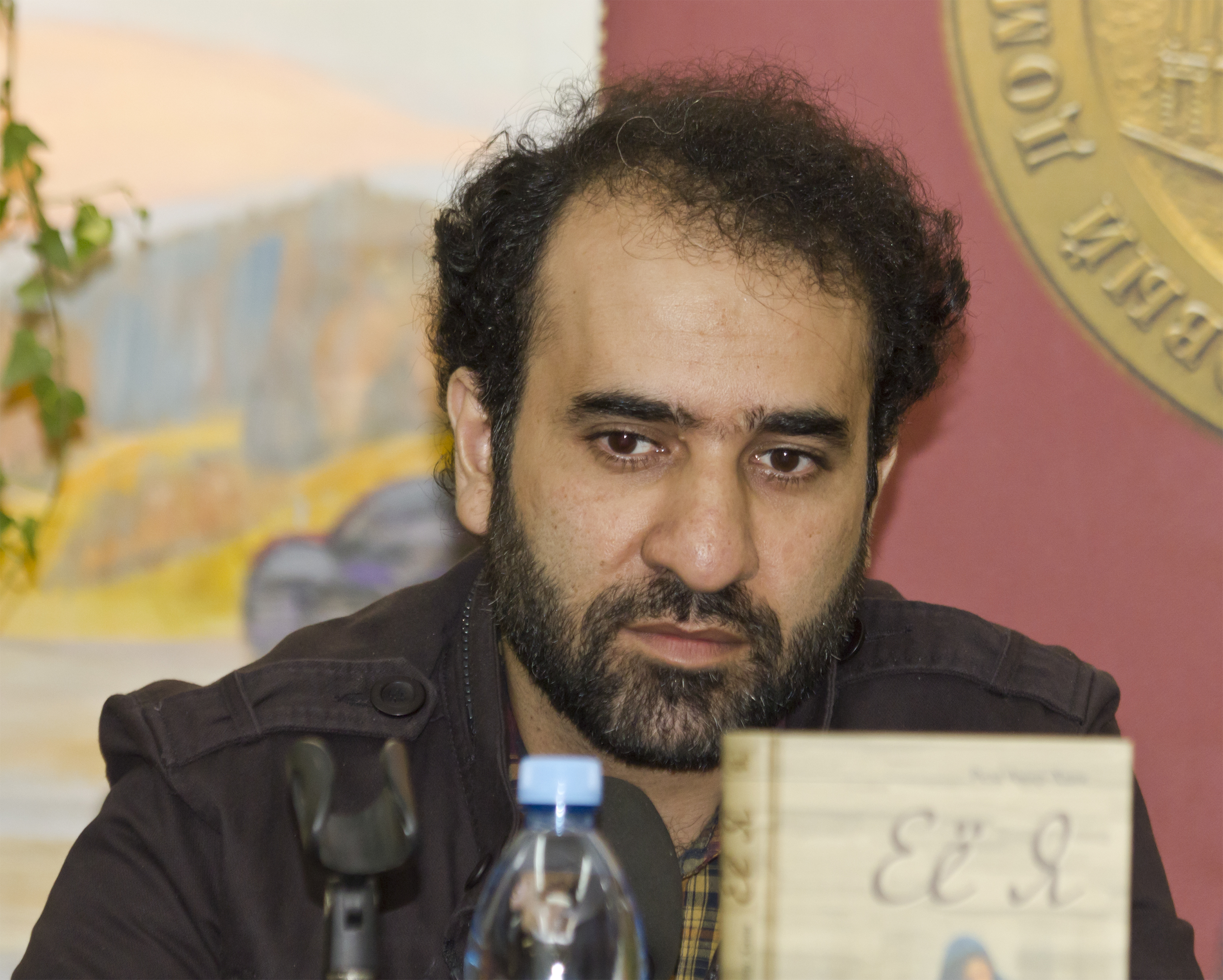
Reza Amir-Khani

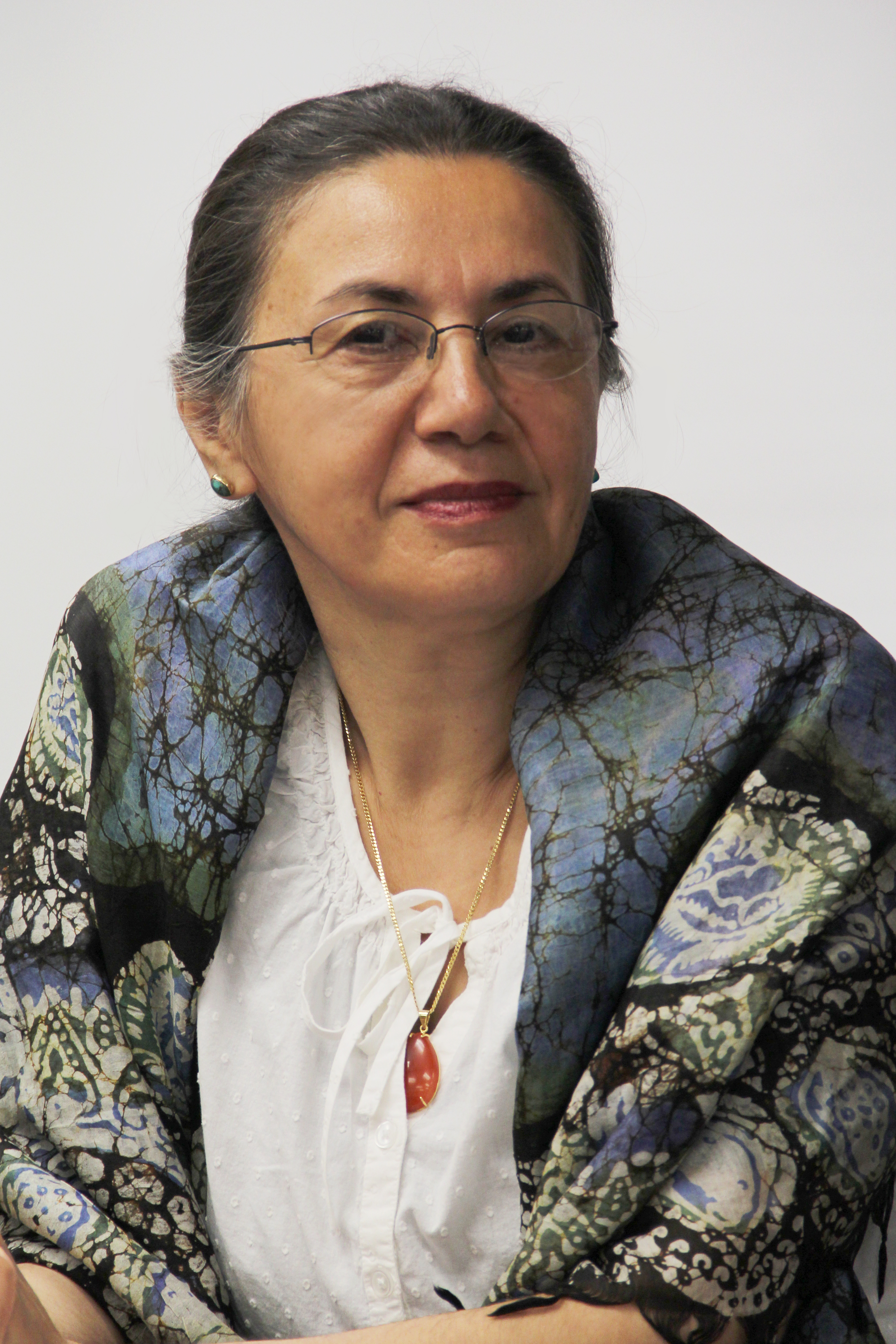
Fereshteh Molavi

== A ==
- Bozorg Alavi
- Ghazaleh Alizadeh
- Ahmad Akbarpur
- Mehdi Akhavan-Sales : Persian poet, also wrote some stories
- Jalal Al-e-Ahmad
- Ali Ashraf Darvishian
- Yosuf Ali-Khani
- Mahshid Amir-Shahi
- Salar Abdoh
- Habib Ahmad-Zadeh
- Reza Allameh-Zadeh
- Noushin Ahmadi Khorasani : journalist, women's rights activist, also wrote short stories
- Ali Mohammad Afghani
- Reza Amirkhani

== B ==
- Reza Baraheni
- Samad Behrangi

== C ==
- Sadeq Chubak

== D ==
- Simin Daneshvar
- Mahmoud Dowlat Abadi

== E ==
- Mahmoud Etemadzadeh

== F ==
- Bahman Forsi
- Pooran Farrokhzad

== G ==
- Ibrahim Golistan
- Houshang Golshiri
- Houshang Gol-Makani

== H ==
- Sadeq Hedayat
- Mohammad Hijazi

== I ==
- Nader Ibrahimi

== J ==
- Mohammad ali Jamal-Zadeh
- Sepideh Jodeyri, poet, translator and journalist also published a short story collection
- Parviz Jahani

== K ==
- Nasim Khaksar
- Kamshad Kooshan : is an Iranian-American Movie Writer and Director, also wrote short story.
- Hakob Karapents

== M ==
- Bahman Motamedian
- Mostafa Mastoor
- Ahmad Mahmoud
- Abbas Maroufi
- Shokooh Mirzadegi
- Jaafar Modarres-Sadeghi
- Fereshteh Molavi
- Houshang Moradi Kermani
- Jamal Mir-Sadeghi
- Aziz Mo'tazedi
- Mahshid Moshiri
- Javad Mujabi
- Shahriar Mandanipour

== N ==
- Bijan Najdi
- Ata Nahaei
- Saeed Nafisi

== P ==
- Shahrnush Parsipur
- Iraj Pezashk-Zad
- Zoya Pirzad
- Parween Pazhwak

== R ==
- Muniro Ravanipur
- Fozia Rahgozar
- Atiq Rahimi

== S ==
- Hossein Sanapour
- Mahasti Shahrokhi
- Gholam-Hossein Sa'edi
- Asef Soltanzadeh
- Ahmad Shamloo : Persian poet, also wrote short stories
- Sana Safi
- Sepideh Shamlou

== T ==
- Mohammad Tolouei
- Shabnam Tolouei
- Goli Taraghi

== V ==
- Fariba Vafi

== Y ==
- Mehri Yalfani

== Z ==
- Gol-Mohammad Zhowandai

== See also ==
- Persian literature
- List of Iranian writers
- List of Persian-language poets and authors
