= Persian literature =

Written texts in the Persian language

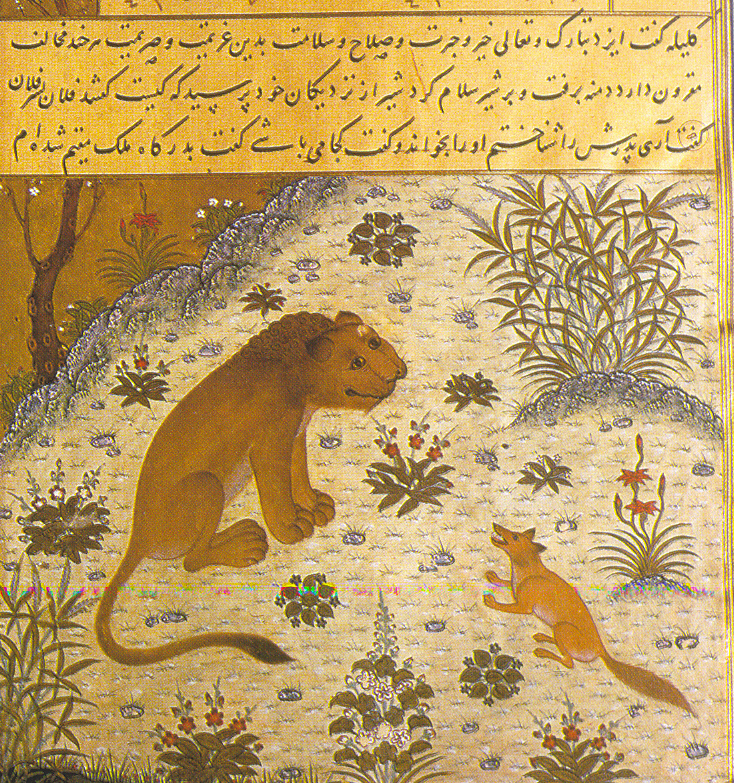
Kelileh va Demneh Persian manuscript copy dated 1429, depicts the Jackal trying to lead the Lion astray. Topkapi Palace Museum in Istanbul, Turkey.

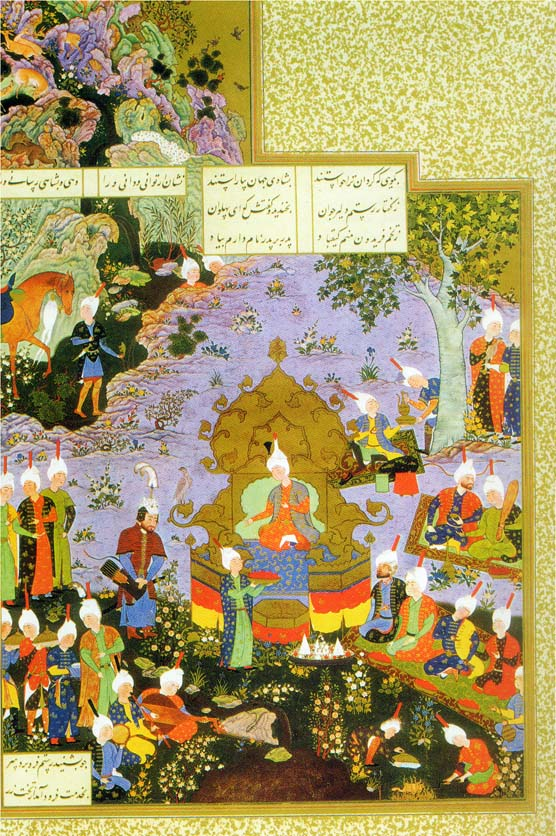
A scene from the Shahnameh describing the valour of Rustam

Persian literature (Note: Persian: ادبیات فارسی, romanized: Adabiyâte fârsi, pronounced [ædæbiːˌjɒːte fɒːɾˈsiː]) comprises written texts in the Persian language and is one of the world's oldest literatures. It spans over two-and-a-half millennia. Its sources have been within regions where the Persian language has historically been either the native or official language (cf. Greater Iran).

For example, Rumi, one of the best-loved Persian poets, born in Balkh (in modern-day Afghanistan) or Wakhsh (in modern-day Tajikistan), wrote in Persian and lived in Konya (in modern-day Turkey), at that time the capital of the Seljuks in Anatolia. The Ghaznavids conquered large territories in Central and South Asia and adopted Persian as their court language. There is thus Persian literature from Iran, Azerbaijan, Kurdistan, Afghanistan, Pakistan, India, the wider Caucasus, Turkey, Bangladesh, Tajikistan and other parts of Central Asia, as well as the Balkans. Not all Persian literature is written in Persian, as some consider works written by ethnic Persians or Iranians in other languages, such as Greek and Arabic, to be included.

At the same time, not all literature written in Persian is written by ethnic Persians or Iranians, as Turkic, Caucasian, Indian and Slavic poets and writers have also used the Persian language in the environment of Persianate cultures.

Described as one of the great literatures of humanity, including Goethe's assessment of it as one of the four main bodies of world literature, Persian literature has its roots in surviving works of Middle Persian and Old Persian, the latter of which dates back as far as 522 BCE, the date of the earliest surviving Achaemenid inscription, the Behistun Inscription. The bulk of surviving Persian literature, however, comes from the times following the Muslim conquest of Persia c. 650 CE. After the Abbasids came to power (750 CE), some Persians became prominent scribes and bureaucrats of the Islamic Caliphate and, increasingly, writers and poets.

The Persian Intermezzo was a period of Persian cultural and literary revival following the Arab conquest of Persia. From the 9th to 11th centuries, this revival was driven largely by dynasties based in Khorasan and Transoxiana, particularly the Samanids, Saffarids, and Ghaznavids. As a result, New Persian literature developed primarily outside the borders of modern Iran, in what is today Afghanistan, Uzbekistan, and Tajikistan. Its earliest literary form, Dari, emerged in the late Sasanian period and developed further under the aforementioned dynasties.

While New Persian was widely adopted and flourished in Khorasan, modern-day Iran remained linguistically fragmented, with regional languages and dialects such as Middle Persian descendants, Kurdish, Arabic, and other Iranian languages spoken. In the 11th century, the Seljuk conquests helped spread New Persian westward to modern-day Iran, where it increasingly became a language of administration, literature, and communication.

Hanzala Badghisi (9th century CE), a poet from Badghis, in present-day Afghanistan, is considered the earliest known Persian poet for whom we have a historical record. Additionally, Persian-speaking poets such as Ferdowsi, Saadi, Hafez, Attar, Nizami, Rumi and Omar Khayyam are also known in the West and have influenced the literature of many countries.

== Classical Persian literature ==
=== Pre-Islamic Persian literature ===
Very few literary works of Achaemenid Iran have survived, partly due to the destruction of the library at Persepolis. Most of what remains consists of the royal inscriptions of Achaemenid kings, particularly Darius I (522–486 BC) and his son Xerxes. The Parsis who fled to India took with them some of the books of the Zoroastrian canon, including some of the Avesta and ancient commentaries (Zend) thereof. Some works of Sassanid geography and travel also survived, albeit in Arabic translations.

No single text devoted to literary criticism has survived from pre-Islamic Iran. However, some essays in Pahlavi, such as "Ayin-e name nebeshtan" (Principles of Writing Book) and "Bab-e edteda’I-ye" (Kalileh o Demneh), have been considered as literary criticism.

Claims regarding the existence of pre-Islamic books on eloquence, such as the 'Karvand', are primarily based on the assertions of the Shu'ubiyya movement, though no physical trace of such works remains. There are some indications that some among the Persian nobility were familiar with Greek rhetoric and literary criticism (Zarrinkoub, 1947).

=== Persian literature of the medieval and pre-modern periods ===
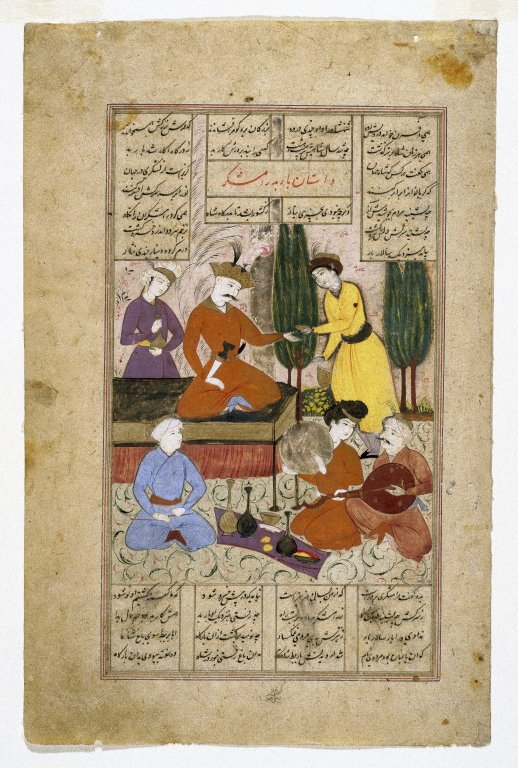
Bahram Gur and Courtiers Entertained by Barbad the Musician, Page from a manuscript of the Shahnama of Ferdowsi. Brooklyn Museum.

While initially overshadowed by Arabic during the Umayyad and early Abbasid caliphates, New Persian soon became a literary language again of the Central Asian and West Asian lands. The rebirth of the language in its new form is often accredited to Ferdowsi, Unsuri, Daqiqi, Rudaki, and their generation, as they used pre-Islamic nationalism as a conduit to revive the language and customs of ancient Iran.

==== Poetry ====
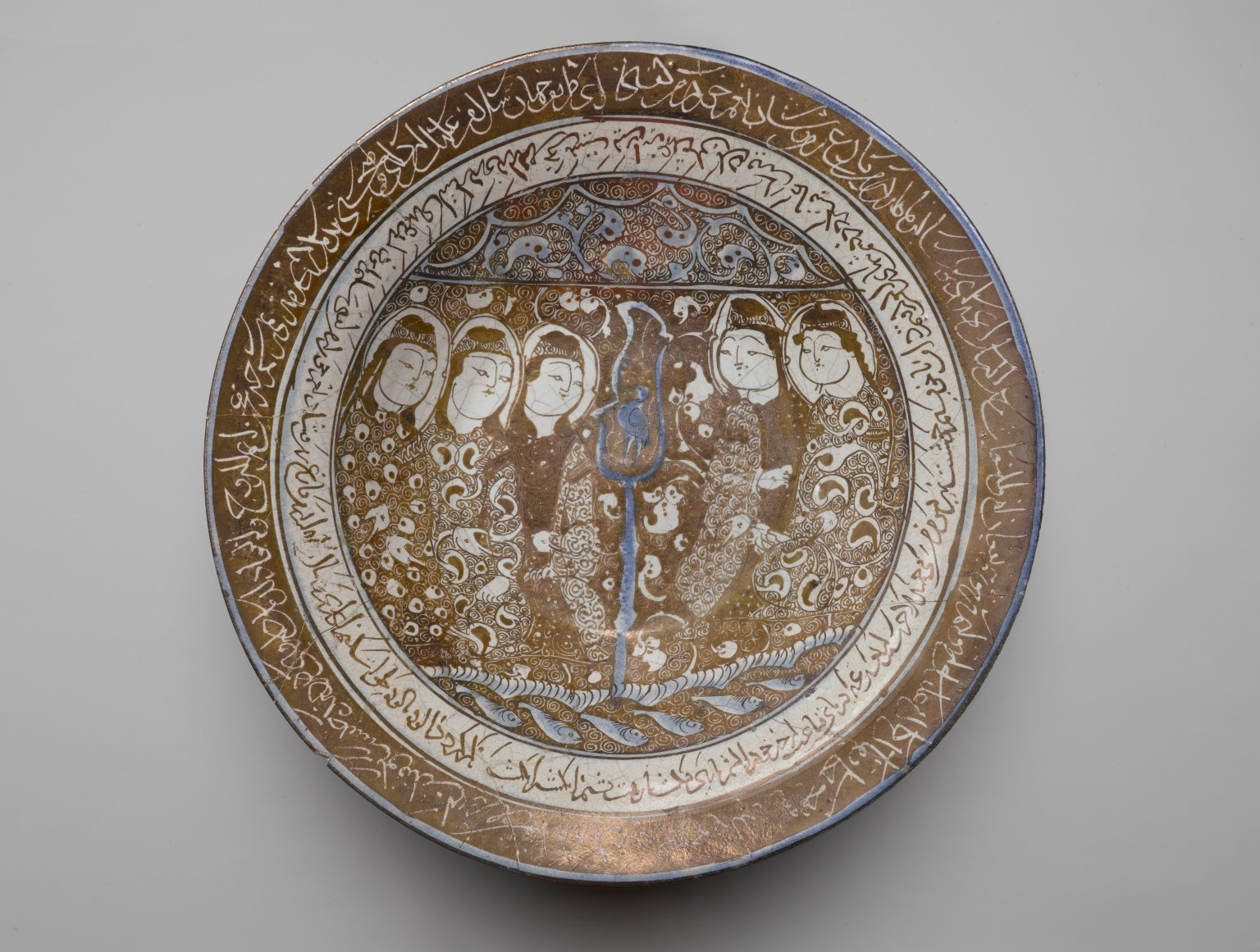
Bowl of Reflections, early 13th century. Brooklyn Museum

Poetry was frequently integrated into classical Persian works across various disciplines, including science and metaphysics. Writing in verse was a common practice among many scholars. For example, it is claimed that almost half of Avicenna's medical writings are in verse.

Works of the early era of Persian poetry are characterized by strong court patronage, panegyrics, and what is known as سبک فاخر "exalted in style". The tradition of royal patronage is claimed to have begun under the Sassanid era and carried over through the Abbasid and Samanid courts into every major Iranian dynasty. The Qasida was the most famous form of panegyric used, though quatrains such as those in Omar Khayyam's Ruba'iyyat are also widely popular.

The Khorasani style, whose followers mostly were associated with Greater Khorasan, is characterized by its elevated diction, dignified tone, and literate language. The chief representatives of this lyricism are Asjadi, Farrukhi Sistani, Unsuri, and Manuchehri. Panegyric masters such as Rudaki were known for their love of nature, their verses abounding with evocative descriptions.

Through these courts and system of patronage emerged the epic style of poetry, with Ferdowsi's Shahnama at the apex. By glorifying the Iranian historical past in heroic verses, he and other notables such as Daqiqi and Asadi Tusi created works that heavily influenced Iranian cultural identity. Ferdowsi set a model to be followed by a host of other poets later on.

The 13th century marks the ascendancy of lyric poetry with the consequent development of the ghazal into a major verse form, as well as the rise of mystical and Sufi poetry. This style is often called Araqi (Iraqi) style (Araq-e-Ajam) and is known by its emotional lyric qualities, rich meters, and the relative simplicity of its language. Emotional romantic poetry was not something new, however, as works such as Vis o Ramin by As'ad Gorgani, and Yusof o Zoleikha by Am'aq Bokharai exemplify. Poets such as Sana'i and Attar (who ostensibly inspired Rumi), Khaqani Shirvani, Anvari, and Nizami, were highly respected ghazal writers. However, the most prominent masters of this school are Rumi, Saadi, and Hafiz Shirazi.

Regarding the tradition of Persian love poetry during the Safavid era, Persian historian Ehsan Yarshater notes, "As a rule, the beloved is not a woman, but a young man. In the early centuries of Islam, the raids into Central Asia produced many young slaves. Slaves were also bought or received as gifts. They were made to serve as pages at court or in the households of the affluent, or as soldiers and bodyguards. Young men, slaves or not, also, served wine at banquets and receptions, and the more gifted among them could play music and maintain a cultivated conversation. It was love toward young pages, soldiers, or novices in trades and professions which was the subject of lyrical introductions to panegyrics from the beginning of Persian poetry, and of the ghazal. " During the same Safavid era, many subjects of the Iranian Safavids were patrons of Persian poetry, such as Teimuraz I of Kakheti.

In the didactic genre, notable works include Sanai's Hadiqat-ul-Haqiqah (Garden of Truth) and Nizami's Makhzan-ul-Asrār (Treasury of Secrets). Some of Attar's and Rumi's works are also grouped in this genre, although they are sometimes classified as lyrical due to their mystical qualities. Two prominent examples of this genre are Saadi's Bustan and Gulistan.

After the 15th century, the Indian style of Persian poetry (sometimes also called Isfahani or Safavi styles) became prominent. This style has its roots in the Timurid era and produced poets such as Amir Khosrow Dehlavi and Bhai Nand Lal Goya.

==== Prose writings ====
Notable prose writings of this era include Nizami Arudhi Samarqandi's "Chahār Maqāleh" as well as Mohammad Aufi's anecdote compendium Jawami ul-Hikayat.

Shams al-Mo'ali Abol-hasan Ghaboos ibn Wushmgir's work, the Qabus nama (A Mirror for Princes), is a Belles-lettres work of Persian literature. Another notable work is the Siyasatnama, by the Persian vizier Nizam al-Mulk. Kelileh va Demneh, translated from Indian folk tales, is also mentioned in this category. It is seen as a collection of adages in Persian literary studies and thus does not convey folkloric notions.

==== Biographies, hagiographies, and historical works ====
Among the historical and biographical works in classical Persian are Abolfazl Beyhaghi's Tarikh-i Beyhaqi, Lubab ul-Albab of Zahiriddin Nasr Muhammad Aufi (which is sometimes regarded as a chronological source), as well as Ata-Malik Juvayni's Tarikh-i Jahangushay-i Juvaini (which spans the Mongolid and Ilkhanid era of Iran). Attar's Tazkerat-ol-Owliya ("Biographies of the Saints") is an account of Sufi mystics, which is referenced in mystical hagiography.

==== Literary criticism ====
The oldest surviving work of Persian literary criticism after the Islamic conquest of Persia is Muqaddame-ye Shahname-ye Abu Mansuri, which was written during the Samanid period. The work deals with the myths and legends of Shahnameh and is claimed to be the oldest surviving example of Persian prose. It also shows an attempt by the authors to evaluate literary works critically

==== Storytelling ====
One Thousand and One Nights (Persian: هزار و یک شب) is a medieval folk tale collection which tells the story of Scheherazade (Persian: شهرزاد Šahrzād), a Sassanid queen who must relate a series of stories to her malevolent husband, King Shahryar (Persian: شهریار Šahryār), to delay her execution. The stories are told over a period of one thousand and one nights, and every night she ends the story with a suspenseful situation, forcing the King to keep her alive for another day. The individual stories were created over several centuries, by many people from a number of different lands.

The nucleus of the collection is formed by a lost Pahlavi Sassanid Persian book called Hazār Afsānah (Persian: هزار افسان, Thousand Myths), which is believed to be a collection of ancient Indian and Persian folk tales.

During the reign of the Abbasid Caliph Harun al-Rashid in the 8th century, Baghdad had become an important cosmopolitan city. Merchants from Persia, China, India, Africa, and Europe were all found in Baghdad. During this time, many of the stories that were originally folk stories are thought to have been collected orally over many years and later compiled into a single book. The compiler and 9th-century translator into Arabic is reputedly the storyteller Abu Abd-Allah Muhammad al-Jahshiyari. The frame story of Shahrzad seems to have been added in the 14th century.

== Persian dictionaries ==
The biggest Persian dictionary is Dehkhoda Dictionary (16 volumes) by Ali-Akbar Dehkhoda. It is the largest comprehensive Persian dictionary ever published, comprising 16 volumes (more than 27,000 pages). It is published by the Tehran University Press (UTP) under the supervision of the Dehkhoda Dictionary Institute and was first published in 1931. It traces the historical development of the Persian language, providing a comprehensive resource to scholars and academic researchers, as well as describing usage in its many variations throughout the world. He names 200 Persian lexicographical works in his dictionary, the earliest, Farhang-i Oim (فرهنگ اویم) and Farhang-i Menakhtay (فرهنگ مناختای), from the late Sassanid era of the 3rd-7th century.

The most widely used Persian lexicons in the Middle Ages were those of Abu Hafs Sughdi (فرهنگ ابوحفص سغدی) and Asadi Tusi (فرهنگ لغت فرس), written in 1092.

The production of Persian dictionaries declined in Iran after the 14th century, while it simultaneously grew in the Indian subcontinent and Ottoman Turkey, regions that were increasingly becoming Persianized. Only 4 dictionaries of Persian were compiled in Iran between the 10th and 19th centuries, while more than 66 were produced in India. Significant dictionaries from India include the Farhang-e Ghavvas, Sharafnama-ye Ebrahimi, Farhang-i Jahangiri, and Burhan-i Qati. Unlike the Persian dictionaries of India, most dictionaries from Ottoman Turkey are bilingual (Persian-Turkish). Some significant dictionaries of the era are Oqnum-e Ajam, Loghat-e Ne'matallah, and Lesan al-Ajam.

In 1645, Christian Ravius completed a Persian-Latin dictionary, printed at Leiden. This was followed by John Richardson's two-volume Oxford edition (1777) and Gladwin-Malda's (1770) Persian-English Dictionaries, Scharif and S. Peters' Persian-Russian Dictionary (1869), and 30 other Persian lexicographical translations through the 1950s.

Currently, English-Persian dictionaries of Manouchehr Aryanpour and Soleiman Haim are widely used in Iran. Also highly regarded in the contemporary Persian literature lexical corpus are the works of Dr. Mohammad Moin. The first volume of Moin Dictionary was published in 1963.

== Influence ==
=== Sufi literature ===
Some prominent medieval Persian poets were Sufis, and their poetry has influenced Sufi traditions across the Muslim world. Rumi is recognized both as a poet and as the founder of a Sufi order. Hafez's work, which incorporated Sufi themes, has gained recognition in both Eastern and Western literary traditions. The themes and styles of this devotional poetry have been utilized by various Sufi and non-Sufi poets.

Notable prose texts in Persian mystic literature include Kimiya-yi sa'ādat, Asrar al-Tawhid, and Kashf ul Mahjoob.

=== Georgian literature ===
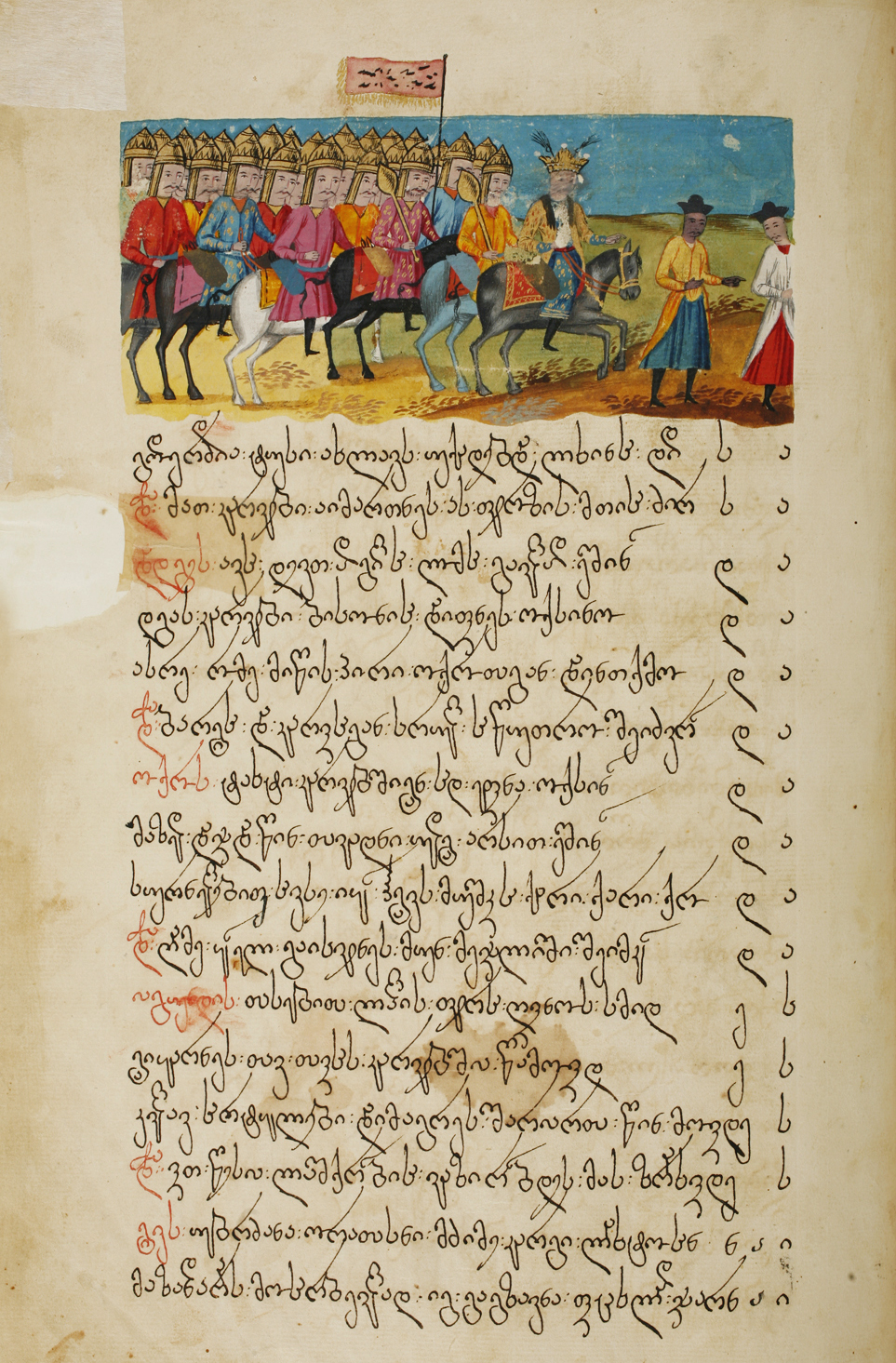
Georgian manuscript of Shahnameh written in the Georgian script

Beginning in the early 16th century, Persian traditions had a large impact on the Georgian ruling elites, which in turn resulted in Persian influence on Georgian art, architecture, and literature. This cultural influence lasted until the arrival of the Russians.

Jamshid Sh. Giunashvili remarks on the connection of Georgian culture with that of the Persian literary work Shahnameh:

The names of many Šāh-nāma heroes, such as Rostom-i, Thehmine, Sam-i, or Zaal-i, are found in 11th- and 12th-century Georgian literature. They are indirect evidence for an Old Georgian translation of the Šāh-nāma that is no longer extant. ...

The Šāh-nāma was translated, not only to satisfy the literary and aesthetic needs of readers and listeners, but also to inspire the young with the spirit of heroism and Georgian patriotism. Georgian ideology, customs, and worldview often informed these translations because they were oriented toward Georgian poetic culture. Conversely, Georgians consider these translations works of their native literature. Georgian versions of the Šāh-nāma are quite popular, and the stories of Rostam and Sohrāb, or Bījan and Maniža became part of Georgian folklore.

Farmanfarmaian in the Journal of Persianate Studies:

Distinguished scholars of Persian such as Gvakharia and Todua are well aware that the inspiration derived from the Persian classics of the ninth to the twelfth centuries produced a ‘cultural synthesis’ which saw, in the earliest stages of written secular literature in Georgia, the resumption of literary contacts with Iran, “much stronger than before” (Gvakharia, 2001, p. 481). Ferdowsi’s Shahnama was a never-ending source of inspiration, not only for high literature, but for folklore as well. “Almost every page of Georgian literary works and chronicles [...] contains names of Iranian heroes borrowed from the Shahnama” (ibid). Ferdowsi, together with Nezāmi, may have left the most enduring imprint on Georgian literature (...)

=== Asia Minor ===
Despite that Asia Minor (or Anatolia) had been ruled various times prior to the Middle Ages by various Persian-speaking dynasties originating in Iran, the language lost its traditional foothold there with the demise of the Sassanian Empire. Centuries later however, the practise and usage in the region would be strongly revived. A branch of the Seljuks, the Sultanate of Rum, took Persian language, art and letters to Anatolia. They adopted Persian language as the official language of the empire. The Ottomans, which can "roughly" be seen as their eventual successors, took this tradition over. Persian was the official court language of the empire, and for some time, the official language of the empire. The educated and noble class of the Ottoman Empire all spoke Persian, such as sultan Selim I, despite being Safavid Iran's archrival and a staunch opposer of Shia Islam. It was a major literary language in the empire. Some of the noted earlier Persian literature works during the Ottoman rule are Idris Bidlisi's Hasht Bihisht, which begun in 1502 and covered the reign of the first eight Ottoman rulers, and the Salim-Namah, a glorification of Selim I. After a period of several centuries, Ottoman Turkish (which was highly Persianised itself) had developed towards a fully accepted language of literature, which was even able to satisfy the demands of a scientific presentation. However, the number of Persian and Arabic loanwords contained in those works increased at times up to 88%. The Ottomans produced thousands of Persian literary works throughout their century long lifespan.

=== South Asia ===
With the emergence of the Ghaznavids and their successors such as the Ghurids, Timurids and Mughal Empire, Persian culture and its literature gradually moved into South Asia too. In general, from its earliest days, Persian literature and language was imported into the subcontinent by culturally Persianised Turkic and Afghan dynasties. Persian became the language of the nobility, literary circles, and the royal Mughal courts for hundreds of years. In the early 19th century, Hindustani replaced it.

Under the Mughal Empire during the 16th century, the official language of the Indian subcontinent became Persian. Only in 1832 did the British army force the South Asia to begin conducting business in English. (Clawson, p. 6) Persian poetry in fact flourished in these regions while post-Safavid Iranian literature stagnated. Dehkhoda and other scholars of the 20th century, for example, largely based their works on the detailed lexicography produced in India, using compilations such as Ghazi khan Badr Muhammad Dehlavi's Adat al-Fudhala (اداة الفضلا), Ibrahim Ghavamuddin Farughi's Farhang-i Ibrahimi (فرهنگ ابراهیمی), and particularly Muhammad Padshah's Farhang-i Anandraj (فرهنگ آنندراج).

=== Balkans ===
Persian learning was also widespread in the Ottoman-held Balkans (Rumelia), with a range of cities being famed for their long-standing traditions in the study of Persian and its classics, amongst them Saraybosna (modern Sarajevo, Bosnia and Herzegovina), Mostar (also in Bosnia and Herzegovina), and Vardar Yenicesi (or Yenice-i Vardar, now Giannitsa, in the northern part of Greece).

Vardar Yenicesi differed from other localities in the Balkans insofar as that it was a town where Persian was also widely spoken. However, the Persian of Vardar Yenicesi and throughout the rest of the Ottoman-held Balkans was different from formal Persian both in accent and vocabulary. The difference was apparent to such a degree that the Ottomans referred to it as "Rumelian Persian" (Rumili Farsisi). As learned people such as students, scholars and literati often frequented Vardar Yenicesi, it soon became the site of a flourishing Persianate linguistic and literary culture. The 16th-century Ottoman Aşık Çelebi (died 1572), who hailed from Prizren in modern-day Kosovo, was galvanized by the abundant Persian-speaking and Persian-writing communities of Vardar Yenicesi, and he referred to the city as a "hotbed of Persian".

Many Ottoman Persianists who established a career in the Ottoman capital of Constantinople (modern-day Istanbul) pursued early Persian training in Saraybosna, amongst them Ahmed Sudi.

=== Western literature ===
Persian literature was little known in the West before the 18th and 19th centuries. It became better known following the publication of several translations of medieval Persian poets, which influenced certain Western literary works.

==== German literature ====
- In 1819, Goethe published his West-östlicher Divan, a collection of lyric poems inspired by a German translation of Hafiz (1326–1390).
- The German philosopher Nietzsche, in his book Thus Spoke Zarathustra (1883–1885), utilized the figure of the ancient Persian prophet Zoroaster as a mouthpiece for his own philosophical ideas.

==== English literature ====
- A selection from Ferdowsi's Shahnameh (935–1020) was published in 1832 by James Atkinson. A portion of this abridgment was later adapted by the British poet Matthew Arnold in his 1853 Rustam and Sohrab.
- The American poet Ralph Waldo Emerson also expressed interest in Persian poetry, publishing several essays such as From the Persian of Hafiz and Ghaselle.

One of the widely read Persian poets in English is Omar Khayyam (1048–1123), whose Rubaiyat was freely translated (or paraphrased) by Edward Fitzgerald in 1859. While Khayyam is often recognized as a scientist in his native Persia, Fitzgerald's rendering made his verses frequently quoted in English.

The poet and mystic Rumi (1207–1273) has gained a significant following in the late 20th and early 21st centuries. Popularized versions by Coleman Barks—who worked from existing English translations rather than original Persian texts—have presented Rumi in a style often associated with New Age spirituality. More literal scholarly translations have been produced by figures such as A. J. Arberry.

Several classical Persian poets are now accessible in English through various translations, though many other works of Persian literature remain untranslated.

==== Swedish literature ====
During the last century, numerous works of classical Persian literature have been translated into Swedish by baron Eric Hermelin. He translated works by, among others, Farid al-Din Attar, Rumi, Ferdowsi, Omar Khayyam, Saadi and Sanai. Influenced by the writings of the Swedish mystic Emanuel Swedenborg, he was especially attracted to the religious or Sufi aspects of classical Persian poetry. His translations have had a great impact on numerous modern Swedish writers, among them Karl Wennberg, Willy Kyrklund and Gunnar Ekelöf. More recently classical authors such as Hafez, Rumi, Araqi and Nizami Aruzi have been rendered into Swedish by the Iranist Ashk Dahlén, who has published several essays on the development of Persian literature. Excerpts from Ferdowsi's Shahnameh has also been translated into Swedish prose by Namdar Nasser and Anja Malmberg.

==== Italian literature ====
During the last century, numerous works of classical and modern Persian literature have been translated into Italian by Alessandro Bausani (Nizami, Rumi, Iqbal, Khayyam), Carlo Saccone ('Attar, Sana'i, Hafiz, Nasir-i Khusraw, Nizami, Ahmad Ghazali, Ansari of Herat, Sa'di, Ayené), Angelo Piemontese (Amir Khusraw Dihlavi), Pio Filippani-Ronconi (Nasir-i Khusraw, Sa'di), Riccardo Zipoli (Kay Ka'us, Bidil), Maurizio Pistoso (Nizam al-Mulk), Giorgio Vercellin (Nizami 'Aruzi), Giovanni Maria D'Erme ('Ubayd Zakani, Hafiz), Sergio Foti (Suhrawardi, Rumi, Jami), Rita Bargigli (Sa'di, Farrukhi, Manuchehri, 'Unsuri), Nahid Norozi (Sohrab Sepehri, Khwaju of Kerman, Ahmad Shamlu), Faezeh Mardani (Forugh Farrokhzad, Abbas Kiarostami). A complete translation of Firdawsi's Shah-nama was made by Italo Pizzi in the 19th century.

== Contemporary Persian literature ==
=== History ===
In the 19th century, Persian literature experienced dramatic change and entered a new era. The beginning of this change was exemplified by an incident in the mid-19th century at the court of Nasereddin Shah, when the reform-minded prime minister, Amir Kabir, chastised the poet Habibollah Qa'ani Shirazi for "lying" in a panegyric qasida written in Kabir's honor. Kabir saw poetry in general and the type of poetry that had developed during the Qajar period as detrimental to "progress" and "modernization" in Iranian society, which he believed was in dire need of change. Such concerns were also expressed by others such as Fath-'Ali Akhundzadeh, Mirza Aqa Khan Kermani, and Mirza Malkom Khan. Khan also addressed a need for a change in Persian poetry in literary terms as well, always linking it to social concerns.

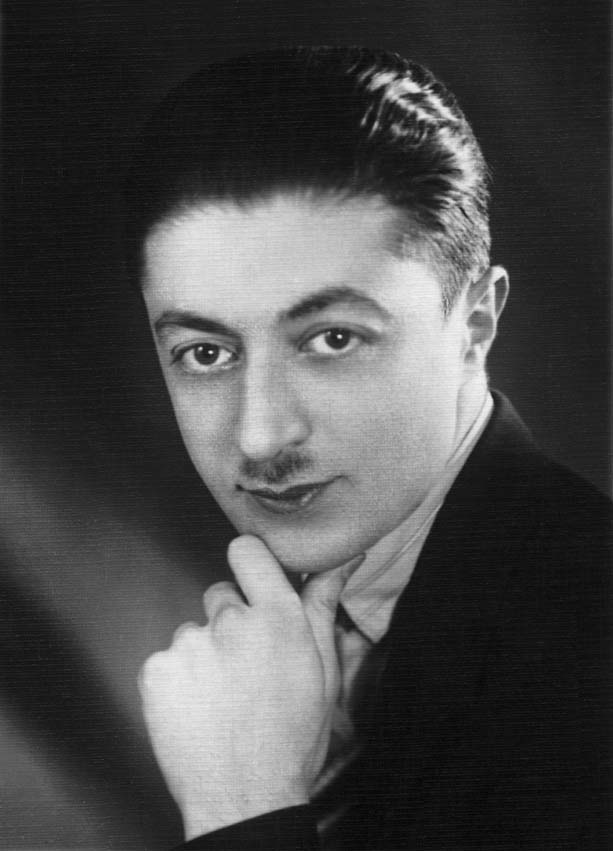
"In life there are certain sores which slowly erode the mind in solitude like a kind of canker." (The Blind Owl)

The new Persian literary movement cannot be understood without an understanding of the intellectual movements among Iranian philosophical circles. Given the social and political climate of Persia (Iran) in the late 19th and early 20th centuries, which led to the Persian Constitutional Revolution of 1906–1911, the idea that change in poetry was necessary became widespread. Many argued that Persian poetry should reflect the realities of a country in transition. This idea was propagated by notable literary figures such as Ali-Akbar Dehkhoda and Abolqasem Aref, who challenged the traditional system of Persian poetry in terms of introducing new content and experimentation with rhetoric, lexico-semantics, and structure. Dehkhoda, for instance, used a lesser-known traditional form, the mosammat, to elegize the execution of a revolutionary journalist. 'Aref employed the ghazal, "the most central genre within the lyrical tradition" (p. 88), to write his "Payam-e Azadi" (Message of Freedom).

Some researchers argue that the notion of "sociopolitical ramifications of esthaetic changes" led to the idea of poets "as social leaders trying the limits and possibilities of social change".

An important movement in modern Persian literature centered on the question of modernization and Westernization and whether these terms are synonymous when describing the evolution of Iranian society. It can be argued that almost all advocates of modernism in Persian literature, from Akhundzadeh, Kermani, and Malkom Khan to Dehkhoda, Aref, Bahar, and Taqi Rafat, were inspired by developments and changes that had occurred in Western, particularly European, literatures. Such inspirations did not mean blindly copying Western models but, rather, adapting aspects of Western literature and changing them to fit the needs of Iranian culture.

Following the pioneering works of Ahmad Kasravi, Sadeq Hedayat and many others, the Iranian wave of comparative literature and literary criticism reached a symbolic crest with the emergence of Abdolhossein Zarrinkoub, Shahrokh Meskoob, Houshang Golshiri and Ebrahim Golestan.

=== In Afghanistan ===
Persian literature in Afghanistan has also experienced a dramatic change during the last century. At the beginning of the 20th century, Afghanistan was confronted with economic and social change, which sparked a new approach to literature. In 1911, Mahmud Tarzi, who came back to Afghanistan after years of exile in Turkey and was influential in government circles, started a fortnightly publication named Saraj’ul Akhbar. Saraj was not the first such publication in the country, but in the field of journalism and literature it launched a new period of change and modernization. Saraj not only played an important role in journalism, it also gave new life to literature as a whole and opened the way for poetry to explore new avenues of expression through which personal thoughts took on a more social colour.

In 1930 (1309 AH), after months of cultural stagnation, a group of writers founded the Herat Literary Circle. A year later, another group calling itself the Kabul Literary Circle was founded in the capital. Both groups published regular magazines dedicated to culture and Persian literature. Both, especially the Kabul publication, had little success in becoming venues for modern Persian poetry and writing. In time, the Kabul publication turned into a stronghold for traditional writers and poets, and modernism in Dari literature was pushed to the fringes of social and cultural life.

Two of the most prominent classical poets in Afghanistan at the time were Abdul Haq Betab and Khalil Ullah Khalili. Betab received the honorary title Malek ul Shoara (King of Poets). Khalili was drawn toward the Khorasan style of poetry instead of the usual Hendi style. He was also interested in modern poetry and wrote a few poems in a more modern style with new aspects of thought and meaning. In 1318 (AH), after two poems by Nima Youshij titled "Gharab" and "Ghoghnus" were published, Khalili wrote a poem under the name "Sorude Kuhestan" or "The Song of the Mountain" in the same rhyming pattern as Nima and sent it to the Kabul Literary Circle. The traditionalists in Kabul refused to publish it because it was not written in the traditional rhyme. They criticized Khalili for modernizing his style.

Very gradually new styles found their way into literature and literary circles despite the efforts of traditionalists. The first book of new poems was published in the year 1957 (1336 AH), and in 1962 (1341 AH), a collection of modern Persian (Dari) poetry was published in Kabul. The first group to write poems in the new style consisted of Mahmud Farani, Baregh Shafi’i, Solayman Layeq, Sohail, Ayeneh and a few others. Later, Vasef Bakhtari, Assadullah Habib and Latif Nazemi, and others joined the group. Each had his own share in modernizing Persian poetry in Afghanistan. Other notable figures include Leila Sarahat Roshani, Sayed Elan Bahar, Parwin Pazwak, and Qahar Asi. Poets like Mayakovsky, Yase Nien and Lahouti (an Iranian poet living in exile in Russia) exerted a special influence on the Persian poets in Afghanistan. The influence of Iranians (e.g. Farrokhi Yazdi and Ahmad Shamlou) on the newly established Afghan prose and poetry, especially in the second half of the 20th century, must also be taken into consideration.

Prominent novelists and short story writers from Afghanistan include Akram Osman, known especially for Real Men Keep Their Word (مرداره قول اس), written in part in Kabuli dialect, and Rahnaward Zaryab. Some prominent writers from Afghanistan like Asef Soltanzadeh, Reza Ebrahimi, Ameneh Mohammadi, and Abbas Jafari grew up in Iran and were influenced by Iranian writers and teachers.

=== In Tajikistan ===
The new poetry in Tajikistan is mostly concerned with the way of life of people and is revolutionary. From the 1950s until the advent of new poetry in France, Asia and Latin America, the impact of the modernization drive was strong. In the 1960s, modern Iranian poetry and that of Mohammad Iqbal Lahouri made a profound impression in Tajik poetry. This period is probably the richest and most prolific period for the development of themes and forms in Persian poetry in Tajikistan. Some Tajik poets were mere imitators, and one can easily see the traits of foreign poets in their work. Only two or three poets were able to digest the foreign poetry and compose original poetry. In Tajikistan, the format and pictorial aspects of short stories and novels were taken from Russian and other European literature. Some of Tajikistan's prominent names in Persian literature are Golrokhsar Safi Eva, Mo'men Ghena'at, Farzaneh Khojandi, Bozor Sobir, and Lāyiq Shēralī.

=== Play ===
Among the best-known playwrights are:

- Bahram Beyzai
- Akbar Radi
- Gholam-Hossein Sa'edi
- Esmaeel Khalaj
- Ali Nassirian
- Mirza Aqa Tabrizi
- Bijan Mofid

=== Novel ===
Well-known novelists include:

- Mohammad-Ali Jamalzadeh
- Sadeq Hedayat
- Sadeq Chubak
- Gholam-Hossein Sa'edi
- Ahmad Mahmoud
- Jalal Al-e-Ahmad
- Simin Daneshvar
- Bozorg Alavi
- Ebrahim Golestan
- Bahman Sholevar
- Mahmoud Dowlatabadi
- Bahram Sadeghi
- Ghazaleh Alizadeh
- Bahman Forsi
- Houshang Golshiri
- Reza Baraheni
- Abbas Maroufi
- Reza Ghassemi
- Zoya Pirzad
- Shahriyar Mandanipour
- Abutorab Khosravi
- Nazi Safavi

=== Satire ===
- Dehkhoda
- Iraj Mirza
- Kioumars Saberi Foumani
- Obeid Zakani
- Ebrahim Nabavi
- Hadi Khorsandi
- Bibi Khatoon Astarabadi
- Javad Alizadeh
- Emran Salahi

=== Literary criticism ===
Pioneers of Persian literary criticism in 19th century include Mirza Fath `Ali Akhundzade, Mirza Malkom Khan, Mirza `Abd al-Rahim Talebof and Zeyn al-`Abedin Maraghe`i.

Prominent 20th century critics include:

- Jamshid Behnam
- Allameh Dehkhoda
- Zana Lorestani
- Badiozzaman Forouzanfar
- Mohammad-Taqi Bahar
- Jalal Homaei
- Mohammad Moin
- Saeed Nafisi
- Parviz Natel-Khanlari
- Sadeq Hedayat
- Ahmad Kasravi.
- Abdolhossein Zarrinkoub
- Shahrokh Meskoob
- Ali Abdolrezaei

Saeed Nafisi analyzed and edited several critical works. He is well known for his works on Rudaki and Sufi literature. Parviz Natel-Khanlari and Gholamhossein Yousefi, who belong to Nafisi's generation, were also involved in modern literature and critical writings. Natel-Khanlari is distinguished by the simplicity of his style. He did not follow the traditionalists, nor did he advocate the new. Instead, his approach accommodated the entire spectrum of creativity and expression in Persian literature. Another critic, Ahmad Kasravi, an experienced authority on literature, attacked the writers and poets whose works served despotism.

Contemporary Persian literary criticism reached its maturity after Sadeq Hedayat, Ebrahim Golestan, Houshang Golshiri, Abdolhossein Zarrinkoub and Shahrokh Meskoob. Among these figures, Zarrinkoub held academic positions and had a reputation not only among the intelligentsia but also in academia. Besides his significant contribution to the maturity of Persian language and literature, Zarrinkoub boosted comparative literature and Persian literary criticism. Zarrinkoub's Serr e Ney is a critical and comparative analysis of Rumi's Masnavi. In turn, Shahrokh Meskoob worked on Ferdowsi's Shahnameh, using the principles of modern literary criticism.

Mohammad Taghi Bahar's main contribution to this field is his book called Sabk Shenasi (Stylistics). It is a pioneering work on the practice of Persian literary historiography and the emergence and development of Persian literature as a distinct institution in the early part of the 20th century. It contends that the exemplary status of Sabk-shinasi rests on the recognition of its disciplinary or institutional achievements. It further contends that, rather than a text on Persian ‘stylistics’, Sabk-shinasi is a vast history of Persian literary prose, and, as such, is a significant intervention in Persian literary historiography.

Jalal Homaei, Badiozzaman Forouzanfar and his student, Mohammad Reza Shafiei-Kadkani, are other notable figures who have edited a number of prominent literary works.

Critical analysis of Jami's works has been carried out by Ala Khan Afsahzad. His classic book won the prestigious award of Iran's Year Best book in the year 2000.

=== Persian short stories ===
Historically, the modern Persian short story has undergone three stages of development: a formative period, a period of consolidation and growth, and a period of diversity.

==== Period of diversity ====
In this period, the influence of the western literature on the Iranian writers and authors is obvious. The new and modern approaches to writing is introduced and several genres have developed specially in the field of short story. The most popular trends are toward post-modern methods and speculative fiction.

=== Poetry ===
Notable Persian poets, modern and classical, include Mehdi Akhavan-Sales, Simin Behbahani, Forough Farrokhzad, Mohammad Zohari, Bijan Jalali, Mina Assadi, Siavash Kasraie, Fereydoon Moshiri, Nader Naderpour, Sohrab Sepehri, Mohammad-Reza Shafiei-Kadkani, Ahmad Shamlou, Nima Yushij, Houshang Ebtehaj, Mirzadeh Eshghi (classical), Mohammad Taghi Bahar (classical), Aref Ghazvini (classical), Ahmad NikTalab (new classic), Parvin Etesami (classical), Shahriar (classical) and, Ali Abdolrezaei (Post Modernism and New Post Modernism), Babak NikTalab (Children's poetry).

==== Classical Persian poetry in modern times ====
A few notable classical poets have arisen since the 19th century, among whom Mohammad Taghi Bahar and Parvin Etesami have been most celebrated. Mohammad Taghi Bahar had the title "king of poets" and had a significant role in the emergence and development of Persian literature as a distinct institution in the early part of the 20th century. The theme of his poems was the social and political situation of Iran.

Parvin Etesami may be called the greatest Persian woman poet writing in the classical style. One of her remarkable series, called Mast va Hoshyar (The Drunk and the Sober), won admiration from many of those involved in romantic poetry.

==== Modern Persian poetry ====
Nima Yushij is considered the father of modern Persian poetry, introducing many techniques and forms to differentiate the modern from the old. Nevertheless, the credit for popularizing this new literary form within a country and culture solidly based on a thousand years of classical poetry goes to his few disciples such as Ahmad Shamlou, who adopted Nima's methods and tried new techniques of modern poetry.

The transformation brought about by Nima Youshij, who freed Persian poetry from the fetters of prosodic measures, was a turning point in a long literary tradition. It broadened the perception and thinking of the poets that came after him. Nima offered a different understanding of the principles of classical poetry. His artistry was not confined to removing the need for a fixed-length hemistich and dispensing with the tradition of rhyming but focused on a broader structure and function based on a contemporary understanding of human and social existence. His aim in renovating poetry was to commit it to a "natural identity" and to achieve a modern discipline in the mind and linguistic performance of the poet.

Nima held that the formal technique dominating classical poetry interfered with its vitality, vigor and progress. Although he accepted some of its aesthetic properties and extended them in his poetry, he never ceased to widen his poetic experience by emphasizing the "natural order" of this art. What Nima Youshij founded in contemporary poetry, his successor Ahmad Shamlou continued.

The Sepid poem (which translates to white poem), which draws its sources from this poet, avoided the compulsory rules which had entered the Nimai’ school of poetry and adopted a freer structure. This allowed a more direct relationship between the poet and his or her emotional roots. In previous poetry, the qualities of the poet’s vision as well as the span of the subject could only be expressed in general terms and were subsumed by the formal limitations imposed on poetic expression.

Nima’s poetry transgressed these limitations. It relied on the natural function inherent within poetry itself to portray the poet’s solidarity with life and the wide world surrounding him or her in specific and unambiguous details and scenes. Sepid poetry continues the poetic vision as Nima expressed it and avoids the contrived rules imposed on its creation. However, its most distinct difference with Nimai’ poetry is to move away from the rhythms it employed. Nima Youshij paid attention to an overall harmonious rhyming and created many experimental examples to achieve this end.

Ahmad Shamlu discovered the inner characteristics of poetry and its manifestation in the literary creations of classical masters as well as the Nimai’ experience. He offered an individual approach. By distancing himself from the obligations imposed by older poetry and some of the limitations that had entered the Nimai’ poem, he recognized the role of prose and music hidden in the language. In the structure of Sepid poetry, in contrast to the prosodic and Nimai’ rules, the poem is written in more "natural" words and incorporates a prose-like process without losing its poetic distinction. Sepid poetry is a developing branch of Nimai’ poetry built upon Nima Youshij's innovations. Nima thought that any change in the construction and the tools of a poet’s expression is conditional on his/her knowledge of the world and a revolutionized outlook. Sepid poetry could not take root outside this teaching and its application.

According to Simin Behbahani, Sepid poetry did not receive general acceptance before Bijan Jalali's works. He is considered the founder of Sepid poetry according to Behbahani. Behbahani herself used the "Char Pareh" style of Nima, and subsequently turned to ghazal, a free-flowing poetry style similar to the Western sonnet. Simin Behbahani contributed to a historic development in the form of the ghazal, as she added theatrical subjects, and daily events and conversations into her poetry. She has expanded the range of traditional Persian verse forms and produced some of the most significant works of Persian literature in the 20th century.

A reluctant follower of Nima Yushij, Mehdi Akhavan-Sales published his Organ (1951) to support contentions against Nima Yushij's groundbreaking endeavors. In Persian poetry, Mehdi Akhavan Sales has established a bridge between the Khorassani and Nima Schools. The critics consider Mehdi Akhavan Sales as one of the best contemporary Persian poets. He is one of the pioneers of free verse (new style poetry) in Persian literature, particularly of modern style epics. It was his ambition, for a long time, to introduce a fresh style to Persian poetry.

Forough Farrokhzad is important in the literary history of Iran for three reasons. First, she was among the first generation to embrace the new style of poetry, pioneered by Nima Yushij during the 1920s, which demanded that poets experiment with rhyme, imagery, and the individual voice. Second, she was the first modern Iranian woman to graphically articulate private sexual landscapes from a woman's perspective. Finally, she transcended her own literary role and experimented with acting, painting, and documentary film-making.

Fereydoon Moshiri is best known as conciliator of classical Persian poetry with the New Poetry initiated by Nima Yooshij. One of the major contributions of Moshiri's poetry, according to some observers, is the broadening of the social and geographical scope of modern Persian literature.

A poet of the last generation before the Islamic Revolution worthy of mention is Mohammad-Reza Shafiei-Kadkani (M. Sereshk). Though he is from Khorassan and sways between allegiance to Nima Youshij and Akhavan Saless, in his poetry he shows the influences of Hafiz and Mowlavi. He uses simple, lyrical language and is mostly inspired by the political atmosphere. He is the most successful of those poets who in the past four decades have tried hard to find a synthesis between the two models of Ahmad Shamloo and Nima Youshij.

In the twenty-first century, a new generation of Iranian poets continues to work in the New Poetry style and now attracts an international audience thanks to efforts to translate their works. Éditions Bruno Doucey published a selection of forty-eight poems by Garus Abdolmalekian entitled Our Fists under the Table (2012). translated into French by Farideh Rava. Other notable names are poet and publisher Babak Abazari (1984–2015), who died under mysterious circumstances in January 2015; and emerging young poet Milad Khanmirzaei.

== Persian literature awards ==
- Sadegh Hedayat Award
- National Ferdowsi Prize
- Houshang Golshiri Award
- Bijan Jalali Award
- Iran's Annual Book Prize
- Martyr Avini Literary Award
- Mehrgan Adab Prize
- Parvin Etesami Award
- Yalda Literary Award
- Isfahan Literary Award
- Persian Speculative Art and Literature Award
- Jalal Al-e Ahmad Literary Awards
- Golden Pen Awards
- Lois Roth Persian Translation Prize
- Jaleh Esfahani Poetry Award

== See also ==
- Academy of Persian Language and Literature
- Diwan (poetry), term for Persian poetry collections
- Takhallus, Persian term for pen names
- List of countries and territories where Persian is an official language

== Sources ==
- Farmanfarmaian, Fatema Soudavar (2009). Arjomand, Saïd Amir (ed.). "Georgia and Iran: Three Millennia of Cultural Relations An Overview". Journal of Persianate Studies. 2 (1). BRILL: 1–43. doi:10.1163/187471609X445464.
