= 1915 in Iran =

- Decades
- See also: Other events of 1915; Years in Iran

The following lists events that happened during 1915 in Qajar era.

== Incumbents ==
- Monarch: Ahmad Shah Qajar
- Prime Minister: Mostowfi ol-Mamalek (until March 14), Hassan Pirnia (March 14 – May 1), Abdol Majid Mirza (May 1 – August 18), Mostowfi ol-Mamalek (August 18 – December 24), Abdol-Hossein Farman Farma (starting December 24)

== Events ==
- December 17 – Battle of Robat Karim.

== Births ==
- January 1 – Fazlollah Reza, Iranian scientist and diplomat (d. 2019)
- January 14 – Mahmoud Etemadzadeh, Iranian writer.
- April 15 – Khosro Roozbeh, Iranian politician.
- September 13 – Emanuel Melik-Aslanian, Iranian musician.
- October 23 – Rouben Gregorian, Iranian conductor, musician and composer.
- November 20 – Robert Atayan, Armenian musicologist.
- ? – Abbas Ekrami, Iranian football manager.
- ? – Ataollah Zahed, Iranian actor and film director.
- ? – Fathollah Minbashian, persian general.
- ? – Fazlollah Reza, Iranian electrical engineer.
- ? – Jafar Shafaghat, Persian politician.
- ? – Khadijeh Saqafi, Iranian revolutionary and Ruhollah Khomeini's wife.
- ? – Musa Nuri Esfandiari, Persian diplomat.
- ? – Nosratollah Amini, Iranian politician.
- ? – Noureddin Kianouri, Iranian politician.
- ? – Saeed Amani, Iranian politician.

== Deaths ==
- September 4 – Rais-Ali Delvari, national hero of Iran.
- ? – Mirza Agha Tabrizi, Iranian playwright and writer.
- ? – Mirza Ebrahim Khan Akkas Bashi, Iranian cinematographer and photographer.
- ? – Mirza Hossein-Qoli, Iranian musician.
