= Sepid Persian Poetry =

Free verse movement in Persian poetry

Sepid poetry (sepid, "white") or "White Poetry" is a free verse movement of Modern Persian poetry that departs from Classical Persian prosody and adopts "new content, viewpoint, and diction". Ahmad Shamloo is considered the founder of the White Poetry movement, which came to its mature form and general acceptance after Bijan Jalali.

For the last two decades of his life, Manouchehr Atashi was also involved in Sepid poetry.
