= Luna Publications =

Luna Publications is a literary publishing company located in Toronto, Ontario, Canada. It was founded in 2006 by Goran Simic, a writer of poetry, essays, short stories and theatre. His associates include business partner Vishja Brcic, editor Fraser Sutherland, and designer Shaun Tai.

On Wednesday, September 26, 2007, Luna Publications launched Ceasefire in Purgatory, Irish-Canadian poet and literary translator Colin Carberry's second collection of poetry, at The Dora Keogh Irish Pub. Previous Luna Publications titles include Making Bones Walk, by Canada's Alex Boyd (2007); and Chilean-US poet and publisher Mariela Griffor's Exiliana (2006). New releases by Iranian-US author Fereshteh Molavi, and Serbian-Canadian author Nenad Jovanovic were in the planning stages but as of 2015 there is no indication these titles were published or that the company is still in business.

On June 21, 2008, at the League of Canadian Poets' Poetry Fest and Conference in St. John’s, Newfoundland, Toronto poet Alex Boyd was the winner of the Lampert Award for his book Making Bones Walk published by Luna Publications.

New releases by Iranian-US author Fereshteh Molavi, and Serbian-Canadian author Nenad Jovanovic were in the planning stages but as of 2015 there is no indication these titles were published.
