= Lubab ul-Albab =

Persian anthology (13th century)

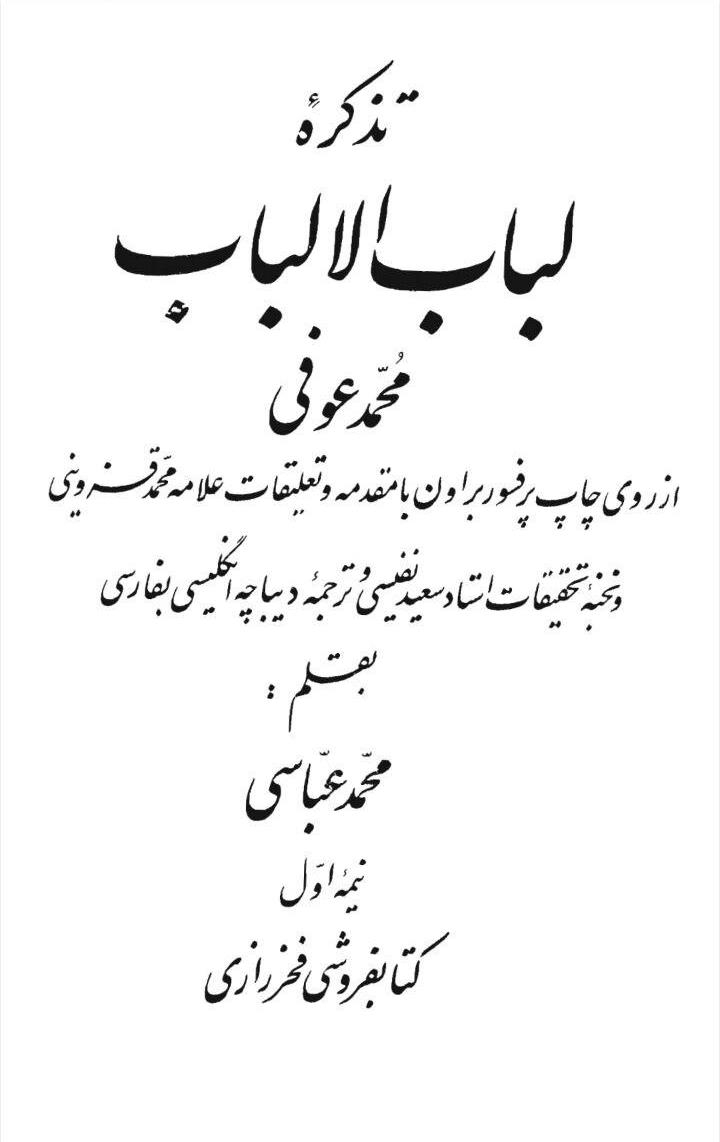

Lubab ul-Albab (Persian: لباب الالباب, variously translated as "Quintessence of Hearts", "The best selection", or "The select of the select") is a renowned anthology written by Muhammad Aufi in eastern Persia. It was reportedly completed in 1221.

== Composition ==
The Lubab ul-Albab is considered as the oldest extant biographical work in Persian literature and the most important collection of biographies of Persian poets. It is essentially a history of literature, or more accurately, a collection of biographies of poets written in a highly ornate style. Although Aufi was not a distinguished stylist, the significance of both the Lubab ul-Albab and the Jawami ul-Hikayat lies in their practical value. This book includes 27 biographies of the poets who lived in the same era.

The Lubab ul-Albab serves as a key resource for studying the poetry of the Seljuq period. Aufi begins by acknowledging the contributions of royal figures who wrote poetry, listing 27 rulers from the late 10th to the 12th century, whose works constitute about 6% of the anthology. Following the kings, the anthology includes works by viziers (14%), religious scholars (ulama, 38%), and a substantial group of court poets, who make up 62% of the content. It contains the only known poetry of Nizami Aruzi, which consists of four brief fragments and a single quatrain.

== Modern era ==
Only one hand-written copy is known to exist, owned by Nathaniel Blend in 1846 and the other resides in the Berlin Imperial Library. Later, the orientalist Edward Brown published Blend's copy in 1906.

== Sources ==
- Dahlén, Ashk P. (2009). "Kingship and Religion in a Mediaeval Fürstenspiegel: The Case of the Chahār Maqāla of Niżāmī ʽArūẓī". Orientalia Suecana. 58: 9–24.
- Durand-Guédy, D. (2024). "11 The Persian Quatrains of Sultan Toghrïl b. Arslan (d. 590/1194): Reflections on the Literacy and Culture of the Saljuqs". Rulers as Authors in the Islamic World. Leiden, The Netherlands: Brill.
- Rypka, J. (1968). "Poets and Prose Writers of the Late Saljuq and Mongol Periods". In Boyle, J. A. (ed.). The Cambridge History of Iran. Vol. 5: The Saljuq and Mongol Periods. Cambridge University Press. pp. 550–625.
