= The Aryanpur Progressive English–Persian Dictionary =

The Aryanpur Progressive English–Persian Dictionary, in six volumes, is an English–Persian dictionary written by Abbas Arianpour Kashani and Manouchehr Arianpour Kashani published by The Computer World, a publication company in Tehran, Iran.
