= Mohammad Aufi =

Persian historian, philologist and author

Mohammad Ibn Mohammad 'Aufi Bukhari
- سدید الدین محمد عوفی
- Born: Bukhara, Khwarezmian Empire (modern-day Uzbekistan)

Academic work
- Main interests: History, Philology
- Notable works: Lubab ul-Albab, Jawami ul-Hikayat

Sadīd ad-Dīn Mohammad Ibn Mohammad 'Aufī Bokhārī (Persian: سدید الدین محمد عوفی; fl. late 12th – early 13th centuries), also known under the laqab Nur ad-Dīn, was a Persian historian, philologist, and author.

== Biography ==
Born in Bukhara, Aufi claimed descent from Abd al-Raḥmān ibn ʿAwf (d. 654) a companion of the Islamic prophet Muhammad. He grew up during the apex of the Islamic Golden Age and spent many years traveling, exploring, and lecturing to the common folk and the royalty alike in Delhi, Khorasan, Khwarezm, Samarkand, Merv, Nishapur, Sistan and Ghaznin. Apparently, Aufi was for some time in the service of the Qarakhanid Uthman ibn Ibrahim who placed him in charge of his correspondence (dīvān-e ensha). Aufi left Samarkand before 1204. Later he spent most of his time at the court of the Ghurids. He dedicated his first grand work. Lubab ul-Albab, which consisted of poems by kings and poets of ancient times, to Amir Nāsiruddīn Qobājeh (ناصرالدین قباجه) (d. 1227), who was then ruler of Multan.

His second magnum opus, Jawami ul-Hikayat, was written under the name of the Vizier of the Ghurid Amir of Delhi. He lived during the reign of Shamsuddin Iltutmish (Altamash) (r. 1211–1236) who was the third Muslim Turkic sultan of the Sultanate of Delhi, and the book is dedicated to his minister, Nizām-ul-Mulk Muhammad, son of Abu Sa'id Junaidi. These two are the only remaining works from him today. His works on The History of Turkistani Lords, and his book On the Properties of Matter, both referenced elsewhere, do not exist anymore. A small fragment of his Madāyih al-Sultān remains.

== Works ==
- Lubab ul-Albab (variously translated as "Quintessence of Hearts", "The best selection", or "The select of the select", لباب الالباب), published 1220.
- Al-Farj ba'd ul-Shudat ("Joy after difficulty", الفرج بعد الشدة), translated 1226.
- Jawami ul-Hikayat ("Collection of tales and the light of traditions", جوامع الحكايات و لوامع الروايات), published 1228.

== Work online ==
- Elliot, H. M. (Henry Miers), Sir; John Dowson (1871). "4. Jawami ul-Hikayat of Muhammad Ufi". The History of India, as Told by Its Own Historians. The Muhammadan Period (Vol 2.). London: Trübner & Co.

== See also ==
- List of Iranian scientists
- List of Persian poets and authors
