= Goran Simić (poet) =

Bosnian-Canadian poet (1952–2024)

- Горан Симић
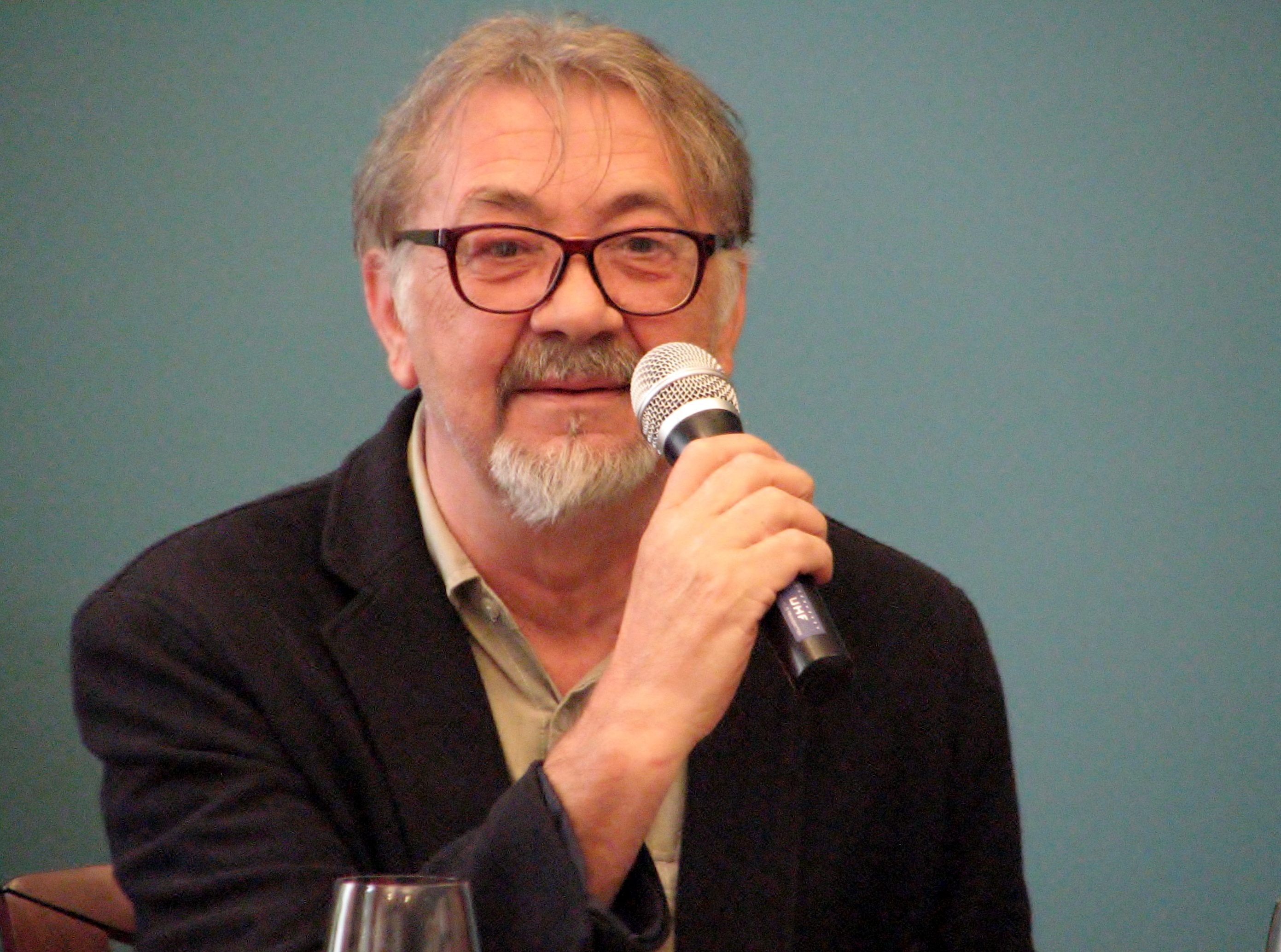
- Simić in 2014 at the Tallinn Central Library within the framework of the literary festival HeadRead
- Born: 20 October 1952; Vlasenica, PR Bosnia and Herzegovina, FPR Yugoslavia
- Died: 29 September 2024 (aged 71); Sarajevo, Bosnia and Herzegovina

Goran Simić (20 October 1952 – 29 September 2024) was a Bosnian-Canadian poet recognized internationally for his works of poetry, essays, short stories, and theatre.

== Biography ==
Simić was born in Vlasenica, Bosnia and Herzegovina in 1952 and wrote eleven volumes of poetry, drama, and short fiction, including Sprinting from the Graveyard (Oxford, 1997). One of the most prominent writers of the former Yugoslavia, his work has been translated into nine languages and has been published and performed in several European countries.

Simić was trapped in the Siege of Sarajevo. In 1995 he and his family were able to settle in Canada as the result of a Freedom to Write Award from PEN.

Immigrant Blues was Simić's second full-length volume of poems in English, and the first to be published in Canada. This was followed by two books published in 2005: a poetry collection, From Sarajevo, With Sorrow — which involves a retranslation of the earlier, bowdlerized versions found in David Harsent's Sprinting from the Graveyard; and Yesterday's People, a collection of short fiction, which was shortlisted for both the Relit Award and the Danuta Gleed Award for best first collection of short fiction (both published by Biblioasis). A volume of Simic's poetry titled Selected Poems was tentatively scheduled to be published in the Fall of 2007. In 2010, Simić published two more books: a poetry volume entitled Sunrise in the Eyes of the Snowman (Biblioasis) and his second collection of stories, Looking for Tito (Frog Hollow Press).

In 2006, Simić founded Luna Publications in Toronto, Canada. Simić joined the Faculty of Arts and Sciences of the University of Guelph in September 2006.

In 2013, he returned to live in Sarajevo.

== Personal life ==
His brother was Novica Simić, an officer in the Bosnian Serb army.

== Death ==
Simić died on 29 September 2024, at the age of 72.
