= Nasim Khaksar =

Iranian writer

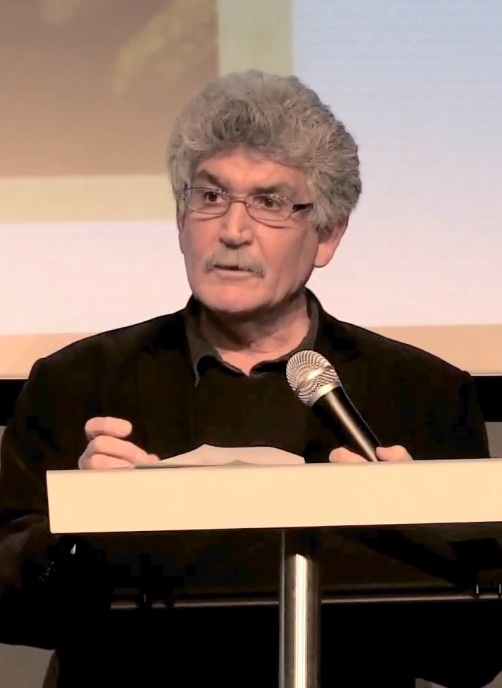
Nasim Khaksar, November 2014.

Nasim Khaksar (born January 1, 1944, Abadan) is an Iranian writer. He fled Iran to live in the Netherlands.

== Biography ==
Nasim was born in the southern city of Abadan. Upon receiving his teaching certification from colleges in Esfahan and Hamadan, he taught in villages in the Abadan and Boyer-Ahmad County of southern Iran until his arrest for political activity in 1968.

Nasim served two prison terms amounting to 8 years. He began writing fiction in 1966. He writes short stories, novels, plays, poetry, criticism, and travel literature. Among his works, are two collections of his short stories, The Grocer of Kharzeville and Between Two Doors, both of which have been translated and published in Dutch as well as his novel Windmills and Lashes. Also, collections of his plays, Under the Roof and an account of his travels to Tajikistan also translated and published in Dutch in the Netherlands. In addition to those, a number of his stories, plays and articles have been translated into German, English, French, and Swedish. Obliged to leave Iran after the revolution, Nasim currently lives in the Netherlands. Since he began his life in exile, he has been an articulate voice for the experiences of millions of Iranians who had to adjust to life in unfamiliar lands. He has been particularly adept at demonstrating the feelings of disassociation, loss of language, and the inability to express oneself and one's feelings that accompany the experience of exile. Books published in Dutch 1-De Kruidenier van Kharzavil ( Verhalen) Story 2-Reis naar Tadzijkistan ( Reis Verhaal) Travel book 3-Weerhanen en Zeepslagen ( Roman) 4-Tussen twee deuren ( Verhalen) Story 5- Onder Dak, Sterren op aarde, De laatste Brief( Toneelteksten) Play

== Bibliography ==
=== Books published in Iran ===
- 1970 Let us read together
- 1973 I know the children love for spring to come
- 1979 the Embryo collection of short stories
- 1979 if people would love each other
- 1980 The Bread and the Flower collection of short stories
- 1981 Tree, Road, Kid collection of poems.
- 1981 Steps to be taken. Novel
- 1982 The Little Intellectual. Collection of short stories.
- 1983 I Love Peace Story for Children

=== Books published in Europe ===
- 1987 The Men of Yesterday Interrelated Stories
- 1987 Three Plays
- 1988 The Grocer of Kharzavil collection of short stories about exile ISBN 978-1-780-83298-2
- 1988 The Love of Hadj Agha Collection of Short stories
- 1989 The story of the winding alley and the four old women. Story for the children.
- 1989 Elegy for a friend Collection of poems
- 1989 The last letter . Play
- 1990 The Cage of Jahan Khanom's Parot. Novel ISBN 978-1-780-83046-9
- 1991 The Changing Voice . Collection of reviews, articles, and lectures on art and literature.
- 1994 Journey to Tajikistan . Travel journal ISBN 978-1-780-83047-6
- Khaksar, Nasim (1996). GAZELLES IN THE SNOW: AHOVAN DAR BARF. p. 148. ISBN 978-1-780-83535-8.
- 2010 Zwischen zwei Türen: Geschichten aus der Diaspora ISBN 978-3-962-02087-3
- 2012 Vanes and Whips: Badnama-Ha Va Shalagh-Ha (Persian Edition) . Novel ISBN 978-1-780-83177-0
- 2012 Rising to the Sun: Faraz-e Masnad-e Khorshid (Persian Edition) ISBN 978-1-780-83189-3
- Khaksar, Nasim (2015). Christina. p. 72. ISBN 978-1-780-83534-1.
- Khaksar, Nasim (2017). Arizona Road: Jaddeh-ye Arizona. p. 116. ISBN 978-1-780-83750-5.
- PART TWO: The Road To Arizona. ISBN 978-1-566-56511-0
- 2017 Little Intellectual: Roshanfekr-E Koochak ISBN 978-1-780-83749-9
- Khaksar, Nasim (2008). The Constitution of Free India, 1946 A.C. p. 160. ISBN 978-0-976-03339-4.

=== Other literary works ===
- Khaksar, Nasim (1991). "The wedding for the dead". Index on Censorship. 20 (7): 21–23. doi:10.1080/03064229108535153.
- Khaksar, Nasim (1988). "The day dreamer". Index on Censorship. 17 (5): 72–75. doi:10.1080/03064228808534434.
- Gām'hā-yi paymūdan / Nasīm Khāksār. 1982 OCLC 298988944
- Khaksar, Nasim (1997). "Text and memory in the literature of the Iranian diaspora: the last letter:a play in one act". Iranian Studies. 30 (3–4): 309–325. doi:10.1080/00210869708701880.
- Khaksar, Nasim (1990). "For the love of Hajj Agha". Index on Censorship. 19 (2): 27–31. doi:10.1080/03064229008534795.
