= Parween Pazhwak =

Afghan artist and poet

Parween Pazhwak پروین پژواک
- Born: 1967 (age 58–59); Kabul, Afghanistan
- Occupations: Writer; Poet; Women's activist
- Website: http://www.hozhaber.com/

Parween Pazhwak (born in 1967 in Kabul) is an Afghan artist from Afghanistan and a modern poet and writer of the Persian language.

== Biography ==
Parween Pazhwak was born to the Pazhwak literary and political family, her father and mother being Ne'matulla Pazhwak and Afifah Pazhwak, respectively. She is the granddaughter of Abdul Rahman Pazhwak.

Pazhwak went to the French-taught Malalai school and completed studying medicine in the Avicenna Medical Institute. Following the Soviet Union's invasion of Afghanistan, she spent two years in Pakistan as a transit refugee before moving to Canada as an asylum seeker. She lives in Ontario together with her husband and children.

Pazhwak considers the best time in her life to be her days as a student and life in exile to be among her most difficult times. Her works of literature include modern Persian poetry, short stories, and paintings for children. She has created eleven works of art. Two of her most famous published books are Darya dar Shabnam (Oceans in Dew) and Negin-ha wa Setara-ha (Gems and Stars).

== Sources ==
- R M Chopra, "Eminent Poetesses of Persian", Iran Society, Kolkata, 2010
