= Mahasti Shahrokhi =

Iranian writer

Mahasti Shahrokhi (Persian: مهستی شاهرخی) is an Iranian novelist, poet, and winner of numerous literary prizes. Her novel, A Shawl as Long as the Silk Road (Baran Publication, Sweden, 1999) attracted critical attention, and Cactus magazine (published in the U.S.) devoted its third publication to this novel. Her recent writings have been published in Another Sea, Another Shore: Persian Stories of Migration (Interlink World Fiction, United States), and The Other Voices International Poetry . Her novel Sobh-e Nahan and poetry collection Jomhoori-e Sokoot are due for publication.

Mahasti earned her Ph.D. in literature at the Sorbonne, France. She lives in Paris.

== Books ==
- The Other Voices International poetry Anthology
- Another Sea, Another Shore (Interlink World Fiction), 2004 (Contributing author) ISBN 978-1-566-56511-0
- Shaban Nikou (Persian: شبان نیکو, Baran Publishing) (Persian) ISBN 978-9-188-29777-8
- A Shawl as Long as the Silk Road (Persian: شالی به دارازای جاده ی ابریشم, Shali Be Deraza-ye Jadeh-ye Abrisham, Baran Publishing)
- Jomhuri-ye Sokout: Republique du Silence (Persian Edition), 2013 ISBN 978-1-492-25831-5
- Ma patrie ? Mes chaussures !: Adaptation Française Du Persan Par Valérie Alis-Salamanca (French Edition), 2015 ISBN 978-2-343-07325-5
- shali be deraza-ye jadeh abrisham: Un Châle aussi long que la route de soie, Persian Edition ISBN 978-9-188-29729-7
- Degardissi-ye cinema-ye iran beh cinema-ye Halal: Majmo'eh-ye Maghaleh, Persian Edition ISBN 978-1-494-72657-7
- Sobh-e nahan: L'aube latente (Persian Edition) ISBN 978-1-492-13834-1
