= Mostafa Mastoor =

Iranian writer, translator and researcher

Mostafa Mastoor (Persian: مصطفی مستور; born 1964 in Ahvaz) is an Iranian writer, translator and researcher. He has translated Carver's books into Persian.

His novel "Kiss the Fair Face of God" was a best-seller in Iran.
