= Bijan Jalali =

Iranian poet (1927–2000)

- بیژن جلالی
- Born: 1927; Tehran, Iran
- Died: 2000 (aged 72–73)

Bijan Jalali (Persian: بیژن جلالی; 1927 – January 2000) was a modern Persian poet.

Jalali was born in Tehran, Iran. His works include: The Color of Water, Days, Dailies, Our Heart and the World, Play of Light, and The Water and the Sun.

== See also ==
- Nima Yooshij
- Persian literature
