= Manouchehr Arianpour =

Iranian translator and lexicographer (1929–2021)

Manouchehr Arianpour Kashani
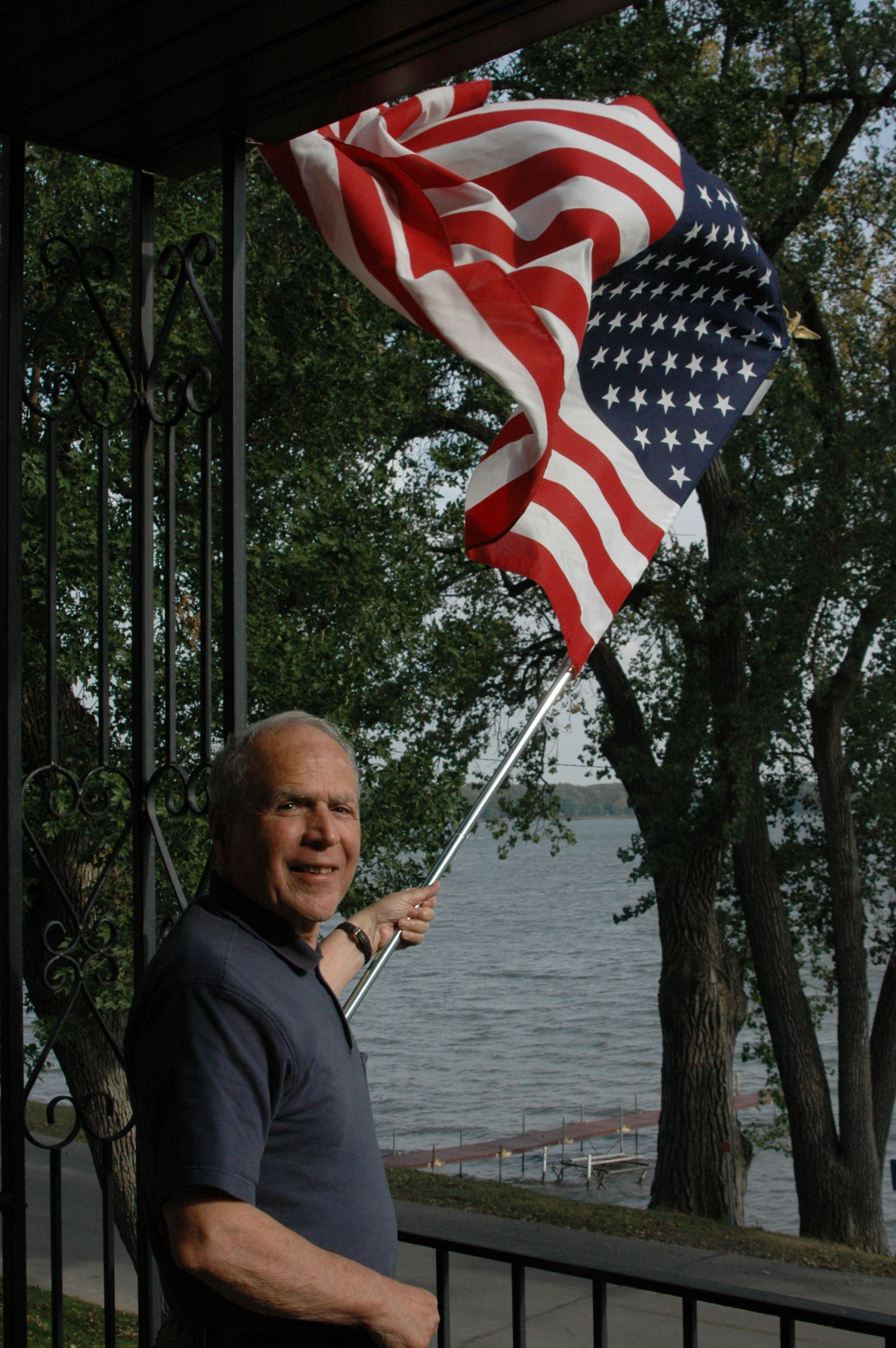
- Arianpour celebrating his American citizenship, 2009
- Native name: Persian: منوچهر آریان‌پور
- Born: 2 September 1929 Kashan, Isfahan, Imperial State of Iran
- Died: 22 December 2021 (aged 92) La Jolla, California, US
- Occupation: Translator, lexicographer, educator
- Education: University of Kansas (BA); University of Colorado (PhD)
- Notable works: The Aryanpur Progressive English–Persian Dictionary
- Notable awards: Fulbright Scholar
- Spouse: Sherry Aryanpur
- Children: 6

Academic background
- Thesis: Sir Walter Raleigh's Historie of the World and Persia (1958)

Manouchehr Arianpour Kashani (Persian: منوچهر آریان‌پور, 2 September 1929 – 22 December 2021) was an Iranian translator and lexicographer. He is the son of Abbas and Robaneh Aryanpur-Kashani.

== Life ==
Manouchehr Arianpour was born on 2 September 2 1929, in Kashan. He founded the College of Translation with the help of his father in 1969. After graduating, he taught at American universities. In 1969, he and his father founded the College of Translation in Tehran a Four Year B.A. degree program where the students were educated in various fields of translation. He received his doctorate from the University of Colorado in 1958 with a dissertation on Walter Raleigh.

Manouchehr Arianpour Kashani in the early years of the 1970s with the help of students and some professors of the College he began to compile the Aryanpur Dictionary of English Lexicology, which results in a variety of Persian to English and English to Persian dictionaries. In addition to the dictionary, he has authored and translated other works. One of these works is called Leading English Grammar and Writing Ritual.

== Death ==
Manouchehr Arianpour died on December 22, 2021, at the age of 92 in the United States. He was a naturalized citizen of the United States.

== Works ==
Some of his works are:

- The Aryanpur Progressive English–Persian Dictionary
- Pishro Arianpour High School Culture
- Arianpour Leading Vocabulary Guide
- Arianpour English grammar and writing ritual
- Persian words in English (Siri in the phonology of etymology).
- Farhang Bozorg One-volume Persian to Persian Pishro Arianpour.

== See also ==
- The Aryanpur Progressive English–Persian Dictionary
