= Shahrokh Meskoob =

Iranian writer, translator and historian (1924–2005)

Shahrokh Meskoub
- Born: January 11, 1924; Babol, Iran
- Died: April 12, 2005 (aged 81); Paris, France
- Occupations: writer, translator, scholar and university professor

Shahrokh Meskoub (Persian: شاهرخ مسکوب) (January 11, 1924 in Babol, Iran – April 12, 2005, in Paris, France), was an Iranian writer, translator, social critic, literary historian, and university professor. Meskoob is considered a preeminent Shahnameh scholar.

== Life ==
Born in the northern city of Babol in 1924, Meskoob showed a serious interest in literature from an early age. He completed the five-year elementary education program at the Tehran Elmyeh School, a first of its kind founded by the Society of Education that offered a modern curriculum in mathematics, history, and natural sciences. After attending adab high school in Isfahan, he returned to Tehran in 1945 to study law at the University of Tehran. In Tehran, he learned French, started writing for a local newspaper on current events, and became involved with leftist political activism inspired by the French intellectual movement of the time.

His activism attracted the attention of the Pahlavi-era security forces, which led to serial arrests and eventual imprisonment. He was arrested in Abadan in 1952 and imprisoned for a year after which he was sent to Shiraz on exile. He was imprisoned again from March 1955 until May 1957, during which he was tortured. He later said that the memory of his mother and of his close friend Morteza Keyvan, who had been executed in the same year as Meskoob's arrest and imprisonment, had helped him endure.

From 1959 until the 1979 Iranian revolution, he worked for different government sectors.

Meskoob was forced to leave Iran permanently following the Iranian Revolution of 1979, after he wrote critically of the new regime in Ayandegan newspaper. He lived in Europe and spent most of his time with his sister in France.

He died on April 12, 2005, in Paris, aged 81 due to complications associated with leukemia.

== Works ==
Meskoob was the first Iranian scholar who worked on Ferdowsi's Shahnameh on the basis of the principles of modern literary criticism. Among his most famous books is Soog-e Siavash, which is based on Siavash character of Shahnameh.

His major published works include translations of Sophocles' Antigone, Oedipus Rex, and Steinbeck's Grapes of Wrath; he has also written Moqaddame-'i bar Rostam va Esfandiar (a study of the ethics of Ferdowsi's Shahnameh); Soug-e Siavosh (a study of the myth of martyrdom and resurrection in the Shahnameh); and Dar kuy-e dust (an interpretive study of Hafez's views on man, nature, love, and ethics). He has also been involved in Harvard University's Iranian Oral History Project as an interviewer, conducting interviews with figures such as Houshang Nahavandi, Manouchehr Hashemi, and Mehrangiz Dowlatshahi.

=== Selected works ===
- Moqaddame-'i bar Rostam va Esfandiar (An Introduction to Rostam and Esfandiar), 1963
- —— (1971). Sūg-i Siyāvush : (dar marg va rastākhīz) سوگ سياوش: (در مرگ و رستاخيز) [Siavash's Mourning]. Tehran: Kharazmi. OCLC 907299045.
- Dar kuy-e doost (At a Friend's), 1978
- Meliyat va zaban (Iranian Nationality and the Persian Language, tr. into English by Michael C. Hillmann), 1992
- Ketab-e Morteza Keyvan (Book of Morteza Keyvan), 2003
- Soog-e Madar (Mother's Mourning), 2007

==== In English ====
- Iranian Nationality and the Persian Language
- The Ant's Gift: A Study of the Shahnameh
- In the Alley of the Friend: On the Poetry of Hafez

=== Selected translations ===
- Khooshehaye khashm (Steinbeck's The Grapes of Wrath), 1949
- Antigen (Sophocles' Antigone), 1956
- Adibe Shahryar (Sophocles' Oedipus Rex), 1961
- Promethe dar zanjir (Aeschylus' Prometheus Bound), 1963
- Oedipus dar colnous (Sophocles' Oedipus at Colonus), 1967
- Afsneyahe Tabaye (Sophocles, The Theban plays), 1973
