= Mehri Yalfani =

Iranian-born writer

Mehri Yalfani (Persian: مهری یلفانی Mihrī Yalfānī) (born in Hamadan, Iran) is an Iranian-born writer who writes both in Persian and English.

== Background ==
Mehri Yalfani was born in Hamadan, Iran. After finishing high school, she moved to Tehran and studied Electrical Engineering in Tehran University and worked as an engineer for twenty years. She began to write stories in high school and published her first collection of short stories, Happy Days, in 1966. For almost fifteen years, she concentrated on her family life and raising three children as well as her full-time job as an engineer. Then, her second book, and first novel, Before the Fall, was published in 1980. In 1985, she emigrated from Iran, first to France and later, in 1987, to Canada. Since then, she has dedicated her life to writing and publishing both in Persian and English. In 1991, the Par Cultural Foundation in the United States published her second collection of short stories, Birthday Party.

The same year, Baran Publications in Sweden published her second novel, Someone is Coming. In 1995, her first collection of short stories and poems in English, Parastoo, was published by Women's Press in Canada. Since then, she has published The Shadow, a collection of short stories in 1997, Far from Home, a novel in 1998, Dancing in A Broken Mirror, a novel shortlisted for Iran's Book of the Year Award in 2000, Two Sisters, a collection of short stories in English in 1999, her first novel in English, Afsaneh's Moon in 2002 and its Persian version published in Iran in 2004, a collection of poems, "Rahavard" in Iran in 2004, Tasvire Safoora in Sweden in 2012, Tahmineh’s Silence, which was banned by the government in Iran, got published by Nakoja Publications in France in 2014, The Street of Butterflies in 2017 in Canada by Inanna Publication, and A Palace in Paradise will be published in 2019 by Inanna Publication. Mehri Yalfani’s works are also assigned as part of reading materials in some colleges and universities, for which she receives access copyright.

Yalfani's Short stories appeared in anthologies such as In A Voice Of Their Own, Mazda Publications, USA, She’s Gonna Be, McGilligan Books, Canada, Pen Of Many Colours, Thommson & Nelson, Canada, When Your Voice Tastes Like Home, Second Story Press, Canada, Another Sea, Another Shore, Interlink Books, USA, Speaking in Tongues Banff Centre, Canada, Roots, 17 Iranian women writers, Bulgaria, Ruzi Ke Modaram Pir Shod, A Collection of Stories from Eastern writers, Bulgaria, and Let Me Tell You Where I’ve Been, University of Arkansas, USA.

Mehri Yalfani lives in Toronto, Ontario, Canada.
