= Mirza Agha Tabrizi =

19th-century Iranian civil servant and writer

Mirza Agha Tabrizi (Persian: میرزا آقا تبریزی) was a 19th-century Iranian civil servant and writer. He is noted for being the author of four comedies, which, for a long period of time had erroneously been attributed to the diplomat and advocate of modernization Mirza Malkam Khan (died 1908).

== Biography ==
Not many details are known about Tabrizi's life. According to a letter he wrote in 1871 to the well-known Mirza Fath-Ali Akhundzadeh (died 1878)—who was the source of inspiration for his comedies—Tabrizi states that he was born in Tabriz in northwestern Qajar Iran to a certain Mirza Agha Mehdi Monshi-Bashi. In his city of birth, he acquired an early interest in the French and Russian languages. In the same letter, Tabrizi states that he has worked for several years at the Iranian royal teachers' training college (perhaps referring to the mo'allem-khaneh-ye padeshahi) as well as at Iranian diplomatic posts abroad in Baghdad and Constantinople in the Ottoman Empire, and for seven years as first secretary (monshi-e awwal) at the Embassy of France in Tehran.

According to extant information, Tabrizi worked as a civil servant in 1846 in the Khorasan Province in the northeastern part of the country, and in 1853-58 he functioned as an interpreter and instructor in French at the Dar ul-Funun School. His earlier mentioned posts at Baghdad and Constantinople were reportedly in conjunction with the appointment of Mirza Hosein Khan Moshir od-Dowleh as the new ambassador to the Ottoman Empire. At this point, Tabrizi was apparently still inexperienced about European travel; according to Hasan Javadi and Farrokh Gaffary, he would have otherwise "had some understanding of the structure and functioning of a theater, something clearly lacking in his plays".

== Sources ==
- Javadi, Hasan; Gaffary, Farrokh (1986). "ĀQĀ TABRĪZĪ". Encyclopaedia Iranica, Vol. II, Fasc. 2. pp. 182–183.
- Rice, Kelsey (2020). "Emissaries of Enlightenment: Azeri Theater Troupes in Iran and Central Asia, 1906–44". Iranian Studies: 1–25. doi:10.1080/00210862.2020.1753022.
