= Asef Soltanzadeh =

Writer in Dari Persian

Mohammad Asef Soltanzadeh (Dari Persian: محمد آصف سلطان‌زاده) is a writer specialising in prose and drama, primarily in Dari Persian. He was born in Kabul, Afghanistan, in 1964 and moved to Pakistan. Then in 1985, he moved to Iran and then in 2002, he moved to Denmark.

Discovered by the Iranian writer and critic Hushang Golshiri, he has published his short stories in various literary journals. When his book Dar Goriz Gom Mishawim (English: We Disappear in Flight) was published in Tehran in 2000, he became famous among experts of literature in the Persian language (one of the literary languages of Afghanistan). The volume includes 8 stories.

In Iran a second volume of his short stories is being published."

His two collections of short stories, We Disappear in Flight and The Deserter won the prestigious Golshiri Award in Iran in 2001.

Soltanzadeh's short story Dotai pashe (A Pair of Clubs) from We Disappear in Flight has been translated from Dari Persian into Polish by Ivonna Nowicka.

== Works ==
=== Collections of Short stories ===
His most recent collections of stories, in Persian, are:

- We Disappear in Flight, Tehran: Agah, 2000.
- Newyear's Day Is Delightful Only in Kabul
- Now Denmark
- The Deserter
- You Who Are Here, This Is Not Your Land

=== Novels ===
- Eden's Hell (2 binds), Copenhagen: Bita Book, 2009.
- Book of Exodus, Copenhagen: Dyiar-e Ketab, 2011.
- The Cinematographer of Noqrah, Copenhagen: Bita Book, Dec. 2011.
- Alas, Mullah Omar, Copenhagen: Bita Book, 2013.
- The brazen Bulls, Copenhagen: Bita Book, 2014.
- The poisonous land, Copenhagen: Bita Book, 2017.
- The shadows of the Dar-ul-Khilafat, Copenhagen, Bita Book, 2020.
- The Afghan last supper, Kabul, Amiri Publication, 2022.
- The Trial, Kabul Book Publication, 2023.

=== Anthologized in ===
- Another Sea, Another Shore: Persian Stories of Migration. Ed. and trans. Shouleh Vatanabadi and Mohammad Mehdi Khorrami. Northampton, MA: Interlink Books, 2004.
- "Sohrab's Wars: Counter Discourses of Contemporary Persian Fiction". Ed. and trans. Mohammad Mehdi Khorrami and Pari Shirazi. Costa Mesa, California, Mazda Publishers, Inc., 2008.
- "Herfra min verden går. 23 flersprogede forfattere i Danmark". Copenhagen, Dansk PEN, 2009.
- "Writing from Afghanistan". Ed. and trans. Anders Widmark.

== Awards ==
- Golshiri Award, 2001 (Golshiri Foundation, Iran) - "for The Best First Collection of Short Stories, chosen for its impressive and macabre themes achieved through seemingly simple and unadorned language strewn with words and expressions from the author's homeland. Soltanzadeh's book has since been translated into French [Assef Soltanzadeh, Perdus dans la fuite, Actes sud, Paris, 2002] and Italian [M. A. Soltanzade, Perduti nella fuga, AIEP Editore, San Marino, 2002]."
- Danish Refugee Council Artist Award, 2003.
- Golshiri Award, 2007 (Golshiri Foundation, Iran) - for The Deserter, Award for the Best Collection of Short Stories.
- Nawrooz Award, 2010 (Kabul, Afghanistan) - for "The Deserter", Award for the Best Collection of Afghan Short Stories of the Decade.
