= Jawami ul-Hikayat =

13th-century collection of Persian anecdotes

Jawāmi ul-Hikāyāt wa Lawāmi' ul-Riwāyāt ("Collections of Stories and Illustrations of Histories", commonly known by the shorter title, Jawāmi ul-Hikāyāt, also transcribed Djami al-Hikayat and Jami al-Hikayat) (جوامع الحکایات و لوامع الروایات) is a famous collection of Persian anecdotes written in the early 13th century. It was written by Zahiroddin Nasr Mohammad Aufi, who lived during the reign of Shamsuddin Iltutmish (Altamash) (r. 1211–1236) the third Muslim Turkic sultan of the Sultanate of Delhi, and the book is dedicated to his minister, Nizam al-Mulk Muhammad, son of Abu Sa'id Junaidi.

The book was an encyclopaedia of anecdotage containing mines of interesting information, namely on historical information often not found elsewhere, from mythical times until the end of the rule of the Abbasid Caliph Al-Mustansir.

The entire text of this 2,500 page book is yet to be edited and printed. Currently, only abridged volumes have been published.

The oldest extant manuscript of this work exists in the Bibliothèque nationale de France, dated 1232.

== Content of jawami ul hikayat ==
The Jawami ul-Hikayat contains 4 volumes consisting of chapters of unequal length. Zahiriddin Nasr Muhammad Aufi used his personal observations, information from many Arab and Persian works (listed as sources in Jawami), as well as information gathered from individual traders concerning the conditions and life in different countries throughout every chapter. This makes the Jawami ul-Hikayat unique among Persian works.

== Work online ==
- Elliot, H. M. (Henry Miers), Sir; John Dowson (1871). "4. Jawami ul-Hikayat of Muhammad Ufi". The History of India, as Told by Its Own Historians. The Muhammadan Period (Vol 2.). London : Trübner & Co. (At Packard Institute)

== Catalog information ==
- Catalogue collectif de France (Recherche: Localisation de document: Titre: "Jawami"):

Type de document Monographies
Auteur(s) Nizam al-Din, Muhammad (Auteur)
Autre(s) Awfi, Sadid al-Din al-
Titre Introduction to the Jawami'u'l-hikayat wa lawami 'u'rriwayat of Sadidu'd-Din Muhammad al-'Awfi
Autre(s) titre(s) Gawami al-hikayat wa lawami al-riwayat
Langue Anglais
Publication London, Luzac & Co. : 1929, Leyden, E. J. BrillDescription 1 vol. (xxiii, 316 p.) -32 cm
Collection E. J. W.Gibb memorial . New series
Contenu Contient : Observations on the life and works of the author...; position of the Jawam. in Persian prose; conspectus of the sources of the Jawam.; chronological arrangement and description of all the known mss. of the Jawam.; comparative index of the hundred chapters of the Jawam.; complete table of contents of the four parts of the Jawam.; reclassification of the contents ...; alphabetical list of all the works mentioned in the Jawam.
Exemplaire 1

Cote et fonds PM 439.25 in-4
Université de la Sorbonne nouvelle. Service commun de la documentation*Bibliothèque de l'Institut détudes iraniennes. Paris

Exemplaire 2

Cote et fonds 801.4 NIZ
Université de la Sorbonne nouvelle. Service commun de la documentation*Bibliothèque de l'Orient et du monde arabe. Paris

== See also ==
- Persian literature
- Shahid Balkhi
