= Abbas Maroufi =

Iranian novelist, playwright, journalist and publisher (1957–2022)

- عباس معروفی
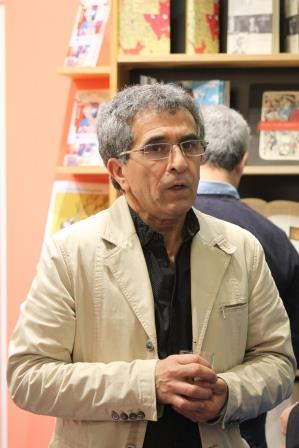
- Abbas Maroufi in 2016
- Born: 1957; Tehran, Iran
- Died: 1 September 2022 (aged 64–65); Berlin, Germany
- Education: University of Tehran
- Occupations: Novelist, playwright, journalist, publisher
- Years active: 1980–2022
- Notable work: Symphony of the Dead

Abbas Maroufi (Persian: عباس معروفی; 1957 – 1 September 2022) was an Iranian novelist, playwright, journalist and publisher. He was best known for his novel Symphony of the Dead (1989), which became one of the notable works of modern Persian fiction. He founded and edited the literary magazine Gardun in Tehran and continued his literary and publishing activities after moving to Germany in 1996. In Berlin, he established a Persian-language bookshop and the Hedayat House of Art and Literature, a cultural centre for Iranian writers and readers.

== Early life and education ==
Maroufi was born in Tehran, Iran, in 1957. He studied dramatic literature at the Faculty of Fine Arts of the University of Tehran. His literary development was influenced by Iranian writers Houshang Golshiri and Mohammad-Ali Sepanlou, under whose guidance he began developing his writing. Before becoming established as a writer, he worked as a literature teacher.

His first published book was the short story collection Rū-be-rū-ye Āftāb (Into the Sun), published in 1980. He subsequently wrote novels, short stories and plays, becoming known for his narrative experimentation and attention to the psychological and social dimensions of Iranian life.

== Literary career ==
Maroufi's best-known novel, Symphony of the Dead, was published in 1989. Its success brought him recognition among readers and critics in Iran and abroad. His literary work includes novels, short story collections and theatrical writing. Themes in his fiction include family conflict, authority, social restrictions, memory and the experiences of individuals confronting traditional and political pressures.

=== Symphony of the Dead ===
The cover of the first edition of Symphony of the Dead by Abbas Maroufi.

Symphony of the Dead (Persian: Samfoni-ye Mordegān) was published in Tehran in 1989. Set in Ardabil in northwestern Iran in the years following the Second World War, the novel follows the Urkhani family and centres on the conflict between the brothers Urhan and Ideen. The narrative explores the deterioration of family relationships and the effects of authoritarian attitudes and social pressures.

The novel is organised into four movements, reflecting its musical title. Its narrative uses shifting perspectives, monologues, memories and changes in chronology. In her article for Encyclopaedia Iranica, literary scholar Houra Yavari discusses the novel's structure, symbolism and contribution to the development of modern Persian fiction.

An English translation by Lotfali Khonji was published by Aflame Books in 2007. The novel has also appeared in German translation and has been discussed in international literary publications.

=== Other novels and short stories ===
Maroufi's other novels include The Year of Turmoil, The Body of Farhad, Fereydoun Had Three Sons, Completely Special, Melted and All the Dead Are Named Yahya. These works explore different aspects of Iranian society, family relationships, political change and individual identity.

His short story collections include Into the Sun, The Last Superior Generation and The Seafarers of the Bluer Island. He also wrote plays, including And God Created the Cow.

== Gardun magazine and publishing ==
In the 1980s, Maroufi established Gardun as a publishing initiative in Tehran. In 1990, he founded the literary magazine Gardun (Persian: گردون), serving as its editor. The magazine provided a platform for literary and cultural discussion and published work by writers and intellectuals. It became associated with debates about literature, culture and freedom of expression in Iran.

The magazine's editorial positions brought Maroufi into conflict with Iranian authorities. Its offices were attacked in 1991, and the publication was subsequently banned. Maroufi faced legal proceedings and was sentenced to imprisonment and corporal punishment. The case attracted international attention and protests from writers and literary organisations.

== Exile in Germany ==
Maroufi left Iran in 1996 and settled in Germany following the restrictions and legal pressure connected with his publishing activities. His departure was facilitated by the German PEN organisation and other writers, including Günter Grass. He initially spent time at the Heinrich Böll House in North Rhine-Westphalia before establishing himself in Berlin.

In Berlin, Maroufi continued writing and publishing in Persian. He established a Persian-language bookshop and the Gardun publishing operation, helping to make Persian literature available to readers outside Iran. He also worked to maintain connections between writers living in Iran and those in exile.

In 2002, he established the Hedayat House of Art and Literature in Berlin. The centre became a meeting place for Iranian writers and readers and supported literary events, publishing activities and creative writing courses. Maroufi used the centre to encourage aspiring writers, including people living in Iran and other Persian-speaking countries, to develop their literary work.

Despite living in Germany, Maroufi continued to write in Persian and remained involved in the literary life of the Iranian diaspora. His work as a publisher and cultural organiser contributed to the circulation of Persian-language literature outside Iran.

== Death ==
Maroufi died in a hospital in Berlin on 1 September 2022, aged 65, following a serious illness. He had publicly disclosed in 2019 that he had been diagnosed with lymphoma. His death was reported by PEN Deutschland and international media organisations, which remembered him as a prominent Iranian novelist, playwright, journalist and publisher.

== Selected works ==
=== Novels ===
- Symphony of the Dead (1989)
- The Year of Turmoil (1992)
- The Body of Farhad (1995)
- Fereydoun Had Three Sons (2001)
- Completely Special (2010)
- Melted (2009)
- All the Dead Are Named Yahya (2018)

=== Short story collections ===
- Into the Sun (1980)
- The Last Superior Generation (1986)
- The Scent of Jasmine (1992)
- The Seafarers of the Bluer Island (2003)

=== Plays ===
- Ta Kojā Bā Mani (1982)
- The Big Drum under the Left Foot (1983)
- Verg (1986)
- Deli-Bay and the Deer (1987)
- And God Created the Cow (1995), later retitled The Swing of Our Memories (2003)

=== Other works ===
- The Presence of Intimate Communion (collection of essays, 2000)
- Letters of Love and the Poem of Ayn al-Qudat and Love (with Pooneh Irani, 2011)
