= Mahmoud Etemadzadeh =

Iranian literary translator (1915–2006)

Mahmoud Etemadzadeh or Mahmoud Eʼtemadzadeh (Persian: محمود اعتمادزاده; 14 January 1915 – 31 May 2006 in Rasht, Iran), also known as M. A. Beh-azin (Persian: م.ا. به‌آذین), was an Iranian writer, literary translator, Navy Lieutenant, and political activist.

Behazin translated a large number of modern Western classics and some works by Shakespeare and Goethe. He was a member of the Tudeh Party. A group of his younger contemporaries recently provided a review of his work and life on the occasion of his centennial.

Behazin is highly regarded by literary circles in Iran for his quality and command of the Persian language and the resulting beauty and honesty of his translations into Persian of Western literary works.

== Works of translation ==
- 'And Quiet Flows the Don' by Mikhail Aleksandrovich Sholokhov
- 'Hamlet, Prince of Denmark' by William Shakespeare
- 'Othello' by William Shakespeare
- 'King Lear' by William Shakespeare
- 'The Enchanted Soul' by Romain Rolland
- 'Old Goriot' by Honore De Balzac
- 'Cousin Bette' by Honore De Balzac

== Military life ==
He studied naval engineering in "Brest" University in Paris, then he came to Iran and entered the Navy. He moved to Khoramshahr and after two years, he became the chief engineer of the Navy repairing workshop in Bandar-e Anzali. He was an Iranian Imperial Navy Lieutenant; his left hand was injured during the Anglo-Soviet invasion of Iran in Bandar-e Anzali by shrapnel from a Soviet bomb and was later amputated. He later left the navy and started literary translations.
