= Bahman Forsi =

Iranian playwright

- بهمن فُرسی
- Born: Bahman Forsi; 2 February 1933 (age 93); Tabriz, Iran
- Occupations: Novelist, playwright, poet, painter

Bahman Forsi (born 2 February 1933; Persian: بهمن فرسی) is an Iranian playwright who was born in Tabriz but immigrated to Tehran when he was four years old. At first he worked for newspapers and wrote several poems, short stories and reviews; he started to write plays afterwards. His first play was The Vase (1960). He was influenced by European absurdist theater, and therefore attempted to use a completely new language in his plays, described as novel for Iranian drama in the 1960s.

== Selected plays ==
- The Vase (1960)
- The Mouse (1963)
- Rungs of a Ladder (1963)
- Green in Green (1964)
- Spring and a Doll (1964)
- Two Times Two Is Infinity (1968)
- Breaking Sound (1971)
- Asylum (1977)

== Short story collections ==
- In the Dog's Teeth (1964)
- First Night, Second Night (1964)
- Twelfth (1991)
- Free Fall (1991)
- The Black Rock Candy (1992)
