= Fereshteh Molavi =

Iranian-Canadian fiction writer, scholar, translator and essayist

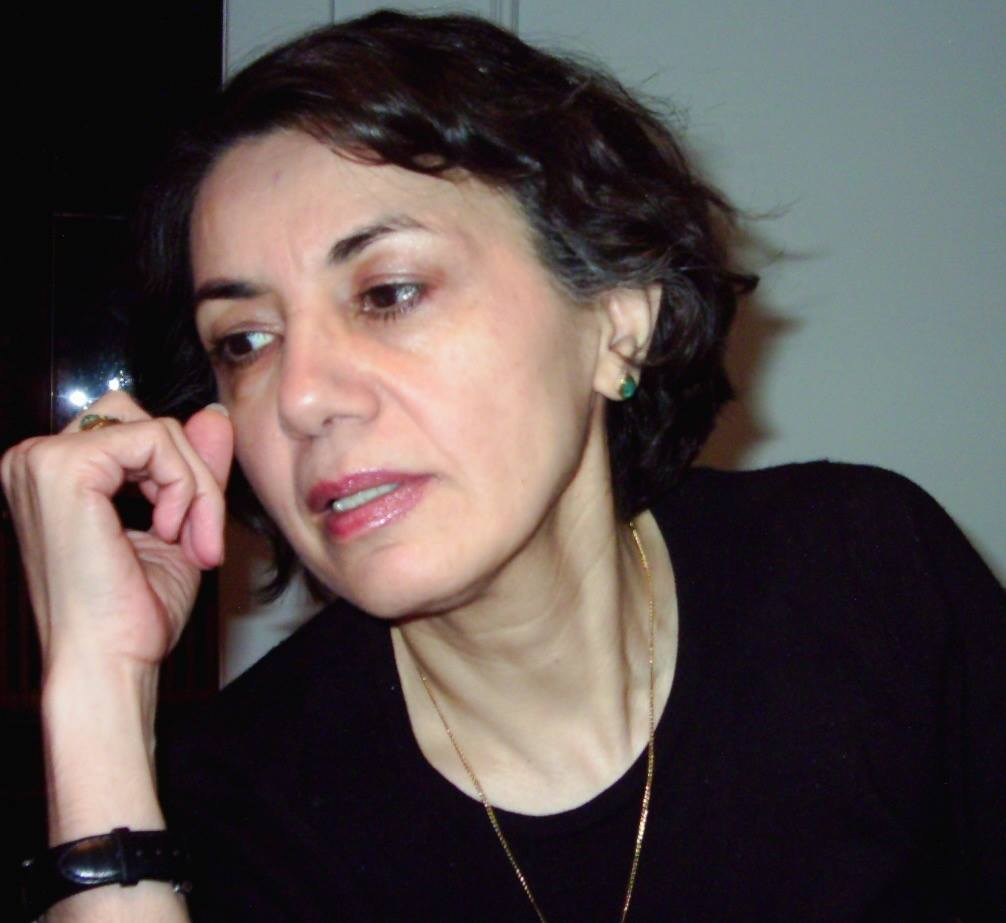
- Born: September 19, 1953 (age 72); Tehran, Iran
- Occupation(s): fiction writer and essayist
- Years active: 1975–present
- Website: http://www.fereshtehmolavi.net

Fereshteh Molavi (Persian: فرشته مولوی; born 19 September 1953, Tehran) is an Iranian-Canadian fiction writer and essayist. She is also a renowned scholar and translator.

== Biography ==
Born in Tehran a month after the coup in 1953, Fereshteh Molavi was raised and worked there as a writer, editor, translator, and research librarian until 1998. While in Iran, unable to publish some of her works due to censorship and war, she compiled a comprehensive bibliography of short stories in Persian. She also translated numerous works by internationally-known writers, including Juan Rulfo and Arnold Hauser. In 1987 she won the Asia-Pacific Cultural Centre for UNESCO Scholarship Award (Tokyo) for her translations, but she was barred from leaving the country by the Harasat (Intelligence Agency) office of the Ministry of Higher Education. A year later, she won the Best Translation Award (The Institute for the Intellectual Development of Children and Young Adults, Tehran). After ceasefire in 1988, she published her first novel, Khaneh-ye abr-o-bad (The House of Cloud and the Wind); her first collection of short stories, Pari Aftabi (The Sun Fairy); and two other fiction works, The Orange and the Bergamot and The Persian Garden. The Orange and the Bergamot was admired by the Children’s Book Council (Tehran, 1993) and nominated for «Les prix graphiques», Octogonales du CIELJ (Centre International d’Etudes en Littérature de Jeunesse, Paris, 1994).

After moving to Canada in 1998, she worked in various survival jobs for several years. She then had professional careers. She was the Persian bibliographer at Sterling Library (Yale University). She also taught Persian language and literature at University of Toronto and York University, and essay writing at Seneca College. As a member of PEN Canada, she was a fellow at Massey College and a lecturer-in-residence at George Brown College. Listen to the Reed, a chapbook based on her dialogue with the Canadian award-winning writer Karen Connelly, was published by PEN Canada in 2005. Molavi has had readings in Sweden, France, US, and Canada. She has appeared in many Persian and English anthologies, among them, Speaking in Tongues and TOK. Since 2009 she has published two novels, three collections of short stories, and one collection of essays in Iran. One of the novels, Dow pardeh-ye fasl (The Departures of Seasons), was admired by the Mehregan Literary Award (Tehran, 2012). Due to censorship in Iran, her two collections of essays and short stories -- An sal’ha, in jostar’ha (Those Years, These Essays) and Sangsar-e Tabestan (Stoning Summer) -- and her novella, Tarikkhaneh-ye Adam (Adam’s Darkroom), have been released in Europe. Likewise, Molavi has recently published Panjah-o-chizi kam (The Collected Stories), Az digar'ha (her fourth collection of essays) and Kamin bud (her sixth novel) in Toronto. Her first novel in English, Thirty Shadow Birds, was published in Canada by Inanna Publications. Writing in Persian and English, Molavi now lives in Toronto and divides her time among writing, organizing and running literary events like Tehranto Book-of-the Month Club and CafeNevisa (Toronto Persian Writing Group with Fereshteh Molavi) and advocating freedom of speech and human rights in Iran.

== Major works ==
- Az digar'hs [On Other Matters] (collection of essays, 2023)
- Panjah-o-chizi kam [The Collected Stories] (2022)
- Kamin bud [In the Beginning Was the Ambush] (novel, 2022)
- Thirty Shadow Birds. Toronto. Inanna, 2019 (novel)
- Tarikkhaneh-ye Adam [Adam’s Darkroom] (novella, 2016)
- Sangsar-e tabestan [Stoning of Summer] (collection of short stories, 2015)
- Az neveshtan [On Writing] (collection of essays, 2014)
- Zard-khakestari [Yellow-Grey] (collection of short stories, 2012)
- Hala key banafsheh mikari? [Narrative from April to March] (novel, 2012. Reprinted, 2014)
- Khaneh-ye abr-o-bad [The House of Cloud and the Wind] (novel, 1991. Reprinted, 2011)
- Dow pardeh-ye fasl [The Departures of Seasons] (novel, 2010)
- Sagha va adamha [Of Mutts & Men] (collection of short stories, 2010)
- An salha in jostarha [Those Years, These Essays] (collection of personal essays, 2010. Reprinted, 2014)
- Bobol-e sargashteh [The Wandering Nightingale] (collection of short stories, 2005)
- Listen to the Reed: A Dialogue Between Karen Connelly & Fereshteh Molavi That Took Place in 2003 and 2004 (2005)
- Fehrest-e mostand-e asami-ye mashahir va mo’alefan [The Name Authority List of Authors and Famous People] (editor, 1997, 2 v.)
- Bagh-e Irani [The Persian Garden] (1995)
- Narenj-o-toranj [The Orange and the Bergamot] (1992)
- Pari-ye aftabi [The Sun Fairy] (collection of short stories, 1991)
- Ketabshenasi-ye dastan-e kutah [A Bibliography of Short Stories] (1991)

== Links to Some Works ==
- “Jardin Persan” in La Revue de Teheran
- “The Ravine” in Maple Tree Literary Supplement
- “That Song" in Ascent Aspirations”
- “Listen to the Reed” in ICORN
- “Iranian Women Writers and Their Narratives” in Gozaar
