= Mohammad Hadi Saleh =

Prominent Iraqi guerilla fighter

Comrade Adnan Mohammad Hadi Saleh
- محمد هادي صالح (عدنان)
- Adnan whilst serving as temporary co-military commander of Battalion 15 during the mid-1980s
- Born: June 15, 1947; Baghdad, Iraq
- Died: September 12, 2026 (aged 79); Hvidovre, Denmark
- Resting place: Muslim Section 22, Vestre Cemetery, Copenhagen, Denmark
- Other names: Adnan (عدنان); Munir (منير); Abu Adel (أبو عادل)
- Citizenship: Iraq • Denmark
- Education: Patrice Lumumba Peoples' Friendship University
- Occupation: Labour activist • Specialist physician • Guerrilla • Politician
- Political party: Iraqi Communist Party (1958–2026)
- Movement: National Union Front (1958); Patriotic Forces (1958–1963); ICP resistance (1963–1973); Iraqi opposition (1979–2003)
- Spouse: Suaad Issa
- Children: Shuruk, Adel, Safa
- Parent(s): Hadi Saleh (father), Basaad Ubaid (mother)
- Military career
- Allegiance: Iraqi Communist Party
- Branch: Iraqi Communist Partisans
- Rank: Lieutenant colonel (The equivalent of Muqaddam in the Iraqi Armed Forces & Pêşkar in the Peshmerga)
- Unit: Battalion 15
- Commands: Temporary co-military commander
- Conflicts: Al-Ansar insurgency (1981–1986)
- Awards: Al-Ansar Medal of Honor: For outstanding deeds and for exceptional service, courage, steadfastness, and self-sacrifice displayed under circumstances of extreme danger.
- Adnan's voice Adnan speaking in the documentary series Partisans' Memory, Episode 53: Partisan Anecdotes released in 2018

Mohammad Hadi Saleh Al-Mafraji (Arabic: محمد هادي صالح المفرجي; 15 June 1947 – 12 September 2026), known by the two noms de guerre Adnan (Arabic: عدنان) and Munir (Arabic: منير), as well as by the kunya Abu Adel(Arabic: أبو عادل), was an Iraqi revolutionary, Marxist labour activist, guerrilla, Soviet-educated specialist physician, and member of the Iraqi Communist Party, whose political outlook combined Marxism with Iraqi patriotism (waṭaniyya).During the party's armed struggle in northern Iraq, Adnan served as combat medic with the Iraqi Communist Partisans and later also assumed the roles of political officer and temporary co-military commander of Battalion 15.

He later served as a representative of the Iraqi Communist Party in the Soviet Union and subsequently in Denmark, where he remained active in the party and among former Iraqi communist partisans. He was responsible for the Danish branch of the Iraqi Communist Partisans Association for some time. He died in Denmark on 12 September 2026 following a heart attack.

== Early life and family ==
Adnan was born in Al-Kadhimiya, Baghdad, on 15 June 1947. He grew up in a family deeply involved in the Iraqi Communist movement. His father, Hadi Saleh Al-Mafraji, was known by the nom de guerre Matrouk and the kunya Abu Adnan. He was named Matrouk—literally meaning 'the one left behind'—as he grew up fatherless after his father was killed in the Battle of the Diyala River in March 1917 during World War I, fighting on the Ottoman side against the British forces. Adnan's mother, Basaad Ubaid Al-Mafraji, known by the kunya Umm Adnan, came from a modest agricultural family. His younger siblings Munira and Yusuf, the latter known by the kunya Abu Dhafar, also became involved in the communist movement.

The political environment of Adnan's childhood was closely connected to clandestine party activity. The family home was used for communist meetings, while Umm Adnan helped conceal the gatherings from the security services. She prepared food and tea for party members attending meetings and used everyday household activities, including tending the family's goat outside the house, as cover while observing the movements of security personnel monitoring the residence.

Adnan therefore grew up in a household that frequently changed residence in connection with clandestine political activity. When the family moved, Umm Adnan concealed party printing equipment among their belongings. She also participated in communist demonstrations, concealing party banners beneath her abaya before displaying them during marches.

His father's political activity was another prominent feature of Adnan's early environment. Matrouk was a communist textile worker and labour activist in Baghdad. His clandestine political activities attracted considerable attention from the Iraqi security services, which regarded his presence in different provinces with apprehension and frequently associated the discovery of underground political leaflets with him.

Matrouk spent substantial periods in Iraqi prisons under successive governments, from the monarchy through the first republic and later Ba'athist rule, including periods of detention at Hillah Prison and the infamous Qasr al-Nihaya (literally ‘Palace of the End’), a detention and torture facility described by Martin Amis in The Guardian as ‘perhaps the most feared destination in Iraq until its demolition’.

During his imprisonment, Matrouk and his fellow prisoners engaged in political education and self-study, turning their places of detention into centres of political discussion and learning. He sustained lasting physical scars from repeated torture, Adnan himself would later experience imprisonment alongside him. Matrouk’s reputation for defiance of the security services endured beyond his death by the end of 1990s, as clandestine leaflets continued to bear the hallmarks of his writing and political style, continuing to frustrate the intelligence agents who had pursued him throughout his life. During the 1950s, Matrouk headed a clandestine textile workers' union in Baghdad and participated in opposition to the monarchy until its fall following the 14 July Revolution.

=== Resistance against the monarchy ===
Adnan's childhood coincided with a period in which his father was deeply involved in the Iraqi Communist Party's clandestine opposition to the monarchy. By 1949–1950, former General Secretary Bahauddin Nuri identified Matrouk as one of six leading working-class communists involved in rebuilding the party's organisational networks following a period of severe repression.

In 1953, when Adnan was six years old, Matrouk accompanied Salam Adil and his newly married wife, Thamina Naji Yusuf, from Baghdad to Basra as a security liaison while Adil took up clandestine party work in southern Iraq. Travelling under conditions of secrecy, they were met at Basra railway station by the worker-cadre, Abdullah Hatim and moved to a working-class safe house, from which Adil began rebuilding the party organization among oil, port and other workers. Clandestine communications between Baghdad and Basra involved transporting party publications and correspondence concealed inside bedding, including blankets and pillows. Amid heightened surveillance, Matrouk arranged for a young courier from Al-Qosh named Ibrahim to travel alongside Matrouk's elderly mother, who was entrusted with delivering sensitive party documents to senior members in hiding.

The clandestine party network to which Adnan’s family belonged also placed Matrouk close to internal developments within the Iraqi Communist Party. In 1954, Matrouk served as a trusted liaison between Salam Adil, then a member of the Middle Euphrates regional organization, and General Secretary Hamid Uthman during an internal power dispute over the party's leadership and direction. Matrouk carried correspondence and mediated between the two men as the dispute intensified. Adil subsequently succeeded Uthman as General Secretary in 1955.

During the same period in which Adnan was growing up in Baghdad, Matrouk advanced within the Party organization. By August 1955, Salam Adel considered Matrouk as a candidate for membership of the Iraqi Communist Party's Central Committee. In 1956, he became a leading member of the Iraqi Communist Party's Middle Euphrates Regional Committee, alongside cadres including Farhan Ta'ma, Saleh al-Raziqi, Abd al-Amir Hassoun, who were responsible for party organizations across the region.

Adnan became involved in clandestine party work already as a child, carrying secret correspondence between party organisations, imprisoned communists and the party leadership. Through this work, he developed familiarity with underground communication and security practices. Matrouk, himself a senior communist organiser, was initially unaware that Adnan had joined the party and discovered his membership by chance during an organisational transfer.

The political circumstances of the family changed following the 14 July Revolution of 1958, when Adnan was eleven years old and the monarchy was overthrown. During the subsequent period of relative political openness, Matrouk was among the party leadership involved in seeking legal recognition of the Iraqi Communist Party through Ittihad al-Shaab under the government of Abd al-Karim Qasim. On 9 January 1960, his name appeared as number 38 in the published list of applicants submitted to the Ministry of Interior.

=== 1963 coup and imprisonments ===
Adnan in Baghdad before his first imprisonment in 1963 (left image) and following his release in 1968 (right image), showing the change in his physical appearance during the intervening years

Following the February 1963 coup, the political repression that had long affected Adnan's family intensified. Members of the National Guard occupied the family home and monitored visitors, while Umm Adnan used her younger children to warn approaching visitors that the house was under surveillance. During this period, she travelled between prisons, detention centres and security offices seeking information about her husband, Adnan and other detained family members and party activists. She was also active through the Iraqi Women's League.

Adnan was arrested by the National Guard following the February 1963 coup and was subjected to torture during his detention. He was released following Abd al-Salam Arif's overthrow of the Ba'athists in November 1963 coup and subsequently resumed clandestine Communist Party activities, including work within its labour organisation. During this period, he also worked at a printing press, assuming responsibility for its operations after approximately six months.

Adnan was arrested again in late 1964 and remained imprisoned until late 1968. During his imprisonment, he continued his education, passing an external examination for the third year of intermediate school. Amongst the prisoners, Adnan gained popularity for his innovation, amongst them a wool-knitting apparatus for their torn clothing.

In 1965, he was joined by his father Matrouk, as they were among communist detainees held by the General Security Directorate in Baghdad. Published records of the political prisoners detained following the February 1963 coup also list Matrouk as having received a three-year prison sentence. They were later separated, with Matrouk transferred with other detainees to Military Prison No. 1 and subsequently to the Fadhiliya detention camp. During the transfer process of communist prisoners, Central Committee member Tawfiq Ahmad escaped while detainees were being handed over inside the Ministry of Defence. Although held separately, both Matrouk and Adnan were subjected to severe physical and psychological torture in connection with each other's imprisonment.

During his imprisonment at Fadhiliya, Matrouk was reunited with fellow communist activist Thabit Habib al-Ani, who had known him since the 1950s. The two attempted to dig a tunnel to escape the detention camp. Their imprisonment coincided with political disagreements among communist detainees following the party's 1967 split, which divided the prisoners into competing factions. The recaptured detainees were subsequently transferred to the notorious Nugrat al-Salman while taking part in a hunger strike against the transfer which lasted 26 days.

In 1967, Matrouk was amongst communist political prisoners at Hillah Central Prison preparing a mass escape through a tunnel beneath the prison complex. The original proposal involved excavating from the prison kitchen, but the location was abandoned because it was overlooked by a guard post. Instead, the prisoners selected a small dispensary in the prison's newer compound, where a disused drainage channel provided a starting point for excavation. Beginning in July 1967, four prisoners worked on the tunnel using improvised implements, including spoons, screwdrivers and small picks. The excavation was restricted to approximately two hours a day because of the intense heat, confined space and lack of ventilation underground. The completed tunnel, estimated at between fourteen and seventeen metres in different accounts, led towards a vehicle garage adjoining the prison's outer wall.

Concealing the excavated earth became one of the principal challenges. The prisoners initially packed the soil into sugar and flour sacks, wooden containers and discarded tins, until the dispensary could no longer accommodate the growing quantities. They subsequently arranged for the prison administration to supply earth for the purported repair of leaking roofs, allowing the excavated soil to be mixed with the material used for the repairs. The operation narrowly escaped discovery during an inspection by the Director General of Prisons, who approached the locked dispensary and placed his hand on its padlock. When an accompanying official described the room as an abandoned toilet, the inspection continued without the door being opened.

The operation was interrupted by the Iraqi Communist Party's split in September 1967. Political disagreements between prisoners loyal to the Central Committee and supporters of the breakaway Central Command escalated into confrontations, temporarily halting excavation for approximately one month. The rival groups subsequently resumed preparations, although later participants disputed responsibility for the planning and timing of the escape. On 6 November 1967, shortly before the fiftieth anniversary of the October Revolution, forty prisoners escaped through the tunnel into the neighbouring garage. According to a statement subsequently attributed to the Director General of Prisons, the escape occurred at approximately 5:30 p.m., after activity in the garage had diminished. Some prisoners boarded a passenger vehicle arriving from Najaf, passing themselves off as ordinary travellers, while a guard subsequently noticed other prisoners emerging from the garage and discovered the tunnel.

The escape prompted a search for the fugitives and a decision by the authorities to close Hillah Central Prison. Fourteen of the forty prisoners were reportedly recaptured. The published list of escapees includes a prisoner named Hadi Saleh, Matrouk's real name, recorded as serving a three-year prison sentence.

=== Communist divisions of the 1960s ===
The political environment surrounding Adnan and his family remained unstable after his imprisonment in the 1960s. In September 1967, when Adnan was twenty years old, the Iraqi Communist party underwent a major split in which a substantial part of its Baghdad organization broke away under Aziz al-Hajj and formed the Iraqi Communist Party – Central Command with Malik Mansur. The division affected the party network which Adnan's family belonged, and his father Matrouk remained aligned with the weakened Central Committee grouping led by General Secretary Aziz Muhammed.

The split effectively left three principal groupings represented among the communists around Matrouk: the Central Committee grouping with which he remained aligned; the Central Command associated with Aziz al-Hajj and Malik Mansur; and a third grouping associated with Salim al-Fakhri and the earlier Revolutionary Committee.

In the years following the split, the Central Committee sought to preserve organizational continuity and reconnect party structures disrupted by repression and factional division. After Matrouk escaped prison, he became involved in the rebuilding effort starting with Al-Kadhimiya, the Baghdad district in which Adnan had grown up.

A troika of Ali Armash, Abd al-Khaliq Zangana and Matrouk helped reconnect local party organizations, restore clandestine contacts and strengthen security procedures. With the later assistance of Hikmat Kutani and Shawkat Ibrahim, these efforts contributed to rebuilding local organization and reconnecting members separated by the earlier divisions. Adnan would later continue his own political activity within the Iraqi Communist party, although his subsequent path took him to the Soviet Union and, eventually, to the party's armed partisan movement in northern Iraq.

=== Soviet education and return to Iraq ===
Following his release from prison in late 1968, Adnan resumed his activities within the Iraqi Communist Party's labour organisation. During a renewed campaign of arrests in the early 1970s, he was sought by the security authorities while preparing for his final secondary-school examinations. Adnan avoided arrest by staying at a friend's house near the examination centre and travelling cautiously to the examinations, which he subsequently passed.

He left Iraq for the Soviet Union in the early 1970s and studied medicine at Patrice Lumumba Peoples' Friendship University in Moscow. He later qualified as a specialist physician Adnan spent much of the 1970s in Moscow with his wife Suaad, a fellow party cadre later known by the kunya Umm Adel.

While studying medicine in Moscow, Adnan remained active in the Iraqi Communist Party's student organisation. Adnan combined his medical studies with organisational responsibilities involving Iraqi students affiliated with the party across the Soviet Union. He was subsequently elected to lead the organisation at the Soviet Union-wide level.

Meanwhile, in Iraq, the authorities' continued interest in Matrouk also affected his children. In 1977, Adnan's younger brother Yusuf was detained at the Baghdad Security Directorate. After approximately ten days of interrogation, officials discovered that he was Matrouk's son and that the security services maintained an extensive dossier on his father. Yusuf was subsequently transferred to the General Security Directorate, where he underwent further interrogation and was subjected to severe torture. The experience ultimately led Yusuf to join the armed struggle.

Amid increasing repression of the Iraqi Communist Party and the consolidation of Saddam Hussein's rule in 1979, also Adnan decided to return to Iraq. Shortly after the birth of his eldest son Adel, he left his family and joined the party's armed opposition.

== Iraqi Communist Partisans ==
Adnan's journey to join the Iraqi Communist Partisans began in Qamishli, Syria, from where he travelled with a group of more than twenty-five comrades through Turkish territory towards the party's bases in Bahdinan, northern Iraq. The journey lasted approximately ten days. Although the group encountered no serious medical emergencies, several members suffered from blistered feet, exhaustion, dehydration and muscle cramps, requiring periods of rest along the route.

By early 1981, Adnan was serving as combat medic with the Iraqi Communist Partisans. His medical work included treating wounded and sick partisans and civilians, performing surgical procedures under field conditions and providing care in surrounding villages with limited medicines and equipment. Adnan also treated combatants from both allied and opposing fighters.

Adnan's early medical service included several months at the partisan base at Rost. He performed surgical procedures and treated both partisans and local residents in makeshift clinics established by the guerrillas. Partisan histories also note that physicians and medical personnel sometimes accompanied combat detachments during operations and patrols.

=== First life-saving surgery ===
From right to left: Adnan with Salem George, Saman Ahmad Bani Khaylani, Mohanad Al-Barrak in Pasht Ashan, Iraq - December, 1981

In December 1981, while serving as a combat medic with the Iraqi Communist Partisans at Pasht Ashan, Adnan performed emergency surgery on fellow partisan Salem George (Adel Mukhlis), following an accidental shooting. George had been cleaning his personal weapon in the headquarters platoon's quarters when several shots struck his left leg, shattering approximately 17 centimetres of bone. Adnan, whose first partisan nom de guerre was Munir, had recently arrived from Bahdinan and was due to continue to the Nawzank base. He responded immediately alongside Najah al-Ammar (nom de guerre: Abu Roza) and Tariq Mohammed Nazar (nom de guerre: Bahaa).

After examining George and administering first aid, Adnan informed the company leadership that the injuries were severe and that immediate surgery was necessary to control the bleeding and remove shattered bone fragments. Evacuation to Nawzank was considered too dangerous to delay treatment. Despite shortages of surgical instruments, medicines, and anaesthetics, Adnan decided to operate. Adnan jokingly and sarcastically remarked, "Good thing we have one anaesthetic injection." A corner of the headquarters room was converted into an improvised operating area, with plastic sheeting covering the walls, a small generator providing lighting, and hot water and heating supplied throughout the procedure.

Assisted by al-Ammar and Nazar, Adnan operated for several hours, removing fragments of shattered bone from George's leg. Following the operation, Adnan warned that George remained in critical condition and continued monitoring him throughout the night. Medical supplies, including intravenous fluids, bandages, and medicines, had arrived by mule convoy only two days before the accident. The physicians believed that their last-minute availability had saved his life.

A medical detachment subsequently arrived from Nawzank, bringing additional supplies requested by Adnan. It included Dr. Muhannad al-Barrak (nom de guerre: Dr. Sadiq) and Saman Ahmad Banikhlani (nom de guerre: Zamnako). Adnan and al-Barrak performed a further operation to clean the wounds and remove any remaining bone fragments. Afterwards, al-Haddad and Munir Sheetel Rumi (nom de guerre: Abu Basim) constructed a wooden support lined with blankets to immobilise George's injured leg in the absence of a plaster cast. George later credited Adnan with performing the initial surgical procedures and remaining at his bedside during the subsequent treatment, while also acknowledging the assistance of the other partisans.

Adnan later recalled that the operation had prevented George's leg from being amputated, although George continued to walk with a slight limp despite receiving further medical treatment abroad. Partisans described Adnan's composure and decision to operate under difficult circumstances as instrumental in reassuring the other partisans. They recalled Adnan joking with George and those assisting during the operation, despite the severity of the injuries. During the surgery, Adnan reassured George with a promise that he would outlive him—a promise that ultimately proved true many decades later. Adnan remained at Pasht Ashan only briefly before continuing his medical service in the Sulaymaniyah sector.

=== Joining Battalion 15 ===
After his brief stay at Pasht Ashan in December 1981, Adnan continued his medical service in the Sulaymaniyah sector, including the Nawzank area, before his subsequent attachment to Battalion 15, the Qara Dagh–Garmian formation of the Iraqi Communist Partisans. The battalion operated across Qara Dagh and Darbandikhan, with its activities extending towards Garmian and Khanaqin. A detachment of Battalion 15 was active in the Bartiyan area by mid-January 1982, although the battalion was not formally established until March 1982.

At its formal establishment, Battalion 15 was commanded militarily by Hama Rashid Qara Daghi, with Rauf Haji Muhammad (nom de guerre: Jawhar) serving as political officer and Suhail Zahawi (nom de guerre: Kamal) responsible for administration and finance.

During 1982, Battalion 15 combined armed operations with political and organizational activity throughout its area of operations. Its detachments conducted patrols and entered towns and villages including Bartiyan, Nujul, Qara Dagh and Darbandikhan, where they held meetings, distributed party literature and painted political slogans. During that period, the battalion clashed with government forces and government-aligned militias, attacked military and militia positions, and established temporary checkpoints on regional roads.

Adnan treating a wounded fighter from the opposing PUK forces during armed clashes in Qaradagh, Iraq - 1983

During a period of fighting between the communist partisans and the Patriotic Union of Kurdistan (PUK), local tribal representatives approached Adnan's unit seeking treatment for a man who had been shot in the back. Although the man's identity was initially withheld, he was later identified as a PUK fighter. Adnan and his medical assistant Walid treated the wound, which had become infected, while the bullet remained lodged near the lower spine. The patient was suffering from a high fever, intermittent loss of consciousness and paralysis of his lower body. After cleaning the wound and administering antibiotics, the doctors observed an improvement in his condition over the following days. Approximately one week later, they recommended transferring him to a government hospital for the removal of the bullet. Several months afterwards, Adnan received a letter from the patient, delivered by his cousin, reporting his recovery and rehabilitation through walking exercises, and expressing gratitude for the medical assistance he had received.

In May 1983, Adnan had finalised a whole medical station at Battalion 15's headquarters in the Qara Dagh area. Equipped with medicines, surgical instruments and medical personnel, which also provided free treatment to villagers from surrounding communities. Villagers brought eggs and dairy products as gifts for treatment of patients, knowing that the medical station did not charge for consultations or medicines.

=== Leadership crisis and reorganisation ===
The aftermath of the Battle of Pasht Ashan in May 1983 intensified political and organisational divisions within the Iraqi Communist Party, particularly in its Sulaymaniyah–Kirkuk sector. The fighting between the communist partisans and the Patriotic Union of Kurdistan (PUK) resulted in substantial casualties and exposed disagreements over the party's involvement in armed conflicts between Kurdish organisations. Bahauddin Nuri (nom de guerre: Abu Salam), who headed the sector, opposed involving communist forces in these confrontations and advocated negotiations with the PUK. However, other party leaders, including Ahmed Bani Khaylani, criticised his response to the fighting and his relations with the PUK leadership. The disagreements subsequently developed into a wider dispute over military strategy, political authority and the direction of the partisan movement.

According to Bahauddin Nuri's account, representatives of the Sulaymaniyah–Kirkuk sector and the PUK signed the Diwana Agreement on 26 May 1983, intending to prevent further fighting between their forces. The agreement became a major source of controversy within the party. Nuri later maintained that he had authorised negotiations but that the sector's military officer, Abdullah Mullah Faraj (nom de guerre: Mullah Ali), had signed terms without his approval, particularly provisions restricting cooperation with other Kurdish organisations. Other partisan leadership instead criticised Nuri's leadership and regarded the agreement as evidence of political concessions to the PUK. The dispute was a part of a broader struggle involving competing political factions, accusations of disloyalty and threats of armed confrontation among former comrades.

The conflict culminated in Nuri's dismissal from his military and political responsibilities. A Political Bureau decision communicated on 25 August 1983 removed both him and Mullah Ali from the sector leadership and appointed Ahmed Bani Khaylani as its new head. Nuri characterised the decision as an attempt to suppress his proposed internal elections and make him responsible for the consequences of Pishtashan. Bani Khaylani, by contrast, described the reorganisation as necessary to restore party discipline and address divisions among the partisan formations. The dismissal was later criticized as a top-down decision that disregarded established democratic party procedures. The dispute continued after the leadership changes, contributing to further factional divisions within the sector.

The reorganisation also brought changes to the command structure of Battalion 15. The newly constituted sector leadership met at Kerejal and approved appointments to the battalion's military, political and administrative positions. Hama Rashid Qaradaghi was named military commander, while Adnan became the battalion's political officer and Abu Zaher assumed responsibility for administration. The appointments followed the wider leadership changes after Pasht Ashan and marked Adnan's assumption of a senior political position within the Qara Dagh–Garmian formation.

Following the leadership changes, the Sulaymaniyah–Kirkuk sector gradually regained operational stability, with political and military activities resuming across its formations. Adnan and Abu Zaher subsequently assumed joint responsibility for administering Battalion 15 during periods when Qaradaghi operated separately with a smaller armed detachment in the Shahrazur, Qara Dagh and Darbandikhan areas. The battalion had withdrawn from its earlier operating areas and established temporary positions at Khornuzan in the Suren Mountains.Before the changes, the formation comprised several companies whose members came from different regional and organisational backgrounds, contributing to internal disagreements and factional divisions. Under Adnan and Abu Zaher's administration, the battalion continued its activities from Khornuzan, maintained discipline, restoring unity amongst partisans, maintaining defensive positions and coordinating security arrangements with nearby Kurdistan Democratic Party forces, despite continuing pressure from Iraqi government forces.

=== Operations, September 1983–April 1984 ===
Despite the political and organisational disruption, Battalion 15 continued participating in military operations alongside other partisan formations. On 25 September 1983, Battalion 9 was surrounded by government and government-aligned forces at Suyla Mish in the Shahrazur plain. A relief force from Battalion 15, together with a force from the Sulaymaniyah–Kirkuk sector headquarters and allied organizations, reached the area during the fighting and helped Battalion 9 withdraw toward safer positions. Two Battalion 9 partisans were killed and three others were captured and later executed.

Following the fighting around Pasht Ashan and Suyla Mish, Battalion 15 was reorganized geographically, with elements moving toward Shimiran, east of Lake Darbandikhan, and Khornuzan. Further fighting around Suyla Mish and Jabal Ahmad Burno was followed by a withdrawal of communist partisan forces toward Ahmad Awa and Mount Suren.

During a period in which Hama Rashid Qara Daghi operated with a smaller detachment in the country around Shahrazur, Qara Dagh and Darbandikhan, Adnan and the battalion's administrative officer Abu Zaher jointly assumed responsibility for running the battalion as co-military commanders.

Battalion 15 continued political and military operations in 1984. On 24 April, a Battalion 15 force and peshmerga belonging to the Khanaqin local organization of the Kurdistan Democratic Party toured villages in Shahrazur, holding meetings and distributing political literature.

=== Spies within the ranks of the partisans ===
In 1984, during a general meeting of partisan battalions and party cadres, Mohammad al-Saadi, known by his nom de guerre Latif, privately approached Adnan with information concerning several detainees suspected of links to the Ba'athist security services. A later critical review of al-Saadi's memoir by researcher Khairallah Saeed described Adnan as "one of the party leaders". Latif had earlier seen Dr. Salar leading some of the prisoners toward a nearby village. When Latif returned to the partisan headquarters, he learned that the detainees had reportedly escaped.

Latif considered this explanation implausible because the detention room was located in the centre of the headquarters near the kitchen, where other partisans were normally present. He told Adnan what he had seen and expressed his suspicion that the prisoners had been deliberately helped out of detention.

When Ahmad Bani Khaylani later addressed the meeting and discussed the danger posed by the reported escape, Adnan raised the information he had received from Latif and questioned whether the prisoners had in fact escaped unaided. According to Latif's account, the discussion then shifted from the circumstances of the prisoners' disappearance to the source of the allegation. The leadership became angry with Latif, subjected him to punishment and ostracism, and transferred him from the sector headquarters to Hazarstun.

Latif later presented the episode as part of what he regarded as a broader problem of penetration of communist networks by Ba'athist security services. He alleged that some individuals who had cooperated with the security services concealed that fact and remained within party structures. His account did not establish who had facilitated the detainees' disappearance or whether senior party leaders had authorized their release.

=== Operations, June–July 1984 ===
On 11–12 June 1984, the battalion's 4th Company attacked the al-Jakhur outpost between Qara Tapa and Jalawla while a second group established an ambush on the road to prevent reinforcements from reaching the position. The partisan account does not provide government casualty figures and states that government forces subsequently shelled the surrounding area.

On 12 July 1984, the Martyr Soran detachment of Battalion 15's 10th Company entered Darbandikhan, distributed party publications and posters, and painted political slogans on buildings in the town.

=== Kidnapping of two Germans ===
In mid-October 1984, while serving with the Iraqi Communist Partisans in the Sulaymaniyah–Kirkuk sector, Adnan became involved in an incident concerning two German nationals who had been detained by partisan forces while working in the Sulaymaniyah area. Contemporary partisan accounts described both men as engineers, while Adnan later distinguished between one of the men as a worker and the other as an engineer.

The detention was referred to the party leadership, which subsequently decided that the two Germans were to be released. While arrangements were being made to escort them out of the partisan-controlled area, they remained at the rear headquarters of the Sulaymaniyah–Kirkuk sector. Shortly before their planned departure, the Germans were taken with the partisans on a farewell excursion to the Zalm waterfall near Ahmad Awa.

The following day, Adnan travelled to the sector headquarters at Kerejal, in the Suren Mountains overlooking the Ahmad Awa area, to attend a meeting. During the midday meal, the position came under artillery fire. Partisan Kamran Ahmad al-Masah, known by the nom de guerre Darwish, and both Germans were struck by shell fragments.

The wounded were brought into a cave being used as a shelter and improvised medical station. Adnan joined the other partisan physicians in treating the casualties with the limited medicines and equipment available in the mountains. Darwish died from his injuries. One of the Germans, whom Adnan later described as a worker, suffered a penetrating abdominal wound that caused severe internal bleeding. Despite attempts to treat him, he died several hours later.

The second German, whom Adnan described as an engineer, suffered less severe injuries. Adnan and the other physicians treated his wounds and he survived. Accounts of the incident identify several doctors as having been present or involved in treating the wounded, including Adnan and other physicians attached to the partisan forces in the Sulaymaniyah sector.

The incident occurred shortly before the Germans were due to leave the partisan-controlled area. Only the previous day, they had been taken to Zalm as part of a farewell before their planned release. Bani Khaylani later suggested that Saddam Hussein may have known of the Germans' presence and deliberately shelled the position in order to create an incident that would discredit the communist partisans. Following the bombardment, the surviving German was escorted out of the mountains and accompanied the body of his deceased colleague on the journey toward Sulaymaniyah, assisted by partisans and smugglers with communist sympathies.

Adnan later wrote that he learned from comrades in Germany that the surviving engineer subsequently published a book in which he described the incident.

=== Operations, December 1984–February 1985 ===
On 6 December 1984, the Baba Ali and Saeed Lala detachments attacked the ruling party organization headquarters in Qara Dagh using rockets and automatic weapons. The partisan force subsequently entered the town, distributed political literature and withdrew without reported losses.

Battalion 15 continued operating jointly with other Kurdish opposition forces in 1985. On 12 January 1985, Battalion 15 and Kurdistan Democratic Party Peshmerga attacked government positions at Handi Qul for approximately one hour using artillery and rockets. The partisan history reports substantial government losses but provides no numerical figure. On 28 February, the same combined force shelled other government positions for approximately 90 minutes; the source again reports significant losses without providing figures.

=== The fall of Khornuzan base ===
Following the withdrawal of communist partisan forces from parts of Shahrazur and Dukan, Battalion 15 established a temporary base at Khornuzan, situated in a deep valley between the sector headquarters at Kerejal and Battalion 9's positions at Banishar. During the leadership of Adnan and Abu Zaher, the Iraqi government forces were preparing an offensive against partisan positions along the Suren Mountains near the Iranian border. Despite reports from villagers and smugglers of increasing military activity, the partisans had not established adequate contingency arrangements for an attack.

Battalion 15 maintained defensive coordination with the Khanaqin organisation of the Kurdistan Democratic Party (KDP), whose forces occupied a neighbouring base in the Khornuzan valley. Under their arrangement, KDP fighters were responsible for guarding a fortified former Iraqi military outpost overlooking the principal approaches to the valley, while communist partisans maintained an exposed observation position approximately one kilometre away. During a night patrol, Abu Zaher, Latif, Ammar and Qasim, discovered that the KDP position had been abandoned. Abu Zaher organised the guard shifts, and at approximately 2 a.m., Latif observed Iraqi soldiers occupying the abandoned outpost and surrounding their position. After confirming the enemy's presence, Abu Zaher ordered an immediate withdrawal rather than attempting to engage the considerably larger force.

The four partisans withdrew under cover of darkness towards the Iranian border, warning other communist fighters of the approaching Iraqi Army. The decision prevented potentially substantial casualties among the partisans sleeping in the valley. By the following morning, Iraqi forces had occupied the headquarters and surrounding positions after combat and heavy bombardment, reportedly advancing along three axes from Sayyid Sadiq, Khurmal and Halabja.

Adnan's unit had withdrawn to a fallback position in a mountain cave after several hours of combat. At approximately 11 p.m., the position was under heavy artillery bombardment, which continued until around 4 a.m. Amid the shelling, Adnan heard kurdish fighters call for medical assistance from the partisans. Carrying his medical bag, he went alone to locate the casualties, deciding not to expose an assistant to the danger. He found three members of the Kurdistan Socialist Party (PASOK), one of whom had already been killed. Adnan treated the two surviving wounded fighters, controlled their bleeding and arranged for their subsequent evacuation to Iran for further treatment. He also reported treating other wounded members of the socialist forces during the fighting.

Baghdad Television subsequently broadcast footage of the captured partisan bases, portraying them as positions belonging to "agents of the Soviet Union" and "traitors to the Arab cause". A day after the broadcast of the Iraqi government operation against the base, The communist partisans subsequently re-entered the abandoned headquarters under cover of darkness to recover essential supplies, before withdrawing again.

The surviving partisans regrouped through Iranian territory before returning towards the sector headquarters at Kerejal. At a subsequent meeting attended by Ahmed Bani Khaylani and other commanders, the four members of the patrol were subjected to party and military disciplinary measures against "unecessary withdrawal", a withdrawal which saved the lives of the whole battalion. Punishment was never executed, due to continuing Iraqi offensive prevented their implementation.

A separate counterattack by Kurdistan Democratic Party forces against the fortified outpost failed, the KDP had launched a counterattack without coordination with the communist forces, failed to dislodge the Iraqi Army.

=== Family activity during the partisan years ===
In the autumn of 1985, Matrouk was among veteran communist activists contacted in the capital during efforts to re-establish clandestine party organization in Baghdad and other cities after another purge. Despite the effects of advancing age, poverty and difficult circumstances, he retained his political commitment and connections with communist activists.

Adnan's brother Yusuf Hadi was also involved with the communist movement and operated in the partisan areas of northern Iraq. During the mid-1980s, Umm Adnan travelled to the village of Takiya in northern Iraq to visit Yusuf during his time in the partisan areas. Such family visits were considered risky, and movement between the partisan areas and the cities was conducted clandestinely.

During her stay at Takiya, Umm Adnan sat outside the partisan headquarters looking towards Mount Sibin, a large grey mountain whose appearance reminded her of concrete. Umm Adnan, who came from a rural agricultural background and had received little formal education, asked whether the mountain had been built by the local peasants.

Adnan's sister Munira later travelled to the same area with her son, then around ten years old, to visit Yusuf and assist with clandestine work. By that time, repeated artillery fire and aerial bombardment had forced the partisans to leave their headquarters in the village and establish a reserve position several kilometres away inside a forest.

During Munira's visit, Iraqi Sukhoi aircraft bombed the surrounding villages and countryside. The aircraft dropped cluster munitions over an area extending from Sila through Takiya and Balkjar towards the village of Balkha. Families from nearby villages had fled their homes and sought shelter among rocks and in the forests. Munira was described as extremely frightened during the attack, while her young son reacted with excitement to the aircraft and explosions. Four Sukhoi aircraft participated in the bombing, and no deaths from the attack were reported in the account.

=== Later operations, November–December 1986 ===
Operations involving Battalion 15 continued in 1986. On 26 November, a Battalion 15 detachment, together with the Martyr Aso Company and the Martyr Hadi Company of Battalion 7, attacked government-aligned militia and Popular Army positions at the Sirwan complex and nearby outposts. The partisan account reports substantial losses among the opposing forces but gives no numerical total.

On 28 November 1986, the Baba Ali Company of Battalion 15 ambushed an Iraqi military IFA truck on the Darbandikhan–Jalawla road near Qatra. According to the partisan account, the vehicle was destroyed by fire, two soldiers were killed and several others were wounded. Government forces subsequently shelled the surrounding area.

On 3 December 1986, a combined force from Battalions 7 and 15, together with a detachment of the Kurdistan Socialist Party, took up positions near Tappa Kal during a government operation in Shahrazur. After coming under fire, the combined partisan force attacked government-aligned militia at Suyla Mish al-Sufla and Suwari, entered the two villages and recovered property which the partisan account states had been taken from local residents.

By the end of his partisan service in 1986, Adnan had attained the rank of muqaddam (مقدّم), equivalent to lieutenant colonel. His final period with Battalion 15 followed five years of service as a combat medic and political officer, during which he also temporarily shared responsibility for the battalion's military command.

== Later life ==
By the end of 1986, following a political reorganization of the partisan forces, Adnan was set to return for the Soviet Union. Arrangements were made for him to travel clandestinely from Turkey and then Iran. There Adnan's return to Moscow was complicated by a lack of travel documents, with assistance from fellow communists he went through Afghanistan, before finally reaching Moscow.

After rejoining his family, he resumed his medical studies to complete his specialist training. He also resumed his political activities and was subsequently elected head of the Iraqi Communist Party's organisation throughout the Soviet Union. In 1990, former General Secretary of the Iraqi Communist Party, Bahauddin Nuri passed through Moscow on his way to Sweden to seek political asylum and stayed with Adnan for several days. Adnan was expected to arrange Nuri's onward journey to Sweden. Adnan himself settled in Denmark in 1992.

He remained active in the Iraqi Communist Party in Denmark, serving two terms as the party's representative, and continued his involvement in organizations of former Iraqi communist partisans from the 1990s until his death. Among these was the Iraqi Communist Partisans Association in Denmark, whose Danish branch he led for a period. In 2013, he attended the seventh conference of the Iraqi Communist Partisans Association near Gothenburg, Sweden.

Adnan appeared in several episodes of the documentary series ذاكرة الأنصار (Partisans' Memory), including an episode devoted to partisan anecdotes and a two-part programme on medical services within the partisan movement, released between 2018 and 2019. In the medical programmes, he described the development of coordination between medical personnel in the Sulaymaniyah, Erbil and Bahdinan sectors, including conferences at which physicians discussed cases and treatment methods. He recalled that the partisan medical cadres expanded to include pharmacists, radiology personnel and dentists, and that a coordinating leadership for medical work in the military sectors was subsequently elected. He also described the establishment of small infirmaries at fortified partisan bases where wounded and sick personnel could remain for extended treatment, and recalled encounters with villagers during his medical work, including anecdotes that illustrated local social customs among agricultural communities and the trust they placed in partisan medical personnel.

== Writings ==
As political officer of Battalion 15, Adnan was also involved in the battalion's partisan press. In March 1984, Battalion 15 began publishing the periodical Sawt al-Ansar, which served the Sulaymaniyah–Kirkuk sector. Adnan contributed a medical column to the partisan press.

In 2009, Adnan published an article titled لقطات من الملتقى الفكري الثالث للشباب (Snapshots from the Third Intellectual Youth Forum) concerning a youth forum in Malmö; the article subsequently received a published response from Mohammad Hasaballah. In 2010, Hasaballah credited Adnan among those who contributed to the political theatre production الأنامل البنفسجية (The Purple Fingers).

In October 2025, Adnan published an account titled طبابة الانصار، نجاحات في ظروف قاسية (Partisan Medicine: Successes in Harsh Conditions), describing his experiences in the partisan medical service, including his time at Rost and with Battalion 15.

== Death ==
Adnan died in Denmark on 12 September 2026 following a heart attack. His death was announced by the Iraqi Communist Party organization in Denmark and by the Iraqi Communist Partisans Association and its Danish branch. The party's notice named his wife Suaad, known as Umm Adel, and his children Shuruk, Adel and Safa.

== See also ==
- Iraqi Communist Party
- Iraqi Communist Partisans
- Iraqi opposition (1979–2003)
