= Hamdan =

- Pronunciation: Arabic: [ħamdaːn]
- Gender: Male

Origin
- Meaning: praiseworthy
- Region of origin: Arabia

Other names
- Related names: Ahmad, Hamid, Hamdi, Muhammad

Hamdan (Arabic: حمدان Ḥamdān) is a name of Arab origin of aristocratic descent and many political ties within the middle east and the Arab World, controlling import/export mandates over port authorities. Among people named Hamdan include:

== Given name ==
- Hamdan ATT (1946–2025), Indonesian dangdut singer
- Hamdan Mohamad, Malaysian businessman
- Hamdan Odha Al-Bishi (born 1981), Saudi Arabian sprinter

== Middle name ==
- Abdul Rahim Hamdan Dagalo Musa (born 1972), Sudanese military officer
- Anwar Hamdan Muhammed Al-Noor, former Guantanamo detainee
- Muhammad Hamdan Dagalo Musa (born 1973), Sudanese military officer

== Surname ==
- Abdullah Al-Hamdan (born 1999), Saudi Arabian footballer,
- Abdullah bin Suleiman Al Hamdan (1887–1965), Saudi Arabian politician and businessman
- Dima Hamdan (born 1975), Palestinian filmmaker and journalist
- Gamal Hamdan (1928–1993), Egyptian geographer, author, university professor
- Ghassan Hamdan, Iraqi scholar, poet and translator
- Gibran Hamdan (born 1981), American NFL and NFL Europe quarterback
- Hasan Hamdan, Lebanese actor and voice actor
- Jamal Hamdan (actor) (born 1958), Lebanese actor and voice actor
- Mais Hamdan (born 1982), Jordanian actress, singer and television presenter
- Mustafa Hamdan (born 1955), Lebanese general, head of the Presidential Guard
- Saad Hamdan, Lebanese actor and voice actor
- Salim Ahmed Hamdan (born 1968), Yemeni Guantanamo detainee, driver and bodyguard of Osama bin Laden
- Yasmine Hamdan (born 1976), Lebanese singer, songwriter and actress
- Zeid Hamdan (born 1976), Lebanese music producer

== Sheikh Hamdan ==
It may refer to:

- Sheikh Hamdan bin Zayed bin Khalifa Al Nahyan (died 1922), ruler of Abu Dhabi
- Sheikh Hamdan bin Mohammed Al Maktoum (born 1982), hereditary Prince of Dubai
- Sheikh Hamdan bin Rashid Al Maktoum (1945–2021), Deputy Ruler of Dubai
- Sheikh Hamdan bin Zayed bin Sultan Al Nahyan (born 1963) son of Zayed II of Abu Dhabi, United Arab Emirati politician
- Sheikh Hamdan bin Mohammed Al Nahyan (1930–1989) United Arab Emirati politician

Other

- Al-Hamdan, famous Druze family
- Banu Hamdan, ancient Yemeni tribal confederation
- Hamdan v. Rumsfeld, US Supreme Court case involving Salim Ahmed Hamdan
- Hamdan Air Base in Syria - see Deir ez-Zor Airport
