= Qara Tapa =

- Town
- Location in Iraq
- Coordinates: 34°42′00″N 45°00′00″E
- Country: Iraq
- Governorate: Diyala Governorate
- District: Kifri District

Qara Tapa (Arabic: قرة تبة; Turkish: Karatepe) is a predominantly Shia Turkmen town in Diyala Governorate, Iraq. It is located south of Kifri. Its name is in the Turkmen dialect, meaning 'black hill'.

== History ==
In 1820, Claudius Rich visited Qara Tapa, describing it as a village populated by Turcomans. It had 700 houses in 1805 and had reduced to 75 due to fleeing from government oppression.

James Buckingham visited Qara Tapa in the 1820s, describing it as a Turkmen populated village. He estimated the town's size at half of Kifri, with a population of 1,000.
