= Davron (name) =

Davron or Davronjon is a given name. Davron may also be a surname. Notable people with the name include:

== Given name ==
- Davron Askarov (born 1988), Kyrgyz footballer
- Davron Atabaev (born 1993), Tajikistani sprinter
- Davronjon Ergashev (born 1998), Tajikistani footballer
- Davron Fayziev (born 1976), retired Uzbek footballer
- Davron Khashimov (born 1992), Uzbekistani footballer
- Davron Mirzaev (born 1989), Uzbekistani footballer
- Davronjon Tukhtasunov (born 1990), Tajikistani footballer

== Surname ==
- Khurshid Davron (born 1952), Uzbek poet, writer and translator

== See also ==
- Davron, commune in north-central France
- Nuriddin Davronov
