= Forugh Farrokhzad =

Iranian poet (1935–1967)

- فروغ فرخزاد
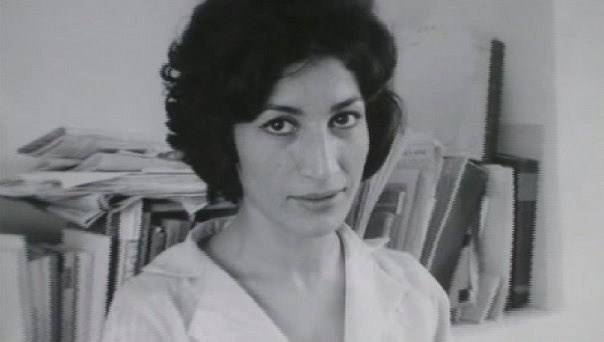
- Born: Foroghzaman Farrokhzād Arraghi; 29 December 1934; Tehran, Imperial Iran
- Died: 13 February 1967 (aged 32); Tehran, Imperial State of Iran
- Resting place: Zahir Dowleh Cemetery
- Occupations: Poet, filmmaker
- Spouse: Parviz Shapour (m. 1952; div. 1955)
- Partner: Ebrahim Golestan (1960–1967)
- Children: Kamyar; Hossein (adopted)
- Relatives: Fereydoun Farrokhzad (brother); Pooran Farrokhzad (sister)
- Writing career
- Notable works: The Captive (1955); Wall (1956); Rebellion (1958); Another Birth (1964)

Forugh Farrokhzad (Persian: فروغ فرخزاد; 29 December 1934 – 14 February 1967) was an influential Iranian poet and film director. She was a controversial modernist poet and an iconoclastic, feminist author. Farrokhzad died in a car accident at the age of 32.

== Early life and career ==
Forugh Farrokhzad was born in Tehran, Iran on 29 December 1934, to career military officer Colonel Mohammad Bagher Farrokhzad (the Persian Farrokhzad family originally hail from Tafresh) and his wife Touran Vaziri-Tabar. The fourth of seven children (the others being Amir, Massoud, Mehrdad, Fereydoun, Pooran, and Gloria), she attended school until the ninth grade, then was taught painting and sewing at a girls' school for the manual arts.

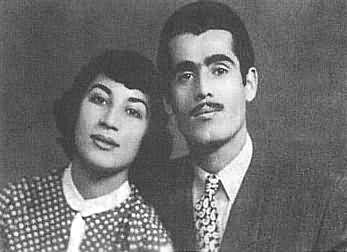
Farrokhzad and Parviz Shapour

At the age of 16, she was married to satirist Parviz Shapour. She continued her education with painting and sewing classes and moved with her husband to Ahvaz. Her only child, a son named Kamyar Shapour (subject of The Return), was born a year later.

"After her separation, and later her divorce (1954), from Parviz, she lost custody of her son because she had had several affairs. Her son Kamyar, whom she affectionately calls Kami, was taken away from her and brought up by Parviz and his family. Forugh was given very few visiting rights, and the child was brought up with the impression that his mother had abandoned him for poetry and the pursuit of her sexual pleasures. The thought of her son thinking that she willingly abandoned him was a source of great sorrow and constant torment for her."

The first volume of Farrokhzad's poetry, The Captive, was released in 1955. In September of that year, Farrokhzad was placed in a psychiatric clinic for a month following a nervous breakdown.

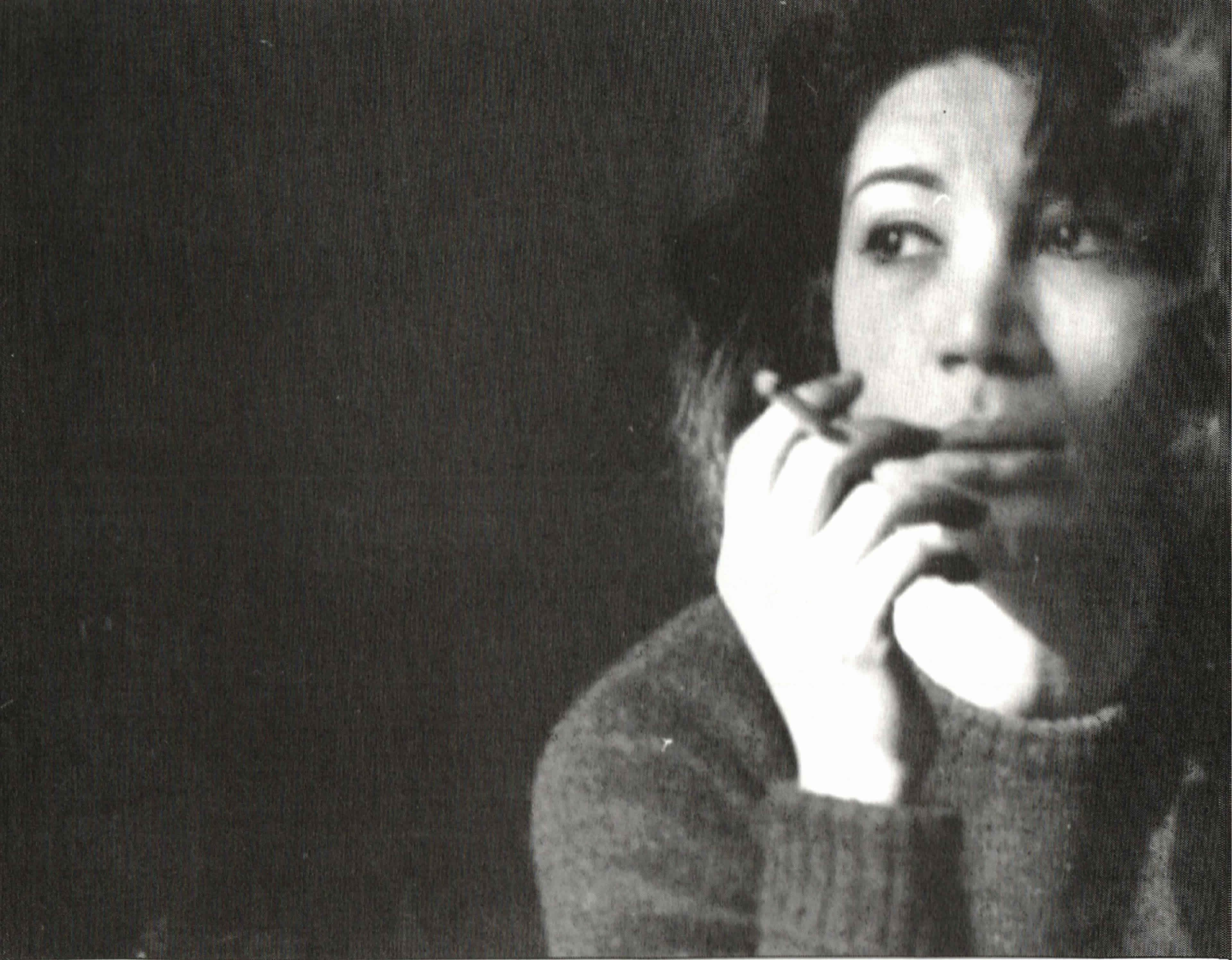
Farrokhzad

Farrokhzad spent nine months in Europe in 1958. After returning to Iran, in search of a job, she met filmmaker and writer Ebrahim Golestan, who reinforced her own inclinations to express herself and live independently, and with whom she began a love affair.

She published two more volumes, The Wall in 1956 and The Rebellion in 1958, before traveling to Tabriz to make a film about Iranians affected by leprosy. This 1962 documentary film, titled The House is Black, is considered to be an essential part of the Iranian New Wave movement. During the 12 days of shooting, she became attached to Hossein Mansouri, the child of two lepers. She adopted the boy and brought him to live at her mother's house.

She published Reborn, her fourth volume of poetry, in 1964. Her poetry at that time varied significantly from former Iranian poetic traditions.

== Feminine perspective in Farrokhzad's poetry ==
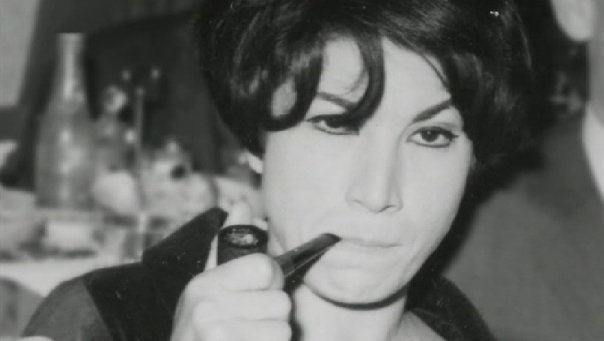
Farrokhzad in 1965

Farrokhzad's strong feminine voice became the focus of much negative attention and open disapproval, both during her lifetime and in the posthumous reception of her work.

In a radio interview, when asked about the feminine perspective in her poems, Farrokhzad replied:

If my poems, as you say, have an aspect of femininity, it is of course quite natural. After all, fortunately, I am a woman. But if you speak of artistic merits, I think gender cannot play a role. In fact, to even voice such a suggestion is unethical. It is natural that a woman, because of her physical, emotional, and spiritual inclinations, may give certain issues greater attention, issues that men may not normally address. I believe that if those who choose art to express their inner self, feel they have to do so with their gender in mind, they would never progress in their art -- and that is not right. So when I write, if I keep thinking, oh I'm a woman and I must address feminine issues rather than human issues, then that is a kind of stopping and self-destruction. Because what matters, is to cultivate and nourish one's own positive characteristics until one reaches a level worthy of being a human. What is important is the work produced by a human being and not one labelled as a man or a woman. When a poem reaches a certain level of maturation, it separates itself from its creator and connects to a world where it is valid based on its own merits.

Emphasizing human issues, she also calls for a recognition of women's abilities that goes beyond the traditional binary oppositions.

== Death ==
Farrokhzad died in a car accident on 14 February 1967, at the age of 32. Although the exact circumstances of her death have been the subject of much debate, the official story is that she swerved her jeep to avoid an oncoming school bus and was thrown out of her car, hitting her head against the curb. It was believed she died before reaching the hospital; however, Farzaneh Milani in her book, Forugh Farrokhzad: A Literary Biography with Unpublished Letters, cites an interview with Ebrahim Golestan who speaks about Farrokhzad's final moments where she died in his arms.

A posthumous collection of Farrokhzad's poetry titled "Let Us Believe in the Beginning of the Cold Season" was published in 1974.

== Legacy ==
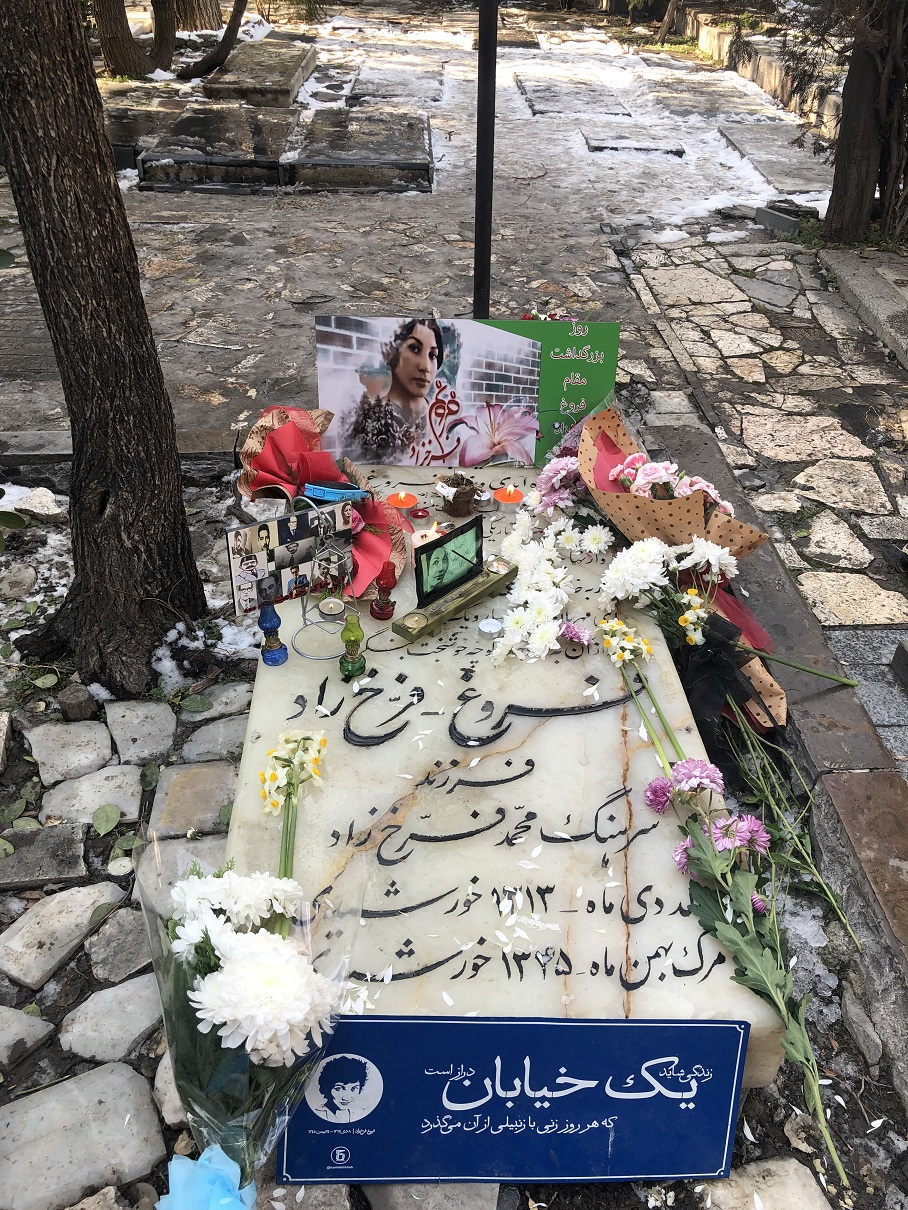
Grave of Forugh Farrokhzad at Zahir Dowleh Cemetery

Farrokhzad's poetry was banned for more than a decade after the Islamic Revolution. A brief literary biography of Farrokhzad, Michael Craig Hillmann's A Lonely Woman: Forough Farrokhzad and Her Poetry, was published in 1987. Farzaneh Milani's work Veils and Words: The Emerging Voices of Iranian Women Writers (1992) included a chapter about her. Abdolali Dastgheib, literary critic and writer, published a critical review of Farrokhzad's poems titled The Little Mermaid (Persian title: پری کوچک دریا) (2006) in which he describes Forugh as a pioneer in modern Persian poetry who symbolizes feminism in her work. Nasser Saffarian has directed three documentaries about her life: The Mirror of the Soul (2000), The Green Cold (2003), and Summit of the Wave (2004).

In February 2017, on the occasion of the 50th anniversary of Farrokhzad's death, the 94-year-old Golestan broke his silence about his relationship with her, speaking to Saeed Kamali Dehghan of The Guardian: "I rue all the years she isn't here, of course, that's obvious", he said, "We were very close, but I can't measure how much I had feelings for her. How can I? In kilos? In metres?"

== Translations of Farrokhzad's works ==
- Arabic: Mohammad Al-Amin, Gassan Hamdan
- Azerbaijani: Samad Behrangi
- English:
  - Sin- Selected Poem of Forugh Farrokhzad, edited and translated by Sholeh Wolpé (University of Arkansas Press) ISBN 978-1557289483 Recipient of Lois Roth Translation Award
  - Let Us Believe in the Beginning of the Cold Season, translated and edited by Elizabeth T. Gray, Jr., (New Directions Publishing, 2022) ISBN 978-0811231657.
  - Another Birth: Selected Poems, translated by Ali Salami, (Zabankadeh Publications, 2001) ISBN 978-9646117365.
  - Hasan Javadi and Susan Sallée translated Another Birth: Selected Poems of Forugh Farrokhzad with her letters and interviews in 1981. A revised edition of the same volume is published by Mage Publishers (Washington, DC) in 2010 as a bilingual edition.
  - Bride of Acacias: Selected Poems of Forugh Farrokhzad, translated by Jascha Kessler and Amin Banani, (Caravan Books, Delmar, N.Y., 1982) ISBN 0-88206-050-3.
  - A Rebirth: Poems, translated by David Martin, with a critical essay by Farzaneh Milani (Mazda Publishers, Lexington, Ky., 1985) ISBN 093921430X, including the poem "The Wind-Up Doll"
  - "I Pity The Garden" was included in The Green Book of Poetry edited by Ivo Mosley, (Frontier Publishing, Norfolk, 1993), later reprinted as Earth Poems: Poems From Around The World To Honor The Earth (HarperSanFrancisco, 1996) ISBN 0-06-251283-8.
- French: Mahshid Moshiri, Sylvie Mochiri (pen name: Sylvie M. Miller)
- Hebrew: Sivan Balslev
- German: Annemarie Schimmel
- Italian: Domenico Ingenito (ed.) Domenico Ingenito (ed.), Io parlo dai confini della notte. Forugh Farrokhzad: tutte le poesie (Milan: Bompiani, 2023)
- Kurdish: Haidar Khezri, It is Only Sound that Remains: The Life and Legacy of Forough Farrokhzad, with Translation of Two Collections of her Poetry ("Another Birth" and "Let Us Believe in the Beginning of the Cold Season"), published by Salahaddin University Press 2016.
- Nepali: Collected in Manpareka Kehi Kavita translated by Suman Pokhrel
- Polish: Barbara Majewska, Zofia Józefowicz-Czabak, Piotr Bachtin
- Russian: Viktor Poleshchuk
- Swedish: Namdar Nasser
- Turkish: Hashem Khosrow-Shahi, Jalal Khosrow-Shahi
- Urdu: Fehmida Riaz published by 'Sheherzade Publications' Karachi
- Uzbek:
  - Khurshid Davron published by "Qirq bir oshiq daftari" Tashkent
  - "Qayg'u guli", Tashkent, 2019-yil

== Bibliography ==
- Michael Craig Hillmann, A Lonely Woman: Forough Farrokhzad and Her Poetry (Three Continents Press, Washington, D.C., 1987). ISBN 0-934211-11-6, ISBN 978-0-934211-11-6.
- Domenico Ingenito (ed.), Io parlo dai confini della notte. Forugh Farrokhzad: tutte le poesie (Milan: Bompiani, 2023).

== Documentaries and other works ==
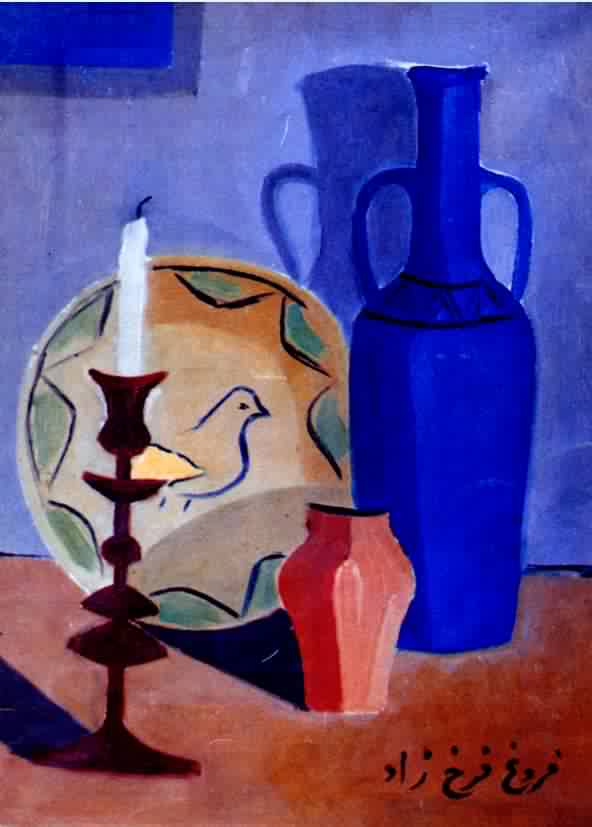
Painting by Forough Farrokhzad

- Only Voice Remains, English-language award-winning short experimental documentary about Forugh Farrokhzad using Sholeh Wolpe's translations. Directed by London-based filmmaker Makez Rikweda.
- I Shall Salute the Sun Once Again, English-language documentary about Forough Farrokhzad, by Mansooreh Saboori, Irandukht Productions 1998.
- Moon Sun Flower Game, German documentary about Forough Farrokhzad's adopted son Hossein Mansouri, by Claus Strigel, Denkmal-Film 2007.
- The Bride of Acacias, a play about Forough Farrokhzad by Ezzat Goushegir.
- Song of a Captive Bird, a novel about Forough Farrokhzad by Jasmin Darznik.

== See also ==
- Persian literature
- Mina Assadi
- Simin Behbahani
- List of Iranian women writers and poets
