= Latif Halmat =

Kurdish poet

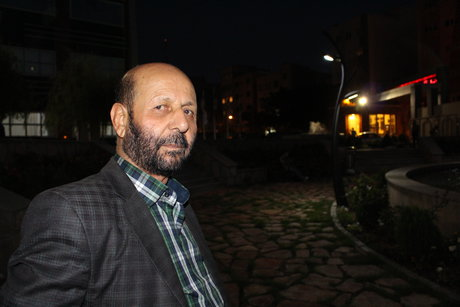
Latif Halmat

Latif Halmat (Kurdish: لەتیف ھەڵمەت, Letîf Helmet; born 1947) is a Kurdish poet. He was born in town of Kifri, Iraq and began writing poems in 1963. He worked as a journalist during the 1970s and 1980s. He has published 20 poetry books in Kurdish and many of his works have been translated into other languages. He has also been active in the area of children's literature and drama.

He has published several collections of poetry including "God and our little city" (1970), "Facing a rebirth" (1973), "The girl's hair is my tent in summer and winter" (1977), "The white storm" (1978), "The letters that my mother does not read" (1979), and "Finished and unfinished poems" (1979). He was one of the vanguards of the new wave of poets who focused on changing the language of poetry and modern literary techniques in the 1970s. His work has been influenced by renowned Arab poets such as Adunis and Maghut.

== See also ==
- List of Kurdish scholars
