= Dwelah =

Dwelah is a village in Diyala Governorate, Iraq, about 72 km north of Baghdad.

== 2007 militant attack ==
Dwelah was the location of a December 1, 2007, militant attack. Around 6:30 a.m., 50 to 60 suspected al-Qaida fighters showered a Shiite village with mortar rounds. Soon afterward, they began torching homes and forcing hundreds of families to flee. The villager death toll was 14: 9 men, 2 women, and 3 children. In addition, 3 militants died after Dwelahns fought back.
