= Ebrahim Golestan =

Iranian-British filmmaker and literary figure (1922–2023)

- ابراهیم گلستان
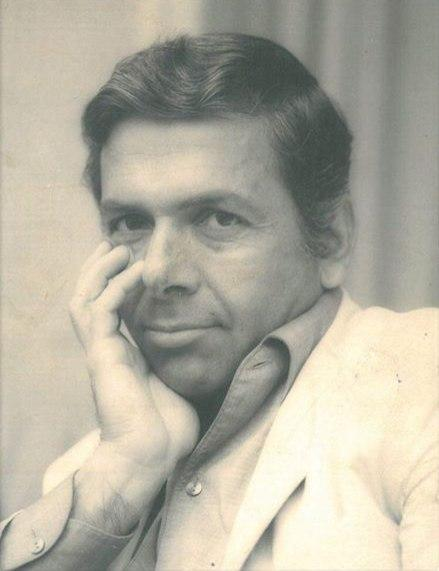
- Golestan in 1968
- Born: Ebrahim Taghavi Shirazi; 19 October 1922; Shiraz, Iran
- Died: 22 August 2023 (aged 100); Sussex, England
- Education: University of Tehran (unfinished)
- Occupations: Writer and director
- Spouse(s): Fakhri Golestan (m. 1942; died 2012) Ashraf Esfandiari (m. 2014)
- Partner: Forough Farrokhzad (1960–1967)
- Children: Leili and Kaveh
- Family: Mani Haghighi (grandson); Mehrak Golestan (grandson)

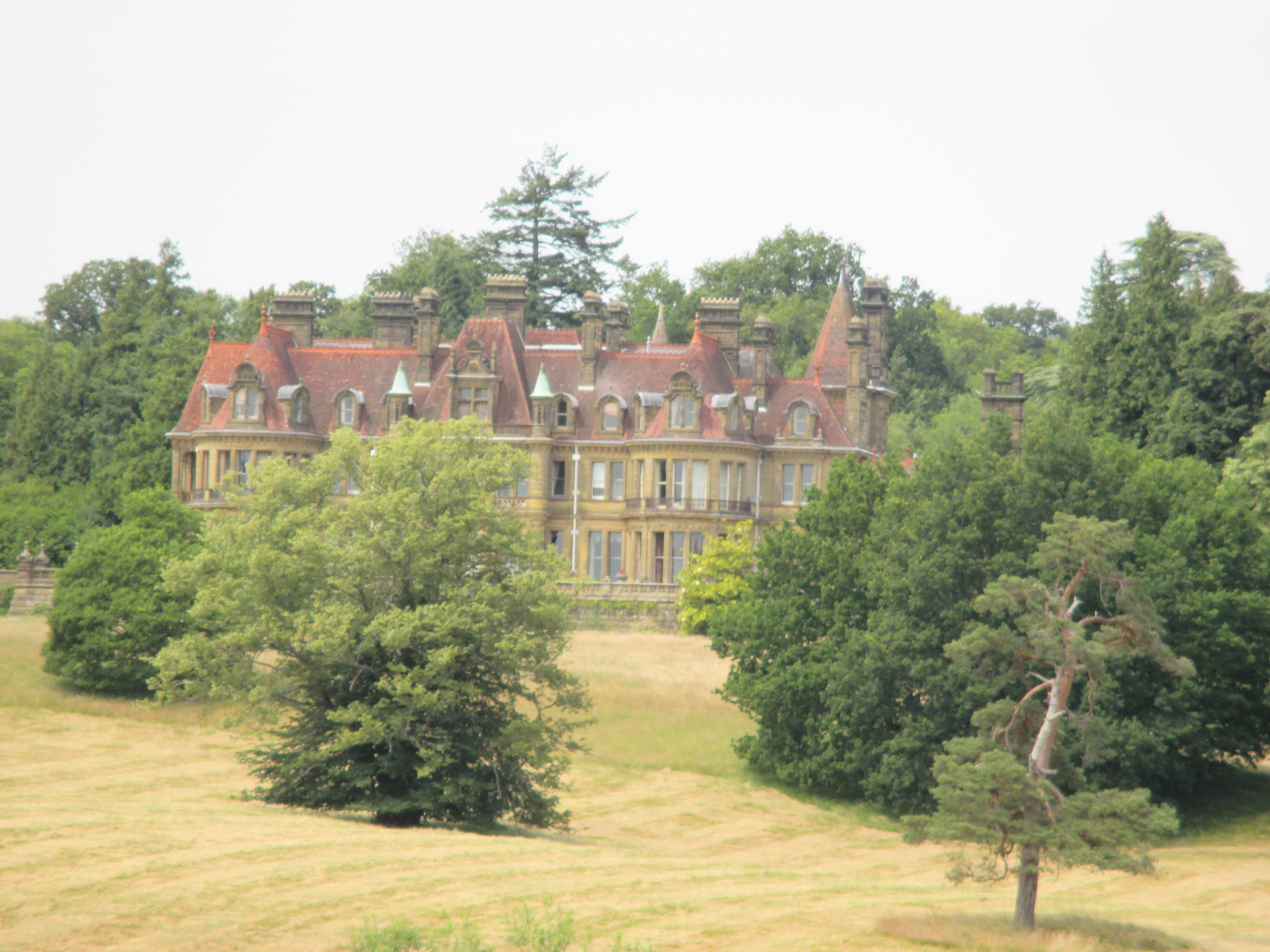
Wykehurst Place owned by Ebrahim Golestan

Ebrahim Taghavi Shirazi (Persian: ابراهیم گلستان, 19 October 1922 – 22 August 2023), known as Ebrahim Golestan, was an Iranian filmmaker and literary figure. Golestan met Iranian poet Forough Farrokhzad at his studio in 1958, and was closely associated with her until her death. He was said to have inspired her to live more independently. It could also be said that she inspired him in his artistic vision. He lived in Sussex, United Kingdom from 1975 until his death.

== Biography ==
Ebrahim Golestan was married to his cousin, Fakhri Taghavi Shirazi; their son was photojournalist Kaveh Golestan and their daughter was Lili Golestan, translator and owner and artistic director of the Golestan Gallery in Tehran, Iran. A grandson, Mani Haghighi, is also a film director. His other grandson, Mehrak, is a rapper.

Golestan was a member of the Tudeh Party of Iran, but broke away from the party in January 1948.

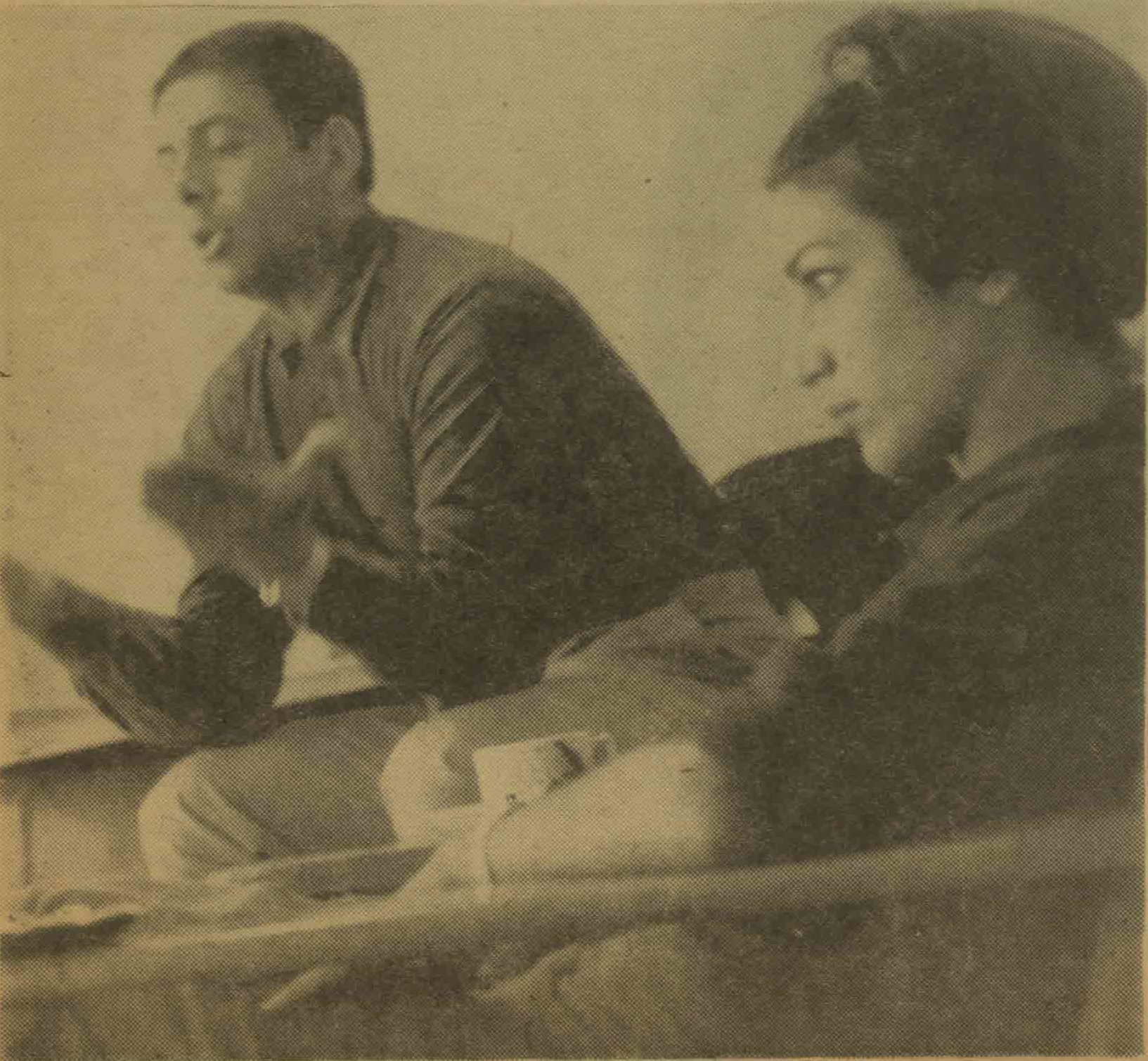
Golestan and Forugh Farrokhzad

After Forough Farrokhzad's death, Golestân was protective of her privacy and memory. For example, in response to the publication of a biographical/critical study by Michael Craig Hillmann called A Lonely Woman: Forugh Farrokhzad and Her Poetry (1987), he published a lengthy attack against Hillmann in a Tehran literary magazine, to which Hillmann responded at length in an article, part of which was also published in the same Tehran literary magazine. In 2005, Golestan's long conversation with Parviz Jahed was published in Iran under the title Writing with a Camera (Neveshtan ba Doorbin).

In February 2017, 50 years after Farrokhzad's death, the 94-year-old Golestan broke his silence about his relationship with Forough, speaking to Saeed Kamali Dehghan of The Guardian. Golestan said: "I rue all the years she isn't here, of course, that's obvious. We were very close, but I can't measure how much I had feelings for her. How can I? In kilos? In metres?".

Golestan participated in the 2022 documentary See You Friday, Robinson. Director Mitra Farahani initiated an email exchange between Golestan and French filmmaker Jean-Luc Godard, with emailed text letters from Golestan and "videos, images, and aphorism" responses from Godard.

Golestan turned 100 in October 2022, and died in Sussex on 22 August 2023.

== Works ==
Golestan started his film studio Golestan Films in 1957 and produced some documentaries for the National Iranian Oil Company. A Fire and Moj, Marjan and Khara are amongst these films. He also produced the Forough Farrokhzad film The House is Black.

== Books ==
=== Stories ===
- Âzar, mâh-e âkher-e pâ’iz (Azar, the last month of autumn), 1948
- Shekâr-e sâyeh (Shadow-hunting), 1955
- Juy-o divâr-o teshneh (The stream, the wall and the thirsty one), 1967
- Madd-o meh (Tide and mist), 1969
- Rooster, 1995
- Neveshtan Ba Dourbin, 2005
- Sprachman, Paul (1982). "Ebrahim Golestan's the Treasure: A Parable of Cliché and Consumption". Iranian Studies. 15 (1): 155–180. doi:10.1080/00210868208701598. JSTOR 4310386.

== Filmography ==
=== Documentaries ===
- Yek atash (A fire) (1961)
- Moj, marjan, khara (1962)
- The Hills of Marlik (1963)
- The crown jewels of Iran (1965)

=== Drama ===
- Brick and Mirror (1963)
- Asrar ganj-e dareh-ye jenni (1974, in English: Secrets of the Jinn Valley Treasure)
