= Pooran Farrokhzad =

Iranian writer (1933–2016)

- پوران فرخزاد
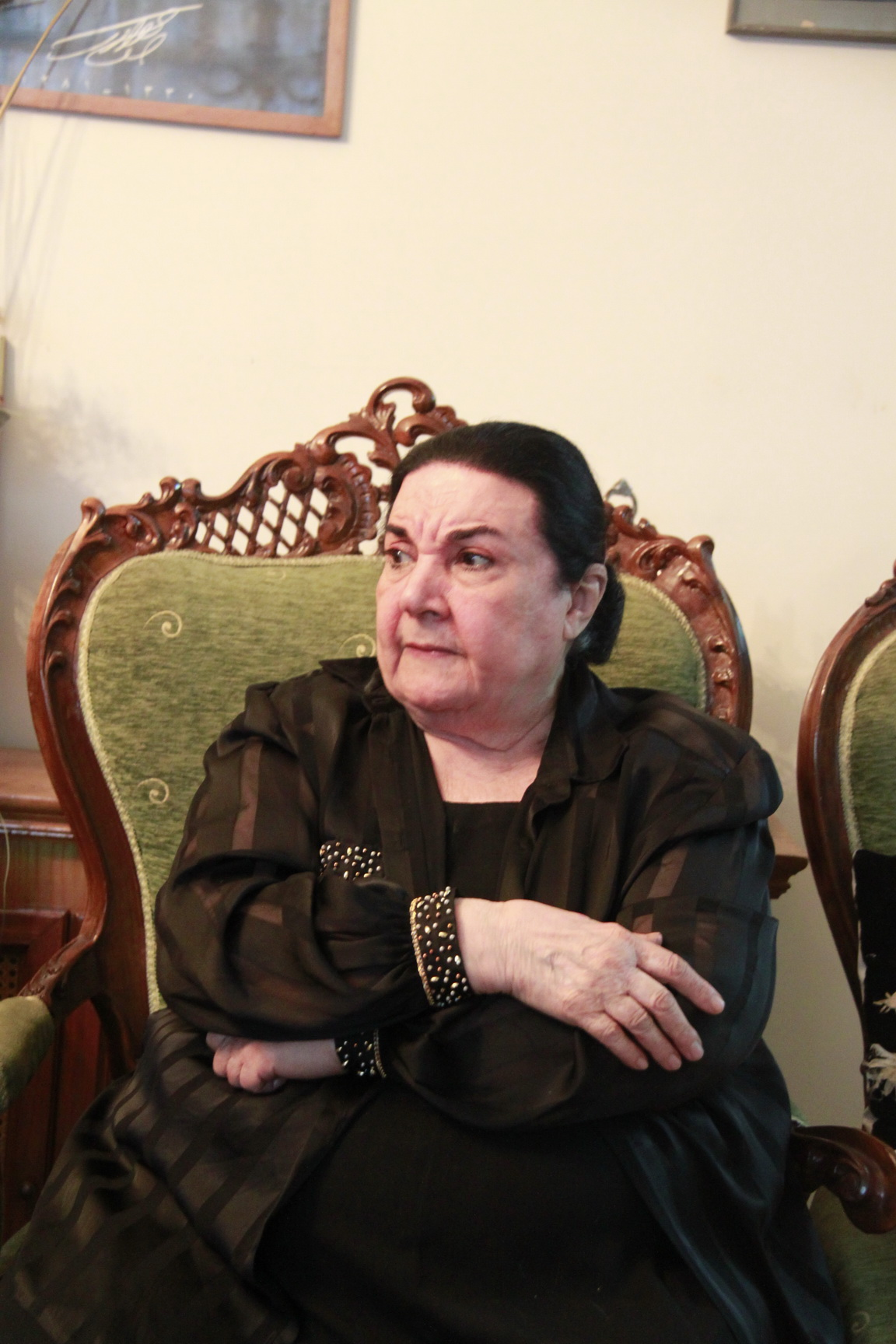
- Born: 4 February 1933; Tehran, Imperial State of Iran
- Died: 29 December 2016 (aged 83); Tehran, Iran
- Children: 2 daughters named Alaleh and Afsaneh
- Parent(s): Mohammad Farrokhzad (father); Turan Vaziri Tabar (mother)
- Relatives: Forugh Farrokhzad (sister); Fereydoun Farrokhzad (brother)

Pooran Farrokhzad (Persian: پوران فرخزاد; 4 February 1933 – 29 December 2016) was an Iranian writer, poet, playwright, and encyclopedist. She was author of the Encyclopedia of Women Culture Makers in Iran and in the World which was the first comprehensive women's encyclopedia in Iran.

She was the daughter of Turan Vaziri Tabar (born in Tehran and Kashitbar) and Colonel Mohammad Farrokhzad (who was an educated poet-loving lieutenant from the village of Bazargan Tafresh). Pooran Farrokhzad spent her childhood in Nowshahr and other cities and grew up in Tehran. She and her siblings learned to read before going to school and became accustomed to reading books. In 1931, her father moved from Nowshahr to Tehran, and Farrokhzad studied at Jaleh and Soroush Primary School, during which time her literary talent was revealed. She also learned English at home from the age of 9 with a teacher and continued at the Parvin Cultural Association and the Iran-US Association.

== Family ==
Farrokhzad's siblings were the poet Forugh Farrokhzad and entertainer Fereydoun Farrokhzad. She had two daughters: Alaleh and Afsaneh.
