= Cari-kalamator =

Cari-kalamator (Persian: کاریکلماتور) is the name of the Parviz Shapour's writings. The first time the term was used was in the Khoosheh Journal's editorial in 1968. in that Journal, Ahmad Shamlou said: this word is derived from "caricature" and "kalameh" (in Persian: کلمه; it means 'word'). Shapour's writings are cartoons that have been expressed through words.

== Examples from Parviz Shapoor's Cari-kalamators ==
- My heart is the most populated city in the world.
- Welcome to my eyes.
- Raindrop, is a small ocean.
