= Qaryat Imam ʽAskar =

Populated place in Diyala, Iraq

Qaryat Imam ʽAskar is a place with a very small population in the state/region of Diyala, Iraq.
