= Lili Golestan =

Iranian translator (b. 1944)

- لیلی گلستان
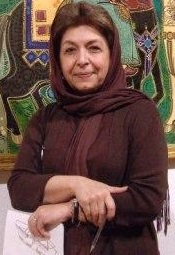
- Born: Lili Golestan Taghavi Shirazi; 14 July 1944; Tehran, Imperial State of Iran
- Occupations: Translator, Gallerist
- Title: Chevalier de l'Ordre des Palmes Académiques
- Spouse: Nemat Haghighi (1969–1974; div)
- Children: Mani Haghighi
- Parents: Ebrahim Golestan (father); Fakhri Golestan (mother)
- Relatives: Kaveh Golestan (brother)

Lili Golestan Taghavi Shirazi (Persian: لیلی گلستان تقوی شیرازی; born 14 July 1944 in Tehran) is an Iranian translator, and owner and artistic director of the Golestan Gallery in Tehran. She is the daughter of the filmmaker and writer Ebrahim Golestan and Fakhri Golestan, the sister of the late photojournalist Kaveh Golestan and the mother of filmmaker Mani Haghighi. She spent a number of her formative years in Abadan, where her father worked as a filmmaker.

== Translations ==
- How Babies are Made, Andrew Andry
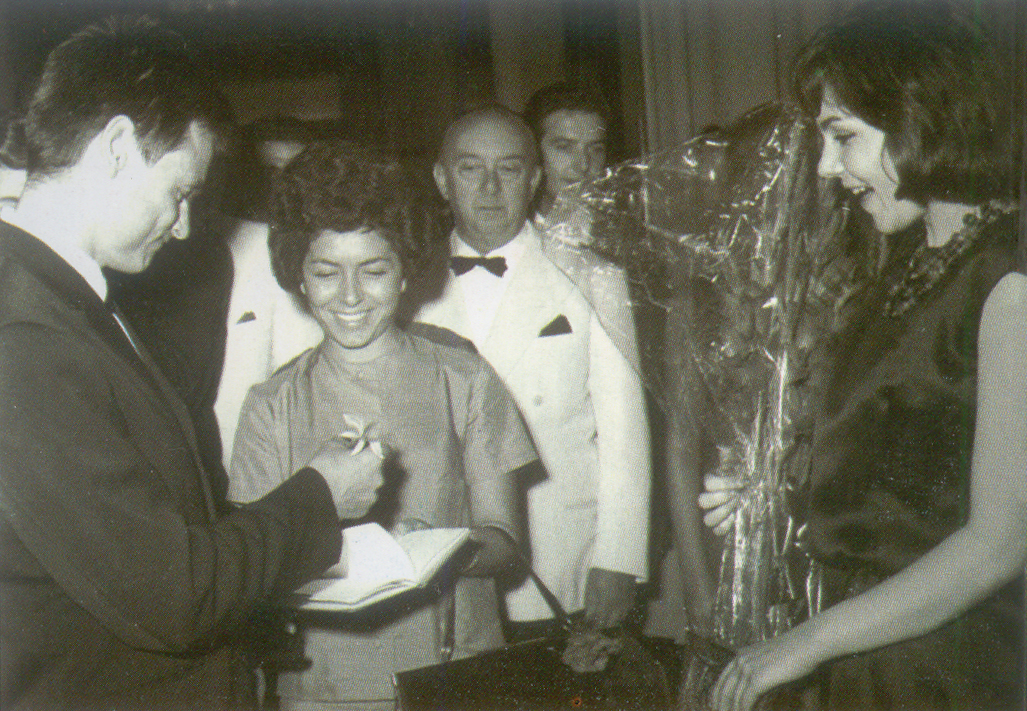
- Golestan and Andrei Tarkovsky in Venice Film Festival
  Life, War and Nothing Else, Oriana Fallaci
- The Strange Story of Spermato…
- Story Number 3, Eugène Ionesco
- Mira, Christopher Frank
- Tistou of the Green Thumbs, Maurice Druon
- Two Plays from Ancient China
- Chronicle of a Death Foretold, Gabriel Garcia Marquez
- The Man Who Had Everything, Everything, Everything, Miguel Angel Asturias
- The Fragrance of Guava, Gabriel Garcia Marquez
- Hellenism, Yiannis Ritsos
- Citizen Pigeon, Romain Gary
- Stories and Myths, Leonardo da Vinci
- Ondine, Jean Giraudoux
- If on a Winter's Night a Traveler, Italo Calvino
- The Story of My Condition Now, a long interview with Ahmad Mahmoud
- Six Memos for the Next Millennium, Italo Calvino
- A two volume book about Ali Hatami and his works
- Interview with Marcel Duchamp Pierre Cabanne
- About Colours, Wittgenstein
- Life with Picasso, Françoise Gilot
- Picasso, David Hockney
- Mark Rothko, Sean Scully
- Van Gogh, Gauguin
- Marcel Duchamp speaks about Readymades

== Author ==
- Majmooaye Honarhaye Tajasomi Moaser

== Titles ==
- Chevalier de l'Ordre des Palmes Académiques
