= Fakhri Golestan =

Iranian translator and ceramicist (1925-2012 )

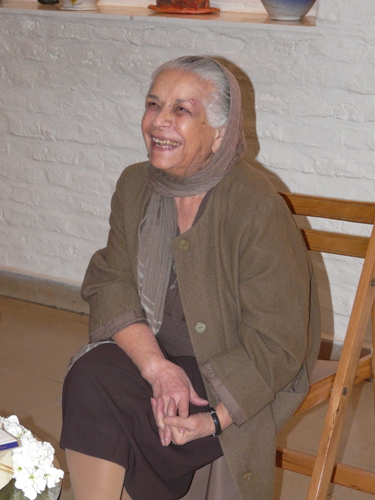
- Born: 20 September 1925; Shiraz, Iran
- Died: 6 July 2012 (aged 86); Tehran, Iran
- Occupations: Translator; Ceramic art
- Spouse: Ebrahim Golestan
- Children: Kaveh; Lili
- Relatives: Mohammad Hasan Vosogh (father)

Seyedah Maryam Fakhr Azam Taqvi Shirazi (Persian: فخری گلستان, 20 September 1925 – 6 July 2012) known as Fakhri Golestan, was an Iranian potter, translator and Children's rights activist.

== History ==
Seyedah Fakhri Golestan, the son of Mohammad Hassan (Watheq), was born in 1925. At the age of 17, she married her cousin Ebrahim Golestan, a famous Iranian writer and filmmaker. She is known as one of the first people who took measures to improve the situation of street children in Tehran. For many years, she was the director of an orphanage that raised the children of drug addicts. In the last years of her life, she practiced pottery and held several solo exhibitions of his works. She has also been honored by the Pottery Biennial. "Elephant" written by Polish author Slawimir Marzek and "No one knows me; Voices of America's Slum Children" translated by Fakhri Golestan was published. She was the mother of Kaveh Golestan, a photographer and documentary maker who was killed in Iraq. He lived apart from Ibrahim Golestan for many years until she died, on 6 July 2012, in Tehran.

== Death ==
Lili Golestan, the director of Golestan Gallery, in an interview said: After the revolution, her mother started making pottery at the age of 50 and exhibited her works several times. Lili Golestan attributed the old age and the shock of Kaveh's death as the cause of her mother's death. She did not have any special illness, but she was very sad about the death of her son Kaveh Golestan. Lily Golestan said that at the request of her mother, her funeral was held in a small family gathering.
