= El Mansouria, Iraq =

Al Mansouryah المنصورية
- Location within Iraq
- Coordinates: 34°04′36″N 44°57′17″E
- Country: Iraq
- Governorate: Diyala Governorate
- Districts of Iraq: Al-Khalis District

Al Mansouryah or Mansouryat Al-Jabel (Arabic: المنصورية) is a subdistrict of Al-Khalis District in the Diyala Governorate of Iraq, roughly 110 km north-east of Baghdad city, situated between the Diyala and Khalis rivers. Its capital is the town of Al Mansouryah.

== Demographics ==
The town and its surroundings are one a very few places in the Diyala Province where Sunnis form a vast majority—nearly the totality—of the population. The population is primarily composed of Sunni Arab (mostly of the Azza tribe) and minority Sunni Turkmen. Most inhabitants work in agricultural activities due to the area's fertile soil and plentiful water. Dates and citrus fruit are the area's primary crops.

== Security situation ==
During the June 2014 Islamic State offensive, Al Mansouryah fell to the Islamic State of Iraq and the Levant (IS). In January 2015 Iraqi army and security forces with popular mobilization forces liberated Al Mansouryah subdistrict after intensive clashes. The Diyala provincial council declared on 23 January 2015 that the battles resulted in the killing of dozens and fleeing of more dozens of IS militants.

== Al Mansouryah gas field ==
A gas field is located in the subdistrict. It was put up for bidding in third licensing round in 2010. The winning bidder was the consortium led by Turkish energy company TAPO who held 50% a stake, followed by Kuwait Energy with a 30% and Kogas with 20%. The consortium accepted $7 per barrel of oil equivalent as remuneration. According to the deal, the target production plateau is 320 million standard cubic feet.

== Al Mansouryah gas power plant ==
A gas power plant built by the French Astom company is located in the subdistrict (coordinates 34°08′50″N 44°56′06.6″E).

12 December 2011, Astom signed a contract worth $500 million with Iraqi ministry of Electricity to build the Al Mansouryah gas-fired power plant. The plant consist of four units based on Alstom’s GT13E2 gas turbine, using natural gas imported from Iran to generate 728 Mega Watt. The output of the Al Mansouryah power plant will be used to feed Diyala Governorate (which consume 500 MW), while the rest will use to feed Baghdad city.
