= Kaveh Golestan =

Iranian photojournalist (1950–2003)

- کاوه گلستان
- Born: 8 July 1950; Abadan, Iran
- Died: 2 April 2003 (aged 53); Kifri, Iraq
- Education: Millfield
- Occupation: Photographer
- Spouse: Hengameh Golestan
- Children: Mehrak Golestan
- Parent(s): Ebrahim Golestan; Fakhri Golestan
- Family: Lili Golestan (sister); Mani Haghighi (nephew)

Kāveh Golestān Taghavi Shirazi (Persian: کاوه گلستان; 8 July 1950 – 2 April 2003) was an Iranian photojournalist and artist. In 1988 he took the first pictures of the aftermath of the Halabja chemical attack during the Iran–Iraq War.

== Early life and education ==
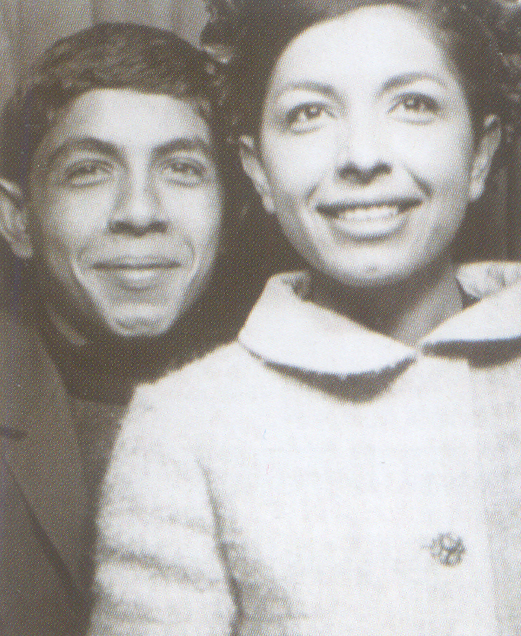
Golestān and his sister Lili

Golestan was the son of the Iranian filmmaker and writer Ebrahim Golestan and the brother of Lili Golestan, translator and the owner-artistic director of the Golestan Gallery in Tehran, Iran.

He was educated at Millfield School in Somerset, England.

== Life and work ==
In 1988, working as a freelance photographer, he took the first pictures of the aftermath of the Halabja chemical attack during the Iran–Iraq War. He was awarded the Robert Capa Gold Medal for his work covering the 1979 revolution for Time.

His picture was shown, among many other people, in the end credits of Roger Waters: The Wall.

Her students included Mehdi Vosoughnia, Hassan Sarbakhshian, Arash Yadollahi, and Hojjat Sepehvand, each of whom later pursued professional careers in the arts

== Death ==
On 2 April 2003 Golestān was killed, aged 53, as a result of stepping on a land mine while working for the BBC in Kifri, Iraq. He is buried in a cemetery in the east of Tehran.

== Personal life ==
Kaveh was married to Hengameh Golestan; they had a son, Mehrak, who is a musician.

== See also ==
- Iranian modern and contemporary art
