= Hengameh Golestan =

Iranian photographer (born 1952)

- هنگامه گلستان
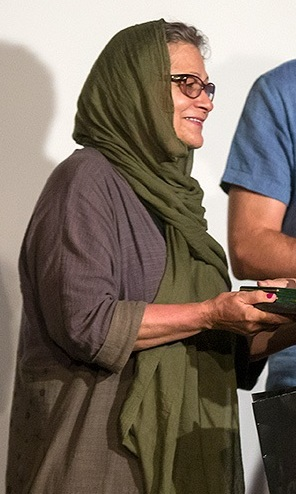
- Born: Hengameh Jalali; 1952 (age 73–74); Imperial State of Iran
- Known for: Photography
- Spouse: Kaveh Golestan
- Children: Mehrak

Hengameh Golestan (Persian: هنگامه گلستان; born Hengameh Jalali (هنگامه جلالی), 1952) is an Iranian photographer. She is considered a pioneer among Iranian women photographers.

In March 1979, when in the aftermath of the Iranian Revolution women in Iran began protesting the new government's rule ordering them to wear hijabs, she photographed the gatherings in the capital, in the process becoming one of few documentary photographers active in the country.

== Life and work ==
Golestan began working as a photographer at the age of 18; for a while she attended photography school in England, but otherwise she learned the craft from working as an assistant to her husband, photojournalist Kaveh Golestan; the couple had married in 1975, and later had a son, Mehrak.

She began her career in 1972, when there were only a handful of women photographers in the country. At the start of her career her preferred subject was everyday life in Tehran. However, in March 1979, when in the aftermath of the Iranian Revolution women in Iran began protesting the new government's rule ordering them to wear hijabs, she photographed the gatherings in the capital, in the process becoming one of few documentary photographers active in the country. These photographs became the basis for the "Witness 1979" series, the majority of which was not exhibited until 2015.

Later in her career, Golestan asked to travel to the front lines to photograph the Iran–Iraq War, a request which was denied due to her gender.

She moved to London with her husband and son in 1984.

Stylistically, Golestan has cited Mary Ellen Mark and Diane Arbus as influences on her work.

== Collections ==
Golestan's work is held in the following public collection:

- Arthur M. Sackler Gallery, Smithsonian Institution: seven photographs from the "Witness 1979" series
