= The Wind-Up Doll =

Poem by Forough Farrokhzad

"The Wind-Up Doll" is a poem by Forough Farrokhzad (1934 – 1967). It was translated into English in "A Rebirth: Poems" by David Martin, accompanied by a critical essay by Farzaneh Milani.

== Analysis ==
“The Wind-Up Doll,” conveys the psychological frustrations of women in a restrictive society. This is an ode to her frequent rebellion against patriarchal and religious expectations, to which she was opposed. Many of her poems feature a similar theme, depicting women as dolls to represent their objectification.

In this poem, Farrokhzad expresses feelings of absurdist emptiness through mentioning the roles of women. The narration of the poem is done in such a way that it could be addressing herself, women in general, or the reader. The tone of the poem is satirical and sarcastic, ending with the tragic lines:

'[one] can shout without reason, "Oh I am so happy!"'

== Author's legacy ==
Farrokhzad is one of the most influential Persian poets. Many of her poems focused on feminism and have therefore remained important and significant as the voice of women in Iran.

'The Wind-up Doll' is an example of Farrokhzad's poetic obsession with societal issues and critique of tradition. Due to this, Her work has made her a symbol of rebellion against existing social standards and roles for women. Her poetry has been banned since the Islamic Revolution in 1979, however it is still sold illegally. Farrokhzad remains beloved as one of the first female poets to critique inequality in her work.
