= Al Khalis District =

Al-Khalis District قضاء الخالص
- District
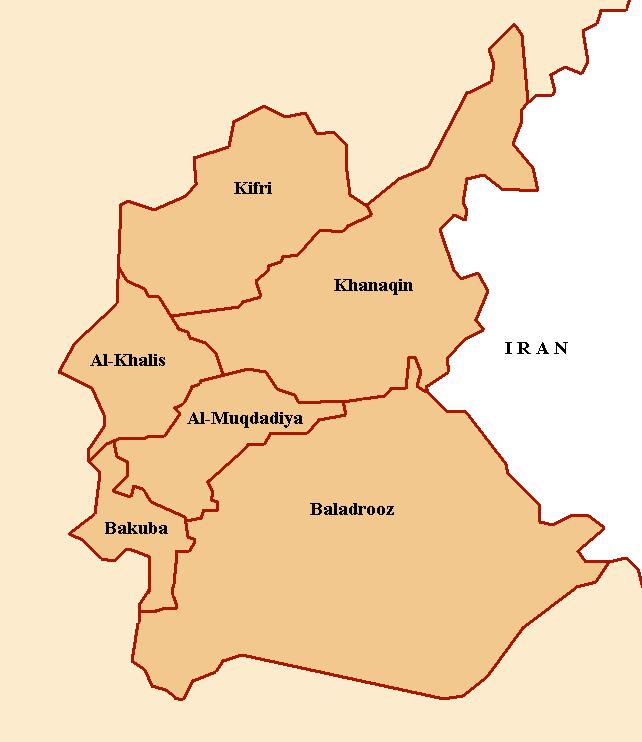
- Districts of Diyala Governorate

- Location within Iraq
- Country: Iraq
- Governorate: Diyala Governorate
- Time zone: UTC+3 (AST)

Al Khalis District, Khalis or Al Khales (Arabic: قضاء الخالص) is one of the six districts of Diyala Governorate in Iraq. Its main population center is the village of the same name. The village of Al Khalis is roughly 15 kilometers (9 mi) north of Baqubah.

The Khalis Arfan district previously housed the Mujahedin-e Khalq (PMOI, MEK, MKO) in Camp Ashraf. Ashraf residents are all considered as "protected persons," under the Fourth Geneva Convention.

== Towns and villages in the district ==
- Ashraf City
- Marfu Village
- Village of Nye
- Udame
- Al Khalis
- Al Mansouryah
