= Injanah Air Base =

U.S.-captured Iraqi Air Force base

Location
- Coordinates: 34°26′42″N 044°35′41″E

Location of Injanah Air Base, Iraq

Injanah Air Base is a former Iraqi Air Force base in the Diyala Governorate of Iraq. It was captured by U.S.-led Coalition forces during Operation Iraqi Freedom in 2003.

== History ==
In January 1991, Injanah Air Base was reported to be disused. The facility was an auxiliary airfield, consisting of a 10,000-foot runway and a small aircraft parking ramp.

The runway has been subjected to excavations by Coalition personnel and thus made unserviceable. The facility is now abandoned and being reclaimed by the desert.
