= Parviz Shapour =

Iranian artist (1924-1999)

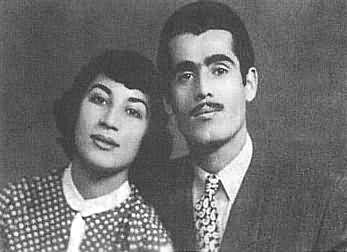
Forough Farrokhzad and Parviz Shapour

Parviz Shapour (Persian: پرویز شاپور; b. February 25, 1924 – d. August 6, 1999) was an Iranian artist and man of letters known for his witticisms and for his brief and troubled marriage to poet Forough Farrokhzad. He was a student of Nima Youshij and attended Sanati School. In 1952, at the age of 31, he began his career as V.P. of Finance in Iran's Finance Ministry and Ahvaz after earning a bachelor's degree in economics. By 1958 his stories were published once a week in Tofiegh magazine.

He married Forough Farrokhzad in 1950; they had a son, Kāmyār Shapour, before divorcing in 1955. Parviz then lived with his son and his brother, Khosro.

In 1968 Shapour collaborated with Ahmad Shamlou, editor of the art magazine Khoosheh (cluster) Journal, and one of Iran's most celebrated poets. Shamlou gave the name "Cari-kalamator", or word-caricature, to Shapour's writings. These short humorous sentences proved to be wildly popular with the Iranian public, and helped to make Shapour into one of Iran's cultural and literary leaders. Shapour's writings have been described as "cartoons expressed as words."

== Works and publications ==
Shapour's first book of writings and drawings was published in 1964, titled Cari-kalamator. His writings have been published in six volumes. His designs and drawings were showcased in exhibitions at the Art Gallery in Persepolis in 1968 and 1970.

Some samples from the first book of Cari-kalamatorShapour, Parviz (1964). Cariclamator, Book I: A Collection of Humorous Writings and Sketches. p. 90. are:

- The absent minded compass draws ellipses.
- The decline swims in the water fall.
- I have a lifetime to die.
- The sunflower feels indecisive in cloudy days.
- The guillotine believes that the human head is excessive.
- The cat climbs the first half of the tree because of the dog and the rest because of the bird.
- With the same speed that the cat climbs up the tree, the tree climbs down the cat.

His other works included:

- Shapour, Parviz (1975). Kariklamator, the second book: A short excursion with Parviz Shapour.
- Shapour, Parviz (1977). Kariklamator, Book IV: We all go to meet the mirror. p. 103.
- Shapour, Parviz (1975). Fancy lapel pin. p. 130.
