= Diyala Governorate =

Governorate of Iraq

Diyala Governorate محافظة ديالى
- Governorate
- Coordinates: 33°53′N 45°4′E
- Country: Iraq
- Capital: Baqubah
- Governor: Adnan al-Shimmari

Area
  - Total: 14,700 km^{2} (5,700 sq mi)

Population (2025)
  - Total: 1,934,504
  - Density: 132/km^{2} (341/sq mi)
- ISO 3166 code: IQ-DI
- HDI (2024): 0.719 high · 8th of 18
- Website: diyala.gov.iq

Diyala Governorate (Arabic: محافظة ديالى Muḥāfaẓat Diyālā) or Diyala Province is a governorate in northeastern Iraq.

== Provincial Government ==
- Governor: Adnan al-Shimmari
- Deputy Governor: Mustafa al-Luhaybi
- Provincial Council Chairman: Omar al-Kirwi

== Geography ==
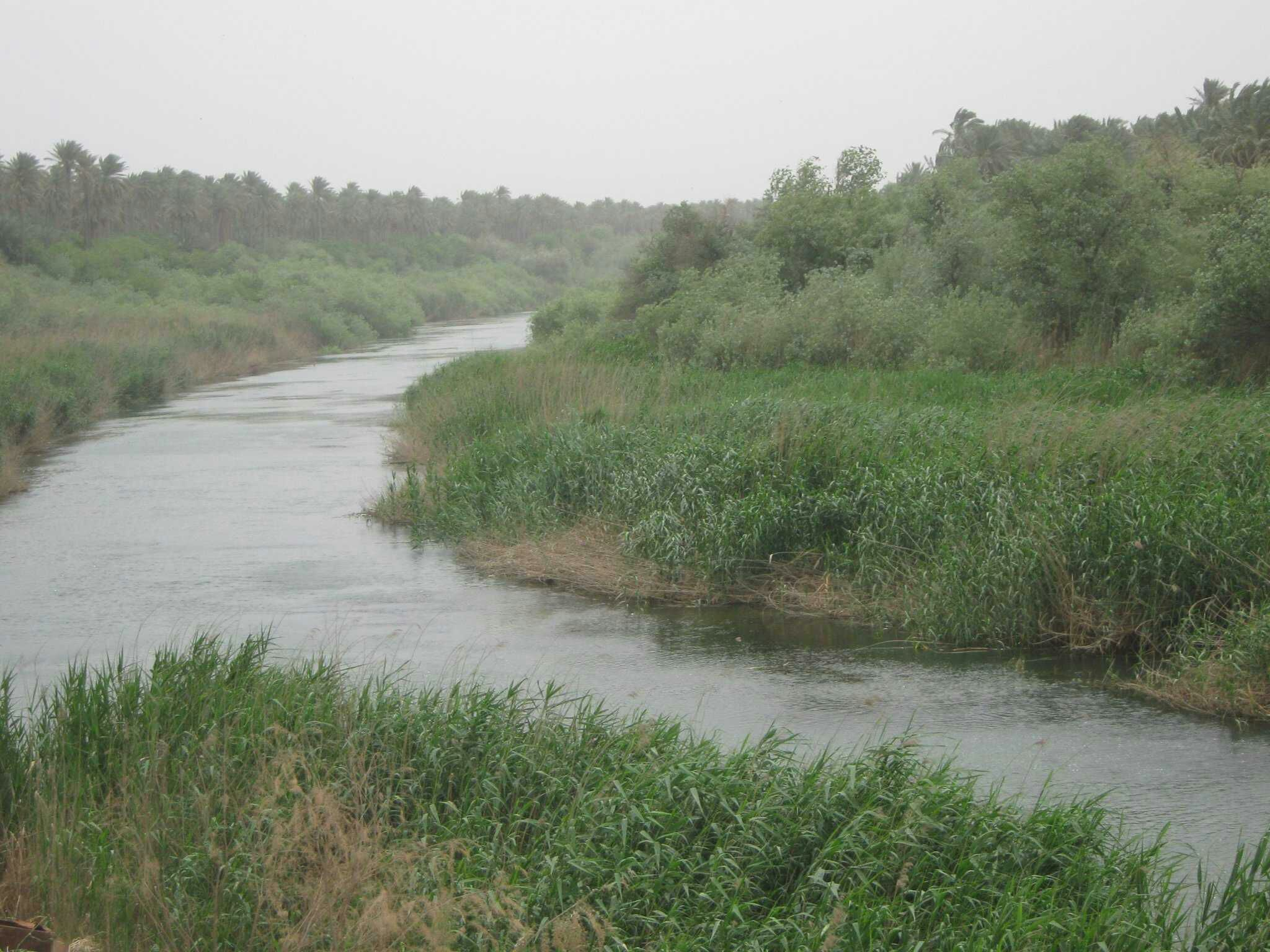
Diyala river

Diyala Governorate extends to the northeast of Baghdad as far as the Iranian border. Its capital is Baqubah. It covers an area of 17,685 square kilometres (6,828 sq mi).

A large portion of the province is drained by the Diyala River, a major tributary of the Tigris. Because of its proximity to two major sources of water, Diyala's main industry is agriculture, primarily dates grown in large groves. The province also contains one of the largest olive groves in the Middle East. It is also recognized as the orange capital of the Middle East. The Hamrin Mountains pass through the governorate.

== Population ==
The governorate is home to a diverse population of Arabs, Kurds and Turkmen, though the clear majority are Sunni Arabs, constituting around 60% of the provinces population. According to the latest statistics, the number of inhabitants is approximately 1.6 million.

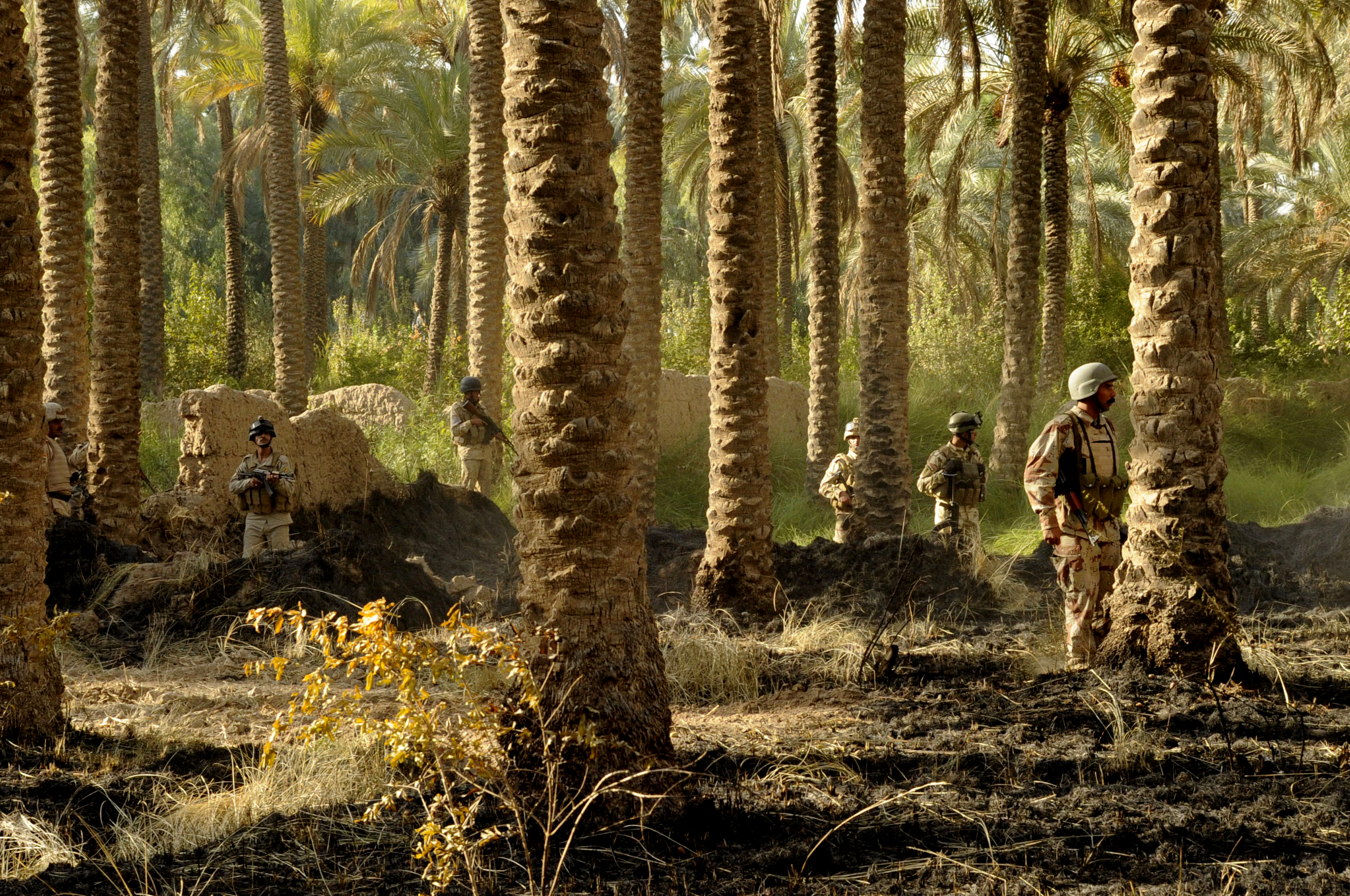
U.S. Army and Iraqi soldiers maneuver through palm groves in pursuit of insurgents in Diyala (2010)

== Culture ==
=== Sports ===
Diyala is home to Diyala SC that plays in Iraq Stars League, the highest division of the Iraqi football league system, following promotion from Iraqi Premier Division League in 2024. The club is based in Baqubah and Ba'quba Stadium is its home stadium.

== Administrative districts ==
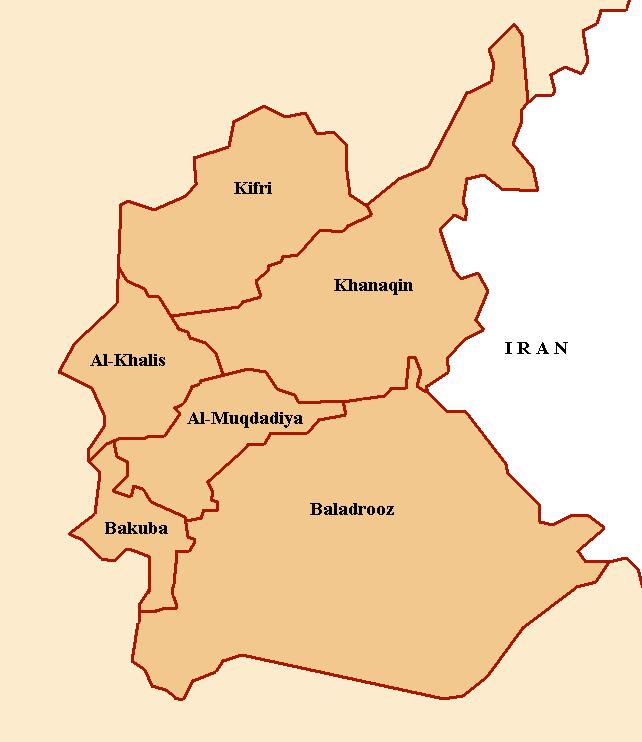
Districts of the Diyala Governorate

Diyala Governorate comprises seven districts, listed below with their areas and populations as estimated in 2018:

District	Name in Arabic	Area in sq. km	Population in 2018
Ba'quba	بعقوبة	1,943	600,780
Al-Khalis	الخالص	2,910	349,940
Al-Muqdadiya	المقدادية	1,015	254,526
Balad Ruz	بلد روز	5,982	148,177
Khanaqin	خانقين	1,861	138,539
Jalwala	جلولاء	453	93,685
Kifri	كفري	1,523	51,579
Total		14,700	1,637,226

== Cities, towns, and villages ==
- Baqubah (provincial capital)
- Nahrawan
- Miqdadiyah
- Hibhib
- Khanaqin
- Balad Ruz
- Al Khalis
- Bani Sa'ad
- Jalawla (or Jalula)
- Al-Sadiyah
- Mansouryat al-Jabel
- Camp Ashraf
- Dwelah
- Kingirban
- Naft Khana
- Al-Ghalibiyah
- Abd Allah Bayk
- Safra'
- Marfu Village
- Village of Nye
- Udame
- Kan’aan
- Al Wajihiya
- Al Muntheriya
- Abu Saydah
- Buhriz
- Mandali
- Qaryat Imam ʽAskar
- Kifri
- Qara Tapa

== Infrastructure ==
The Diyala Province boasts the Diyala Media Center which has one of the Middle East's tallest radio and television antennas at 349 metres (1,047 ft). The Diyala Media Center was built under contract by a Japanese architectural firm in 1989. It is one of Iraq's few independent radio and television stations that offer local television and radio news coverage as well as rebroadcasting state-run television.

== Civil unrest/Iraq War ==
There is evidence that Al-Qaeda in Iraq moved its base of operations from Anbar province to Diyala in 2006 and during late 2006, Baqubah and majority of the Diyala province were reported to have come under Sunni insurgent control. This insurgent control is reported to have continued through 2007 and into early 2008.

On May 11, 2007, Army Maj. Gen. Benjamin Mixon, commander of the Multi-National Division North said he needed more troops in order to contain the current level of violence in the Diyala province, this coming in the recent wake of a troop "surge", involuntary recalls by the U.S. military, and the public debate about the level of commitment from the U.S. government. By mid-2007 the Islamic State of Iraq, already holding Baqubah and most of the province under its control, declared its capital to be Baqubah. The Sunni insurgent group Jamaat Ansar al-Sunna was also active in the region around this time.

In June 2007, US forces launched Operation Arrowhead Ripper with night air assaults in Baqubah. By August 19, Baqubah was largely secured, although some insurgent presence remained in the city and surrounding areas. Fighting continued in the Diyala River valley but by the beginning of October, US and Iraqi forces held most of the province while the insurgents were in retreat to the north and west. On October 27 the Islamic State of Iraq attacked a police base in Baqubah, killing 28 Iraqi policemen and police recruits, showing that insurgent cells still remain in the province.

In January 2008 Operation Phantom Phoenix was launched in an attempt to eradicate the remaining insurgents following the Diyala campaign between 2006 and 2007.

Mid-2008 saw many changes in Diyala province with an increased effort by U.S. Forces and a substantial Iraqi Army presence, and in the Baqubah region, Islamic State of Iraq's activity was dramatically hampered, and the Sons of Iraq program served only to further weaken Islamic State in Iraq.

=== Declaration of autonomy ===
In December 2011, the governing council in Diyala province declared itself a semi-autonomous region within Iraq. This comes two months after Saladin Governorate made a similar declaration. The council in Diyala, using Article 119 of the Iraqi Constitution as justification, made the declaration because of suspicion of the Shi'a-dominated government of Prime Minister Nouri al-Maliki. Unlike Salah ad Din province however, Diyala province is more ethnically and religiously mixed, and such an announcement led to the outbreak of protests in the province.

== See also ==
- Hisham al-Hayali, former governor
- Battle of Baqubah
- Injanah Air Base
- 15 July 2008 Baquba bombings
- 15 September 2008 Balad Ruz bombing
- 23 April 2009 Iraqi suicide attacks
- 3 March 2010 Baqubah bombings
- 2014 Musab bin Omair mosque massacre
