= Ghassan Hamdan =

Iraqi scholar, poet and translator

Ghassan Hamdan (also spelled Gassan Hamdan) is an Iraqi scholar, poet and translator.

He is noted for having translated poems of legendary Persian poets such as Rumi, Forough Farrokhzad, Sohrab Sepehri and Ahmad Shamlou into the Arabic language.

== Early life and career ==
Hamdan was born in Baghdad in 1973, and finished his studies in Baghdad and Tehran. He studied sociology at University of Tehran. Then he Worked as a teacher, writer, translator, journalist and a researcher in Iranian affairs. He also worked as an editor for several TV channels, editing cultural and political programs, and as a translator. Including: (Al-An, Al-Alam, National Geographic, Iranian state TV, Beladi, Rega, etc).

== Publications ==
Authored a novel, “Remora”, published in 2015. Published a small poems collection, “It was an eastern morning”, in 2021.

Translated many Persian books into Arabic, including:

- ‘Only the sound remains’, Forough Farrokhzad. Almada, 2003.
- ‘The traveler’, SohrabSepehri. Syrian ministry of culture, 2007.
- ‘Khomeini’s poems’. Kewan and Tanweer. 2007
- ‘Still thinking of that crow’, Ahmad Shamlou. Syrian ministry of culture, 2009.
- ‘American spouse’, Jalal Al-e-Ahmad. Syrian ministry of culture, 2010.
- ‘Her eyes’, Bozorg Alavi. Syrian minis of culture. 2010
- ‘Tehran … the dark light’, Amir Hassan Cheheltan. Al-Rabee’aAl-Arabi, Egypt, 2014.
- ‘Islamic expedition to Francia and the myth of creation’, Sadegh Hedayat. Al-Jamal, Lebanon, 2014.
- ‘The swamp’, Ja'far Modarres-Sadegh. Al-Jamal, Lebanon, 2017.
- ‘The face of God’, Mostafa Mastoor. Al-Tanweer, Egypt, 2014.
- ‘The nocturnal harmony’, Reza Ghassemi. Al-Rabee’aAl-Arabi, Egypt, 2015.
- Omar Khayyam’s poems. Al-Jamal, Lebanon, 2017.
- Full collection of Sadegh Hedayat. Al-Jamal, Lebanon, 2017.
- ‘The pig’s bone’, Mostafa Mastoor. Al-Tanweer, Egypt, 2017.
- ‘Blue’, ‘Gray’, ‘Black’, Hamid Mosadegh. Al-Darawesh, Bulgaria, 2018.
- Full collection of poem, SohrabSepehri. Al-Rafidain, Lebanon, 2018.
- ‘What a disappointment, Mulla Omer’, Asef Soltanzadeh. Al-Rafidain, Lebanon, 2018.
- ‘World’s last remaining pomegranate’, Bachtyar Ali. Al-Khan, Kuwait, 2019.
- ‘A woman in Istanbul’, Ali AsgharHaqdar. Athar, Saudi Arabia, 2019
- ‘In the same time’, Mohammed QassemZadeh. Al-Khan, Kuwait, 2019.
- ‘Iranian myths and stories’, Mohammed QassemZadeh. Al-Khan, Kuwait, 2019.
- ‘Dreams seller’, Mohammed QassemZadeh. Al-Khan, Kuwait, 2020.
- ‘Tuesday’s shirt: chosen Iranian novels’, Tarjman, Kuwait, 2020.
- ‘Dr. N loves his wife more than Mossadegh’, ShahramRahimian. Sual, Lebanon, 2020.
- ‘Nun wa'l qalam’, Jalal Al-e Ahmad. Al-Tanweer, Egypt, 2020.
- Philosophy letters of Mulla Sadra. Al-Jamal, Lebanon, 2020
- ‘Qabsat’, Mir Damad. Al-Jamal, Lebanon, 2020
- ‘The Afghan’, Arif Farman. Khotot, Jordan, 2020.
- ‘The wind will carry us’, Abbas Kiarostami. Al-Jamal, Lebanon, 2020.
- ‘The story of honeycombs’, Jalal Al-e Ahmad. Al-Jamal, Lebanon, 2020.
- ‘Maw’oda’, Mohammad Hussain Mohamadi. Al-Jamal, Lebanon, 2020.
- ‘The castle and my father’s dogs’, Shirzad Ahmad. (Pending publication).
- ‘This dog wants to eat Roxana’, QassimKashkoli. (Pending publication).

Translated several Arabic novels into Persian:

- ‘Bab Al-Abd’, AdhamAl-Aboudi. Ejaz, Tehran.
- ‘Baghdad mortuary’, BurhanShawi. Butimar, Tehran.
- ‘Khan Al-Shabender’, Mohammad Hayawi. Mahri, London.
- ‘Ejam’, Sinan Antoon.
- ‘Family’s winter’, Ali Bader.
- ‘Baghdad’s infidel’, JaaferRajab.
- ‘Statue’s head’, Hassan Al-Fartoosi.
- ‘Samahain’, Abdelaziz Baraka Sakin
- ‘Hamlet waking up late’, MamdouhAdwan.
- Selected poems of Muhammad al-Maghut, Marwarid Publishing, Tehran.
- Ghassan Kanafani’s letters to Ghada al-Samman. Sada Publishing, Tehran.
