= Jamal Hamdan (actor) =

Lebanese actor and voice actor (born 1958)

- جمال حمدان
- Born: February 20, 1958 (age 68); Haret Hreik, Baabda District, Mount Lebanon Governorate, Lebanon
- Occupations: Actor, voice actor

Jamal Hamdan (Arabic: جمال حمدان, born 20 February 1958) is a Lebanese actor and voice actor.

== Filmography ==
=== Film ===
- Warshots. 1996

=== Television ===
- Bab Almorad - Ali ibn Ja'far al-Sadiq. 2014
- Qiyamat Al Banadiq. 2013
- Al Ghaliboun. 2011
- Ajyal. 2010
- Im Visier der Zielfahnder - Araber #2. 2002

=== Plays ===
Year	Title	Role	Source
2013	Waelon Le Omma	Dr. Salah	

=== Dubbing roles ===
- 1001 Inventions and the Library of Secrets - Al-Jazari / Librarian
- Atlantis: The Lost Empire - Fenton Q. Harcourt (Classical Arabic version)
- Atlantis: Milo's Return - Erik Hellstrom (Classical Arabic version)
- Doctor Who
- The Men of Angelos
- Mokhtarnameh - Umar ibn Sa'ad
- The Mysterious Cities of Gold
- Robin Hood - Prince John (Classical Arabic version)
- The Wild Soccer Bunch
