= Kurdistan Democratic Independence Party (PASOK) =

Kurdish Nationalist Political Party

Kurdistan Independence Democratic Party Partî Serbexoyî Dîmokratî Kurdistan
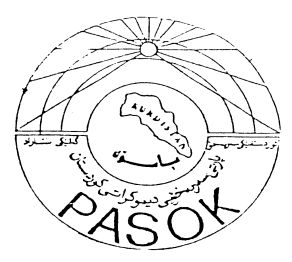
- Leader: Azad Mustafa
- Founder: Azad Mustafa, Farhad Abdulqadir, Mamosta Sherzad
- Ideology: Pan-Kurdism; Kurdish nationalism Socialism

Website
- http://www.pasok.eu/

The Kurdistan Independence Democratic Party (Kurdish: Partî Serbexoyî Dîmokratî Kurdistan), also known as PASOK, founded in Kirkuk in 1975 by Kurdish intellectuals Farhad Abdulqadir, Mamosta Sherzad and Azad Mustafa, was a Kurdish nationalist political party that fought for the ideal of a Greater Kurdistan.

After its first congress it assembled a force of its own Peshmerga, and undertook armed operations in Sulaymaniyah and Erbil against the Iraqi Army. recruitments were done mostly in universities. It joined the National democratic front in 1982 and The Kurdistan Front which superseded it in May 1988. After its 1991 congress, it changed its name to PDSK, joining the KSP and KPDP.

== Name ==
At the beginning, the name of the party was PANSOK (National Socialist Party Of Kurdistan) but it was later changed to PASOK in fear of getting associated with Nazism.
