= Kifri =

Kifri کفری Kifrî
- Town
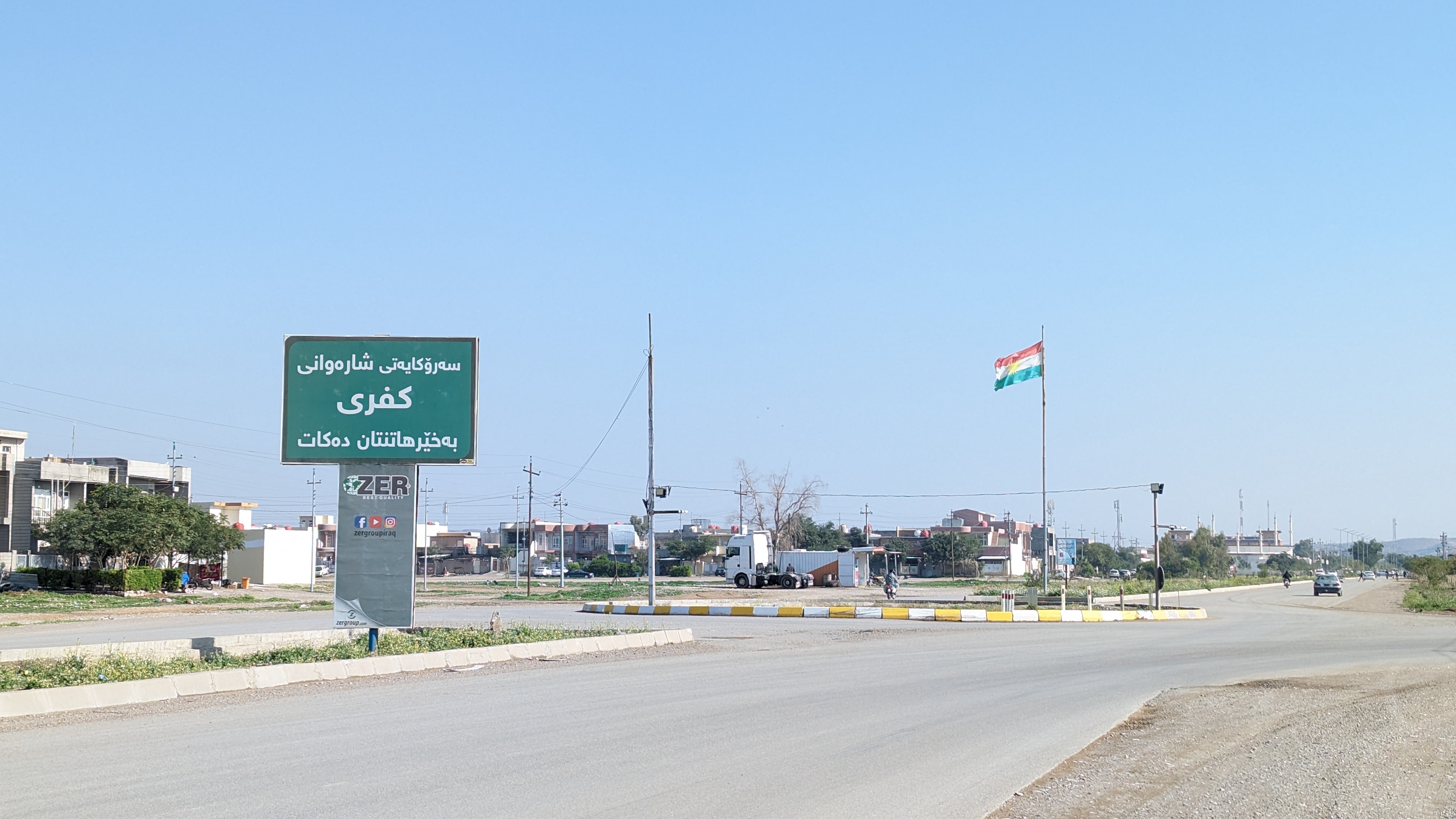
- View over Kifri

- Location in Iraqi Kurdistan Kifri (Iraq)
- Coordinates: 34°41′0″N 44°58′0″E
- Country: Iraq
- Federal Region: Kurdistan Region
- Governorate: Sulaymaniyah
- Elevation: 282 m (925 ft)

Population (2014)
  - Total: 32,870
- Time zone: UTC+3

Kifri (Arabic: کفري; Kurdish: کفری, romanized: Kifrî; Turkish: Kifri) is the central town of Kifri District in Diyala Governorate, Kurdistan Region, Iraq. It has a mixed population of Arabs, Kurds and Turkmen.

== History ==
Kifri was known to have oil as early as the 1820s. James Buckingham visited Kifri in the 1820s. He described the town as clean and moderately large, estimating its population at 3,000. Buckingham also described the town as having furnished bazaars with excellent fruit, especially melons and grapes. Kifri had a cookshop selling kebabs, roast meat and sausages, and one coffee-house.

Kifri, which was also known as Salahiye during the Ottoman era, was part of the Ottoman Empire until the United Kingdom captured the town in April 1918 during the Mesopotamian campaign. During the capture, 565 Ottoman prisoners and one mountain gun were captured. The local Kurds were supportive of the British and were described as very hostile to the Ottomans. Britain briefly lost control over the town for two days during the revolt of 1920 to the local tribes. Captain G. H. Salmon was killed during the tribal takeover.

The locals of Kifri did not support the Mahmud Barzanji revolts causing Mahmud Barzanji not to push for the inclusion of the town into his jurisdiction. In 1921, the town was included in the plans of Winston Churchill in creating an independent Kurdistan which would work as a bulwark against Turkey.

Under the British Mandate of Iraq, the Turkoman language was an official language in Kifri under Article 5 of the Language Act of 1930, due to the town's significant Turkmen population.

British data stated that Kurds constituted 67% and 60% of the population in the town in 1924 and 1931, respectively, while the remaining population was Arab and Turkmen. However, the town was not included in the 1931 British-Iraqi 'Local Languages Law' initiative which would have made Kurdish an official language in the town for arbitrary reasons. 70% of the population was Kurdish in the Iraqi census of 1947.

Iraq's first two Turkmen schools were opened on November 17, 1993, one in Erbil and the other in Kifri.

=== Iraqi-Kurdish conflict ===
While it was previously part of Kirkuk Governorate, it was attached to Diyala Governorate in 1976 as part of the Arabization efforts by Iraq.

The town was quickly captured by Kurdish rebels (Peshmerga) in March 1991 during an uprising that began that month. In October 1991, heavy fighting took place between Iraqi forces and Peshmerga after the former had started shelling the town indiscriminately, prompting about 1,000 Kurds to flee toward Sulaymaniyah. Iraqi forces would ultimately fail at recapturing the town and Kifri would be included in the autonomous Kurdistan Region when established in May 1992, despite being part of Diyala Governorate.

The town experienced deadly clashes between the Patriotic Union of Kurdistan and the Kurdistan Islamic Movement in December 1993 which quickly spread to other towns in the region. 18 KIM members were killed on 28 December only.

Despite being the southernmost point of the autonomous region, the town remained calm for over a decade until April 2003 when the US military shelled the outskirts of the town during the US-led invasion of Iraq, forcing the Iraqi Army to retreat southward. In April 2005, a mass grave from the Anfal genocide was discovered in the town. In September 2005, residents of Kifri demanded to be reincorporated into Kirkuk Governorate to reverse the Arabization policy of 1976.

In July 2020, Iraqi and Kurdish forces agreed to jointly run the area south of the town despite recurring tensions.

== Jewish community ==
A Jewish community existed in Kifri for decades until the exodus to Israel in the 1950s. While the Jewish population in Kifri was only six in 1826, it grew to 15 households in 1845 with one synagogue located in the town. The number of Jews was 30 households in 1859 and 50 people in 1884. The population grew steadily by the turn of the century to 300 people in 1906, 540 in 1924 and 722 in 1931.

== Eski Kifri ==
Eski Kifri (lit. ‘Old Kifri’ in Turkish) is a large and extensive site situated some eight kilometers south-west of Kifri. In the 19th century, Claudius Rich found artefacts at the site dating to the Sasanian and Middle Assyrian periods, including a fortified complex, jar and vessel.

== See also ==
- Garmekan
- Garmian Region
- Beth Garmai
- Kaveh Golestan
- Latif Halmat
