= Kifri District (Diyala) =

Kifri District قضاء كفري (Arabic)
- District
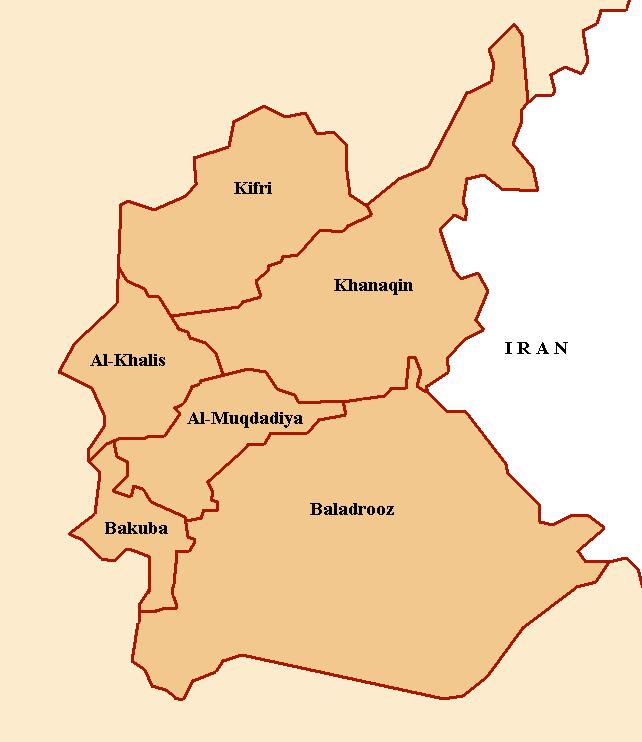
- Districts of Diyala Governorate
- Country: Iraq
- Governorate: Diyala Governorate
- Seat: Kifri

Population (2003)
  - Total: 42,010

Kifri District (Arabic: قضاء كفري) is one of the six districts of Diyala Governorate in Iraq. Its main town is Kifri. The population was estimated at 42,010 in 2003.
