= Khurshid Davron =

Uzbek poet, historical fiction writer, and literary translator

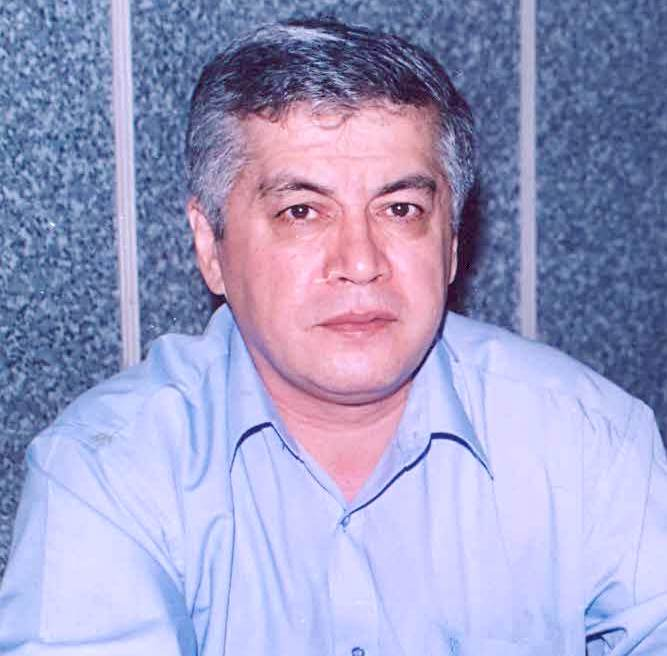
- Khurshid Davron
- Born: January 20, 1952 (age 74); Samarkand, Uzbekistan
- Occupations: Poet, historical fiction writer, literary translator
- Writing career
- Genres: Poetry, Prose, historical fiction
- Website: kh-davron.uz

Khurshid Davron (Uzbek: Xurshid Davron, Хуршид Даврон) (born January 20, 1952) is an Uzbek poet, historical fiction writer, and literary translator. His work often presents Uzbekistan and nearby Central Asia historical and cultural perspectives. and Central Asia in the whole.

== Early life and education ==
Davron was born in Samarkand, Uzbekistan. He studied journalism at the Tashkent State University in Uzbekistan (1977).

== Career ==
Davron joined the Union of Writers of Uzbekistan in 1979. He participated in various international conferences in Poland, Bulgaria, Russia, Turkey, Georgia, Greece, Azerbaijan, Kazakhstan, Tajikistan, Turkmenistan, Ukraine, Canada, South Korea and United States. Winner of many international literary awards.

Davron is an author of a "Temurnoma" television series. As a script-writer he took part in anniversary celebrations of Tamerlane (600th anniversary), Ulugh Beg (660th anniversary), and city of Bukhara (2500th anniversary). He's an author of the "Silk Route" musical (Director: Bakhodir Yuldoshev), which was put on stage of the French theatre “Odeon” ["Odéon-Théâtre de l'Europe"] (Paris). He also wrote a script for an opening musical ceremony of the "Sharq taronalari" (Melodies of the Orient) International Music Festival, which was held in Samarkand (1997, 1999, 2001, 2003 years).

In 1999 Khurshid Davron was awarded with the title of People's Poet of the Republic of Uzbekistan. He was elected as a deputy of the Uzbek Parliament (2000–2004).

Khurshid Davron's official website received a number of awards at UZ national domain Internet Festival (2012–2013).

He published more than 20 poetry and historical fiction books. His poetry has been read on Yoshlar television programs.

== Literary works ==
The following is a list of Khurshid Davron's books of poetry (original works and translations included): (English titles in parentheses)

- "Qadrdon quyosh" (Dear Sun) (1979)
- "Shahardagi olma daraxti" (Apple tree in the city) (1979)
- "Tungi bog'lar" (Gardens of the Night) (1981)
- "Uchib boraman qushlar bilan" (I'm flying with the birds) (1983)
- "To'marisning ko'zlari" (Eyes of Tomiris) (1984)
- "Bolalikning ovozi" (Voice of the childhood) (1986)
- "Qaqnus" (Phoenix) (1987)
- "Dengiz yaproqlari" (Leaves of the sea) (1988)
- "Qirq oshiq daftari" (Lovers' diaries) (1989)
- "Bahordan bir kun oldin" (A day before the spring) (1997)

The following is a list of Davron's historical fiction books: (English titles in parentheses)

- "Samarqand xayoli" (Dreams of Samarkand) (1991)
- "Sohibqiron nabirasi" (Tamerlane's grandson) (1995)
- "Shahidlar shohi" (King of martyrs) (1998/ republished in 2008)
- "Bibixonim qissasi" (A story about Bibi-Khanym) (2006)
