= Davilat =

Davilat دويلات
- Village
- Location within Iran
- Coordinates: 36°12′00″N 51°51′57″E
- Country: Iran
- Province: Mazandaran
- County: Nur
- Bakhsh: Baladeh
- Rural District: Sheykh Fazlolah-e Nuri

Population (2006)
  - Total: 53
- Time zone: UTC+3:30 (IRST)
  - Summer (DST): UTC+4:30 (IRDT)

Davilat (Persian: دويلات, also Romanized as Davīlāt and Dovīlāt) is a village in Sheykh Fazlolah-e Nuri Rural District, Baladeh District, Nur County, Mazandaran Province, Iran. At the 2006 census, its population was 53, in 17 families.
