= Sarasb =

Sarasb سراسب
- Village
- Location within Iran
- Coordinates: 36°08′33″N 51°47′42″E
- Country: Iran
- Province: Mazandaran
- County: Nur
- Bakhsh: Baladeh
- Rural District: Sheykh Fazlolah-e Nuri

Population (2006)
  - Total: 73
- Time zone: UTC+3:30 (IRST)
  - Summer (DST): UTC+4:30 (IRDT)

Sarasb (Persian: سراسب, also Romanized as Sarāsb) is a village in Sheykh Fazlolah-e Nuri Rural District, Baladeh District, Nur County, Mazandaran Province, Iran. At the 2006 census, its population was 73, in 21 families.
