= Dunay, Iran =

Dunay (Persian: دوناي) in Iran may refer to:

- Dunay-e Olya
- Dunay-e Sofla
