= Yasel =

Yasel ياسل
- Village
- Location within Iran
- Coordinates: 36°10′38″N 51°44′27″E
- Country: Iran
- Province: Mazandaran
- County: Nur
- Bakhsh: Baladeh
- Rural District: Sheykh Fazlolah-e Nuri

Population (2006)
  - Total: 16
- Time zone: UTC+3:30 (IRST)
  - Summer (DST): UTC+4:30 (IRDT)

Yasel (Persian: ياسل, also Romanized as Yāsel) is a village in Sheykh Fazlolah-e Nuri Rural District, Baladeh District, Nur County, Mazandaran Province, Iran. At the 2006 census, its population was 16, in 6 families.
