= Khojir Kola =

Khojir Kola خجيركلا
- Village
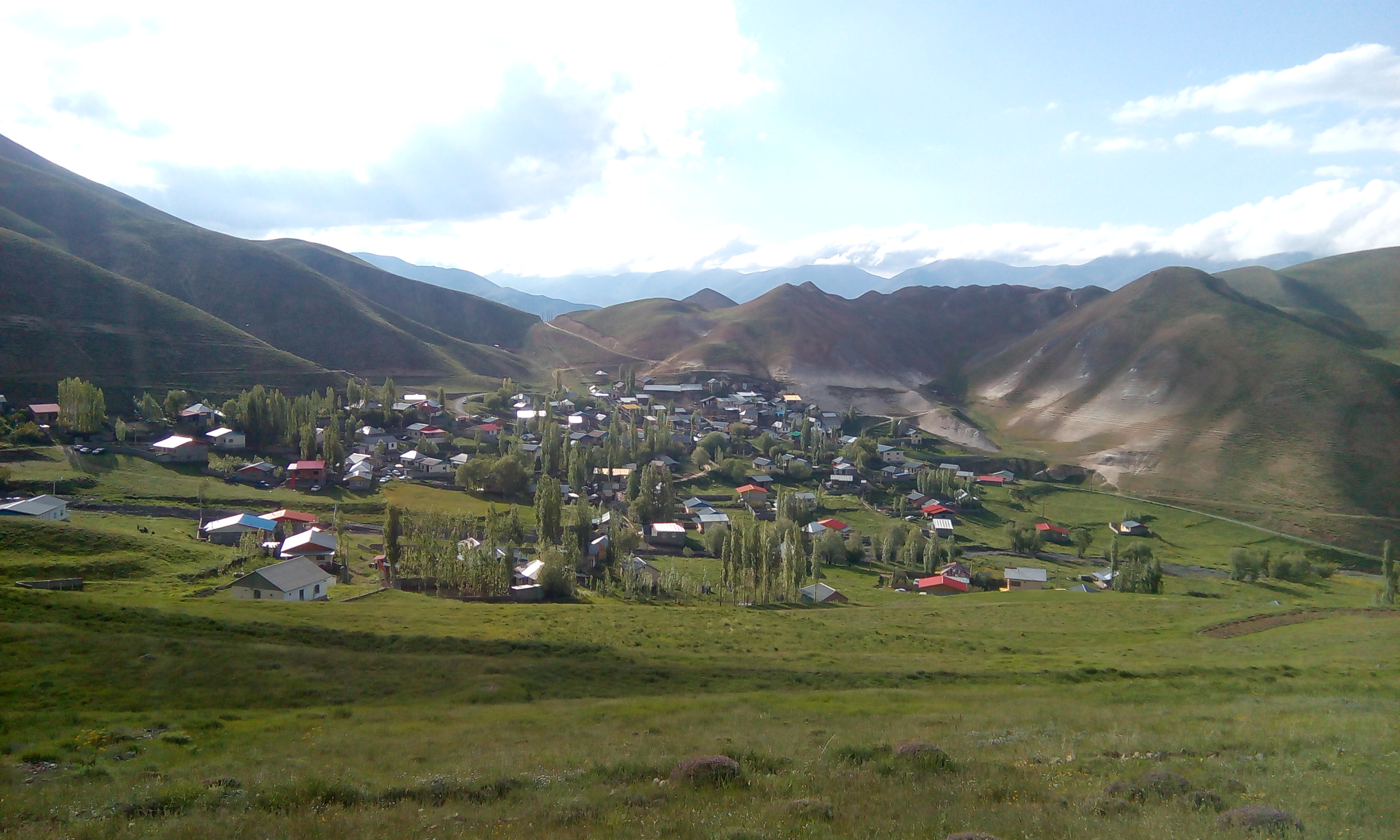

- Location within Iran
- Coordinates: 36°09′18″N 51°40′59″E
- Country: Iran
- Province: Mazandaran
- County: Nur
- Bakhsh: Baladeh
- Rural District: Sheykh Fazlolah-e Nuri

Population (2016)
  - Total: 126
- Time zone: UTC+3:30 (IRST)

Khojir Kola (Persian: خجيركلا, also Romanized as Khojīr Kolā; also known as Khūjīr Kolā) is a village in Sheykh Fazlolah-e Nuri Rural District, Baladeh District, Nur County, Mazandaran Province, Iran. At the 2016 census, its population was 126 in 51 households. Large increase from 31 people in 2006.
