= Kelak-e Sofla =

Kelak-e Sofla کلاک سفلی
- Village
- Location within Iran
- Coordinates: 36°12′24″N 51°33′58″E
- Country: Iran
- Province: Mazandaran
- County: Nur
- Bakhsh: Baladeh
- Rural District: Owzrud

Population (2016)
  - Total: 104
- Time zone: UTC+3:30 (IRST)

Kelak-e Sofla (Persian: کلاک سفلی, also Romanized as Kelāk-e Soflá; also known as Kelāk-e Pā’īn) is a village in Owzrud Rural District, Baladeh District, Nur County, Mazandaran Province, Iran, north of Kelak-e Olya village. At the 2016 census, its population was 104, in 45 families. Up from 67 people in 2006.
