= Nahiyeh, Mazandaran =

Nahiyeh ناحيه
- Village
- Location within Iran
- Coordinates: 36°09′07″N 51°36′40″E
- Country: Iran
- Province: Mazandaran
- County: Nur
- Bakhsh: Baladeh
- Rural District: Owzrud

Population (2016)
  - Total: 138
- Time zone: UTC+3:30 (IRST)

Nahiyeh (Persian: ناحيه, also Romanized as Nāḩīyeh) is a village in Owzrud Rural District, Baladeh District, Nur County, Mazandaran Province, Iran. At the 2016 census, its population was 138, in 53 families. Up from 125 in 2006.
