= Owz, Mazandaran =

Village in Mazandaran province, Iran

Owz Persian: اوز
- Village
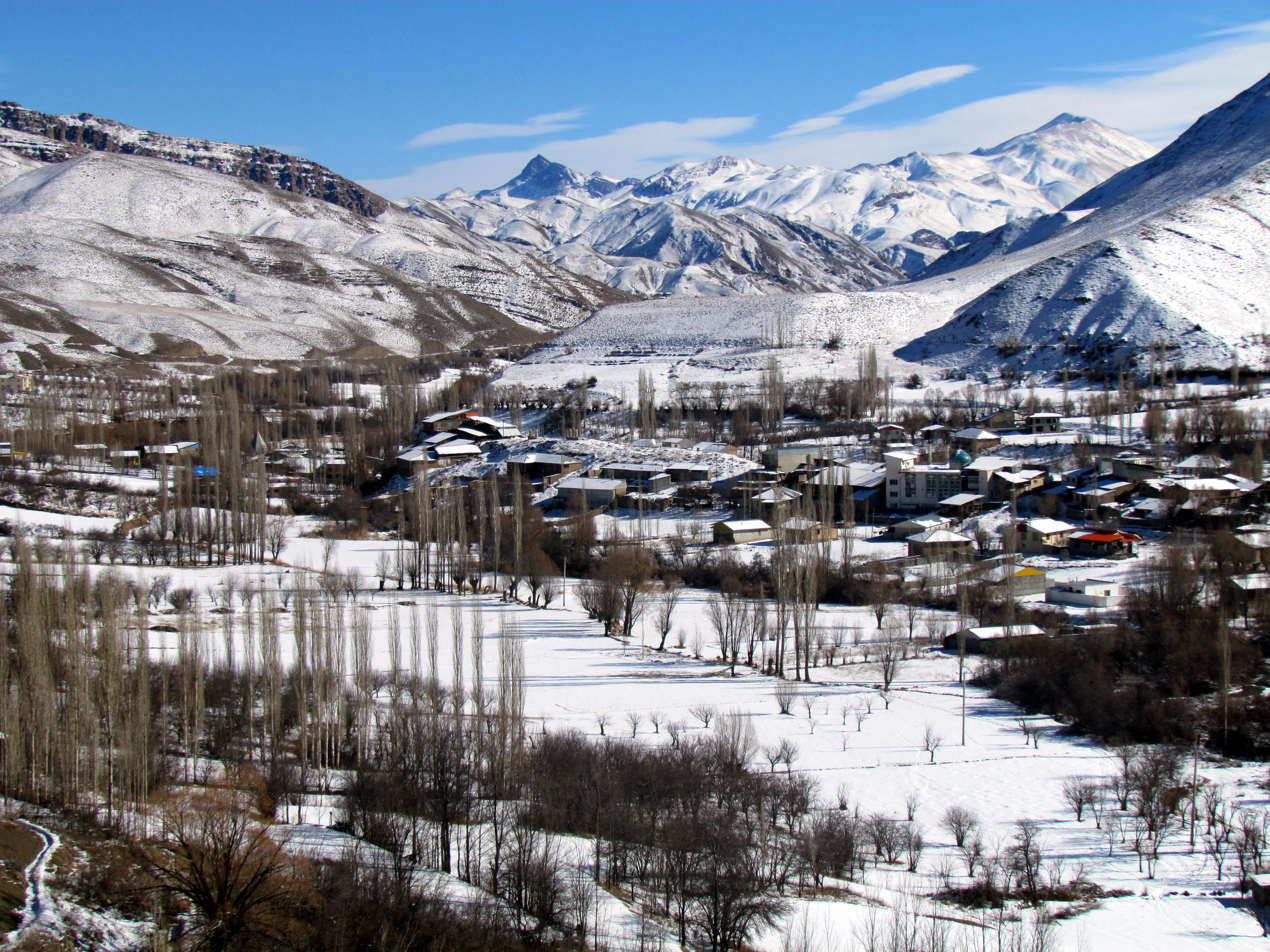
- Winter landscape in the village of Owz

- Location within Iran
- Coordinates: 36°11′47″N 51°40′00″E
- Country: Iran
- Province: Mazandaran
- County: Nur
- District: Baladeh
- Rural District: Owzrud

Population (2016)
  - Total: 185
- Time zone: UTC+3:30 (IRST)

Owz (Persian: اوز) (Note: Also romanized as Ūz) is a village in Owzrud Rural District of Baladeh District in Nur County, Mazandaran province, Iran.

== Demographics ==
=== Population ===
At the time of the 2006 National Census, the village's population was 149 in 59 households. The following census in 2011 counted 88 people in 39 households. The 2016 census measured the population of the village as 185 people in 70 households.
