= Kalavangah =

Village in Mazandaran province, Iran

Kalavangah Persian: كلاونگا
- Village
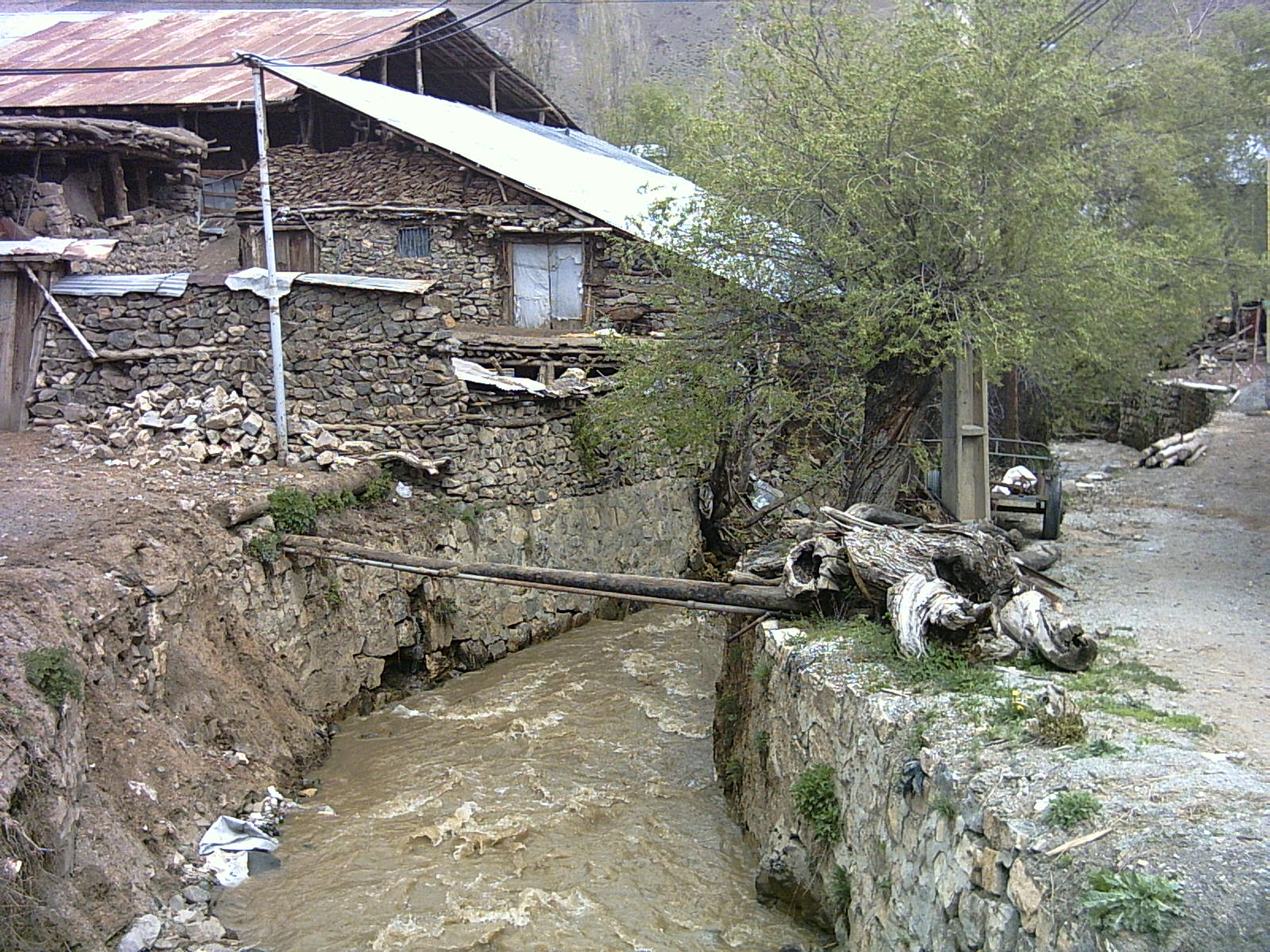
- The village of Kalavangah

- Location within Iran
- Coordinates: 36°11′24″N 51°26′21″E
- Country: Iran
- Province: Mazandaran
- County: Nur
- District: Baladeh
- Rural District: Owzrud

Population (2016)
  - Total: 153
- Time zone: UTC+3:30 (IRST)

Kalavangah (Persian: كلاونگاه) (Note: Also romanized as Kalāvangāh and Kalāvengāh; also known as Kalāvanga and Kalāvengā) is a village in Owzrud Rural District of Baladeh District in Nur County, Mazandaran province, Iran.

== Demographics ==
=== Population ===
At the time of the 2006 National Census, the village's population was 39 in 13 households. The following census in 2011 counted 30 people in 13 households. The 2016 census measured the population of the village as 153 people in 55 households.
