= Chel =

Chel may refer to:

- NHL (video game series), often colloquially known as Chel
- Chel, a village in the municipality of Chajul, Guatemala
- Chel, Iran, a village in Nur County, Mazandaran province
- A character from The Road to El Dorado
