= Noj =

Village in Mazandaran province, Iran

Noj Persian: نج
- Village
- Location within Iran
- Coordinates: 36°10′22″N 52°00′12″E
- Country: Iran
- Province: Mazandaran
- County: Nur
- District: Baladeh
- Rural District: Tatarestaq

Population (2016)
  - Total: 114
- Time zone: UTC+3:30 (IRST)

Noj (Persian: نج) (Note: Also known as Noch) is a village in Tatarestaq Rural District of Baladeh District in Nur County, Mazandaran province, Iran.

== Demographics ==
=== Population ===
At the time of the 2006 National Census, the village's population was 311 in 111 households. The following census in 2011 counted 146 people in 63 households. The 2016 census measured the population of the village as 114 people in 73 households.
