= Angerud =

Village in Mazandaran province, Iran

Angerud Persian: انگرود
- Village
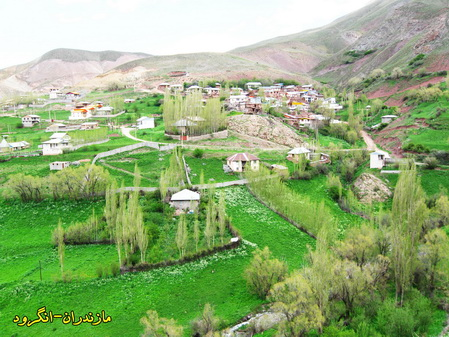
- The village of Angerud

- Location within Iran
- Coordinates: 36°09′02″N 51°39′31″E
- Country: Iran
- Province: Mazandaran
- County: Nur
- District: Baladeh
- Rural District: Owzrud

Population (2016)
  - Total: 199
- Time zone: UTC+3:30 (IRST)
- Website: www.angehrud.ir

Angerud (Persian: انگرود) (Note: Also romanized as Āngerūd; also known as Angeh Rūd and Angehrud (انگه رود)) is a village in Owzrud Rural District of Baladeh District in Nur County, Mazandaran province, Iran.

== Demographics ==
=== Population ===
At the time of the 2006 National Census, the village's population was 80 in 25 households. The following census in 2011 counted 51 people in 18 households. The 2016 census measured the population of the village as 199 people in 69 households.
