= Kamarbon, Nur =

Village in Mazandaran province, Iran

Kamarbon Persian: كمربن
- Village
- Location within Iran
- Coordinates: 36°13′42″N 51°23′53″E
- Country: Iran
- Province: Mazandaran
- County: Nur
- District: Baladeh
- Rural District: Owzrud

Population (2016)
  - Total: 253
- Time zone: UTC+3:30 (IRST)

Kamarbon (Persian: كمربن) is a village in Owzrud Rural District of Baladeh District in Nur County, Mazandaran province, Iran.

== Demographics ==
=== Population ===
At the time of the 2006 National Census, the village's population was 89 in 29 households. The following census in 2011 counted 72 people in 33 households. The 2016 census measured the population of the village as 253 people in 87 households.
