= Takar =

Village in Mazandaran province, Iran

Takar Persian: تاکر
- Village
- Location within Iran
- Coordinates: 36°12′05″N 52°00′35″E
- Country: Iran
- Province: Mazandaran
- County: Nur
- District: Baladeh
- Rural District: Tatarestaq

Population (2016)
  - Total: 108
- Time zone: UTC+3:30 (IRST)

Takar (Persian: تاکر) (Note: Also romanized as Tākar and Tākor) is a village in, and the capital of, Tatarestaq Rural District in Baladeh District of Nur County, Mazandaran province, Iran.

== Demographics ==
=== Population ===
At the time of the 2006 National Census, the village's population was 150 in 49 households. The following census in 2011 counted 148 people in 60 households. The 2016 census measured the population of the village as 108 people in 62 households.
