= Razan, Nur =

Village in Mazandaran province, Iran

Razan Persian: رزن
- Village
- Location within Iran
- Coordinates: 36°12′07″N 52°10′57″E
- Country: Iran
- Province: Mazandaran
- County: Nur
- District: Baladeh
- Rural District: Tatarestaq

Population (2016)
  - Total: 162
- Time zone: UTC+3:30 (IRST)

Razan (Persian: رزن) is a village in Tatarestaq Rural District of Baladeh District in Nur County, Mazandaran province, Iran.

== Demographics ==
=== Population ===
At the time of the 2006 National Census, the village's population was 213 in 73 households. The following census in 2011 counted 167 people in 62 households. The 2016 census measured the population of the village as 162 people in 65 households.
