= Alika =

Alika may refer to:

== Geography ==
- Alika, Nur (Persian: اليكا)

== People ==
- Alika (Estonian singer) Alika Milova (2002), known mononymously as Alika, Estonian singer
- Alika (Uruguayan–Argentine singer) (1977)
- Alika Smekhova (1968) Russian actress
- Murder of Alika Ogorchukwu, Nigerian street vendor in Italy
- Alika Lindbergh (1929), commonly known by her former name Monique Watteau, Belgian fantasy fiction writer and artist
- Alika Kinan (1976) Argentinian feminist and anti-human trafficking activist
- Alika Keene (1994) Jamaican woman footballer
- Alika Williams (1999) male American professional baseball shortstop in the Tampa Bay Rays organization

== Other ==
- Alika (moth)
