= Tabarsi =

Tabarsi may refer to:

- Shaykh Tabarsi, a 12th-century Shia scholar
- Husain Noori Tabarsi, a 19th-century Shia scholar
- Battle of Fort Tabarsi, a 19th-century battle between Babis and the government forces
