= Il, Iran =

Village in Mazandaran province, Iran

Il Persian: ايل
- Village
- Location within Iran
- Coordinates: 36°09′51″N 51°55′23″E
- Country: Iran
- Province: Mazandaran
- County: Nur
- District: Baladeh
- Rural District: Tatarestaq

Population (2016)
  - Total: 107
- Time zone: UTC+3:30 (IRST)

Il (Persian: ايل) (Note: Also romanized as Īl) is a village in Tatarestaq Rural District of Baladeh District in Nur County, Mazandaran province, Iran.

== Demographics ==
=== Population ===
At the time of the 2006 National Census, the village's population was 185 in 71 households. The following census in 2011 counted 80 people in 46 households. The 2016 census measured the population of the village as 107 people in 53 households.
