= Hatar =

Hatar may refer to:

- Hatar, Iran
- Hatar, Pakistan
- Határ, Romania
