= Yal Rud =

Village in Mazandaran province, Iran

Yal Rud Persian: يالرود
- Village
- Location within Iran
- Coordinates: 36°08′23″N 51°50′39″E
- Country: Iran
- Province: Mazandaran
- County: Nur
- District: Baladeh
- Rural District: Sheykh Fazlolah-e Nuri

Population (2016)
  - Total: 171
- Time zone: UTC+3:30 (IRST)

Yal Rud (Persian: يالرود) (Note: Also romanized as Yāl Rūd, also known as Yālu) is a village in Sheykh Fazlolah-e Nuri Rural District of Baladeh District in Nur County, Mazandaran province, Iran.

== Demographics ==
=== Population ===
At the time of the 2006 National Census, the village's population was 153 in 47 households. The following census in 2011 counted 89 people in 40 households. The 2016 census measured the population of the village as 171 people in 72 households.
