= Pichdeh, Nur =

Pichdeh پيچده
- village
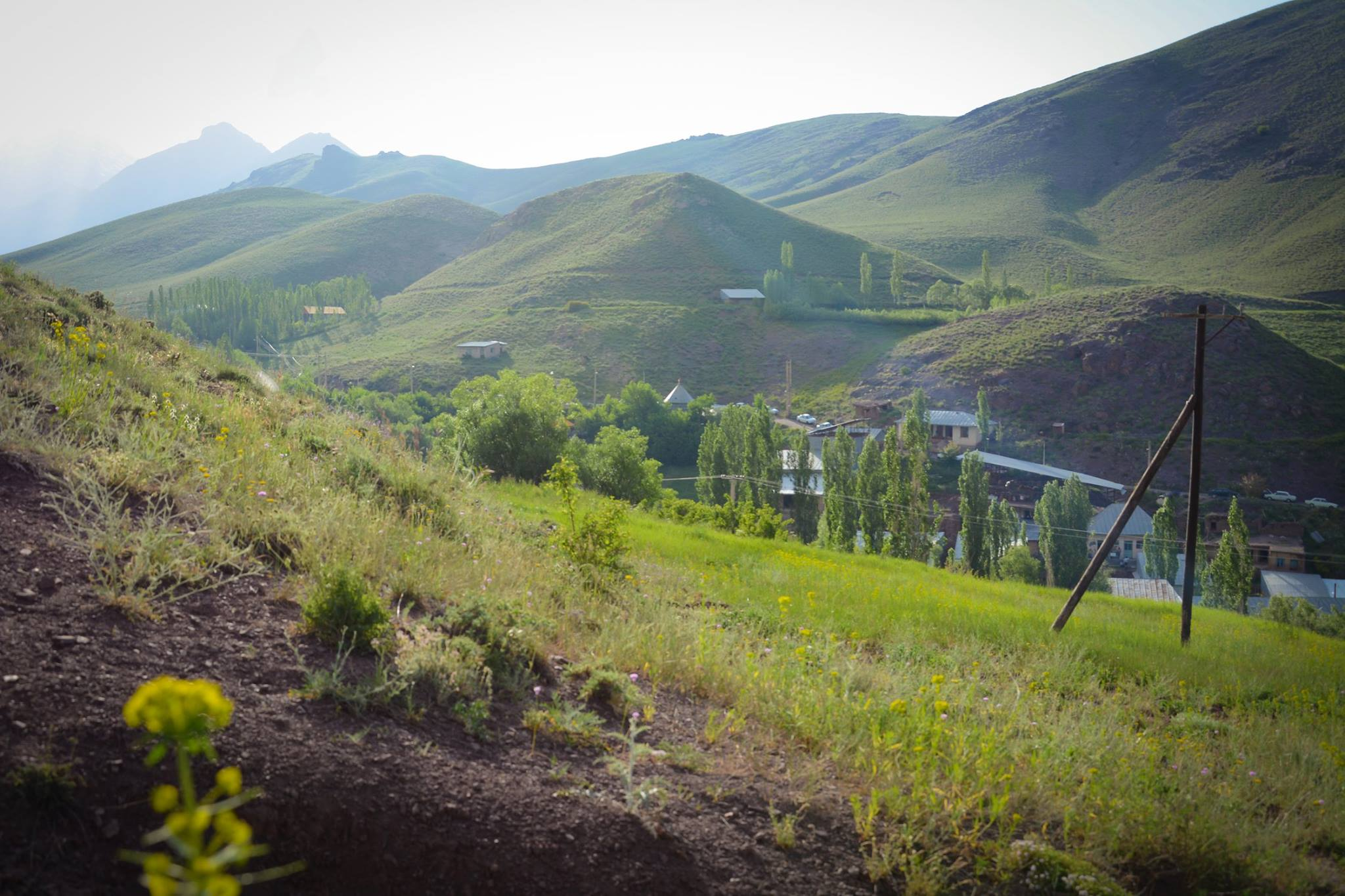
- Pichdeh Nur

- Location within Iran
- Coordinates: 36°09′11″N 51°38′08″E
- Country: Iran
- Province: Mazandaran
- County: Nur
- Bakhsh: Baladeh
- Rural District: Owzrud

Population (2016)
  - Total: 52
- Time zone: UTC+3:30 (IRST)

Pichdeh (Persian: پيچده, also Romanized as Pīchdeh) is a village in Owzrud Rural District, Baladeh District, Nur County, Mazandaran Province, Iran. At the 2006 census, its population was 52, in 23 families. Increased from 16 in 2006.

It is the birthplace of Mirza Husain Noori Tabarsi (Persian: میرزا حسین نوری طبرسی, Arabic: الميرزا حسين النوري الطبرسي) (1838 - 1902) popularly known as Muhaddis Noori who was a top Shi'a Islamic cleric and father of Islamic Shi'a Renaissance.
