= Bordun =

Village in Mazandaran province, Iran

Bordun Persian: بردون
- Village
- Location within Iran
- Coordinates: 36°08′30″N 51°46′05″E
- Country: Iran
- Province: Mazandaran
- County: Nur
- District: Baladeh
- Rural District: Sheykh Fazlolah-e Nuri

Population (2016)
  - Total: 207
- Time zone: UTC+3:30 (IRST)

Bordun (Persian: بردون) (Note: Also romanized as Bordūn) is a village in Sheykh Fazlolah-e Nuri Rural District of Baladeh District in Nur County, Mazandaran province, Iran.

== Demographics ==
=== Population ===
At the time of the 2006 National Census, the village's population was 82 in 31 households. The following census in 2011 counted 142 people in 53 households. The 2016 census measured the population of the village as 207 people in 73 households.
