= Pil, Iran =

Village in Mazandaran province, Iran

Pil Persian: پيل
- Village
- Location within Iran
- Coordinates: 36°13′46″N 51°34′01″E
- Country: Iran
- Province: Mazandaran
- County: Nur
- District: Baladeh
- Rural District: Owzrud

Population (2016)
  - Total: 122
- Time zone: UTC+3:30 (IRST)

Pil (Persian: پيل) (Note: Also romanized as Pīl; also known as Pel) is a village in, and the capital of, Owzrud Rural District in Baladeh District of Nur County, Mazandaran province, Iran.

== Demographics ==
=== Population ===
At the time of the 2006 National Census, the village's population was 53 in 23 households. The following census in 2011 counted 27 people in 17 households. The 2016 census measured the population of the village as 122 people in 54 households.
