= Niknam Deh =

Niknam Deh (Persian: نيكنام ده) may refer to:

- Niknam Deh, Mazandaran
- Niknam Deh, Tehran
