= Korsi, Iran =

Village in Mazandaran province, Iran

Korsi Persian: كرسي
- Village
- Location within Iran
- Coordinates: 36°12′52″N 52°10′02″E
- Country: Iran
- Province: Mazandaran
- County: Nur
- District: Baladeh
- Rural District: Tatarestaq

Population (2016)
  - Total: 186
- Time zone: UTC+3:30 (IRST)

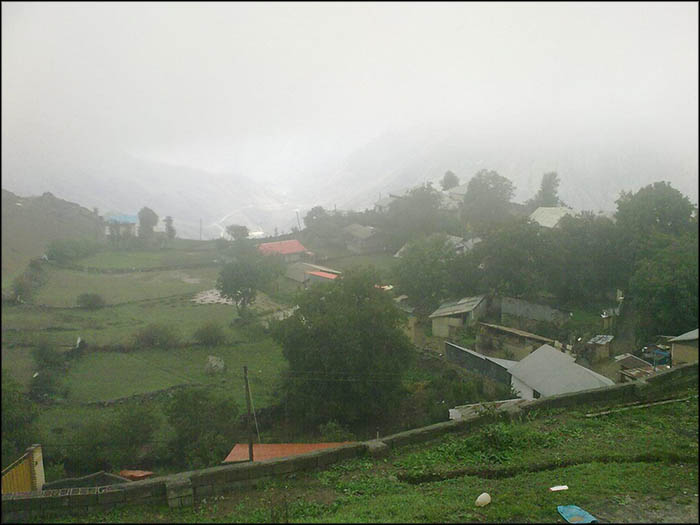
Korsi

Korsi (Persian: كرسي) (Note: Also romanized as Korsī) is a village in Tatarestaq Rural District of Baladeh District in Nur County, Mazandaran province, Iran.

== Demographics ==
=== Population ===
At the time of the 2006 National Census, the village's population was 180 in 59 households. The following census in 2011 counted 108 people in 53 households. The 2016 census measured the population of the village as 186 people in 80 households, the most populous in its rural district.
