= Mazid =

Village in Mazandaran province, Iran

Mazid Persian: مزيد
- Village
- Location within Iran
- Coordinates: 36°11′58″N 51°54′02″E
- Country: Iran
- Province: Mazandaran
- County: Nur
- District: Baladeh
- Rural District: Sheykh Fazlolah-e Nuri

Population (2016)
  - Total: 334
- Time zone: UTC+3:30 (IRST)

Mazid (Persian: مزيد) (Note: Also romanized as Mazīd) is a village in Sheykh Fazlolah-e Nuri Rural District of Baladeh District in Nur County, Mazandaran province, Iran.

== Demographics ==
=== Population ===
At the time of the 2006 National Census, the village's population was 177 in 64 households. The following census in 2011 counted 121 people in 52 households. The 2016 census measured the population of the village as 334 people in 127 households.
