= Minak =

Minak میناک
- Village
- Location within Iran
- Coordinates: 36°13′24″N 51°35′32″E
- Country: Iran
- Province: Mazandaran
- County: Nur
- Bakhsh: Baladeh
- Rural District: Owzrud

Population (2016)
  - Total: 137
- Time zone: UTC+3:30 (IRST)
- Website: http://minak.ir

Minak (Persian: میناک, also Romanized as Mīnāk) is a village in Owzrud Rural District, Baladeh District, Nur County, Mazandaran Province, Iran. At the 2016 census, its population was 137, in 57 families. Increased from 55 people in 2006.
