= Valashid =

Valashid or Velashid (Persian: ولاشيد) may refer to:

- Valashid, Nur
- Valashid, Sari

== See also ==
- Valashed
