= Zard Kamar =

Zard Kamar (Persian: زرد كمر) may refer to:

- Zard Kamar, Kurdistan
- Zard Kamar, Mazandaran
