= Owzkola =

Owzkola اوزكلا
- Village
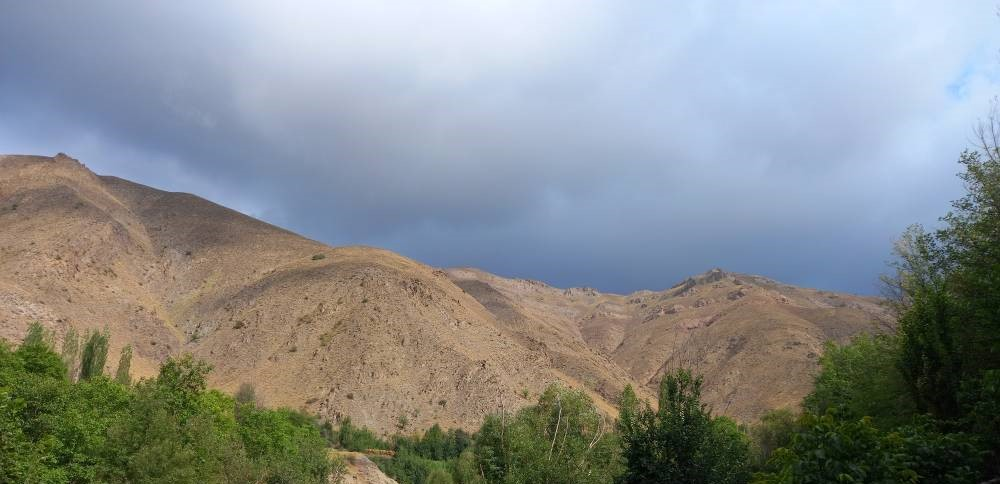

- Location within Iran
- Coordinates: 36°10′54″N 51°39′02″E
- Country: Iran
- Province: Mazandaran
- County: Nur
- Bakhsh: Baladeh
- Rural District: Owzrud

Population (2016)
  - Total: 102
- Time zone: UTC+3:30 (IRST)

Owzkola (Persian: اوزكلا, also Romanized as Owzkolā; also known as Bāghbān Kolā) is a village in Owzrud Rural District, Baladeh District, Nur County, Mazandaran Province, Iran. At the 2016 census, its population was 102, in 43 families. Up from 91 in 2006.

== photos ==
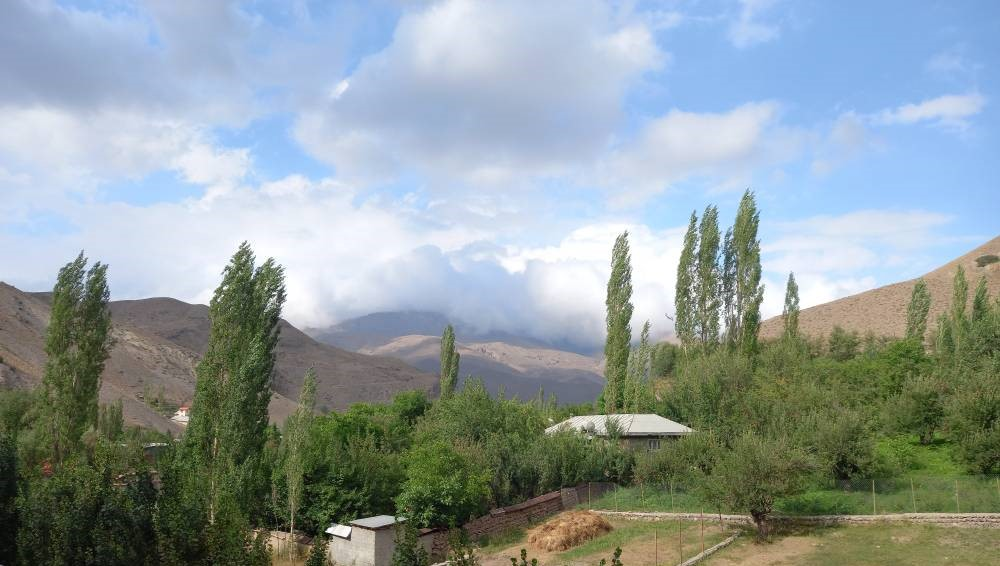

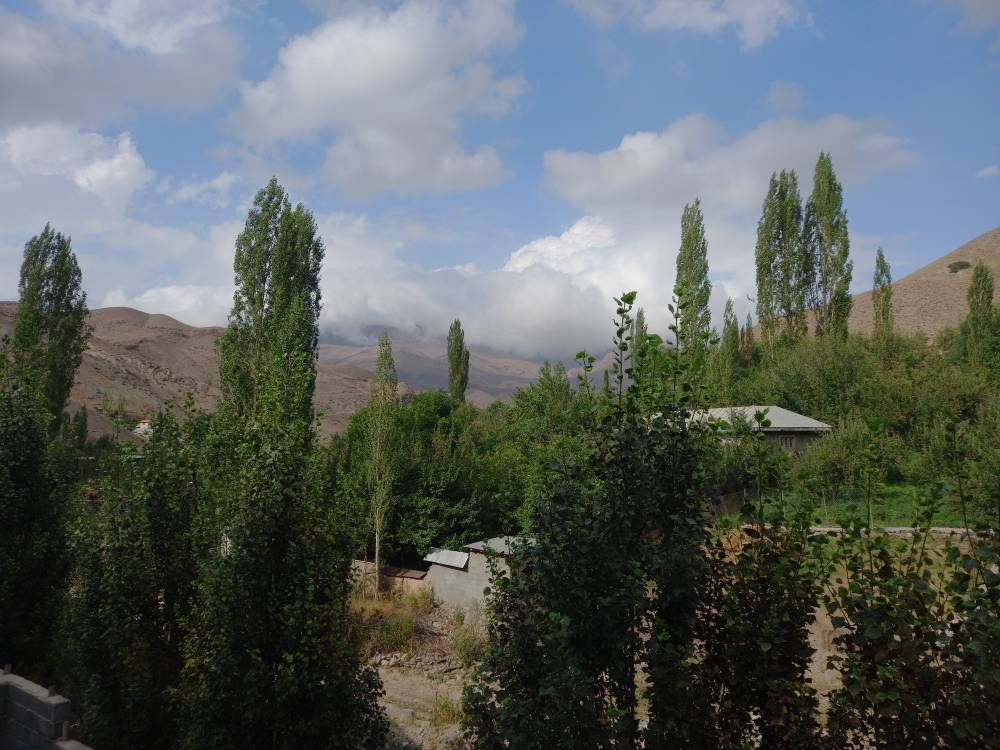

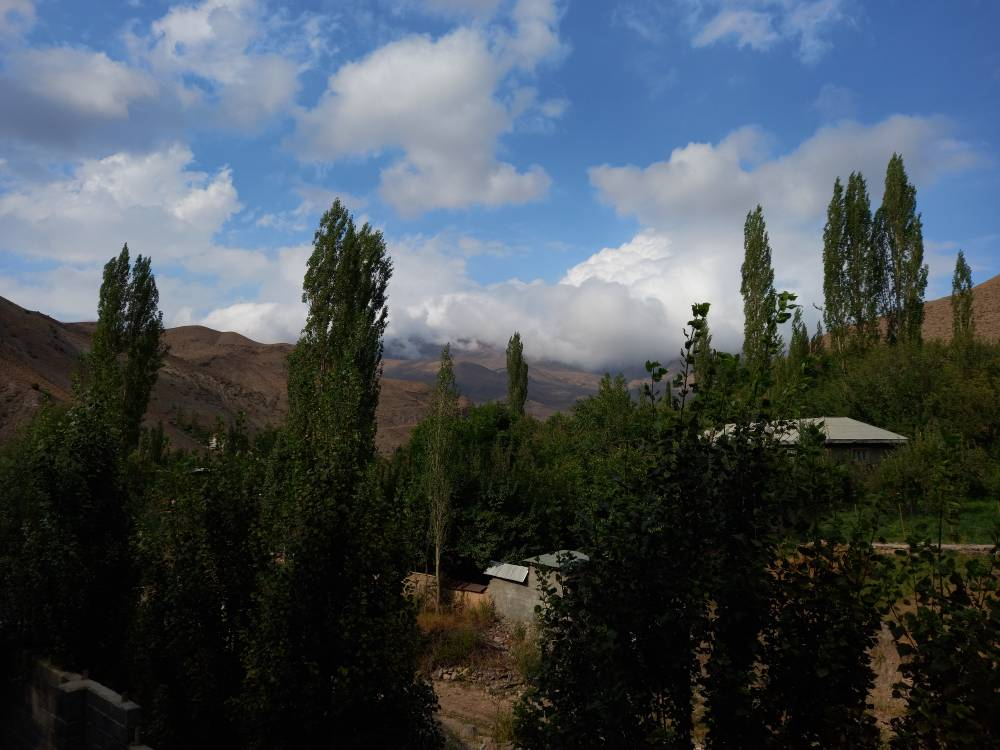

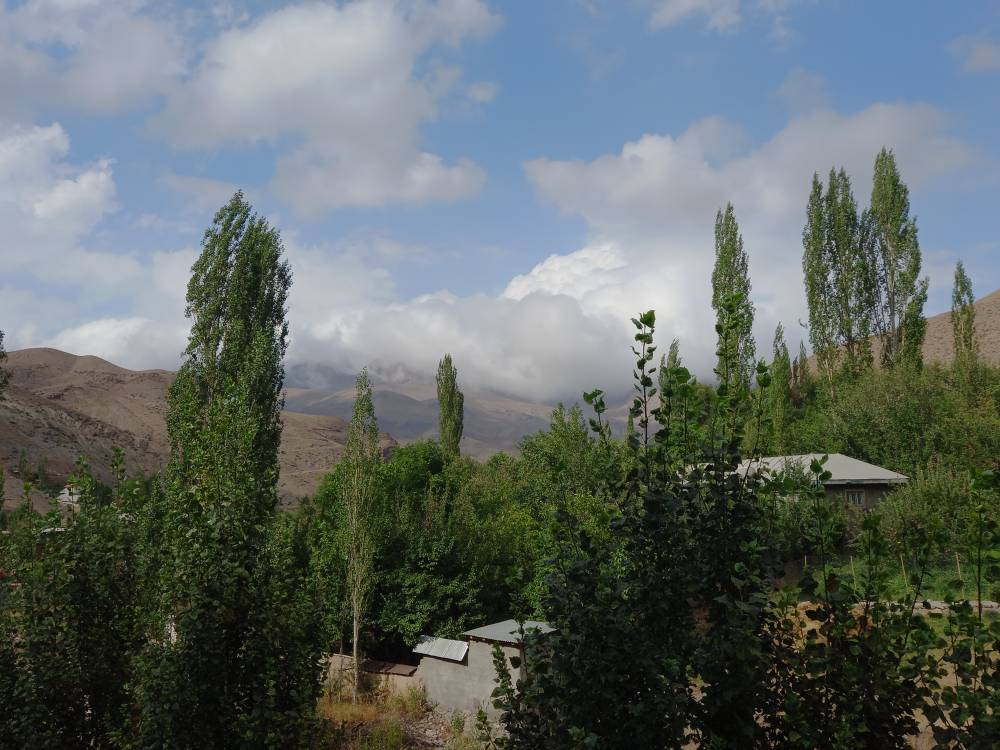

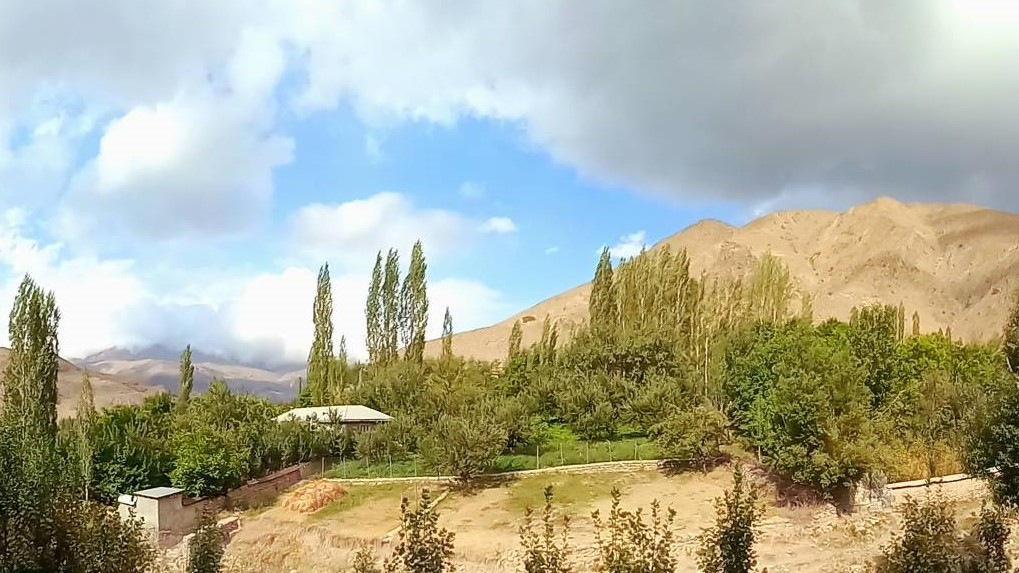

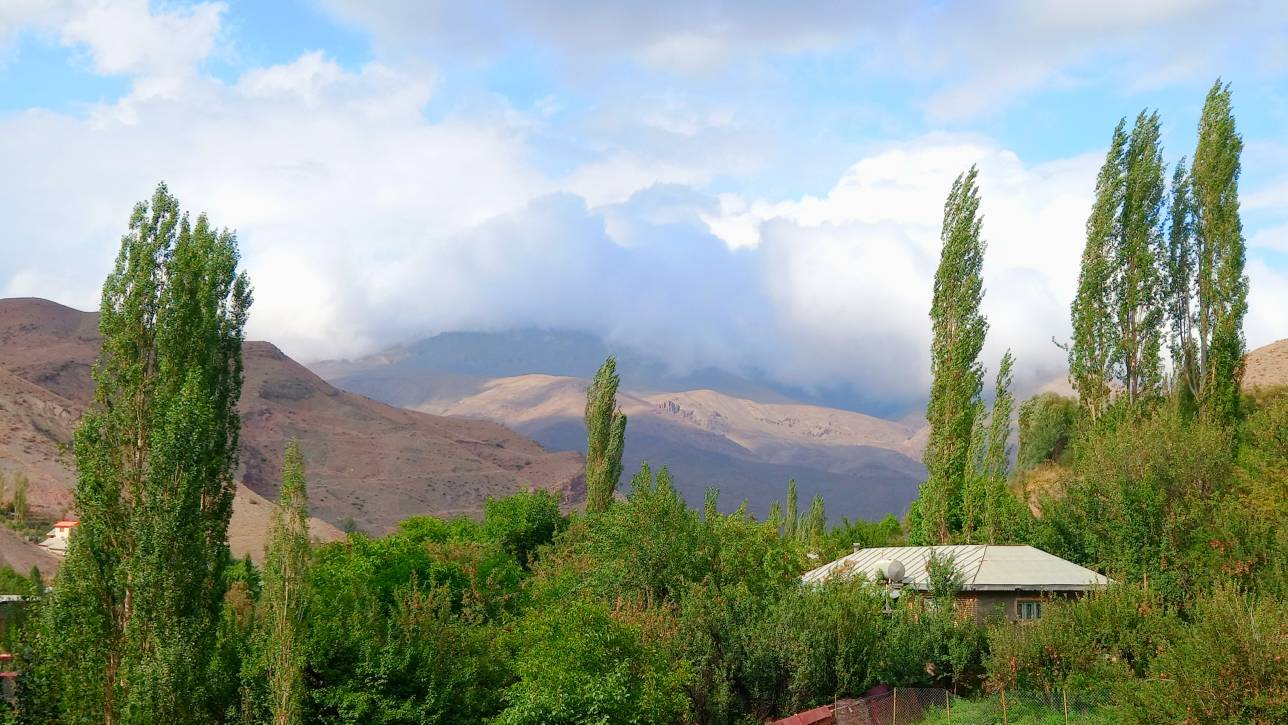

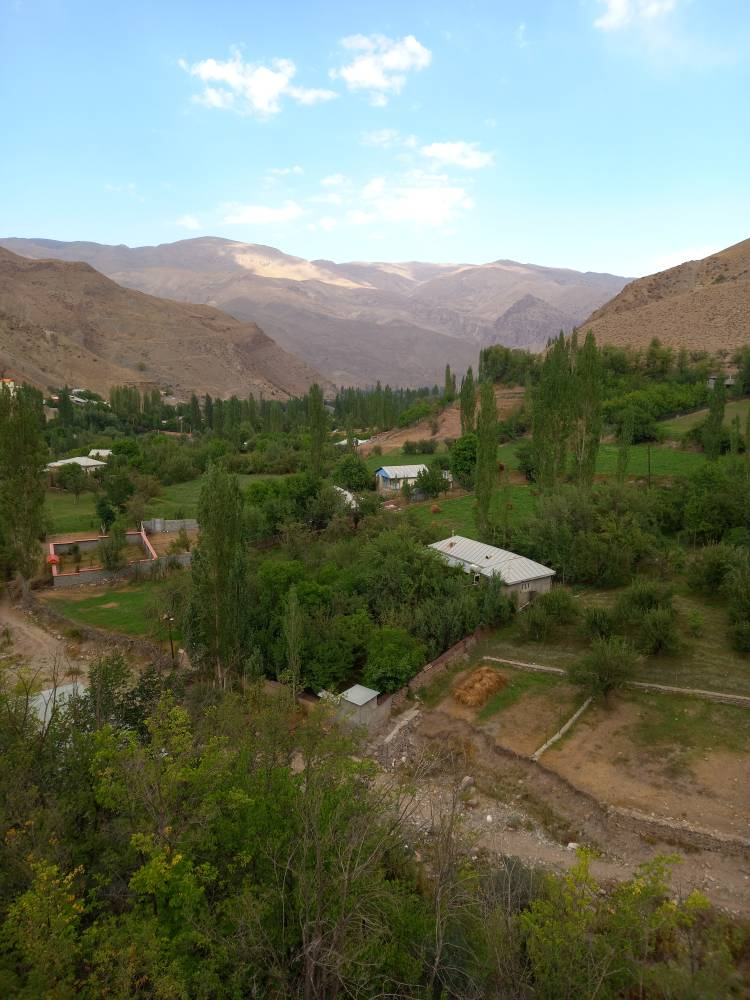

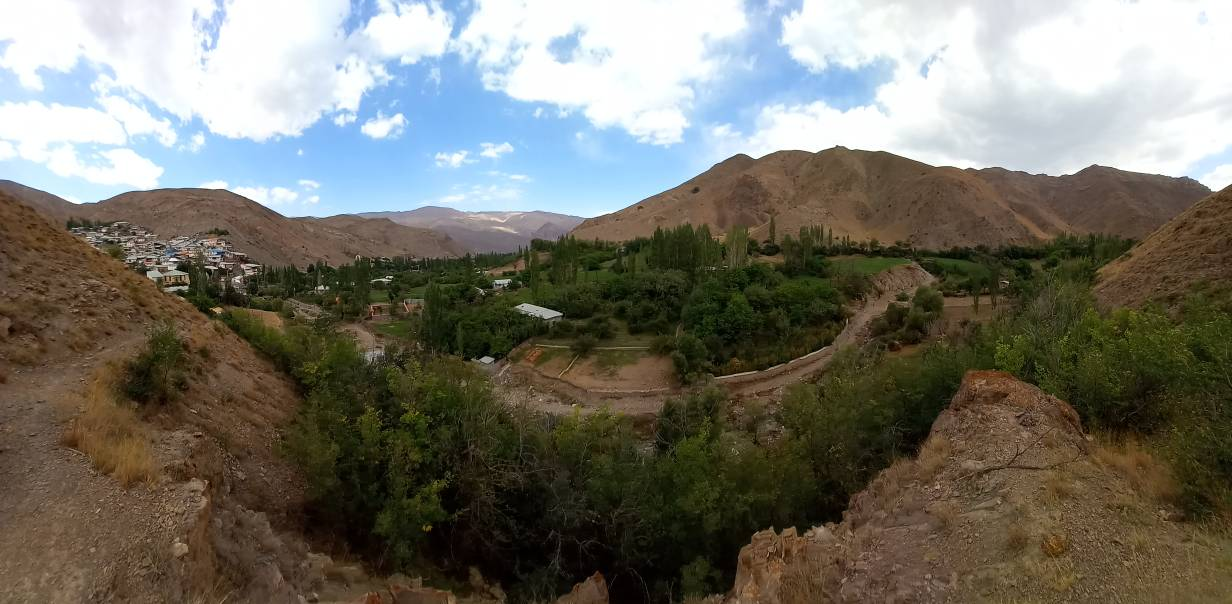

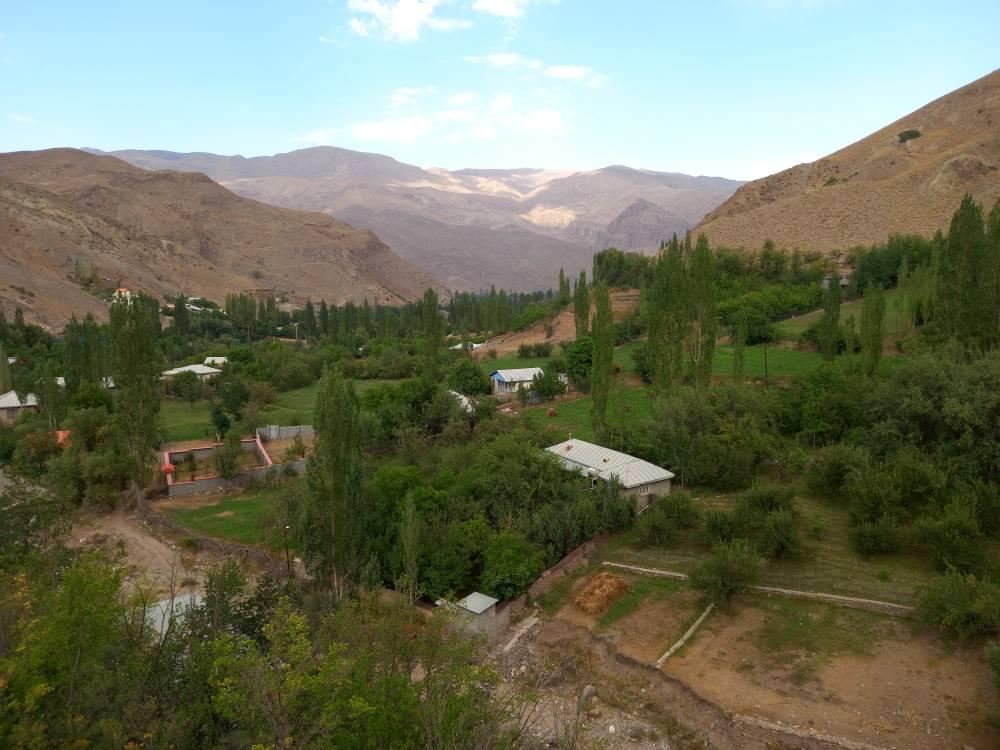

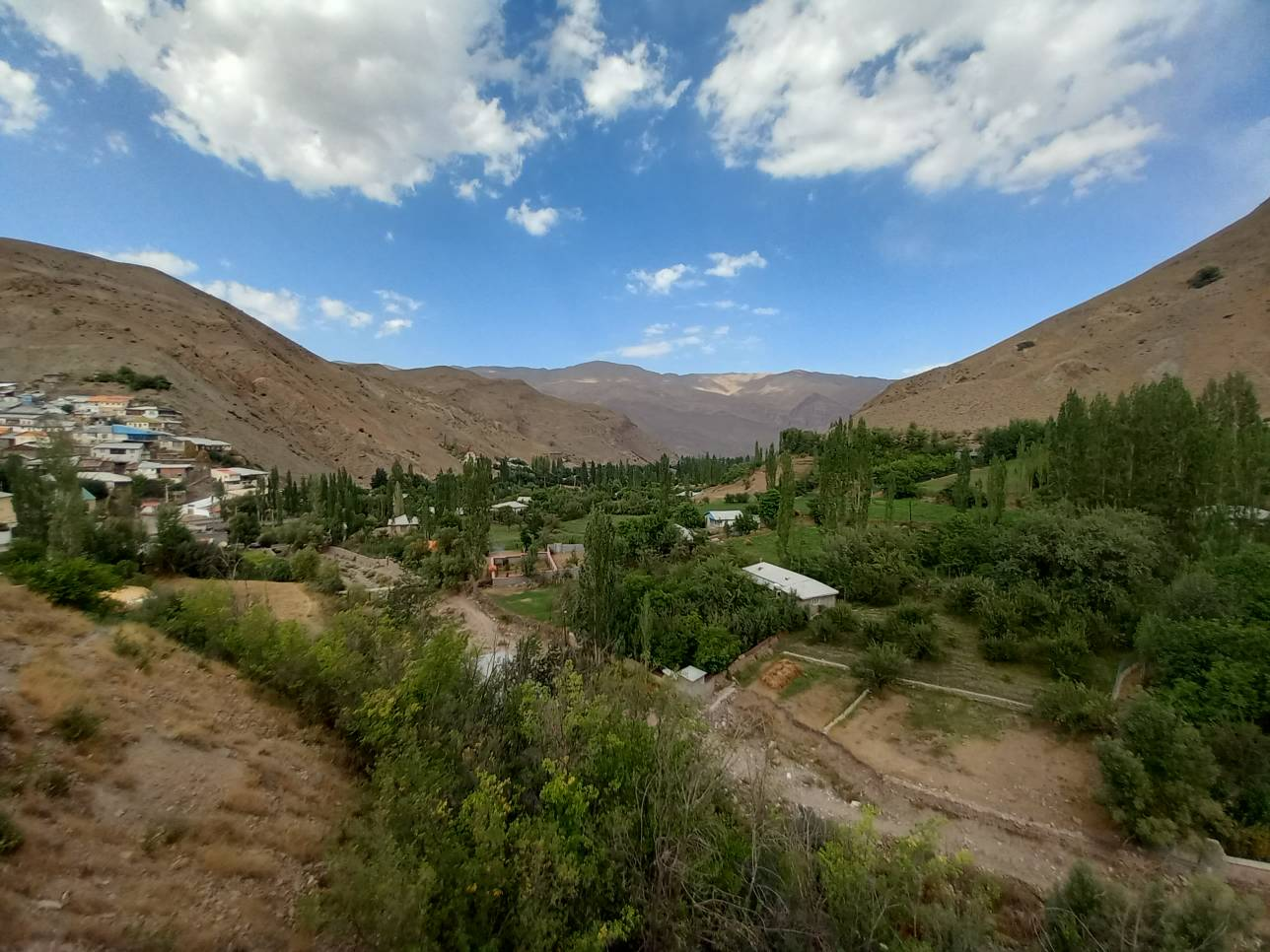

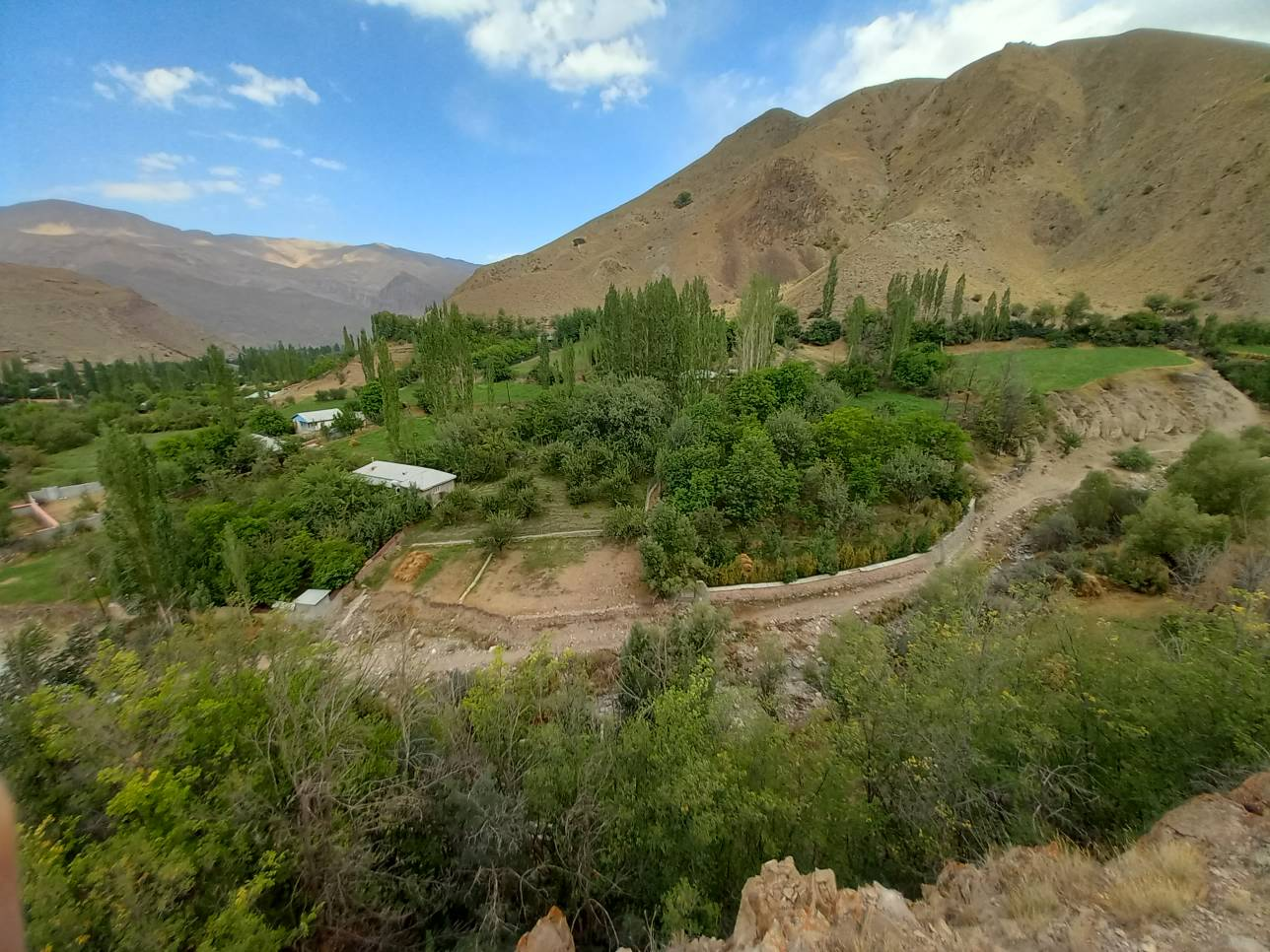

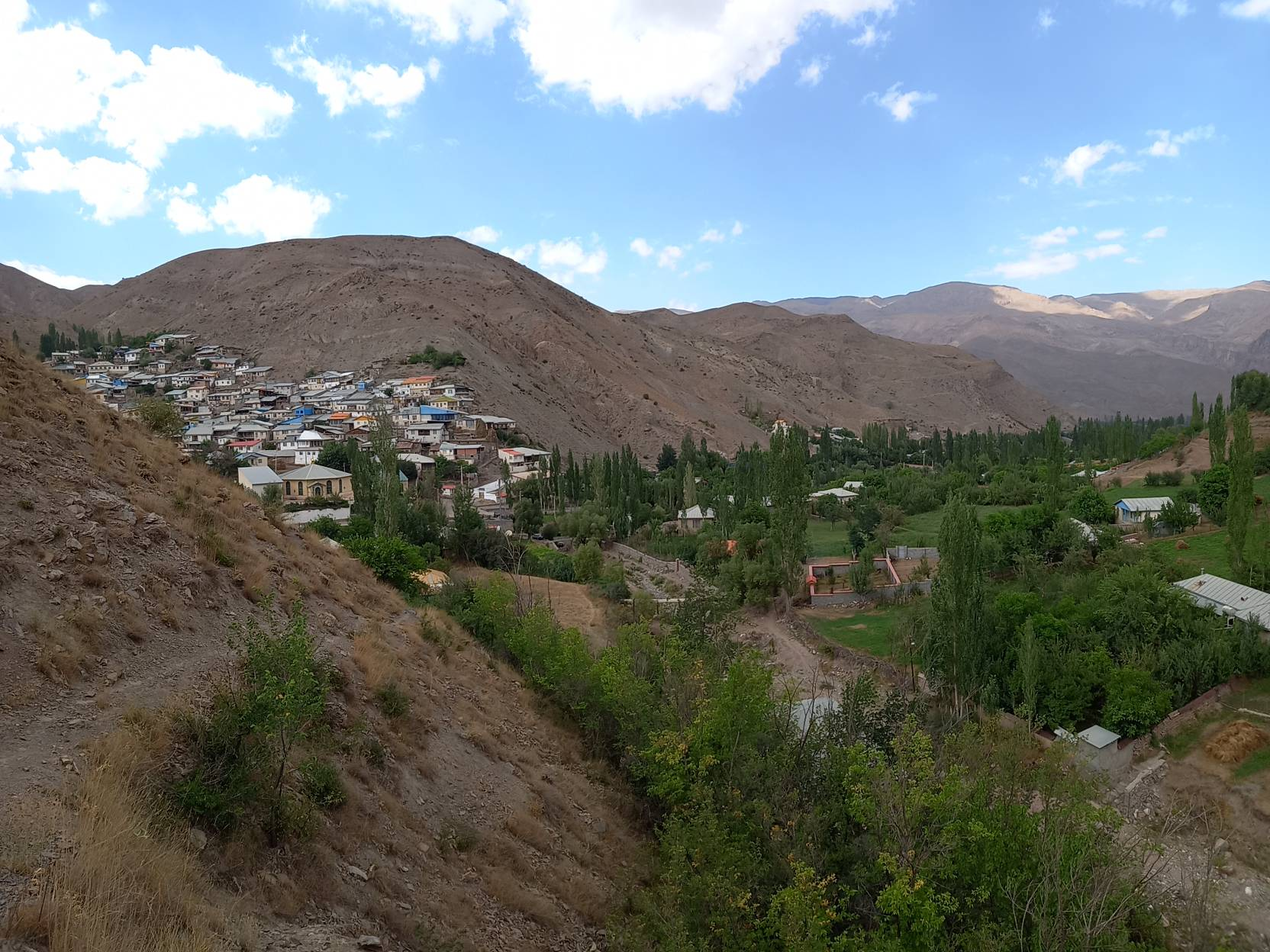

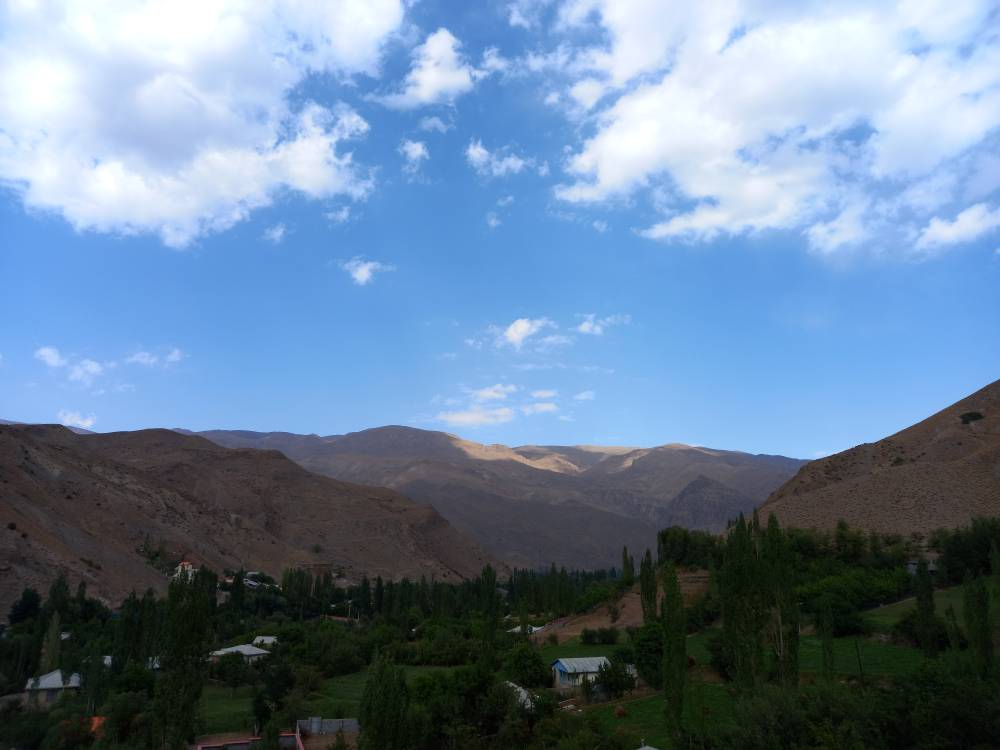

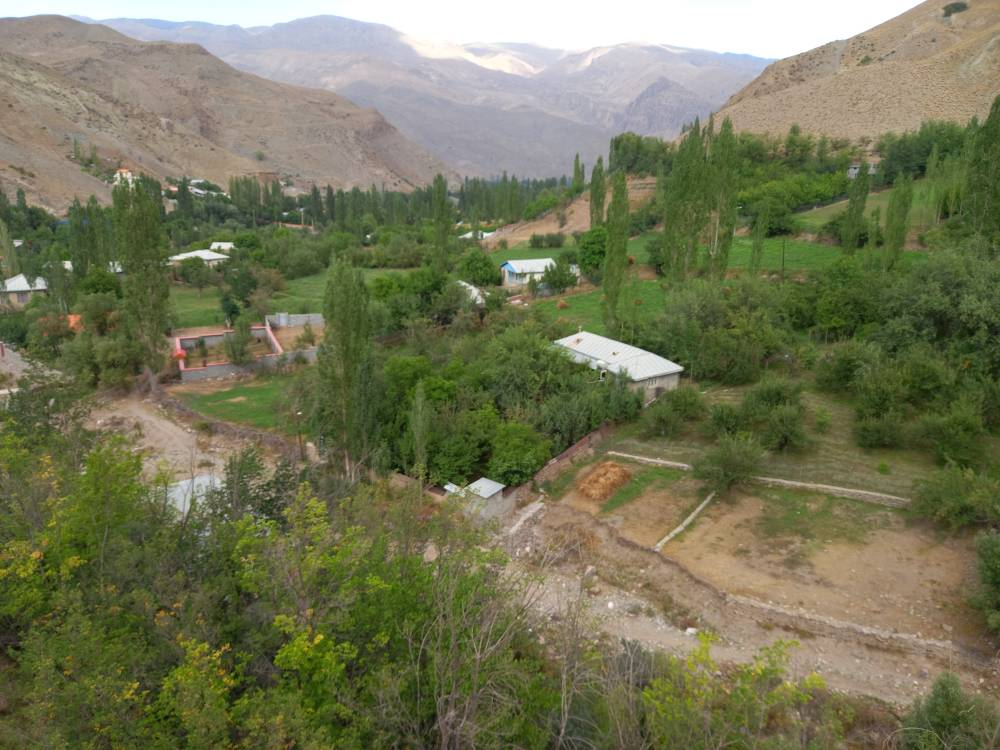

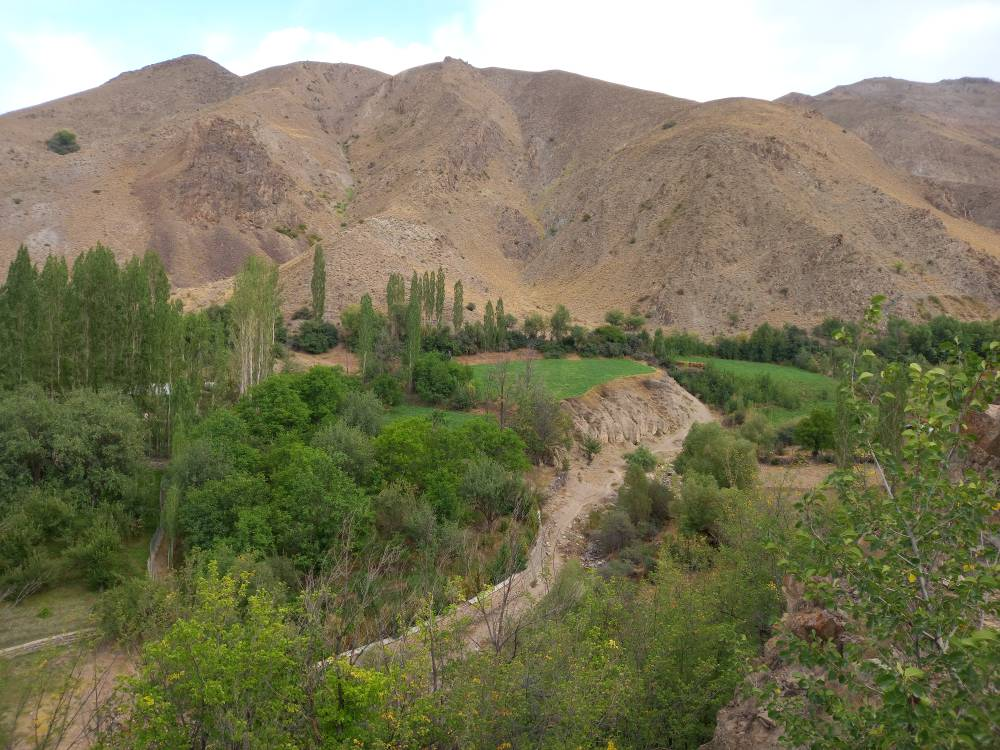

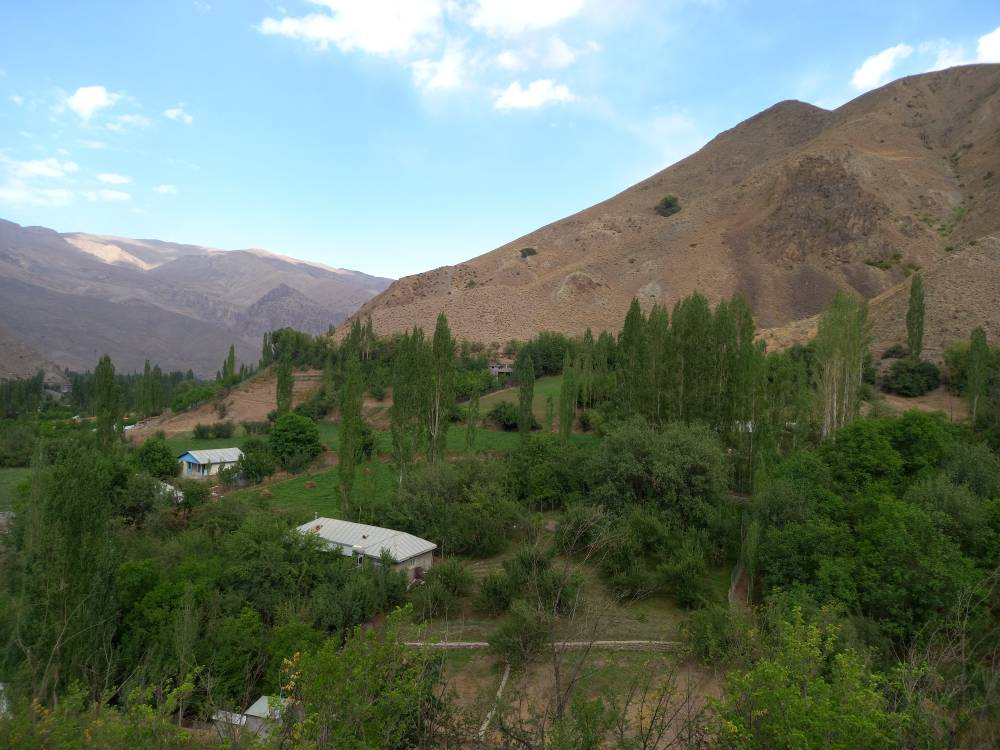
