= Nesen =

Village in Mazandaran province, Iran

Nesen Persian: نسن
- Village
- Location within Iran
- Coordinates: 36°14′07″N 51°29′58″E
- Country: Iran
- Province: Mazandaran
- County: Nur
- District: Baladeh
- Rural District: Owzrud

Population (2016)
  - Total: 182
- Time zone: UTC+3:30 (IRST)

Nesen (Persian: نسن) (Note: Also romanized as Nasan; also known as Nisind) is a village in Owzrud Rural District of Baladeh District in Nur County, Mazandaran province, Iran.

== Demographics ==
=== Population ===
At the time of the 2006 National Census, the village's population was 84 in 33 households. The following census in 2011 counted 33 people in 14 households. The 2016 census measured the population of the village as 182 people in 69 households.
