= Hatar, Iran =

Hatar حطر
- Village
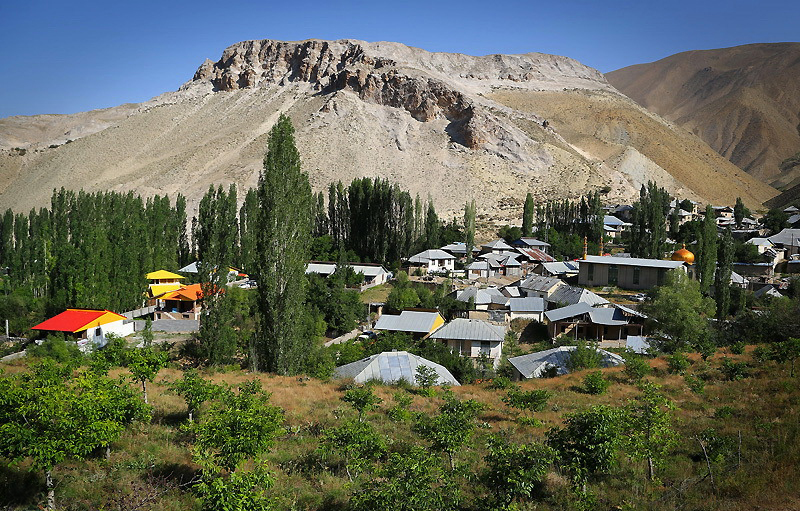

- Location within Iran
- Coordinates: 36°07′43″N 51°52′37″E
- Country: Iran
- Province: Mazandaran
- County: Nur
- Bakhsh: Baladeh
- Rural District: Sheykh Fazlolah-e Nuri

Population (2016)
  - Total: 76
- Time zone: UTC+3:30 (IRST)

Hatar (Persian: حطر, also Romanized as Ḩaţar) is a village in Sheykh Fazlolah-e Nuri Rural District, Baladeh District, Nur County, Mazandaran Province, Iran. At the 2016 census, its population was 76, in 28 families. Up from 42 people in 2006.
