= Betaher Kola =

Village in Mazandaran province, Iran

Betaher Kola Persian: بطاهركلا
- Village
- Location within Iran
- Coordinates: 36°07′14″N 51°43′07″E
- Country: Iran
- Province: Mazandaran
- County: Nur
- District: Baladeh
- Rural District: Sheykh Fazlolah-e Nuri

Population (2016)
  - Total: 278
- Time zone: UTC+3:30 (IRST)

Betaher Kola (Persian: بطاهركلا) (Note: Also romanized as Beţāher Kolā) is a village in Sheykh Fazlolah-e Nuri Rural District of Baladeh District in Nur County, Mazandaran province, Iran.

== Demographics ==
=== Population ===
At the time of the 2006 National Census, the village's population was 102 in 42 households. The following census in 2011 counted 260 people in 92 households. The 2016 census measured the population of the village as 278 people in 102 households.
