= Tatarestaq =

Village in Mazandaran province, Iran

Tatarestaq Persian: تترستاق
- Village
- Location within Iran
- Coordinates: 36°12′49″N 52°10′51″E
- Country: Iran
- Province: Mazandaran
- County: Nur
- District: Baladeh
- Rural District: Tatarestaq

Population (2016)
  - Total: 100
- Time zone: UTC+3:30 (IRST)

Tatarestaq (Persian: تترستاق) (Note: Also romanized as Tatarestāq; also known as Tīrestāq) is a village in Tatarestaq Rural District of Baladeh District in Nur County, Mazandaran province, Iran.

== Demographics ==
=== Population ===
At the time of the 2006 National Census, the village's population was 253 in 88 households. The following census in 2011 counted 189 people in 64 households. The 2016 census measured the population of the village as 100 people in 49 households.
