= Kala, Nur =

Village in Mazandaran province, Iran

Kala Persian: كلا
- Village
- Location within Iran
- Coordinates: 36°09′41″N 51°56′20″E
- Country: Iran
- Province: Mazandaran
- County: Nur
- District: Baladeh
- Rural District: Tatarestaq

Population (2016)
  - Total: 22
- Time zone: UTC+3:30 (IRST)

Kala (Persian: كلا) (Note: Also romanized as Kalā) is a village in Tatarestaq Rural District of Baladeh District in Nur County, Mazandaran province, Iran.

== Demographics ==
=== Population ===
At the time of the 2006 National Census, the village's population was 69 in 23 households. The following census in 2011 counted 23 people in 10 households. The 2016 census measured the population of the village as 22 people in 10 households.
