= Varazan =

Village in Mazandaran province, Iran

Varazan Persian: ورازان
- Village
- Location within Iran
- Coordinates: 36°17′14″N 51°47′22″E
- Country: Iran
- Province: Mazandaran
- County: Nur
- District: Baladeh
- Rural District: Sheykh Fazlolah-e Nuri

Population (2016)
  - Total: 506
- Time zone: UTC+3:30 (IRST)

Varazan (Persian: ورازان) (Note: Also romanized as Varāzān) is a village in Sheykh Fazlolah-e Nuri Rural District of Baladeh District in Nur County, Mazandaran province, Iran.

== Demographics ==
=== Population ===
At the time of the 2006 National Census, the village's population was 645 in 165 households. The following census in 2011 counted 534 people in 166 households. The 2016 census measured the population of the village as 506 people in 148 households, the most populous in its rural district.
