= Iva, Mazandaran =

Village in Mazandaran province, Iran

Iva Persian: ايوا
- Village
- Location within Iran
- Coordinates: 36°11′09″N 52°03′13″E
- Country: Iran
- Province: Mazandaran
- County: Nur
- District: Baladeh
- Rural District: Tatarestaq

Population (2016)
  - Total: 76
- Time zone: UTC+3:30 (IRST)

Iva (Persian: ايوا) (Note: Also romanized as Īvā) is a village in Tatarestaq Rural District of Baladeh District in Nur County, Mazandaran province, Iran.

== Demographics ==
=== Population ===
At the time of the 2006 National Census, the village's population was 42 in 21 households. The following census in 2011 counted 27 people in 14 households. The 2016 census measured the population of the village as 76 people in 39 households.
