= Tatarestaq Rural District =

Rural district in Mazandaran province, Iran

Tatarestaq Rural District Persian: دهستان تتارستاق
- Rural District
- Location within Iran
- Coordinates: 36°10′N 52°05′E
- Country: Iran
- Province: Mazandaran
- County: Nur
- District: Baladeh
- Established: 1987
- Capital: Takar

Population (2016)
  - Total: 977
- Time zone: UTC+3:30 (IRST)

Tatarestaq Rural District (Persian: دهستان تتارستاق) is in Baladeh District of Nur County, Mazandaran province, Iran. Its capital is the village of Takar.

== Demographics ==
=== Population ===
At the time of the 2006 National Census, the rural district's population was 1,535 in 536 households. There were 975 inhabitants in 407 households at the following census of 2011. The 2016 census measured the population of the rural district as 977 in 469 households. The most populous of its 23 villages was Korsi, with 186 people.

=== Other villages in the rural district ===
- Il
- Iva
- Kala
- Noj
- Razan
- Tatarestaq
- Valashid
