= Baladeh, Mazandaran =

City in Mazandaran province, Iran

Baladeh Persian: بلده
- City
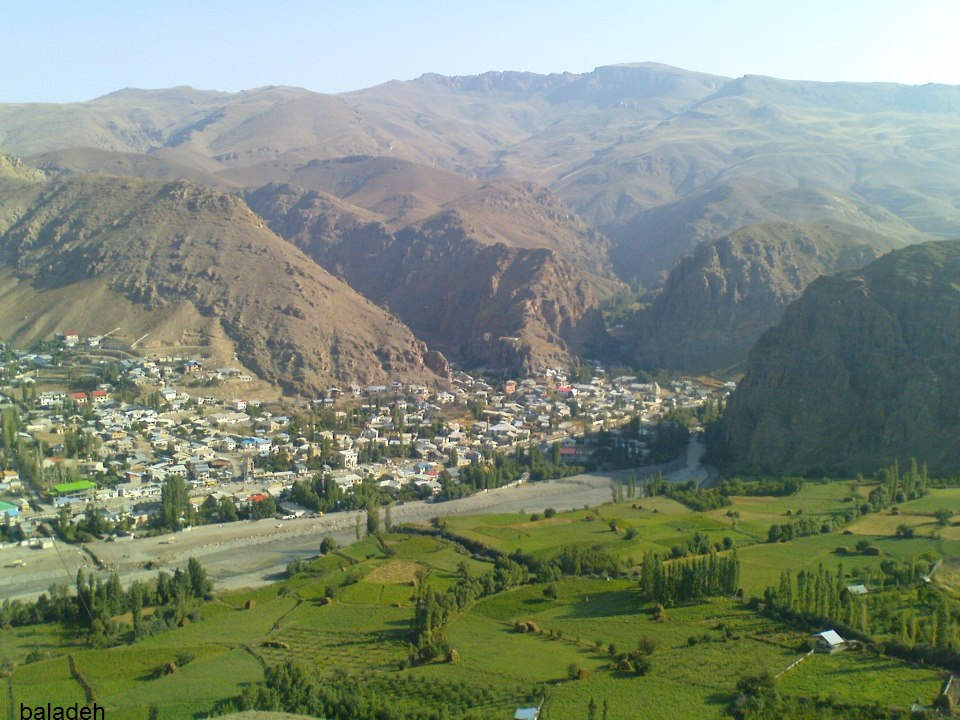
- The city of Baladeh

- Location within Iran
- Coordinates: 36°12′02″N 51°48′34″E
- Country: Iran
- Province: Mazandaran
- County: Nur
- District: Baladeh

Population (2016)
  - Total: 970
- Time zone: UTC+3:30 (IRST)

Baladeh (Persian: بلده) is a city in, and the capital of, Baladeh District in Nur County, Mazandaran province, Iran. It also serves as the administrative center for Sheykh Fazlolah-e Nuri Rural District. Baladeh is on the Nur River.

== Demographics ==
=== Population ===
At the time of the 2006 National Census, the city's population was 1,134 in 339 households. The following census in 2011 counted 1,037 people in 302 households. The 2016 census measured the population of the city as 970 people in 353 households.

== History ==
=== Baladeh castle ===
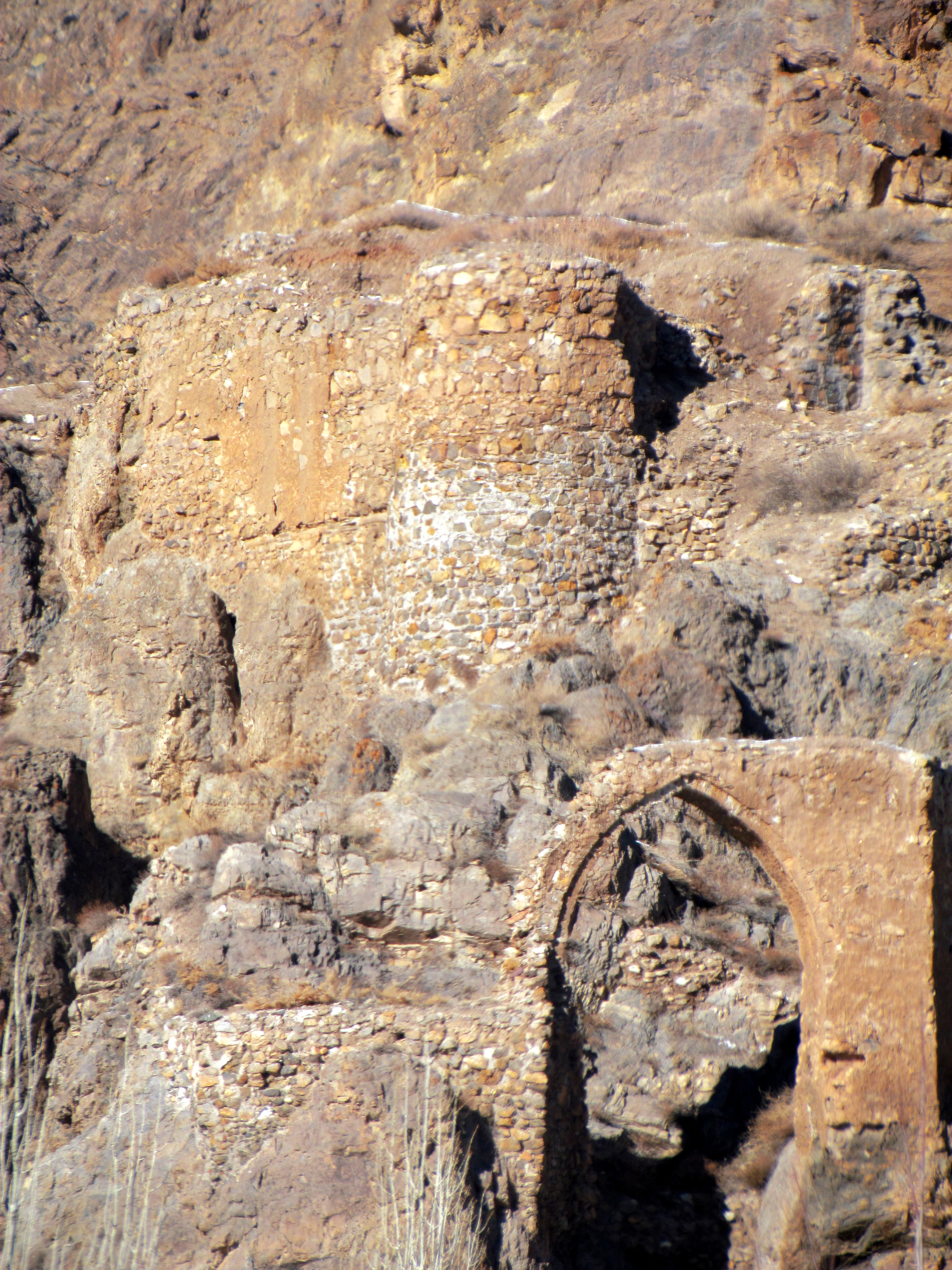
Baladeh castle

Baladeh castle is one of the important fortress among the other castles in Mazandaran province. The castle was established even in the early Safavid era. It was made on top of the mount and can be seen from the city. After the defeat of the Paduspani dynasty, the Safavids seized the castle. It was in use as recently as the 18th century although its origins go back at least to 700 C.E.

== See also ==
- Nima Yooshij
