= Alika (village) =

Elika اليكا
- Village
- Location within Iran
- Coordinates: 36°12′35″N 51°24′27″E
- Country: Iran
- Province: Mazandaran
- County: Nur
- Bakhsh: Baladeh
- Rural District: Owzrud

Population (2016)
  - Total: 43
- Time zone: UTC+3:30 (IRST)

Elika or Alika or Ileka (Persian: اليكا, also Romanized as Ālīkā; also known as Īlīkā and Īlkā) is a village in Owzrud Rural District, Baladeh District, Nur County, Mazandaran Province, Iran on the road from Tehran to the Caspian Sea (Chaloos Road). It is close to Yush, where the famous Iranian poet Nima Yushij was born. The village was known for coal mines that were harvested during the 1930s until the 1970s.

At the 2016 census, its population was 43 people in 17 households.
