= Dunay-e Sofla =

Village in Mazandaran province, Iran

Dunay-e Sofla Persian: دوناي سفلي
- Village
- Location within Iran
- Coordinates: 36°11′49″N 51°21′58″E
- Country: Iran
- Province: Mazandaran
- County: Nur
- District: Baladeh
- Rural District: Owzrud

Population (2016)
  - Total: 256
- Time zone: UTC+3:30 (IRST)

Dunay-e Sofla (Persian: دوناي سفلي) (Note: Also romanized as Dūnāy-e Soflá; also known as Dūnā-ye Pā’īn and Dūnā-ye Soflá) is a village in Owzrud Rural District of Baladeh District in Nur County, Mazandaran province, Iran.

== Demographics ==
=== Population ===
At the time of the 2006 National Census, the village's population was 502 in 127 households. The following census in 2011 counted 225 people in 80 households. The 2016 census measured the population of the village as 256 people in 91 households.
