= Owzrud Rural District =

Rural district in Mazandaran province, Iran

Owzrud Rural District Persian: دهستان اوزرود
- Rural District
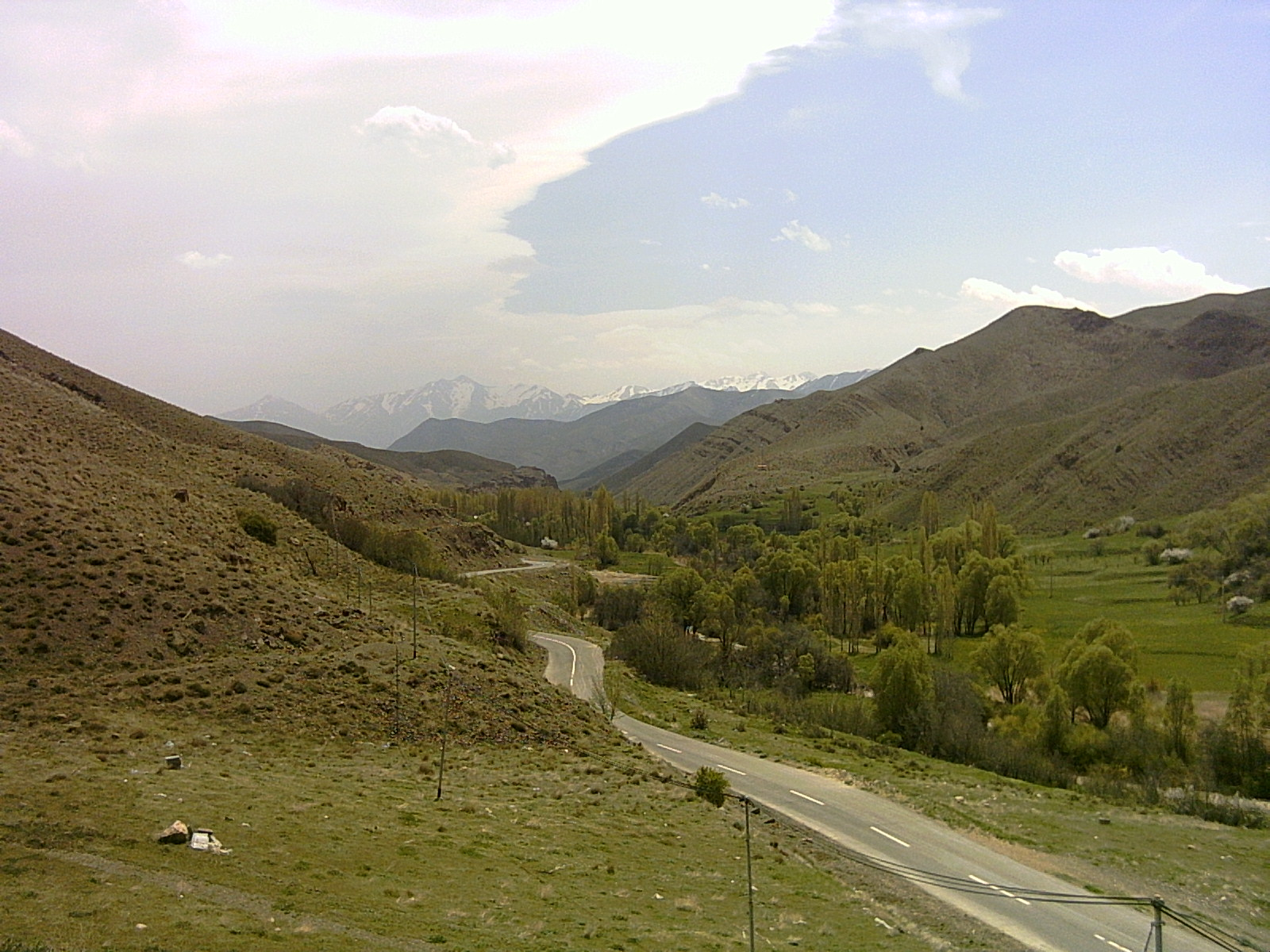
- Baladeh Road running through the Owzrud Valley

- Location within Iran
- Coordinates: 36°10′N 51°31′E
- Country: Iran
- Province: Mazandaran
- County: Nur
- District: Baladeh
- Established: 1987
- Capital: Pil

Population (2016)
  - Total: 2,452
- Time zone: UTC+3:30 (IRST)

Owzrud Rural District (Persian: دهستان اوزرود) is in Baladeh District of Nur County, Mazandaran province, Iran. Its capital is the village of Pil.

== Demographics ==
=== Population ===
At the time of the 2006 National Census, the rural district's population was 1,811 in 598 households. There were 1,400 inhabitants in 567 households at the following census of 2011. The 2016 census measured the population of the rural district as 2,452 in 929 households. The most populous of its 16 villages was Dunay-e Olya, with 273 people.

=== Other villages in the rural district ===
- Alika
- Angerud
- Dunay-e Sofla
- Kalavangah
- Kamarbon
- Kelak-e Olya
- Kelak-e Sofla
- Minak
- Nahiyeh
- Nesen
- Niknam Deh
- Owz
- Owzkola
- Pichdeh
