= Dunay-e Olya =

Village in Mazandaran province, Iran

Dunay-e Olya Persian: دوناي عليا
- Village
- Location within Iran
- Coordinates: 36°11′44″N 51°22′22″E
- Country: Iran
- Province: Mazandaran
- County: Nur
- District: Baladeh
- Rural District: Owzrud

Population (2016)
  - Total: 273
- Time zone: UTC+3:30 (IRST)

Dunay-e Olya (Persian: دوناي عليا) (Note: Also romanized as Dūnāy-e ‘Olyā; also known as Dūnā, Dūnā-ye Bālā, and Dūnā-ye ‘Olyā) is a village in Owzrud Rural District of Baladeh District in Nur County, Mazandaran province, Iran.

== Demographics ==
=== Population ===
At the time of the 2006 National Census, the village's population was 290 in 68 households. The following census in 2011 counted 365 people in 120 households. The 2016 census measured the population of the village as 273 people in 94 households, the most populous in its rural district.
