= Valashid, Nur =

Village in Mazandaran province, Iran

Valashid Persian: ولاشيد
- Village
- Location within Iran
- Coordinates: 36°12′08″N 51°55′26″E
- Country: Iran
- Province: Mazandaran
- County: Nur
- District: Baladeh
- Rural District: Tatarestaq

Population (2016)
  - Total: 102
- Time zone: UTC+3:30 (IRST)

Valashid (Persian: ولاشيد) (Note: Also romanized as Valāshīd; also known as Valāshed) is a village in Tatarestaq Rural District of Baladeh District in Nur County, Mazandaran province, Iran.

== Demographics ==
=== Population ===
At the time of the 2006 National Census, the village's population was 120 in 35 households. The following census in 2011 counted 84 people in 34 households. The 2016 census measured the population of the village as 102 people in 38 households.
