= Kelak-e Olya =

Kelak-e Olya کلاک علیا
- Village
- Location within Iran
- Coordinates: 36°11′32″N 51°33′01″E
- Country: Iran
- Province: Mazandaran
- County: Nur
- Bakhsh: Baladeh
- Rural District: Owzrud

Population (2016)
  - Total: 111
- Time zone: UTC+3:30 (IRST)

Kelak-e Olya (Persian: کلاک علیا, also Romanized as Kelāk-e ‘Olyā; also known as Kelāk-e Bālā) is a village in Owzrud Rural District, Baladeh District, Nur County, Mazandaran Province, Iran. At the 2016 census, its population was 111, in 40 families. Up from 95 in 2006.
