= Mirza Husain Noori Tabarsi =

Shi'a Islamic Akhbari scholar

Mirza Husain Noori Tabarsi Mazandarani
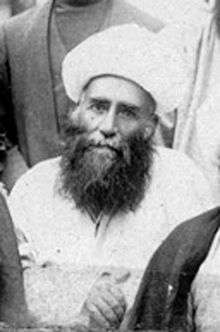
- Mirza Noori Tabrasi
- Born: 3 January 1839; Pichdeh, Nur, Mazandaran, Qajar Persia
- Died: 29 September 1902 (aged 64); Najaf, Iraq
- Notable work: Mustadrak al-Wasāʼil; An-Najm Al-Thāqib; Salman The Persian; LoʼLoʼ va Marjān
- Title: Allamah Nouri, Khatm al-Muhaddithin, Muhaddith Noori
- Parent(s): Mohammad Taqi Noori دورهٔ نوزایی , عصر نوزایی , دورهٔ نوزایش شیعه اسلامی
- Religion: Shi'a Islam
- Denomination: Akhbari

Mirza Husain Noori Tabarsi (Persian: میرزا حسین نوری طبرسی, Arabic: الميرزا حسين النوري الطبرسي) (3 January 1839 – 29 September 1902), commonly known as Muhaddith Noori, was a controversial Shi'a Islamic scholar of the Shi'a Renaissance. His most famous work is the 18-volume Hadith collection Mustadrak al-Wasa'il.

He came from the town of Noor, Northern Iran in province Tabarestan and was a descendant of the Paduspanids, Spahbed of East dynasty. Mirza Husain Nouri died at the age of 66 years in Najaf and was laid to rest on the right side of the entrance to the Mausoleum of Imam Ali.

== Life ==
Noori was born on 18 Shawwal 1254 AH (3 January 1839 (Note: Converted using hijiricalendars.com. English version: Both accessed 25 July 2024.)) at the northern Iranian city of Noor in Mazandaran. Following the completion of his preliminary studies, he strove to scrutinize the vast hadith literature and became an authority in this regard.

== Education ==
Noori studied in Iraq under Morteza Ansari and Mirza Mohammed Hassan Husseini Shirazi.

Noori's masters were:

- Clergyman Mola Fatholah Soltan Abadi
- Molla Shekh Ali Khalili, the jurisprudent
- Mo’ez aldin Seyed Mehdi Ghazvini
- Mirza Mohammad Hashem Khansari
- Ayatollah Haj Molla Kani

== Views ==
=== Qur'an ===
In his work Fasl al-Khitab fi Tahrif Kitab Rabb al-Arbab, Noori argues the Qur'an is indeed Itmam al-Hujjah in its present form however it is not the entire revealed revelation to Prophet Muhammad.

=== Usul ===
He viewed Usul and practice of Ijtihad as an addition that Shi'ism borrowed from Sunni Islam; for him a faqīh may only rule from the Four Books, as well as other Shi'a Ahadith, all of which he views as immediately representing the opinions of the Imams, as well as mystical experiences like visions, and even dreams.

=== Ahadith ===
Muhaddith Noori viewed all Shi'a Hadith as being fully authentic, going so far as to collect virtually all obscure, neglelcted or discarded Shi'a Ahadith in his work Mustadrak al-Wasa'il, deeming them all fully authentic; controversially, he used the work to revive narrations that were suppressed by the authors of the Four Books, especially the ones omitted by Shaykh Saduq.

== Some of his works ==
Noori was an authority on Islamic sciences, including hadith, exegesis of the Holy Qur'an, theology, and biography of ulema. He had numerous students, including Shaikh Abbas Qomi, the author of the famous prayer and supplication manual "Mafatih al-Jinaan" (Keys of Paradise). He wrote numerous works in both Persian and Arabic, many of them were translated to other languages including English and Urdu. His works include:

- Mustadrak al-Wasāʼil wa-mustanbaṭ al-masāʼil (in Arabic): One of the major Shia Hadith-collection books comprising approximately 18 volumes, containing many hadiths which dropped from the Wasa'il al-Shia.
- An-Najm Al-Thāqib fī Aḥwāl Al-Imām Al-Ḥujja Al-Ghāʼeb (in Arabic, translated to English as the Shooting star): a comprehensive book regarding the twelfth Imam of Twelver Shias, written originally in Persian, and was translated lately to English, Arabic and Urdu.
- Kashf Al-Astār ʿAn Wajh Al-Ghāʼeb ʿAn Al-Abṣār (in Arabic): refutation of Sunnis contentions regarding the twelfth Imam.
- Jannat Al-Maʼwā fīman Fāz Biliqāʼ Al-Ḥujja fī Al-Ghayba Al-Kubrā (in Arabic): a collection of tales of those who claim to have met the twelfth Imam during the Major Occultation period.
- LoʼLoʼ va Marjān (in Persian): a guide on etiquette, and critique of common behavior of the preachers and Maddahi of his time.
- Nafas Ar-Raḥmān fī Faḍāʼil Salmān (in Arabic and Persian): a biography of Salman the Persian.
- Al-Fayḍ Al-Qudsī fī tarjamat al-ʿAllāmah al-Majlisī (in Arabic): a comprehensive biography of the 17th century renowned cleric Muhammad Baqir Majlisi, printed with commentary on the Biḥār al-Anwār, which was later printed separately.
- Faṣl al-khiṭāb fī ithbāt taḥrīf kitāb Rabb al-arbāb (in Arabic): a book outlining His controversial views in the Qur'an.
- Min Behar Al Anwar Maa Takmila (in Arabic): a commentary on the Bihar al-Anwar, which was originally printed together with his biography on Baqir al-Majlisi.
- Dār As-Salām fīmā Yataʿallaq Bi Ar-Ruʼyā wal Manām (in Arabic): a treatise on mystical dream interpretation.
- Jannat al-Maʼwá: fī dhikr man fāza bi-liqāʼ al-ḥujjah (in Arabic): an explanation on how to meet the twelfth Imam.
- al-Ṣaḥīfah al-ʻAlawīyah al-mubārakah al-thānīyah: min adʻīyat al-Imām ʻAlī ibn Abī Ṭālib (in Arabic): a historical account of the Mushaf of Ali
- Kitāb kalimah ṭayyibah (in Persian and Arabic): containing Prayers and Du'as.
- Risālah fī ādāb al-mujāwarah: mujāwarat mashāhid al-Aʼimmah (in Arabic): describes etiquette and precautions for the Ziyarat to the Tombs of the Imams.
- Muḥammad ibn al-Ḥasan al-Ḥurr al-ʻĀmilī's Wasāʼil al-Shīʻah ilá taḥṣīl masāʼil al-sharīʻah (in Arabic): commentary on Wasa'il al-Shia.
- Taḥiyat al-zāʼir wa-bulqhat al-mujāwir (2 editions published in 1909 in Persian): conduct for those living near the Tombs of the Imams, or guarding their Shrines.

== Death ==
Noori died in Najaf on 27 Jumada al-Thani 1320 AH (29 September 1902), at the age of 66. He was buried on the right side of the entrance to the Mausoleum of Imam Ali.

== Allameh Mohaddes Nouri University ==
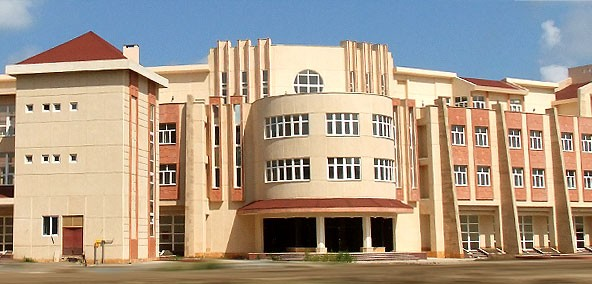
Main campus of Allameh Mohaddes Nouri University in Noor, Iran

Allameh Mohaddes Nouri University (AMNU; Persian: دانشگاه علامه محدث نوری), formerly known as the Institute of Higher Education, is a non-governmental, non-profit university founded in 1996 in the town of Noor, Iran. The university was established under an official license from Iran's Ministry of Science, Research and Technology (MSRT) and aims to advance knowledge, science, and technology, as well as to train skilled and creative students at the undergraduate and graduate levels. The institution is named after Noori.
