= Niknam Deh, Mazandaran =

Niknam Deh نيكنام ده
- Village
- Location within Iran
- Coordinates: 36°12′17″N 51°38′33″E
- Country: Iran
- Province: Mazandaran
- County: Nur
- Bakhsh: Baladeh
- Rural District: Owzrud

Population (2016)
  - Total: 142
- Time zone: UTC+3:30 (IRST)

Niknam Deh (Persian: نيكنام ده, also Romanized as Nīknām Deh; also known as Vālāmeh and Vanāmeh) is a village in Owzrud Rural District, Baladeh District, Nur County, Mazandaran Province, Iran. At the 2016 census, its population was 142, in 62 families.
