= Chel, Iran =

Village in Mazandaran province, Iran

Chel Persian: چل
- Village
- Location within Iran
- Coordinates: 36°10′41″N 51°51′57″E
- Country: Iran
- Province: Mazandaran
- County: Nur
- District: Baladeh
- Rural District: Sheykh Fazlolah-e Nuri

Population (2016)
  - Total: 214
- Time zone: UTC+3:30 (IRST)

Chel (Persian: چل) is a village in Sheykh Fazlolah-e Nuri Rural District of Baladeh District in Nur County, Mazandaran province, Iran.

== Demographics ==
=== Population ===
At the time of the 2006 National Census, the village's population was 130 in 42 households. The following census in 2011 counted 124 people in 52 households. The 2016 census measured the population of the village as 214 people in 80 households.
