= Allameh Mohaddes Nouri University =

Non-profit university in the north of Iran

- دانشگاه علامه محدث نوری; Dāneshgāh-e Allameh Mohaddes-e Nouri
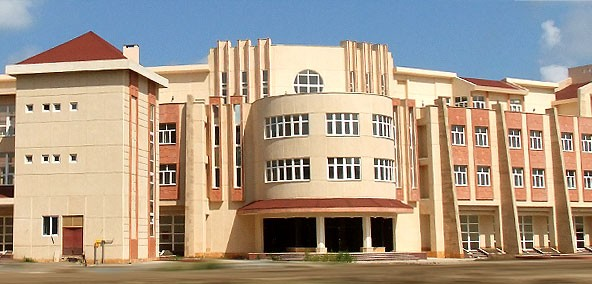
- Allameh Mohaddes Nouri University's coat of arms
- Type: Private
- Established: 1996
- Affiliations: FUIW
- Chancellor: Dr. Mahmoud Emami Namini
- Vice-Chancellor: Dr. Shahryar Tamandani
- Students: 4000
- Location: Nur County, Iran; 36.5564°N 52.025°E
- Campus: Urban
- Colours: Blue
- Website: http://www.Mohaddes.ac.ir/
- Location in Iran

Allameh Mohaddes Nouri University or AMNU (Persian: [دانشگاه علامه محدث نوری]); is a non-profit university in the north of Iran which admits students either through the National Entrance Examination or on the basis of the applicants' prior school profile. The university was established in 1996 and is located in the town of Nūr in Mazandaran, Iran. It was promoted from an 'institute of higher education' to 'university' status in April, 2014 and stood first in the scientific-educational ranking of non-profit universities by Iran's Ministry of Science, Research and Technology.

== History ==
Following a decision in April 1996 by the Council of Higher Education Development affiliated to Iran's Ministry of Science, Research and Technology and, later, an official announcement in June 1996 by the Minister of Culture and Higher Education, Allameh Mohaddes Nouri Institute of Higher Education was established.

The institute opened its doors to 68 students and two major fields in B.A. programs in Accounting and Economic Sciences (Commercial). It has 53 majors, three faculties, around 4000 students and 50 academic staff.

The names of the Board of the university are as follows:

- Dr. Mahmoud Emami Namin (Chancellor)
- Mrs. Maryam Hojjati (Vice-Chancellor for Financial and Administrative Affairs)
- Dr. Shahryar Tamandani (Vice-Chancellor for Education)
- Dr. Mahmoud Emami Namin (Vice-Chancellor for Research)
- Hojatoleslam Haj Mofid Fayazi (Vice-Chancellor for Student and Cultural Affairs)
- Dr. Sharryar Tamandani (Dean of the Faculty of Technical Engineering)
- Dr. Reza Izadi (Dean of the Faculty of Economics and Administrative Sciences)

== The Faculty of Technical Engineering ==
The Faculty of Technical Engineering was established in 2006 with the purpose of training manpower in technical and engineering fields namely architecture, computer science, electronics, civil engineering. The faculty offers 32 educational programs at A.D., B.Sc. (continuous and non-continuous) and M.Sc. levels.

The Lab Complex consists of nine divisions including Physics & Circuit, Introductory Digital, Advanced Digital, Introductory Electronics, Advanced Electronics, Industrial Automation and Natural Resources plus seven workshops including Electronics, Machinery, Aerial Distribution Network, Soil Mechanics, Construction Materials & Concrete, Welding & Turning, and Wood Working.

In addition to the aforementioned facilities, the faculty sends students who take practical courses to historical places and sites, museums (for students of architecture), electric power plants and large industrial companies (for students of electronic engineering) and large-scale construction projects (for students of civil engineering) in order to help them supplement their theoretical knowledge with practical experiences.

== The Faculty of Economics and Administrative Sciences ==
The Faculty of Economics and Administrative Sciences was established in 2007 and offers 18 fields of study at M.A., B.A (continuous and non-continuous), and A.D. levels.

== The Faculty of Natural Resources ==
The Faculty of Natural Resources was established in September, 2009 following a license granted by the MSRT's Bureau of Higher Education Development Council. The faculty houses three major fields in A.D. and M.Sc. levels.

== Educational programs ==
- Economic Sciences (M.A)
- Private Law (M.A.)
- Jurisprudence and Private Law (M.A.)
- Jurisprudence and Criminal Law (M.A.)
- Accounting (M.A.)
- English Language Teaching (ELT) (M.A.)
- Industrial Management - Financial (M.A.)
- Electronics Engineering – Power Systems (M.Sc.)
- Electronics Engineering – Integrated Circuits (M.Sc.)
- Electronics Engineering – Power Electronics and Electric Machines (M.Sc.)
- Civil Engineering – Structure (M.Sc.)
- Architectural Engineering (M.Sc.)
- Computer Engineering – Software (M.Sc.)

- Public Law (B.A.)
- Accounting (B.A.)
- Governmental Accounting (B.A.)
- Tax Accounting (B.A.)
- Psychology (B.A.; all branches)
- Economic Sciences – Commercial Economics (B.A.)
- Industrial Engineering (B.Sc.)
- English Translation (B.A.)
- Electronics Engineering (B.Sc.)
- Natural Resources Engineering – Environment (B.Sc.)
- Natural Resources Engineering – Fisheries (Aquaculture; Fish Nutrition) (B.Sc.)
- Natural Resources Engineering – Forestry (B.Sc.)
- Industrial Engineering (B.Sc.)
- Computer Engineering – Software (B.Sc.)
- Computer Sciences – Information Technology (IT) (B.Sc.)
- Architectural Engineering (B.Sc.)
- Biomedical Engineering – Bioelectric (B.Sc.)
- Mechanical Engineering – (B.Sc.)
- Energy Engineering (B.Sc.)
- Information Technology Engineering (B.Sc.)

- Technical Electronics (A.D.)
- Civil Technician Engineering (A.D.)
- Architectural Drafting (A.D.)
- Commercial Accounting – Accounting Technician (A.D.)
- Computer Engineering - Software (A.D.)
- Technical Electronics (A.D.)
- Architecture (A.D.)
- Accounting (A.D.)
- Civil Technician Engineering (A.D.)

- Information & Communication Technology (ICT) (B.Sc.; discontinuous)
- Engineering Technology (Electrical Engineering; Transmission & Distribution Networks) (B.Sc.; discontinuous)
- Control & Instrumentation Engineering (B.Sc.; discontinuous)
- Power Electrical Engineering (B.Sc.; discontinuous)
- Architectural Technology Engineering (B.Sc.; discontinuous)
- Civil Engineering Technology (B.Sc.; discontinuous)
- Scientific & Applied Accounting (B.A.; discontinuous)
- Electronics Engineering Technology (B.Sc.; discontinuous)
- Computer Technology Engineering - Hardware (B.Sc.; discontinuous)
- Computer Technology Engineering - Software (B.Sc.; discontinuous)
- Executive Civil Engineering (B.Sc.; discontinuous).

== Admission procedure ==
In line with the policy of the Iranian government to remove University Entrance Examination (Konkoor) and facilitate students' access to the academic environment, the university has set up a procedure to enroll students without exams in fields which are announced every year in the website of the university. As for other fields of study, the university recruits applicants through the National Entrance Exam which is administered by the National Organization for Educational Testing affiliated to Iran's Ministry of Science, Research and Technology.

== Old campus ==
The university main campus includes a five-storey building (Faculty of Economics and Administrative Sciences), a two-storey building (Faculty of Technical Engineering), a four-storey building (education space), a two-storey building (education space), a two-storey building (headquarters and chemistry lab), a two-storey library, an internet site with 90 computer sets and two dining halls for boys and girls.

The equipment in the old campus was transferred to the new campus in the second semester of the 2011–2012 academic year. The only students who use the old campus are the students of architecture who attend their workshops (atelier) in the two-storey building of the old faculty of technical engineering and the boys' dining hall used now as the workroom. The university old kitchen is still in the same site as it was. The construction of the main campus of the university started in 2006. It covers a land area of 60000 square meters, which is located in Sheikh Fazlollah Nouri Street in the beginning of the Nour-Chamestan road. The main campus was inaugurated in the first semester of the 2011–2012 academic year, after which all the facilities were moved to this place.

== New campus and master plan ==
The plan to construct the Main Campus of the university, spanning a land property of 6000 square meters in the vicinity of Izlamic Azad University of Nour and located in the beginning of Nour-Chamestan Road, was launched in 2006. The plan outlined a multi-phase project, the first phase of which was completed after five years of continuous efforts at the end of the first semester of the 2011–2012 academic year. The flooring and paving of the Main Campus were finished in early 2013 and the gymnasium, architecture atelier and main entrance of the university are under construction. The Main Campus consists of the central building (faculties, administrative offices and classes), dining hall for boys and girls, central library, study hall, lab building, amphitheater to hold conferences, internet site with 90 computer sets, language lab and prayer halls for men and women.

== Student Counseling Center ==
The Student Counseling Center of the university was established in the winter of 2011 under the auspices of the Vice-Chancellery for Student and Cultural Affairs. The center offers counseling, psychological and mental health services to the students and university staff. The activities of the center are classified into two categories:

- counseling and treatment, offering counseling services to the clients in person
- mental health, including publishing brochures, CDs, and booklets, and holding educational workshops and seminars

== Technology and Internet access ==
Technological services offered by the university include the Student and Professor Portal (used for internet-based unit-credit selection, getting access to the scores portal, printouts of student cards for examination entry, online payments, teacher evaluation) and the Online Meal Booking Automation System (able to process the multi-functional electronic cards of the students). The university has been awarded the 'e-NAMAD' i.e. the Electronic Trust Mark, by the Electronic Trade Promotion Center. The Administrative Automation System used for paperless correspondence has been active since 2009 to undertake all the in-house and off-campus academic correspondence. The high-speed wireless internet is available to all the students and professors throughout the campus and rooms.

The website of the university offers facilities like access to the internet systems for unit-credit selection, meal booking, registration for competitions and conferences, appointments for counseling and university news and updates.

== Gallery ==
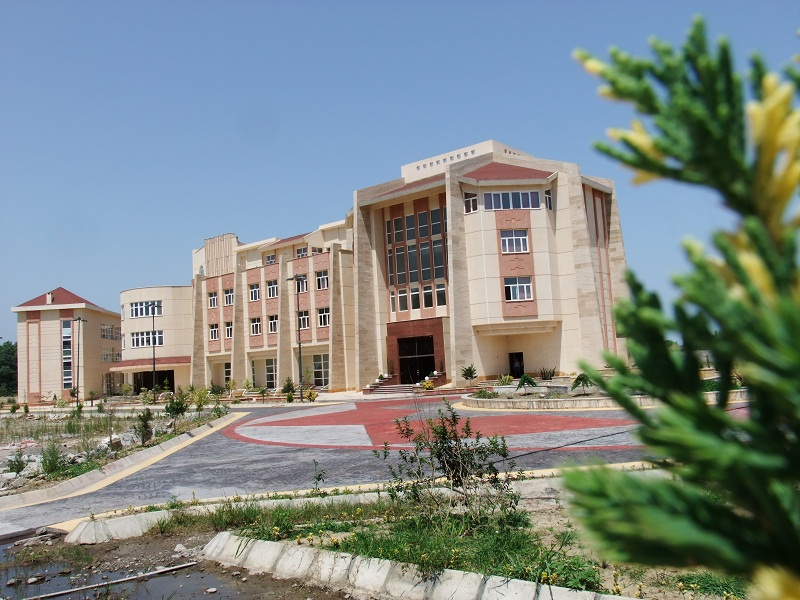

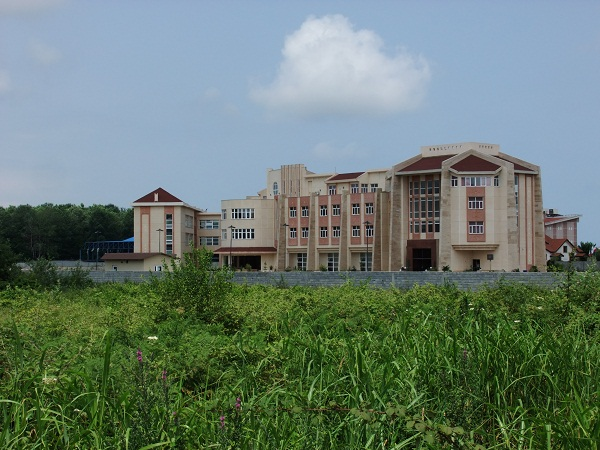

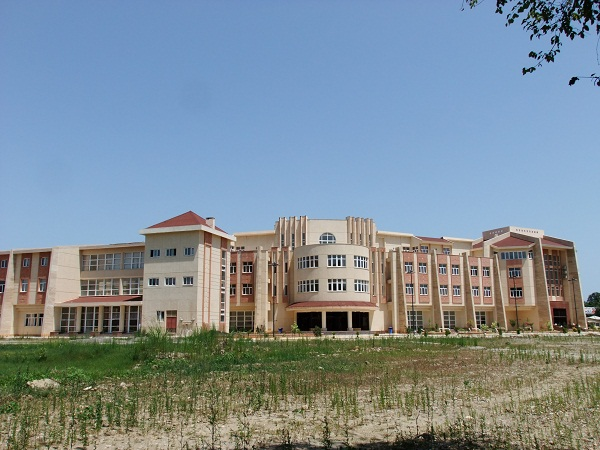

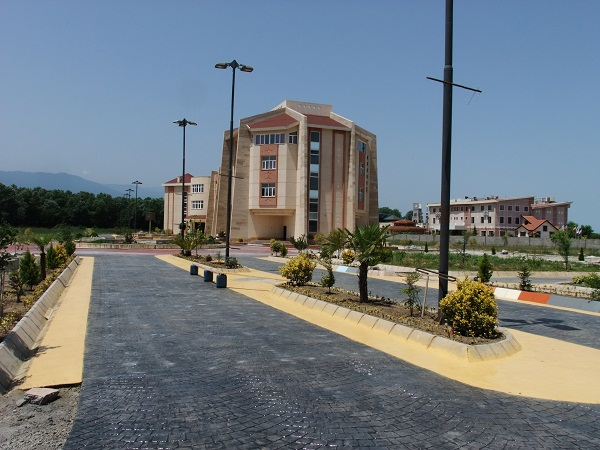

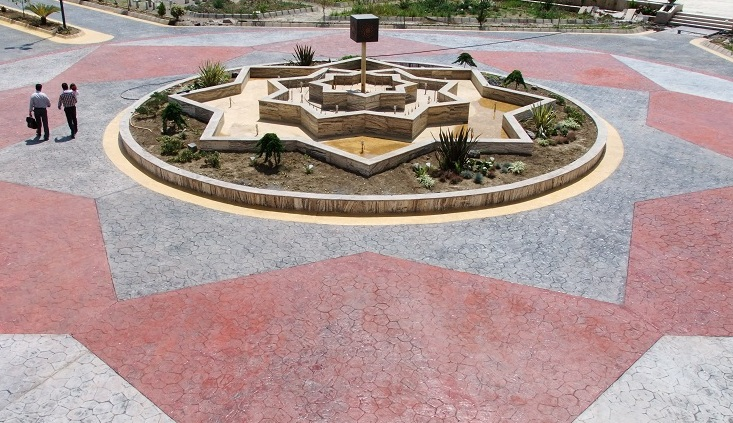

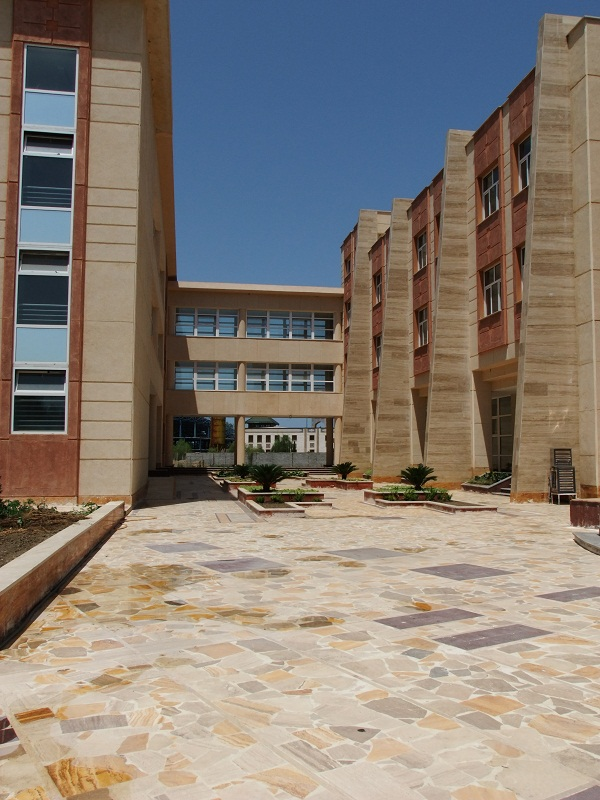

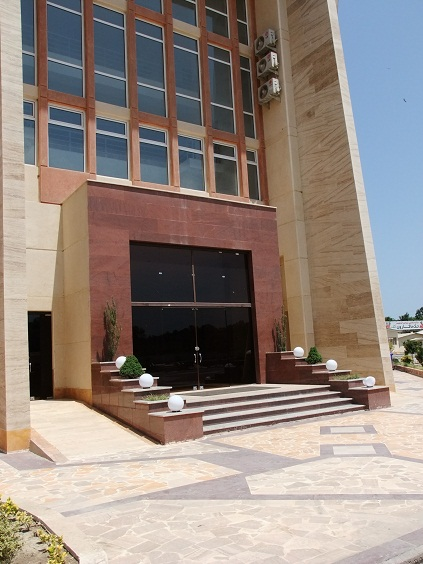
