= Sheykh Fazlolah-e Nuri Rural District =

Rural district in Mazandaran province, Iran

Sheykh Fazlolah-e Nuri Rural District Persian: دهستان شيخ فضل اله نورئ
- Rural District
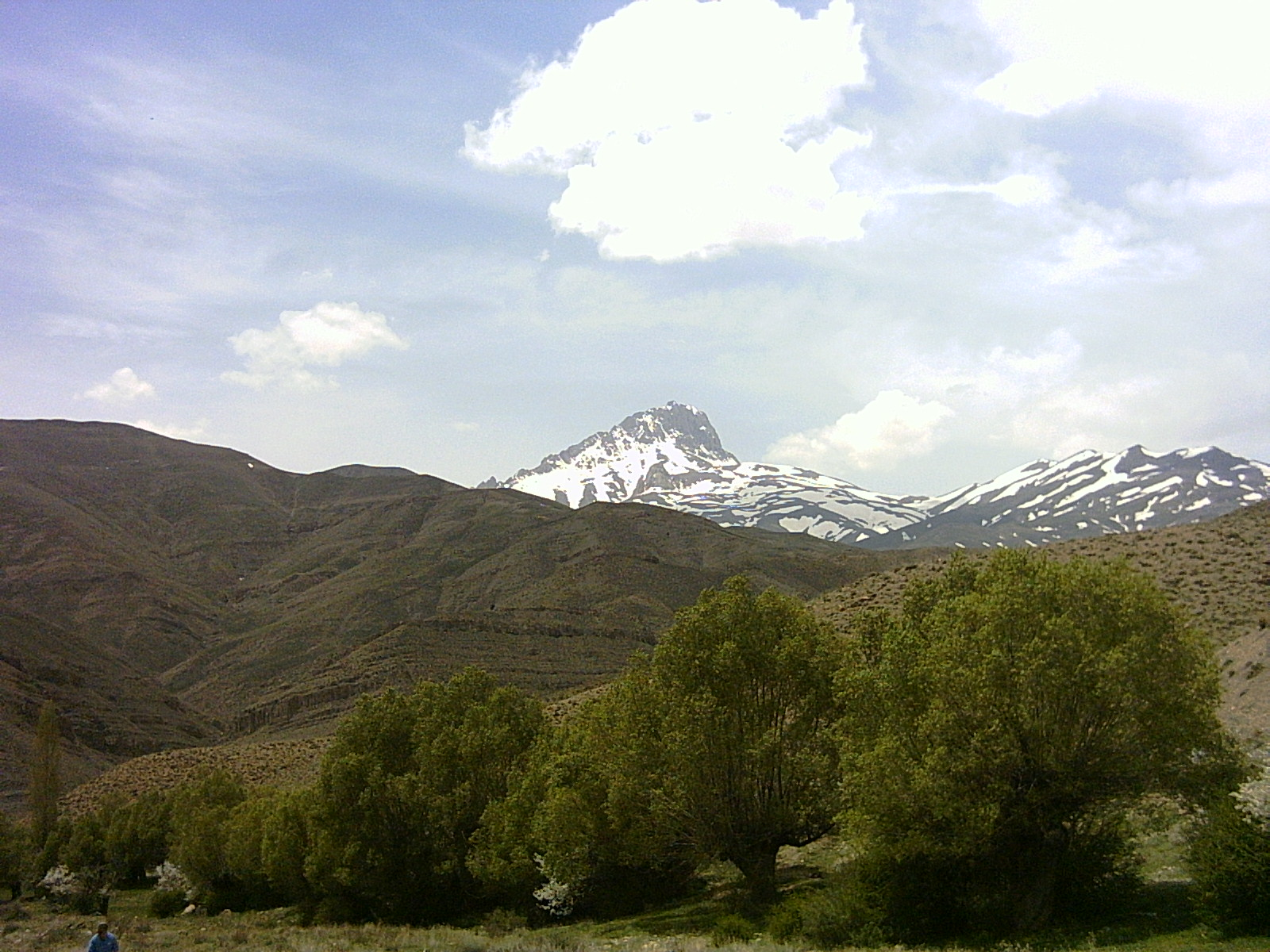
- Azadkuh peak in Sheykh Fazlolah-e Nuri Rural District

- Location within Iran
- Coordinates: 36°10′N 51°48′E
- Country: Iran
- Province: Mazandaran
- County: Nur
- District: Baladeh
- Established: 1987
- Capital: Baladeh

Population (2016)
  - Total: 3,231
- Time zone: UTC+3:30 (IRST)

Sheykh Fazlolah-e Nuri Rural District (Persian: دهستان شيخ فضل اله نورئ) is in Baladeh District of Nur County, Mazandaran province, Iran. It is administered from the city of Baladeh.

== Demographics ==
=== Population ===
At the time of the 2006 National Census, the rural district's population was 2,114 in 667 households. There were 2,327 inhabitants in 868 households at the following census of 2011. The 2016 census measured the population of the rural district as 3,231 in 1,195 households. The most populous of its 32 villages was Varazan, with 506 people.

=== Other villages in the rural district ===
- Betaher Kola
- Bordun
- Chel
- Mazid
- Yal Rud
- Yush
