= Baladeh District =

District in Mazandaran province, Iran

Baladeh District Persian: بخش بلده
- District
- Location within Iran
- Coordinates: 36°10′N 51°49′E
- Country: Iran
- Province: Mazandaran
- County: Nur
- Capital: Baladeh

Population (2016)
  - Total: 7,630
- Time zone: UTC+3:30 (IRST)

Baladeh District (Persian: بخش بلده) is in Nur County, Mazandaran province, Iran. Its capital is the city of Baladeh.

== Demographics ==
=== Population ===
At the time of the 2006 National Census, the district's population was 6,594 in 2,140 households. The following census in 2011 counted 5,739 people in 2,144 households. The 2016 census measured the population of the district as 7,630 inhabitants in 2,946 households.

=== Administrative divisions ===
Baladeh District Population
Administrative Divisions	2006	2011	2016
Owzrud RD	1,811	1,400	2,452
Sheykh Fazlolah-e Nuri RD	2,114	2,327	3,231
Tatarestaq RD	1,535	975	977
Baladeh (city)	1,134	1,037	970
Total	6,594	5,739	7,630
RD = Rural District
