= Khastakhumar and Bibinagar =

Afghan folktale

Khastakhumār and Bībīnagār or Xasteh Xomār is an Afghan folktale. Both titles refer to tales about a poor maiden who marries a youth in snakeskin, loses him due to her breaking his trust, and goes after him at his mother's home, where she is forced to perform hard tasks for her.

The tale belongs to the international cycle of the Animal as Bridegroom or The Search for the Lost Husband, wherein a human princess marries a supernatural husband, loses him, and goes on a quest to find him. It is also distantly related to the Graeco-Roman myth of Cupid and Psyche, in that the heroine is forced to perform difficult tasks for a witch or her mother-in-law. According to scholarship, other variants are known in Afghanistan.

== Summary ==
=== First version ===
A version of the tale, titled Khastakhumār and Bībīnagār, was collected by professor Hafizullah Baghban in 1967, from a fifty-year-old farmer named Yar Muhammad. In this tale, an old kharkash ('thorn-seller', 'thorn-gatherer'), while gathering thorn bushes to sell, meets a black snake who asks for the man's youngest daughter's hand in marriage. He marries the maiden as a snake, but takes off his snake skin (his jild, a cover or disguise) and appears as a man in their bridal bed. The wife's two stepsisters, seeing the man and becoming jealous, convince her to ask about burning his jild skin. He questions his wife's interest in the matter, but answers her: it can be burned with garlic and onion skins. The stepsisters burn the jild, the man becomes a green pigeon and tells his wife she must wear down seven pairs of iron clothes, seven pairs of iron shoes and seven canes, all the way to the west, then she'll find him, and vanishes.

She begins her wanderings, and passes by a caravan of camels, a flock of sheep, a herd of cows, and a herd of donkeys - all belonging to her husband Khastakhumar. She arrives at a spring and asks for a drink of water, but a woman (concubine) says she is in a hurry and refuses her plight. Bibinagar curses the water the other is carrying to become pus and blood, which she gives to her master. The third time, the servant returns to fetch water, gives it to Bibinagar, and returns to her master. When the concubine pours down the water on her master's hands, a ring drops out of the jug that the master recognizes as Bibinagar's. Khastakhumar takes her in as a servant in his mother's house. His mother tries to get rid of her, by setting her to go to her sister to ask for khamīrturūsh (a sourdough ball used to prepare bread).

Before she goes, Khastakhumar intercepts her and teaches her to reach his aunt: she is to compliment a river of pus by saying it contains butter; compliment a river of blood by saying it contains juice; compliment a crooked tree; open his aunt's shut gate and shut her open one; and give the correct fodder to animals (bone to a dog and a straw to a donkey). The woman visits the witch, gets the khamirturush and escapes. The aunt commands the dog, the donkey, the gates, the tree and the rivers of pus and blood to stop Bibinagar, but the human woman leaves unscathed.

Next, Khastakhumar's mother forces Bibinagar to hold candles during Khastakhumar's marriage to his aunt's daughter: Khastakhumar's mother wraps cotton around her fingers and lights them up. Suffering their burning, Bibinagar cries out to Khastakhumar her fingers are burning, and he, in return, says his heart and soul are the ones that are burning. After his wedding to his cousin, Khastakhumar asks Bibinagar to boil water. His new wife takes the boiled water to the tushnuk (a sort of washroom), pours it on her head and dies.

The couple prepares to escape from Khastakhumar's family and takes with them a dozen needles, water in a sheepskin, a dozen juwāldūz (large sewing needles), salt and glass. As his family pursues them, the couple try to hinder the chase by throwing objects behind them: first the juwaldaz (which spread into large needles), then the needles, the salt, the glass (which turns the ground into glass) and finally the water to create a river between them. At the other side of the river, Khastakhumar's family asks how they crossed the stream. Bibinagar explains she crossed by pocketing some rocks and jumping. His family follows the false instructions and sink to the bottom. The couple wait until black blood foams at the river surface to confirm his family's demise. After they ascertain their victory, they go back to his father-in-law's house and remarry.

=== Second version ===
A second version of the tale was collected by American folklorist Margaret Mills from a woman named MZ, in the Dari language, titled Xasteh Xomār. In her version, a poor, old thorn-gatherer, while in the fields, lifts a stone and finds a hidden cache of flour. Thinking it is a divine blessing, he takes some and brings it home. When he returns, he sees a snake on top of the trapdoor, who explains it is the owner of the flour and demands one of the man's daughters in return. He tells the situation to his three daughters, but only the youngest accepts to be delivered to the snake.

She sits on a camel to be taken to her snake husband. A handsome man greets her and takes her to an underground palace. He explains that he wears a snake skin, but is otherwise human. (Note: According to Mills, the female teller believed him to be a peri-born human.) He gives her free rein on all his properties.

Some time later, her sisters want to visit her, and her elder gets curious about the snake skin. She prompts the youngest to ask her husband about it later that night. She does and is reproached by her husband, warning her that if the skin is burnt, it may lead to disgrace for both of them. He says her question is foolish, but answers that it can be burnt with onion and garlic skins.

The girl naïvely tells her sisters about it the next time they visit. Her sisters heat up the oven and throw the snakeskin inside, just as Xasteh Xomar appears to try to stop them. As the skin burns, the grand palace and everything within it vanish, leaving only the girls, and a betrayed Xasteh Xomar. He tells his wife that, if she ever wants to see him again, she must head westwards, wearing seven pairs of iron shoes and seven iron canes, but warns her that his own family is entirely made of divs that may devour her.

Later, the girl goes after him with the needed garments. She passes by a herd of camels, a herd of cows, a herd of sheep and a herd of goats - all the bride price of Bibi Negar. She finally stops by her husband's place. While she rests, she sees a servant girl come out of the building to fetch some water. She begs the girl to drink some, but the servant refuses and tells her the water is for her master. The girl curses the water to become blood, then pus, and by the third time the servant goes to the fountain, she finally gives the girl a drink of water. She discreetly lets her ring inside the jug. When the servant takes the jug to Xasteh Xomar, he recognizes the ring and brings the girl home.

Xasteh Xomar is happy to see his human wife, but reminds her of the warning about his family. So he turns her into a needle to hide her presence from the divs. However, his div mother notices the human smell on him and wants her son to reveal the human he is hiding. Xasteh Xomar makes her promise not to harm his human wife (who he passes off as a servant). The div mother still forces her to do chores for them: to sweep the floor and sprinkle water over it; to take a black mat and wash it white, and to wash it back to black. Xasteh Xomār invokes magic help in the name of prophet Solomon and helps his wife in her tasks.

Thirdly, the div mother sends the girl to go to her sister's house and bring a comb, a mirror and scissors. Xasteh Xomar advises her to compliment everything on its way, no matter if ugly or repulsive; to give the correct food for the dog and the camel; to get the objects and run away as fast as she can. She does as instructed and returns to the div mother's house with the requested items.

Finally, the div mother prepares the wedding of Xasteh Xomar with his cousin, Bibi Negar. (Note: In this tale, Bibi Negar is the name of the false bride.) His div mother wraps cotton around the human girl's fingers, butters them with ghee, lights the improvised candles and forces her to illuminate the wedding procession. Xasteh Xomar's human wife cries out that her fingers are burning, but Xasteh Xomar himself is also suffering with his mother's ploy. When the ceremony ends, Xasteh Xomar insists that the servant girl sleeps by the door, in case he and his new wife need something.

That night, Xasteh Xomar heats up a cauldron of cooking fat, takes his new wife and dumps her inside the cooking pot. He at last awakens his human wife, takes some objects from the house and both escape.

The next morning, his div family notices that he has not awakened yet, nor has his bride. They notice that the bride Bibi Negar has been cooked like a meal, and decide to go after the runaway couple. His aunt and mother follow them in a cloud of smoke. Xasteh Xomar notices their approach and throws objects to deter them, invoking the name of prophet Solomon to work the magic: the needles create a field of needles to prickle their feet; the salt to cripple them. The last object creates a sea (derīyā in the original text, meaning 'gulfs', 'wide lakes' and 'seas' in the Herati dialect). Xasteh Xomar deceives his family by saying that he crossed the lake by carrying a mountain on each shoulder and a millstone around their neck. His relatives repeat the action and sink to the bottom of the lake, never to return.

Xasteh Xomar and his human wife return to their palace.

== Analysis ==
=== Tale type ===
Scholars relate the story to the ancient Graeco-Roman myth of Cupid and Psyche and classify both versions as type ATU 425, "The Search for the Lost Husband", in the Aarne-Thompson-Uther Index. In this type, the heroine marries an enchanted animal who is a prince in disguise, loses him due to her own actions, and goes on an arduous quest to get him back. In both Afghan tales, the heroine must wear down seven pairs of iron shoes and walk with an iron cane.

In his monograph about Cupid and Psyche (AaTh 425) and related types, Swedish scholar Jan-Öjvind Swahn believed that his type A (Cupid and Psyche) (Note: For clarification, Swahn, in his system, classified type 425A as the "oldest". In Stith Thompson's system, Swahn's typing is indexed as type AaTh 425B.) appeared to be "the main tale type of Aa 425" in Persia and in India.

German scholar Ulrich Marzolph listed the tale Margaret Mills collected as an Afghan parallel to the Iranian tales he classified under type AaTh 425B, Der Tierbräutigam: Die böse Zauberin ("The Animal Bridegroom: The Evil Sorceress"). In that regard, in an article in Enzyklopädie des Märchens, Mills stated that Marzolph's Index can be used to classify the Dari-language Afghan tales.

=== Motifs ===
Margaret Mills translates Bibī Negār as "Lady Beauty" or "Lady Idol". Also, according to Mills, the name of the enchanted husband, Xasteh Xomār, is a complex linguistic pun: mār ('snake'), xasteh xormā ('date seed'), xasteh ('weary') and xomār ('languid (glance)').

The heroine and her supernatural husband escape in a Magic Flight sequence, that is, the characters either throw magic objects to delay their pursuers, or change into other forms to deceive them. Although this episode is more characteristic of tale type ATU 313, "The Magic Flight", some variants of type ATU 425B also show it as a closing episode. German literary critic Walter Puchner argues that the motif attached itself to type 425B, as a Wandermotiv ("Wandering motif").

==== Identification by ring ====
These tales contain the motif of dropping a ring for identification in a glass of water (motif H94.4), instead of into a glass of wine, as it is described in Stith Thompson's Motif-Index of Folk-Literature. Scholars point out that this substitution occurs in Afghan and Muslim variants due to religious influence of Islam. According to Swedish scholar Jan Öjvind Swahn's study on Animal as Bridegroom tales, a characteristic motif that occurs in the "Indo-Persian" area is the heroine using a ring to signal her arrival to her husband, when she finds his location.

== Variants ==
=== Afghanistan ===
Mills states that Xasteh Xomār is a "very popular Afghan variant" of tale type ATU 425. In a previous article, she stated to have collected 11 performances (ca. 1974–1976). In a later work, she noted to have recorded 14 performances in Herat. In 13 of them, the magical bridegroom appears as a snake. Some versions may be translated as Khasta Khamarah, Khasta Khamorah or The Snake Man and the Human Brick.

==== The daughter of the heath vendor ====
In a tale from Parwan Province with the title The daughter of the heath vendor, published by Siddiq Sultani, a poor heath vendor has three daughters. One day, he finds some bundles of heath in a moor and brings it home to sell. After two days more, he goes to the moors and sees a snake on the heath bundles. The reptile tells the man to obey him, for he has come to ask for the hand of the man's youngest daughter in marriage. He goes home and tells his youngest daughter the news, and the girl consents to be the snake's bride. The man then returns to the moors to report the news to the snake, and the latter, elated at the good news, gives the man some gold coins for him to buy some dresses for his daughter, and tells him to bring her near a river on Thursday. It happens so: the girl is brought to the river in finer dresses to meet her fiancé, and a retinue of snakes, with their master, come out of the water to take the girl to their new home.

Time passes; the heath vendor fears for his daughter, and decides to search for her. On the way, he overhears the conversation between two mina birds about how to arrive at his destination: by moving a stone near a cave, squeezing through a window and reaching a garden. The vendor does as the birds instructed and goes to his daughter's home: the girl is alive, and could not be happier, for her husband is a snake prince who takes off the snakeskin. The girl then tells her father to bring her elder sisters for a visit, and gives him some gold coins. The next time, the vendor brings his two other daughters and a cousin. Seeing the girl's happiness, the cousin, driven by envy, asks her details about her life with the snake. The girl, Mehre Negar, answers that he is the prince of snakes whom they address as Sabzina Khumar (for the colour of his garb), but is otherwise human. Moved by this information, Mehre Negar's cousin convinces her to ask how to destroy his snakeskin and keep him human for good. That same night, Sabzina Khumar comes back to their palace, and is asked the question. In a rage, he slaps Mehre Negar, who cries at her husband's deed. Moved by her tears, Sabzina Khumar then says his snakeskin can be burnt with skins of onions and garlics in an oven. The next day, Mehre Negar tells her family her husband's secret, and, for the remainder of their visit, her sisters and cousin collect onion and garlic peels and prepare the oven. One night, while the couple is asleep, the cousin takes the snakeskin and tosses it in the oven. Sabzina Khumar wakes up, slaps his wife, says she will not see him anymore, turns into a bird and flies away, his palace disappearing with him. Now abandoned in the wilderness, Mehre Negar vows to find him, commissions a pair of iron shoes and an iron cane from a blacksmith, and begins her quest.

At last she arrives near a place where some servants are fetching water for their master. Mehre Negar asks for some water and drops her husband's ring inside it. Back to Sabzina Khumar, he finds the ring and meets with his wife outside the house. The couple reunite: him admonishing her, and her apologizing. Sabzina Khumar also says his mother is "the daughter of a giant", and he has to hide his human wife inside the house: she turns her into a needle first, then into a broom. Sabzina Khumar's mother still smells a human; Sabzina undoes his magic, and shows her to his mother, making the latter pledge not to hurt the former. Eventually, his mother forces Mehre Negar on difficult tasks: first, she has to fill a trough with her tears - Sabzina tells her to fill it with water and pour salt on it; next, she is given a black rug she must wash white with a bar of soap - Sabzina says a prayer to change its colour. Some time later, Sabzina's mother talks to her sister about marrying their children to each other, and the former hatches a plan to get rid of Mehre Negar: she is to take a letter to Sabzina's aunt (with a command to kill her), and ask for a musical box. Before Mehre Negar goes, Sabzina intercepts her, and changes the letter. He also advises her on how to proceed: open a closed door and close an open one, give the correct fodder for animals (bone for a dog and hay for a cow), say a blood stream contains honey and meet his aunt. It happens so: Mehre Negar trades the letter for the musical box, then runs away through the same path. Sabzina's aunt commands the stream, the animals and he door to stop her. During her escape, she accidentally bumps the box against a wall and music begins to come out of it. Sabzina appears to her to silence the box, and accompanies her to his mother's house with the box. The same night, Sabzina Khumar and Mehre Negar plan their escape, and saddle two horses.

The next day, Sabzina Khumar buys needles, a mirror, and two bars of soap, and hides a bottle of water. The wedding happens: after a section of henna painting on the wedding couple, Mehre Negar is made to hold ten burning candles on her fingers and light the wedding procession. All the way, she complains her fingers are burning, while her husband says it is his heart that is. After the wedding, Sabzina Khumar kills his cousin and takes Mehre Negar with him on the horses. The next morning, his aunt and mother find the cousin dead and go after the couple. During the chase, Sabzina Khumar throws behind him the objects to deter them: needles that create a mountain, the mirror that becomes a slippery mountain, the bars of soap another mountain, and the water bottle makes a wide river before their pursuers. Sabzina's aunt and mother try to cross the river and drown. Sabzina Khumar and Mehre Negar return home, he recreates their palace and they live happily.

==== Bibi Nagar and Mirza Ghast Khamar ====
Iranian poet Ahmad Shamlou collected an Afghan tale titled "بی بی نگار و میرزا خسته خمار" ("Bibi Nagar and Mirza Ghast Khamar"), in his work The Book of Alley. In this tale, an old thorn-gatherer lives with a wife and three daughters. One day, he finds a hidden supply of wheat ("گندم" 'gandom', in the original), which he sells to earn money. Returning later to the cache, he finds a black snake that demands the man returns its wheat, or surrenders one of his daughters in marriage to the snake, otherwise it will devour him. The old man returns home and explains the situation to his daughters: the elder two refuse to marry the snake, while the youngest agrees. A camel and a cadre of snakes appears to take the bride to their master, who welcomes his bride to its underground lair: a palace with a room filled with provisions (meat, rice, oil, flour, sugar and sweets), another with garments and a third one with gold and jewels. The snake explains he wears a snakeskin, having fallen in love with her, and gives her his magic ring, which can grant wishes by calling upon King Solomon's name. Back to her sisters, they ask their father to visit their cadette. The elder two, on seeing their cadette's life of luxury and spurred by envy, convince the youngest to ask the snake husband how to destroy the snakeskin, and he answers: with garlic and onion peels. The sisters prepare the oven with the ingredients and burn the man's snakeskin when they are asleep. Mirza wakes up, turns into a dove and perches on a wall to warn his wife: she must wear "seven iron canes, seven pairs of steel shoes" in search for him, and be aware of his mother, his aunt and his aunt's cousin, then vanishes. The palace disappears with him, leaving the three sisters in the wilderness.

The girl goes to a nearby city, sells her jewels and buys the steel shoes. On her journey, she passes by a herd of camels, a herd of cows, a flock of sheep, a herd of goats, each overseen by a shepherd - all belonging to her husband Mirza Ghast Khamar as her gift. She lastly reaches her some black trees, a river of Maqam and a castle nearby, and stops to rest by a wall. A black servant appears to draw some water, and the girl asks for some. The maidservant refuses, since the water is for Mirza, and the girl curses it to become, first, blood, then pus. The servant informs Mirza about the wanderer just outside the palace ("Dirfar Castle"), and goes to give her some water. The human girl drops her husband's ring into the jug, which he recognizes and goes to meet his wife outside. Mirza Ghast Khamar transforms her into a needle, and enters the house, but his mother appears and smells a human's scent. Ghast Khamar tells his mother he will bring another servant to help with his upcoming wedding, if she promises not to eat them. She promises on mother's milk and Ghast Khamar turns the needle into his human wife.

However, his mother plans to renege on her vow, by sending the girl to her sister to be devoured. The next day, the mother asks the girl to sweep the floor and the courtyard for Ghast Khamar's wedding to his cousin Bibi Nagar, but whenever she sweeps, a pile of dirt forms on the floor - Ghast Khamar summons a wind to help her. Next, she orders the human girl to fetch water: the girl uses a bucket, but cannot draw any water - Ghast Khamar summons a cloud to rain on the patio. Thirdly, she is to take a black garment and wash it white in the river - Ghast Khamar chants a spell to change the colours. Fourthly, she is to go to Ghast Khamar's aunt and fetch a comb, a mirror and scissors for the wedding. Ghast Khamar intercepts his wife and advises her on how to proceed: compliment a fountain of blood by saying it is honey; compliment a spring of pus by saying it is oil; compliment a crooked tree; exchange the fodder between two animals (a bush for a camel, a bone for a dog), greet his aunt, ask for the objects; while she retires to sharpen her teeth, his wife is to get the objects and rush back. It happens thus: his human wife leaves unscathed, and his aunt orders her servants to stop her. Lastly, Ghast Khamar's mother marries him to his cousin, places cotton on his human wife's hands and lights them to serve as candles to illuminate the wedding couple. She cries for the burning in her hands, and Ghast Khamar complains that his soul and life are burning. The candles burn his true wife's fingers, which he notices and promises to avenge her. He lets his human wife stay near the door of the couple's room, despite his relatives' protests. After he waits for his family to sleep (since the sleep cycle of demons are for 40 days), he prepares a large pot of oil and roasts his cousin alive, then covers her with a shawl. He escapes from the castle with his human wife with needles, salt and water. The next morning, his mother and aunt go to the couple's room and, upon entering, discover their niece is dead. The duo of demonesses decide to hunt them and devour both, and begin a chase. On the road, Mirza Ghast Khamar spots his female relatives coming after them as two black smokes, admonishes his wife and throws some objects to deter their pursuers: first, the juwaldaz (large needles) to hurt their feet, then the salt to rub their wounds, and finally a bag of water so create a vast sea between the couple and his female relatives, invoking the name of Prophet Solomon each time. On the other side of the sea, the two demonesses ask him how he crossed it, and Mirza tells them he wore some stones on his arms and neck, then walked. They follow his false advice and sink to the bottom. Mirza waits a bit to reassure they are dead. Blood foams at the surface, confirming they are dead, but still Ghast Khamar complains that their latest hardships were his wife's fault for burning his skin. At last, they return to their palace and live their days in peace. In volume 6 of The Book of Alley, Shamlou noted that he later became aware of another version of the tale, collected by Margaret Mills from a source in Herat.

==== Shah Sultan Serpent ====
In an Afghan tale from Herat titled "شاه سلطان مار" ("Shah Sultan Serpent"), a king has three daughters. One day, they are bored, and send for the eunuchs to buy melons of varying ripeness and have them delivered to their father. The king questions the meaning of the fruits, and his minister answers: the melons are an analogy for their marriagebility, the elder's is overripe, the middle one's is ripe, and the youngest's is just right. Thus, the king gives them oranges and lead them to the palace roof, so they can choose husbands by throwing the oranges at their suitors of choice. The elder two throw theirs to the minister's house and the lawyer's house, respectively, while the youngest's falls on the plain. The youngest princess walks to the plain and digs out a hole to protect herself from the weather and wild animals, when suddenly a black snake with a crown, the Snake King or Shah Sultan Serpent, crawls out of the hole. The princess faints at the sight of the animal, but the snake takes off its skin to become a human youth, and comforts her. She wakes up and explains the situation to him. They enter a hole in the ground to a sumptuous palace, and fall in love with each other, becoming husband and wife. A year later, the princess wants to visit her family; Shah Sultan Mar at first denies her, but relents. He then prepares three horses of clouds and winds to take her to her sisters.

The youngest princess reaches a female hammam and meets with her elder sisters, who marvel at her jewels and garments, feeling jealous of her. After being told of the whole story, they deduce their brother-in-law is a peri, and convince their sister to ask how to destroy the snakeskin. The princess returns and does as her sisters requested, but Shah Sultan Mar slaps her face for her question, admonishes her that the question will destroy their life. Some time later, the girl asks again, and this time she promises she will not burn his snakeskin. On these terms, Shah Sultan Mar reveals how: with peels of garlic and onion. Days pass, and the princess gathers enough peels, take the snakeskin and burns it in a corner of the garden. As soon as she does that, the garden, the palace and everything disappears, leaving the princess alone on the plains where her orange fell. Shah Sultan Mar appears to her in the shape of a dove, admonishes her, and says she can find him again by walking for seven years towards the "qibla of the Earth", wearing iron garments and iron shoes and with seven iron canes until she reaches his lands, then flies away. The girl dons the iron garments and travels through lands and countries for seven years, until she passes by herds of sheep and cattle, which some shepherds say belong to Shah Sultan Mar and Bibi Nagar. The shepherds also mention that Shah Sultan Mar is a peri on his father's side, and the son of a female Barzangi.

The girl reaches the land of Peris and Divs, and sights the castle towers in the distance. While she stops to rest near a tree, a maidservant comes to fetch water for her master Shah Sultan Mar. The princess asks for a drink, which the maidservant denies, and the princess curses the water to become blood. The second time, the princess is denied again and curses to become pus. The third time, Shah Sultan Mar orders the maidservant to fulfill the wanderer's request. The princess takes a sip from the jug and drops her ring inside it, which is brought to her husband Shah Sultan Mar. The youth recognizes the ring and goes outside to meet his human wife. They reunite, but he warns her his family is composed of man-eating barzangis and other bloodthirsty monsters, so he will pass her off as a maidservant. He takes his human wife inside and introduces her to his mother as a girl from a coming caravan who has come to be their servant, and makes his mother promise not to eat her.

Despite this, Shah Sultan Mar's mother begins her tricks to devour her. First, she sends the princess to her sister to ask for some dough, and writes a command on the girl's forehead for his sister to devour her. Shah Sultan Mar wipes the command on his human wife's forehead and writes another, for his aunt to spare her. Next, the girl is forced to wash a black thing white, which Shah Sultan Mar does by uttering the name of Azam, then to wash the white thing black again, which is also done by Shah Sultan Mar. Thirdly, the girl is to sweep and wash the path for his upcoming wedding, which Shah Sultan Mar does by saying a prayer. Just before the wedding ceremony, Shah Sultan Mar asks his wife to fetch some needles, some juwaldaz (giant sewing needles), some salt and a mirror. Later that night, the princess is made to hold candles and dance during Shah Sultan Mar's wedding to his cousin. As the princess dances, she sings some sad verses about how her fingers are burning, and how she has suffered for Shah Sultan Mar, while Shah Sultan Mar says his heart and soul are burning, referring to the princess as "Bibi Nagar". After the ceremony, as they enter the "halja" (an alcove), Shah Sultan Mar puts out the candles in his wife's hands, kills his cousin, and escapes with the princess through the roof. The next day, the barzangi family knocks on the door to the wedding chambers and, suspecting the silence, enter the room and find the dead bride. They blame the human girl they brought in, and gather the tribes to go after them. On the road, Shah Sultan Mar and his wife realize they are being pursued, and throw behind them the items to deter his family: the needles to hurt their feet, the salt to burn their wounds, the juwaldaz to further hurt them, and finally the mirror to create a sea between them and their pursuers. From the other side of the sea, his family asks how they can cross the water, and Shah Sultan Mar convinces them to place some stones on them and wade through. Some of them obey his orders and sink to the bottom of the sea, while others survive. Free at last, Shah Sultan Mar lives in happiness with the princess.

==== Khasta Khamorah (The Human Brick) ====
A poor thorn-gatherer lives with his wife and three daughters. One day, he finds a stash of wheat under a stone and brings it to his family. However, when he returns the next day to fetch some more, a snake appears and questions the man. The man reveals he took the grains, and the snake demands one of the thorn-gatherer's daughter as his wife. The man returns home as asks which will go with the snake: the elder two refuse to marry the snake, save for the youngest. Following the snake's instructions, the thorn-gatherer dresses his cadette and places her on a white camel, when a cadre of snakes on a white she-camel appear to take her to their master. The girl meets her snake bridegroom, who reveals he is a peri named Khasta Khamorah under the snakeskin. She lives in luxury in an underground palace. Some time later, the girl's elder sister pay her a visit and advise her to burn the snakeskin. The girl asks Khasta Khamorah how to burn it, and he slaps her so hard to chastise her for such a question. Still, the girl burns the snakeskin, despite his warnings; Khasta Khamorah tells his wife she will only find him again by wearing seven pair of iron shoes and seven iron clothes, and warns his wife his family is made of devs. With this, he disappears along with the palace and everyhing in it. The girl goes after him in the iron garments and finds him again at his family's house. The devs take her in and force her on hard tasks for her to fail so she can be devoured: first, to sweep straw; then, to wash a black cloth white and another white into black. With her husband's magic powers, she prevails. Thirdly, the girl is ordered to go to the dev-aunt's house and fetch a comb, scissors, and a mirror. Khasta Khamorah intercepts his wife and advises her how to proceed: compliment a river of pus by saying it is yellow oil; compliment a pool of blood by saying it is mulberry syrupy, compliment a crooked tree by saying it is straight, exchange the fodder between two animals (bones for a dog, straw for a camel), and steal the objects when his aunt goes to another room to sharpen her teeth. The girl follows his instructions to the letter, fetches the items and rushes back, and the aunt commands her servants to stop her, but they stay their hand due to the girl's kind words. Finally, Khasta Khamorah is betrothed to his cousin, and his brother-in-law ties some candles to the human girl to illuminate the wedding procession. Khasta Khamorah asks his mother to let their new servant in the wedding chambers at night. It happens thus, and Khasta Khamorah roasts his dev cousin alive in retaliation for burning his human wife, takes some needles, some straw and a cup of water and escapes with his wife. The next morning, the aunt and mother enter the wedding room and find the dev-cousin's charred remains under the chadris, and decide to chase after the couple. On the road, Khasta Khamorah realizes his relatives are chasing after him and throws behind the needles to hurt their feet, the straw to burn their eyes, and the cup of water to create an ocean between them. On the other side of the ocean, his female relatives ask how he crossed the water, and Khasta Khamorah says he put some rocks under his arms and jump in the water. The dev-family falls for his trick, places the rocks and drown in the ocean. Khasta Khamorah and his human wife return to their underground palace and live in peace.

=== Turkmenistan ===
==== Chutdy Chumar ====
Turkologist Karl Reichl published and translated a Turkmen tale titled "Хутды Хумар" ("Chutdy Chumar"). In this tale, a poor wood-seller gathers some firewood to sell, when a snake appears and asks the old man for one of his daughters in marriage. The old man returns home and explains the situation to his three daughters, but only the youngest, named Dschemal, accepts to be the snake's bride. She waits by the door when a camel and two snakes come to take her to her betrothed. She waits in the bedroom for the snake and it comes, takes off its skin and becomes a human youth. The next morning, he reveals his name is Chutdy Chumar, and wears the snakeskin again. Ten days pass, and her family visits Dschemal. She tells her sisters about the snake husband and they suggest she burns the skin so he becomes human for good. The girl decides to follow through the suggestion and burns it. Chutdy Chumar laments the fact, turns into a pigeon and says she can only find him if she wears down a pair of iron shoes and an iron cane, then vanishes. The girl commissions such garments and begins her journey. She passes by a herd of camels, of cows, of sheep and of horses - all belonging to her husband, and with a small fire burning on top of them. The shepherds explain that the animals are burning just as their master has had his snakeskin burnt by his wife.

After walking for quite some time, she stops by a tree to rest and notices her shoes have holes in it. She realizes she must be close. Meanwhile, Chutdy Chumar has been betrothed to his aunt's daughter, who leaves the house to fetch water for them and sees Dschemal. She tells the man there is a girl outside and he takes her in. His mother, a Div-woman, forces Dschemal on some tasks: first, to fetch water using a sieve - Chutdy Chumar says a prayer and fills a jar with water. Next, Dschemal is ordered to fill two sacks with feathers of white doves - Chutdy Chumar advises her to get two tents, go to a desert place, unroll the tents, place the sacks on them and wait. It happens thus, and the girl sees two doves flying down from the sky to give their feathers. Thirdly, she is to bleach a piece of black cloth; Chutdy Chumar tells her to wash the black cloth next to him, and a cloud appears to rain on the felt to whiten it. His Div-mother orders her to restore its black colour: Chutdy Chumar turns it black again for his wife. The Div-mother then sends Dschemal to turn a bag of peas into wheat - Chutdy Chumar casts a spell to turn the contents of the bag into wheat.

After doing each chore, the Div-mother suspects that her son had a hand in helping the human girl, whom he married against her wishes. At last, the Div-mother decides to kill Dschemal by sending her to her sister to get a comb (a trap set to kill the maiden). Her husband advises her how to proceed: compliment a crooked tree and a dirty river, open a closed door and shut an open one, give a horse and a camel their respective food, get the comb and escape; while his aunt is sharpening her teeth, Dschemal is to fetch the comb and escape. She follows the instructions to the letter, steals the comb, and rushes back, Chutdy Chumar's aunt commanding the animals, the doors, the river and the tree to stop her, to no avail. Dschemal returns with the comb just in time for the Div-mother's last trap: the Div-mother prepares Dschemal to be set on fire, while Chutdy Chumar enters the water. The creature dowses the human girl with oil and lights her up, but Chutdy Chumar ties two pigeons in the water, turns into a cloud and rains on Dschemal to save her, without his mother noticing. He also replaces his human wife for his bride and fills some plates with oil, then leaves her there. Chutdy Chumar's cousin cries for her aunt's help as she burns up, but the Div-woman ignores her. Eventually, the cousin burns herself and the house. Dcshemal and Chutdy Chumar escape. His Div-mother notices the bride has been burnt and goes after them, and they change into different things to elude her: a melon and a seller, a windmill and a miller, a sheep and a shepherd. In the last transformation: Chutdy Chumar creates a river, then transforms Dschemal into a rosebush in the middle of the river and himself into a nightingale. His mother cannot cross the river and ceases her pursuit. The pair returns to her father and live happily ever after. Reichl classified the tale as belonging to the cycle of ATU 425A, "Animal as Bridegroom" and ATU 425B, "The Witch's Tasks".

==== Ýylanbaý ====
In a Turkmen tale titled Ýylanbaý, translated to Turkish with the title Yılanbay ("Snake Lord"), an old man has three daughters. One day, he goes to collect firewood and a snake appears to him, demanding one of the man's daughters as its bride, lest the snake devours him. The man promises to ask his daughters about it and goes back home. He explains the situation to his daughters; the elder two refuse to marry the snake and would rather it devours their father; the cadette offers herself to save her father. The man returns to the snake and says his cadette agrees to marry it. The snake says that wind will blow, then heavy rain, but they should not be afraid; soon, a cadre of snake will appear, then a horse carrying silken clothes for the bride. The following morning, it happens as the snake describes, with wind and rain, then come the snakes and the horse. The old man places his daughter on the horse, which takes her to a palace. Inside the palace, a handsome youth appears to her in white cap, black boots and red clothes. One day, the girl's relatives come for a visit and ask her how she can live with a snake. The girl reveals he is a human person, so the elder sisters convince her to ask him how to burn the snakeskin. The youth reveals it: with onion peels. His wife tells her sisters about it, and they burn the snakeskin at night. Ýylanbaý wakes up, finds the burnt snakeskin, and admonishes his wife that her sisters did it out of jealousy, but if she wants to find him again, she has to wear down iron shoes and an iron cane, turns into a blue dove and flies away.

The girl returns home to mourn for her disappeared husband at her father's house. Her father learns about what his elder daughters did it and expels them from his house. The girl decides to look for her husband, dons the iron apparel and goes in search of him. She passes by a herd of camels, then a herd of sheep, a herd of cattle, and a herd of chicken and geese - all belonging to her husband Ýylanbaý, as she learns. Finally, she asks the chicken- and gooseherd the location of Ýylanbaý's house, and the gooseherd directs her towards it. The girl approaches the house and sees a young girl coming to draw water in a jug. She asks for some water, but the servant girl says that it is for Ýylanbaý. The girl curses the water to become blood and pus, and the female servant brings the dirty water to Ýylanbaý, who notices the muddy water and asks the reason for this. The female servant informs that there is a person outside who asked for water. Ýylanbaý orders the servant girl to fulfill the stranger's request. The servant girl does as ordered, and Ýylanbaý's wife drinks some water and drops her ring inside the jug, which is carried to Ýylanbaý. The youth sees the ring and realizes his wife is there, so he goes to meet her and warns that his whole family is made of Devs that can devours her, and he is set to be married to another. Ýylanbaý then blows a spell over his wife, turns her into an apple and pockets it.

He enters the house, and his mother appears, sensing a human scent. Ýylanbaý makes his mother promise not to devour the human and turns his human wife to human form. Ýylanbaý's mother then orders the girl to sweep and wash the courtyard before the wedding. The girl begins to sweep and water the patio, but feels tired and sits to cry. Ýylanbaý appears and helps her by summoning a whirlwind to clean the patio, then a raincloud to wash it. Ýylanbaý's mother is astonished at the girl's success, so she gives her forty sheep entrails for her to wash in the river, but lets loose forty hounds after her, and orders her to wash all forty sheep stomachs without the dogs catching any. The girl is surrounded by the hounds and cannot seem to fulfill the task, when Ýylanbaý appears, learns of the task, then blows a breath to kill the dogs. Thirdly, Ýylanbaý's mother gives the girl a white felt rug for her to wash it black and a black felt rug to wash it white - Ýylanbaý uses a spell to fulfill the task. Defeated, his mother decides to send the girl to a brother to bring back scissors for her to sew a garment for Ýylanbaý. Ýylanbaý intercepts his wife and advises her how to proceed: reach a barren field and say that it is grassy for a grasslands to appear; reach a crooked willow and say that it is straight; reach a straight willow and say that it is crooked; exchange the fodder between two animals (dry grass for a camel, bones for a dog), close an open door and open a closed one, fetch the scissors hanging from the wall and run back. The girl follows Ýylanbaý's instructions to the letter, and meets his uncle; while he goes to another room to sharpen his teeth, the girl steals the scissors and rushes back, with the Dev-uncle commanding the doors, animals and trees to stop her, to no avail.

The girl brings back the scissors, and Ýylanbaý's wedding is prepared between him and his mother's niece. After the wedding, Ýylanbaý and his cousin enter the house, and his human wife is given a candle to light a lamp. At midnight, when the dev-family is asleep, Ýylanbaý blows a magic breath on his cousin to turn her into a thimble, magics seven doves to splash on a basin, and escapes with his wife through the chimney. The following morning, the dev-mother finds her son's door locked from the inside, and listens to the doves splashing in water, believing it is Ýylanbaý taking a bath. She returns later, and again at noon, hears the nonstop splashing, suspects something wrong and knocks down the door. She finds no trace of her son in the house, exits through the chimney and sees two small dots in the distance. Realizing Ýylanbaý fled with the human girl, the dev-family chase after the couple, but they hide in a hole. The dev-family crosses a bridge, do not find Ýylanbaý and the girl, and return home defeated. Ýylanbaý and his human wife return home, and the girl notices her iron shoes are all worn out. Ýylanbaý and his wife live happily and have many children.

=== Literary versions ===
A version of the tale was referenced in the novel On Fragile Waves, by author E. Lily Yu. In the novel, about a family of Afghan refugees, a mother tells the story to her younger daughter. In the tale, a woodcutter finds a snake named Khastehkhomar in his bundle, who makes him a proposal to marry the man's daughter, Bibinegar. They marry and, after the ceremony, Khastehkhomar takes off the snakeskin to become a handsome youth. One day, Bibinegar asks Khastehkhomar how she can destroy his snakeskin, and he tells her: burn it in onion skins and garlic peels, but he warns her against it. Despite his words, Bibinegar and her mother burn it. Khastehkhomar senses the smell of burning, appears to them and tells his wife he will depart to Mount Qaf, where his peri family lives, and, to find him, she will have to wear down seven pairs of iron shoes until she reaches him. He vanishes. Following his instructions, she wanders off and passes by fields, herds of donkeys and wells - all belonging to Khastehkhomar as his bride price for Bibinegar. She reaches Mount Qaf and gives her ring to a servant of her husband, who takes her in. However, he warns her he is betrothed to a demoness, and suggests she works there as a servant to his family. After escaping attempts on her life by his mother and aunt, she is forced to hold candles on the wedding ceremony, by wrapping cotton on her fingers and lighting them up. Bibinegar suffers their burning during the ceremony and bemoans her fate, and Khastehkhomar, also suffering, says his heart is burning. Later, after the ceremony, Bibinegar cries over her fate near his door, when Khastehkhomar appears to her, saying he killed the demoness, and they both flee from the peris.

== See also ==
- The King of Love
- Ulv Kongesøn (Prince Wolf)
- The Golden Root
- The Horse-Devil and the Witch
- Tulisa, the Wood-Cutter's Daughter
- Habrmani (Armenian folk tale)
- Yasmin and the Serpent Prince
- Baemsillang (The Serpent Husband)
- Amewakahiko soshi
