= Mohsen Emadi =

Iranian-Mexican poet

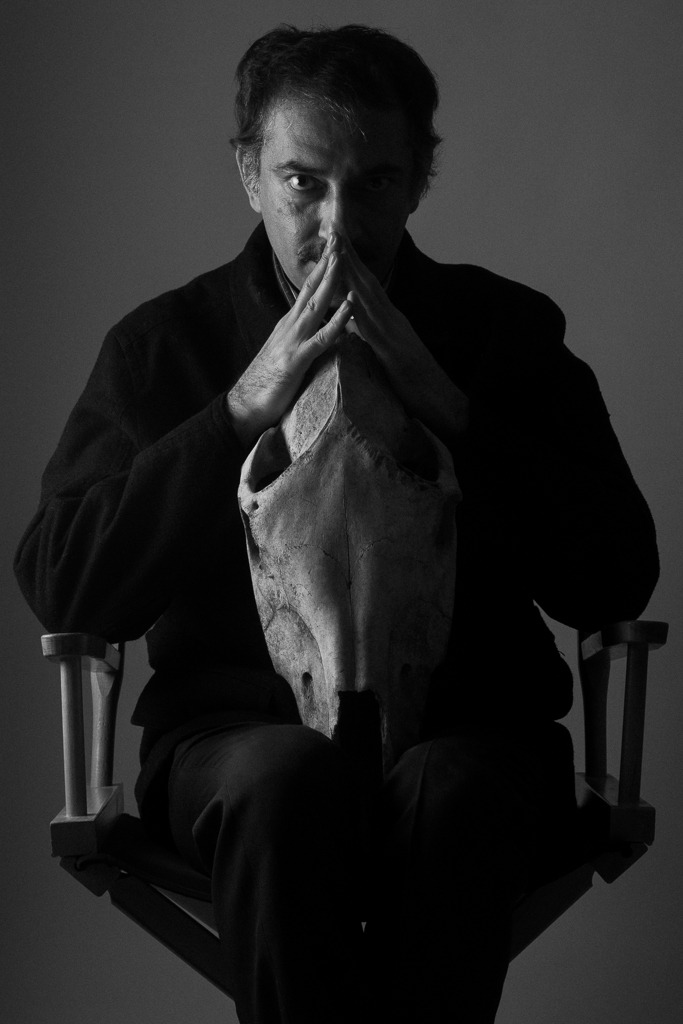
- Born: 29 October 1976; Sari, Iran
- Education: Sharif University of Technology
- Occupations: Poet, Researcher and Translator
- Writing career
- Language: Persian and Spanish
- Movement: Modern literature
- Website: www.mohsenemadi.org

Mohsen Emadi (Persian: محسن عمادی) (born 29 October 1976) is an Iranian-Mexican poet, translator and filmmaker. Born and raised in Iran, he left for Finland in 2009 and has resided primarily in Mexico since 2012, working as a lecturer and researcher in poetry and comparative literature for various institutes in the country.

== Biography ==
Mohsen Emadi was born in Sari, in northern Iran province of Mazandaran. He began writing poems during childhood and appeared in numerous magazines as a young adult.

In 1995, he moved to Tehran to study computer engineering at Sharif University of Technology, where he co-founded multiple student magazines and co-organized two conferences on cinema and philosophy, all confronted by university authorities. Being influenced by Federico García Lorca and the folklore of Mazandaran, he got to know Ahmad Shamlou as his mentor, and was introduced to Generation of '27 of Spain by him. He was an active member of Iranian Student Protests of July 1999, and again 10 years later, 2009 Iranian presidential election protests, the latter forcing him to leave the country. He has since been described as being "exiled" from his home country.

He landed in Finland in 2009 to study digital culture at University of Jyväskylä. Later he lived in Czech Republic and Spain, before moving to Mexico in August 2012, working as a lecturer and researcher in poetry and comparative literature. Emadi holds a PhD in literature from the National Autonomous University of Mexico.

Although he has spent some time in the United States, Emadi reportedly left in early 2017 after then president of the United States, Donald Trump, made Executive Order 13769, which would temporarily ban citizens of various Muslim-majority countries.

== Poetry ==
His first poetry collection, La flor en los renglones (The Flower on the Lines), was published in Spain in 2003.

He has been featured at many international poetry festivals, including the International Poetry Festival of Mexico City, Barcelona Poesia, the International Poetry Festival of Moncayo, Mahalta International Poetry Festival, the International Symposium on Rumi (Turkey, 2007), International Symposium on Nietzsche (Finland), and Association of Writers & Writing Programs. His poetry has been recognized with the 2010 Premio Poesía de Miedo, the IV Antonio Machado Fellowship, an ICORN Fellowship, and the 2015 Poets from Other Worlds honor from the International Poetry Fund.

Emadi's work have been translated into many languages, including Spanish (by Clara Janés), English (by Lyn Coffin), French (by François Roy).

=== Selected publications ===
- La flor en los renglones (Spanish), collected poems, translated by Clara Janés, Lola Editoral, Spain, 2003.
- We did not speak of her eyes (Persian), collected poems, Ghoo Publishing, Iran, 2007.
- Las leyes de la gravedad (Spanish), collected poems, translated by Clara Janés, Olifante Ediciones de poesia, Spain, 2011.
- Visible como el aire, legible como la muerte (Spanish), collected poems, Olifante Ediciones de poesia, Spain, 2012.
- Abismal (Spanish), selected poems, various translators, Casa Refugio Citlaltépetl, Mexico, 2016.
- Standing on Earth (English), translated by Lyn Coffin, Phoneme Media, U.S.A., 2016.
- Suomalainen Iltapäivä (Spanish), collected poems, La Casa del Poeta, Olifante Ediciones de poesia, Spain, 2017.
- Sonata en la ceniza (Spanish), Olifante Ediciones de poesia, Spain, 2022.

== Translation ==
Emadi has published translated world poetry into Persian, mainly from Latin America and Spanish, East European, and Finnish poetry, such as Vladimir Holan, Nichita Stănescu, Vasko Popa, Walt Whitman, Antonio Gamaneda, Juan Gelman, César Vallejo, Luis Cernuda, Pentti Saarikoski, Bo Carpelan, Lêdo Ivo, João Cabral de Melo Neto, Carlos Drummond de Andrade, Jiří Orten, Zbigniew Herbert, Clara Janés, Vítězslav Nezval, and Nathalie Handal. In 2010, he won a Finnish Literature Exchange grant for his translation of the book The Anthology of Finnish Poetry. Sholeh Wolpé and Mohsen Emadi's translations of Walt Whitman’s Song of Myself (Persian: آواز خويشتن) were commissioned by the University of Iowa’s International Program.

He has also translated a few collections into Spanish (published in Mexico), including anthologies on poetry of Armenia, Palestine, and Kurdistan.

== Film Making ==
Following a series of conversation with Antonio Gamoneda and Clara Janés, on a trip to Granada in 2010, Emadi began working on a series of documentaries with themes around poetry, reality and exile. The first of the series is Querido Antonio, a poetic documentary on the influence of the Spanish Civil War on the work of Antonio Gamoneda, which in turn resulted in the publication of De la realidad y la poesía. Tres conversaciones y un poema, (published by Vaso Roto Ediciones, Mexico, 2010).

His other documentaries include La Unica Patria, featuring the last interview with Juan Gelman, and Un Poeta y Su Exilio, on the exile of Luis Cernuda in Mexico.

== Other Activities ==
In academia, Emadi has been a scholar on digital poetry since 2011, teaching on the subject in various institutes in Mexico, like Centro de Cultura Digital. He has also taught courses on Sufism and poetry of cinema. In Mexico, he has judged some international poetry awards of Spanish literature, like Premio Internacional de Poesía Gilberto Owen Estrada.

Emadi is the founder and editor of several Persian websites, including The House of World Poets, a Persian anthology of world poetry with over 50 translators collaborating on introducing world poetry to the Persian language. He also holds the rights for digital publishing of the works of Ahmad Shamlou, including Ketâb-e Kucheh (The Book of Alley), and is the director of his official website.
