= Arbetarnas bildningsförbund =

Swedish labor organization

Arbetarnas bildningsförbund (ABF)
- A version of the ABF logo
- Formation: November 16, 1912; 113 years ago
- Purpose: Workers' Educational Association
- Headquarters: Olof Palmes gata 9; 101 30 Stockholm
- Location: ABF Stockholm
- Coordinates: 59.336032°N 18.061195°E
- Region served: Sweden
- Federal Chair (Förbundsordförande): Helén Pettersson
- Federal Secretary (Förbundssekreterare): Monica Widman-Lundmark
- Affiliations: Swedish labour movement
- Website: ABF.se

Arbetarnas bildningsförbund (ABF; lit. 'Workers' Educational Association') is the educational section of the Swedish labour movement. ABF conducts seminars, classes and study circles on a variety of subjects, including workshops, languages and music.

== History ==
ABF was founded on 16 November 1912, by the Swedish Social Democratic Party and some of the trade unions. Today, the main members of ABF are the Social Democrats and the Left Party.

There are ABF locations in almost every Swedish town and several in the major cities. Its headquarters are on Olof Palmes gata, near Sveavägen street in Stockholm. In Gothenburg, the ABF building is on Olof Palmes Gata, near Järntorget square.

== Moa Award ==
The Moa Award (Swedish: Moa-priset) is an annual literary prize awarded jointly by ABF and the Moa Martinson Society to a person who writes in the spirit of Moa Martinson. The prize has been awarded since 1989.

=== Recipients ===
- 1989 – Mary Andersson
- 1990 – Aino Trosell
- 1991 – Ebba Witt-Brattström
- 1992 – Kerstin Engman
- 1993 – Kerstin Ekman
- 1994 – Kerstin Thorvall
- 1995 – Majgull Axelsson
- 1996 – Sara Lidman
- 1997 – Kristina Lugn
- 1998 – Kjell Johansson
- 1999 – Elsie Johansson
- 2000 – Eva Adolfsson
- 2001 – Frida Andersson, Annika Malmborg, Martin Gerber
- 2002 – Rut Berggren
- 2003 – Anita König
- 2004 – Gerda Antti
- 2005 – Ulrika Knutson
- 2006 – Birgitta Holm
- 2007 – Suzanne Osten, Margareta Garpe, Gunnar Edander
- 2008 – Gunilla Nyroos
- 2009 – Anita Goldman
- 2010 – Anneli Jordahl
- 2011 – Gunilla Thorgren
- 2012 – Inger Alfvén
- 2013 – Susanna Alakoski
- 2014 – Kristina Sandberg
- 2015 – Agneta Pleijel
- 2016 – Yvonne Hirdman
- 2017 – Anna Jörgensdotter
- 2018 – Sara Stridsberg
- 2019 – Maj Wechselmann
- 2020 – Märta Tikkanen
- 2021 – Vibeke Olsson
