= Anneli Jordahl =

Swedish author and journalist (born 1960)

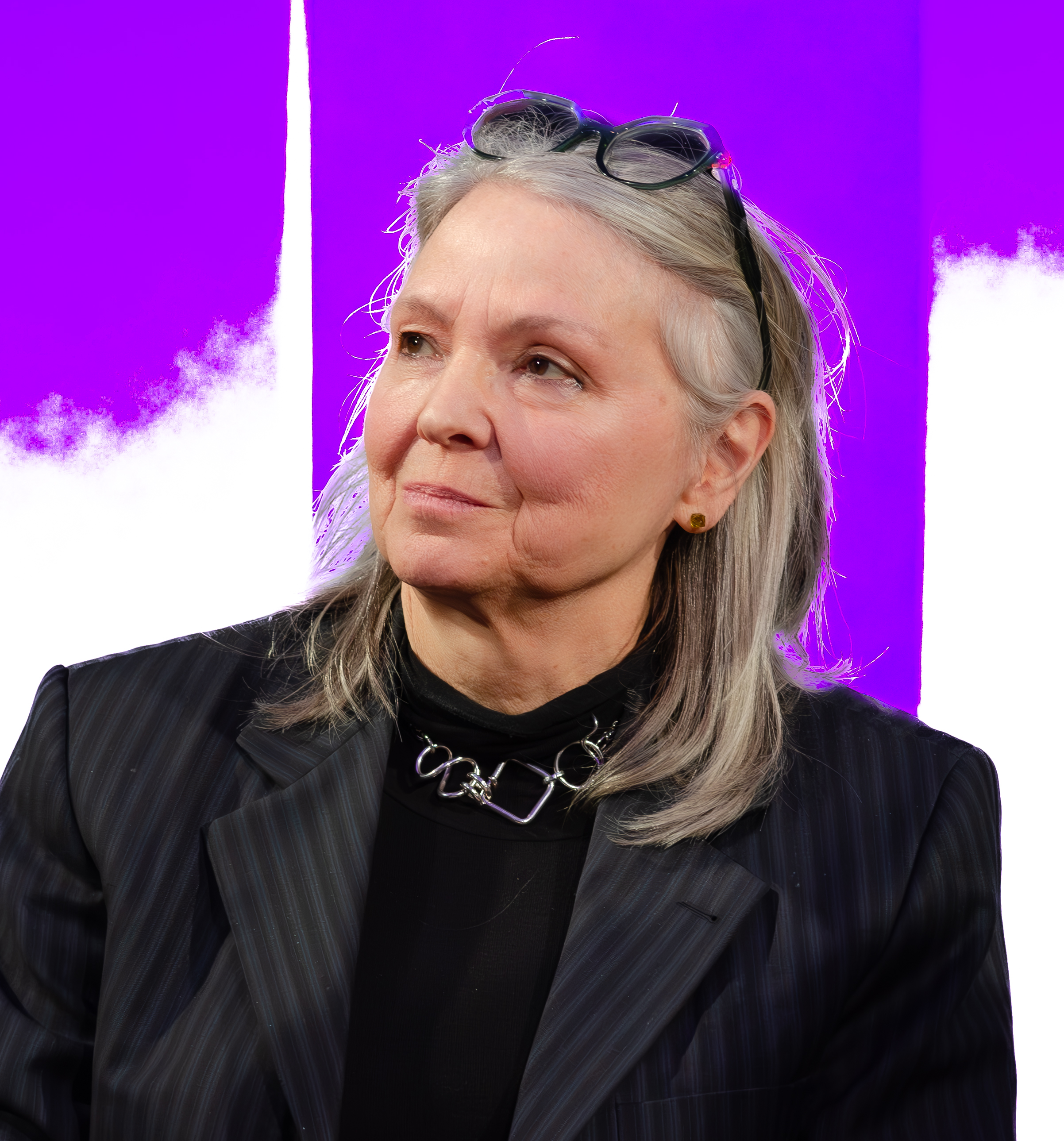
- Jordahl in 2025
- Born: 28 June 1960 (age 66); Östersund, Sweden
- Occupations: Author; journalist; literary critic
- Writing career
- Language: Swedish
- Notable awards: Moa Award (2010)

Anneli Jordahl (born 28 June 1960) is a Swedish author and journalist. She has won accolades including the Moa Award, ABF Literature Prize, and the Ivar Lo Award.

She began her career as a cultural journalist and literary critic, working for publications such as Dagens Nyheter, Sveriges Radio P1, and Aftonbladet. She published her first book in 1999, a travel guidebook about Helsinki. Jordahl came to increased prominence in 2003 after publishing Klass – är du fin nog?, an interview-based work about social class. She made her debut as a novelist in 2009, with Jag skulle vara din hund (om jag bara finge vara i din närhet). Her 2022 novel Björnjägarens döttrar was nominated for the August Prize and the Sveriges Radio Novel Prize.

== Early life and education ==
She was born on 28 June 1960 in Östersund. Her father was an electrician and her mother was a cook who later trained as a nurse. When she was about ten years old, her family moved to Scania; they settled in Alstad. She attended Söderslätt Gymnasium in Trelleborg. She worked as an au pair in New York and then studied literature at the university level.

== Career ==
She worked as a cultural journalist for Dagens Nyheter, Expressen, Sveriges Radio P1, and SVT. She also worked as a literary critic for Aftonbladet and Sydsvenskan. Her first book, a travel guidebook titled Helsingfors: från Kalevala till Snowcrash, was published in 1999. Dagens Nyheter critic Ole Hessler wrote that it departed from the traditional guidebook format, focusing on idiosyncratic local details rather than traditional landmarks like the Uspenski Cathedral.

Jordahl's 2003 book Klass — är du fin nog? brought her to increased prominence. In it, she argues that class is a sociological construction rooted in intangible feeling, accompanied by invisible markers like given names, rather than just a quantity of wealth. She recounts her own "class journey" (klassresa), from a working-class background to a journalist at major Swedish newspapers. In addition to memoir, the work incorporates three interviews representing different class experiences: with her mother Elsvig Svensson (a retired nurse), Ragnar Thoursie (poet and bureaucrat), and David Lagercrantz (author). Jordahl contends that class disparity has intensified in Sweden, which creates significant material and emotional barriers for those seeking social mobility. In 2004, she was awarded the Ludvig Nordström Prize, in recognition of her contributions to cultural journalism. In 2006, she published two books: Var kommer du ifrån?, an essay collection, and Att besegra fru J, a biography about Elsie Johansson.

Her debut novel, Jag skulle vara din hund (om jag bara finge vara i din närhet), was published in 2009. The novel focuses on the relationship between Ellen Key, a feminist writer and education advocate, and Urban von Feilitzen, a literary critic. They exchanged passionate letters for over a decade; the relationship ended after von Feilitzen's wife discovered the nature of their correspondence. Key destroyed all but two of their letters in the aftermath. Jordahl was inspired by the lack of certain historical answers regarding their relationship. She won the Moa Award in 2010. In 2011, she published Augustenbad, en sommar. Her 2014 novel Låt inte den här stan plåga livet ur dig, Mona told the story of a Swedish maid in the 1960s.

In 2016, she published Som hundarna i Lafayette Park, which focused on a 65-year woman from Norrbotten, who becomes interested in the American civil rights movement after her husband's death in an industrial accident. For this novel she won the Vi Magazine's Literature Prize. The same year, she was also awarded the Ivar Lo Award for her exploration of class issues. She was awarded the Hedenvind Plaque in 2017. She won the Eva Bonnier Foundation's 70th Anniversary scholarship for her 2019 essay Orm med två huvuden.

She won the ABF Literature Prize in 2020. In 2022, she published Björnjägarens döttrar, which was inspired by Aleksis Kivi's classic novel Seitsemän veljestä. Björnjägarens döttrar was positively received by literary critic Ingrid Elam for Aftonbladet. It was also nominated for the August Prize and the Sveriges Radio Novel Prize. Her next novel, a piece of historical fiction titled Kallet, was published in 2026. It tells the story of three people living in Jämtland during the Nazi occupation of Norway in 1940, and was praised by Samuel Levander in Dagens Nyheter.

== Selected works ==
=== Non-fiction ===
- Helsingfors : från Kalevala till Snowcrash [Helsinki: from Kalevala to Snowcrash] (in Swedish). Bokförlaget DN. 1999. ISBN 9789175883243.
- Klass – är du fin nog? [Class – are you good enough?]. Bokförlaget Atlas. 2003. ISBN 9789173891196.
- Var kommer du ifrån?: Reportage, intervjuer och essäer [Where are you from?: Reports, interviews, and essays] (in Swedish). Bokförlaget Mormor. 2006. ISBN 9789197584937.
- Att besegra fru J.: en bok om Elsie Johansson [Defeating Mrs. J.: a book about Elsie Johansson]. Bokförlaget Atlas. 2006. ISBN 9789173892124.
- Orm med två huvuden [Two-headed snake]. Norstedts förlag. 2019. ISBN 9789113093932.

=== Novels ===
- Jag skulle vara din hund (om jag bara finge vara i din närhet) [I would be your dog (if only I could be near you)] (in Swedish). Bokförlaget Atlas. 2009. ISBN 9789173893695.
- Augustenbad, en sommar [Augustenbad, one summer] (in Swedish). Norstedts förlag. 2011. ISBN 9789113034928.
- Låt inte den här stan plåga livet ur dig, Mona [Don't let this town torment you, Mona] (in Swedish). Norstedts förlag. 2014. ISBN 9789113052342.
- Som hundarna i Lafayette Park [Like the dogs in Lafayette Park] (in Swedish). Norstedts förlag. 2016. ISBN 9789113074085.
- Björnjägarens döttrar [The Bear Hunter's Daughters] (in Swedish). Norstedts förlag. 2022. ISBN 9789113127118.
- Kallet [The Call] (in Swedish). Norstedts förlag. 2026. ISBN 9789113136455.

=== Articles ===
- "Klassresan neråt har börjat" [The downward class journey has begun]. Dagens Nyheter (in Swedish). 22 February 2007.
- "Färga eller inte färga – det är frågan" [To dye or not to dye – that is the question]. Aftonbladet (in Swedish). 14 June 2019.
