= Vibeke Olsson =

Swedish author and pastor (born 1958)

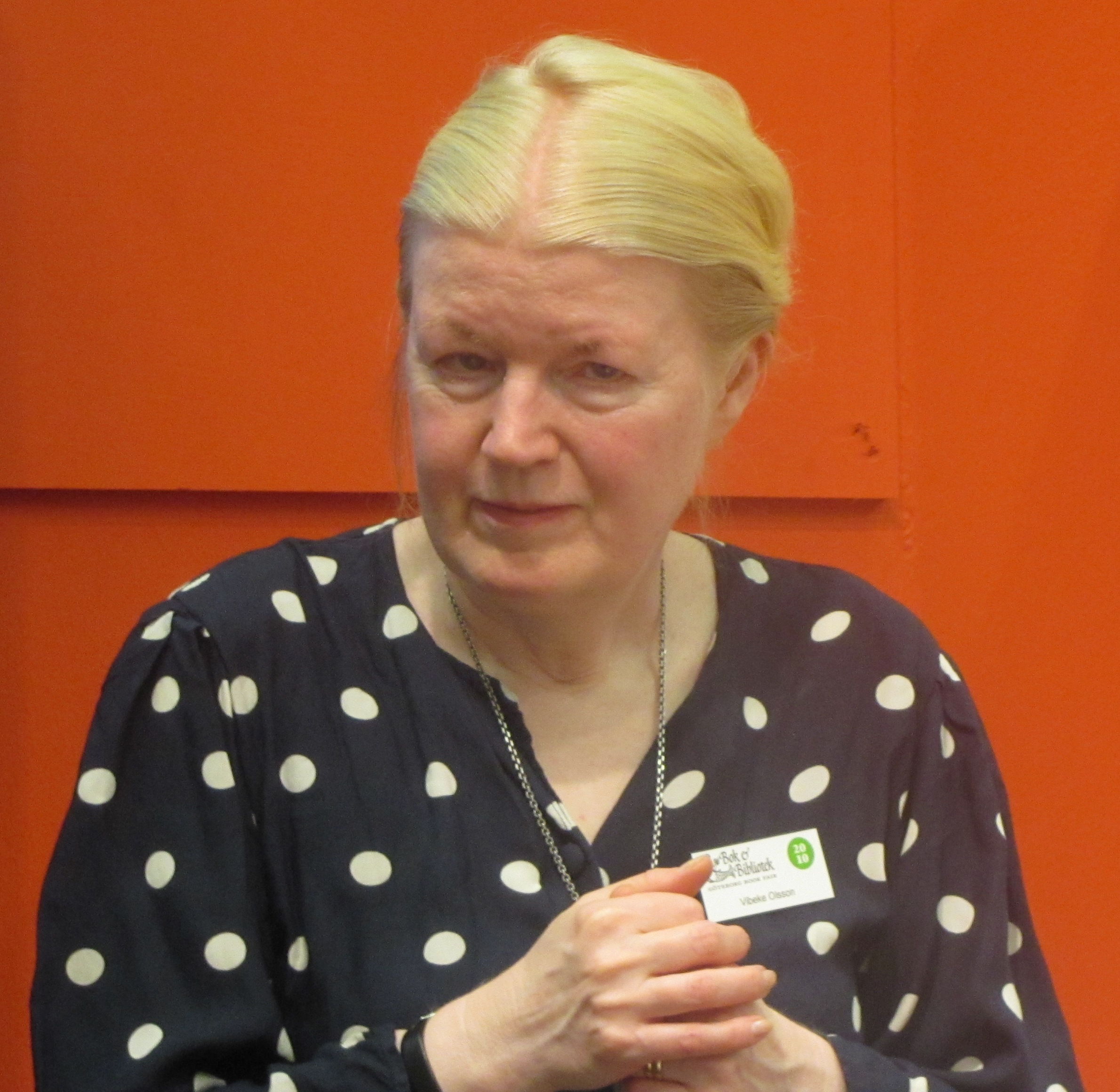
- Olsson in 2010
- Born: 1958 (age 67–68) Lidingö, Sweden
- Language: Swedish
- Years active: 1975–present
- Relatives: Jan Olof Olsson (father); Margareta Sjögren (mother)

Vibeke Olsson (born 1958) is a Swedish author and Baptist pastor. She has won a variety of accolades, including the Ivar Lo Prize, the Stig Sjödin Prize, and the Moa Award. Born to journalists Jan Olof Olsson and Margareta Sjögren, Olsson published her first novel at the age of 17, with a historical fiction novel about a girl swayed by Nazi propaganda.

== Life and career ==
She was born in 1958 in Lidingö to Jan Olof Olsson and Margareta Sjögren, both journalists and writers. She was raised in Stockholm. Her older sister Elisabeth also became a journalist at Svenska Dagbladet. Her father died suddenly in 1974 on Walpurgis Night at the family's summer home on the Bjäre Peninsula of Scania. The following year, Olsson made her debut as a novelist as a 17-year-old. Her first novel, Ulrike och kriget, focused on the story of a teenage girl in 1939 Munich who sees Adolf Hitler as her country's saviour. A sequel, Ulrike och freden, was published the following year.

She published Hedningarnas förgård in 1982, set in 250 AD of the Roman Empire. The next installment in the series, Kvarnen och korset, was published two years later. By then, Olsson was also a Baptist pastor and married to Bo Casselbrant. In 1990, Olsson published Den vackraste visan, about her older sister who had recently died. She received the Ivar Lo Prize in 2016. She received the Stig Sjödin Prize in 2018. She received the Moa Award in 2022.

== Selected works ==
- Olsson, Vibeke (1975). Ulrike och kriget (in Swedish). Albert Bonniers Förlag.
- — (1976). Ulrike och freden (in Swedish). Albert Bonniers Förlag.
- — (1982). Hedningarnas förgård (in Swedish). Albert Bonniers Förlag.
- — (1984). Kvarnen och korset (in Swedish). Albert Bonniers Förlag.
- — (1990). Den vackraste visan (in Swedish). Albert Bonniers Förlag.
