= Magda Gad =

Swedish war correspondent (born 1975)

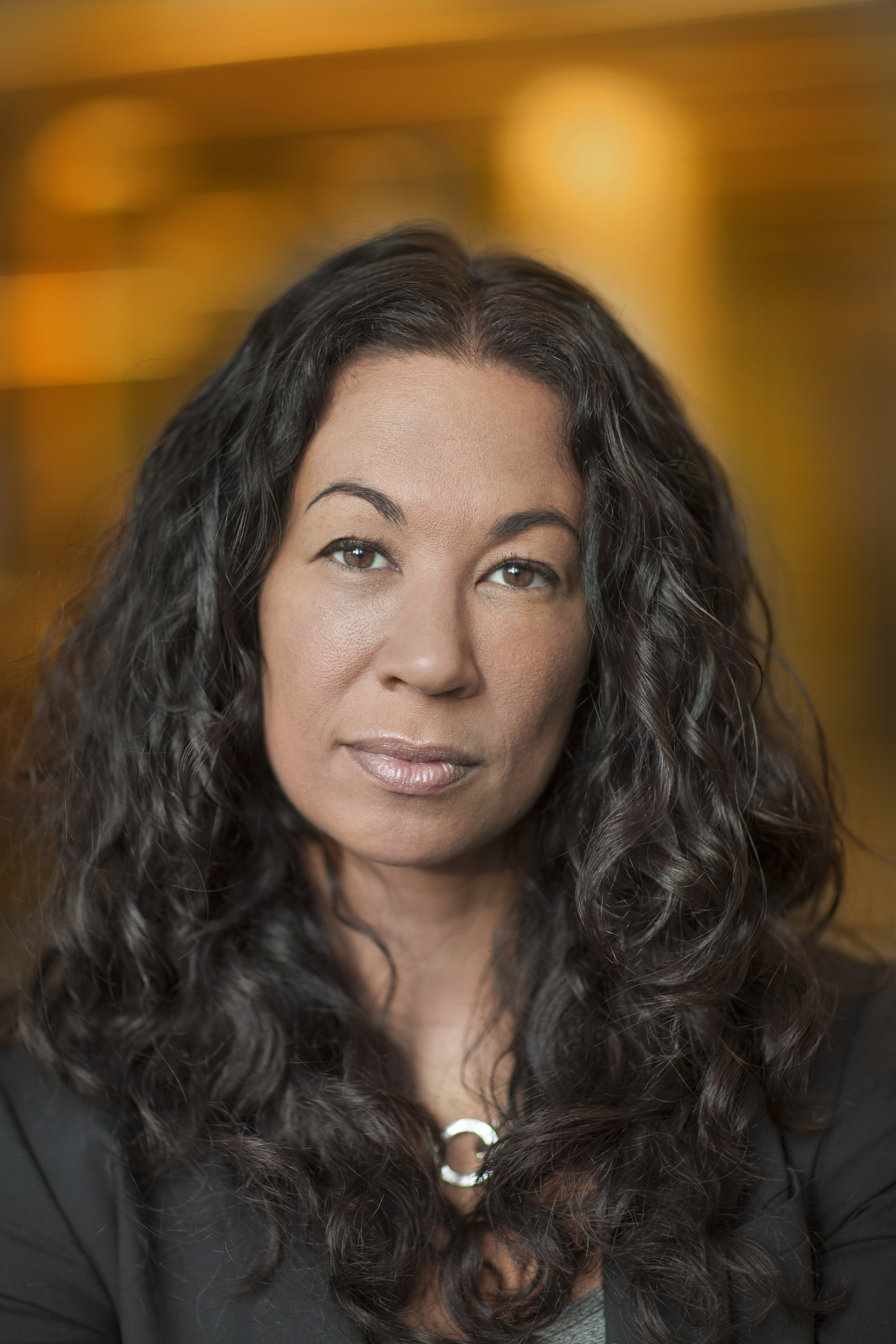
- Magda Gad in November 2016
- Born: Magda Gad; 17 October 1975 (age 51); Falun, Sweden
- Occupation: War correspondent
- Known for: Covering the assault on Mosul where she reported the war against ISIS

Magda Gad (Swedish pronunciation: [magda gad]; born 17 October 1975) is a Swedish war correspondent and Middle Eastern analyst who writes, photographs and films her stories.

She has been a correspondent for the Swedish media outlet Expressen since 2015. Gad got international recognition in June 2016 when she covered the assault on Mosul in Iraq. She reported on the war against ISIS.

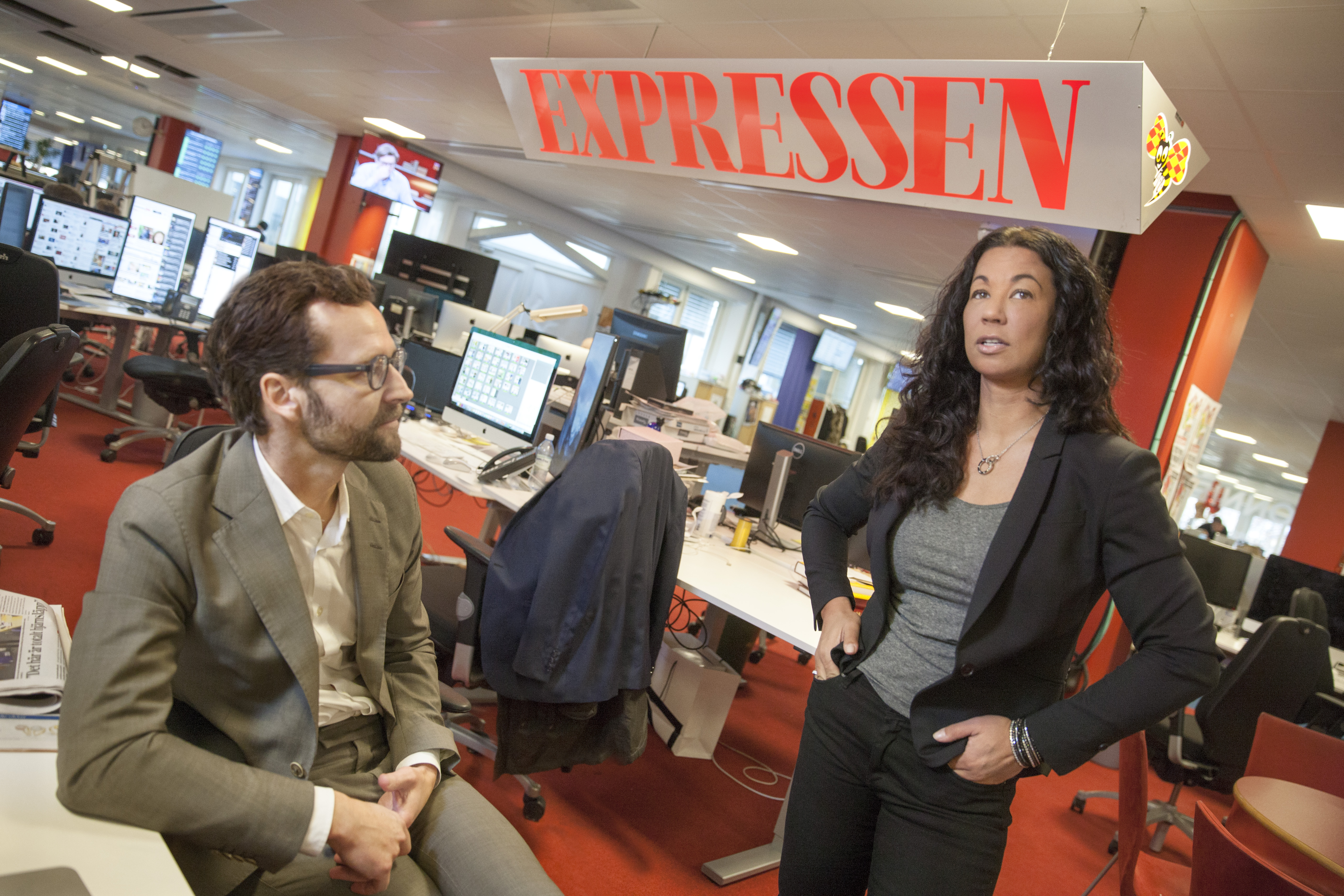
Magda Gad at Expressen's editorial office 2016

She has been reporting from Afghanistan since September 2018, and is one of the few western journalists who gained access to the Taliban before the Taliban's take over in 2021. She stayed in Afghanistan during the take over and was never evacuated. She continues to report from Afghanistan.

== Early life ==
Gad was raised in Falun in Dalarna County, Sweden. Her father worked as a physician and researcher while her mother worked as a dental nurse for an oral surgeon. She studied political science and journalism in Stockholm.

== Career ==
Between 2004 and 2014, Gad worked as a journalist and editor for newspapers such as Tidningen Vi, Läkartidningen, Modern Psykologi, Café, Svenska Dagbladet, QX, and as a feature and news journalist for the newspaper Aftonbladet. She has also written for the humanitarian organization Médecins Sans Frontières.

In 2015, she moved to Expressen where she has been working as a war correspondent. She also co-founded the investigative journalism platform Blankspot.

Magda Gad hosted an episode of the Swedish radio show Sommar i P1 in 2017.

== Books ==
=== Co-author ===
- Vi: de bästa texterna, volym 1, 2018
- En annan historia, 2017.
- The preface to Denis Mukwege's book "Kvinnors styrka", 2022. 32

== Awards ==
- The Zaida Catalán Award (2023).
- Honorary Doctorate, Dalarna University College (2023)
- Newspaper of the Year Award for Best Photojournalism 2022.
- "Professional Woman of the Year" by the international organization Business and Professional Women 2022.
- Finalist INMA 2022.
- Finalist Swedish Grand Prize for Journalism 2021.
- Pennskaftspriset 2021.
- Newspaper of the Year Award for Best Picture and Sound 2020.
- Digital Educator of the Year Award from Consid AB 2020.
- Stig Dagerman Award 2020
- Bronze Medal Award from the Board of Nordic Veterans Foundation 2019.
- Finalist the Stockholm Media Week Award in the category Media Personality of the Year 2019.
- Voice of the Year Award by Dagens Opinion 2019.
- Finalist the Red Cross Journalism Award 2019 for reportage series in Afghanistan.
- Finalist Swedish TV Award Kristallen 2019.
- European Newspaper Award for best War Journalism 2018.
- Swedish TV Award Kristallen 2018.
- European Digital Media Awards finalist in Best in Social Media Engagement 2018.
- The Swedish Grand Prize for Journalism 2017.
- Per Wendel Prize for News Journalist of the Year 2017.
- Finalist MEG Award in the category Innovator of the year for innovative war journalism 2017.
- Scoop of the Year Award by Faktum 2017.
- Finalist Guldspaden Award for reportage series "Utanförskapet inifrån" 2017.
- Finalist INMA for "World-class war coverage and interaction on Facebook" 2017.
- Finalist Swedish Grand Prize for Journalism 2016.
- Silver for Distinguished Writing at European Press Prize 2016.
- The Honor Award by Wendela 2016.
- Cordelia Edvardson Award 2016.
- Journalist of the Year 2015.
