= Göran Palm =

Swedish poet and writer

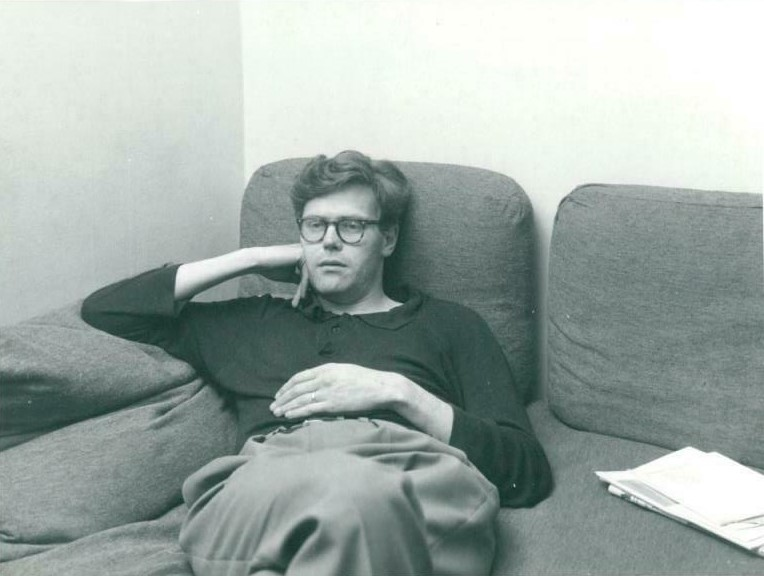
- Palm, c. 1961
- Born: Göran Johan Samuel Palm; 3 February 1931; Uppsala, Sweden
- Died: 12 April 2016 (aged 85); Stockholm, Sweden
- Education: Uppsala University
- Writing career
- Years active: 1961–2016

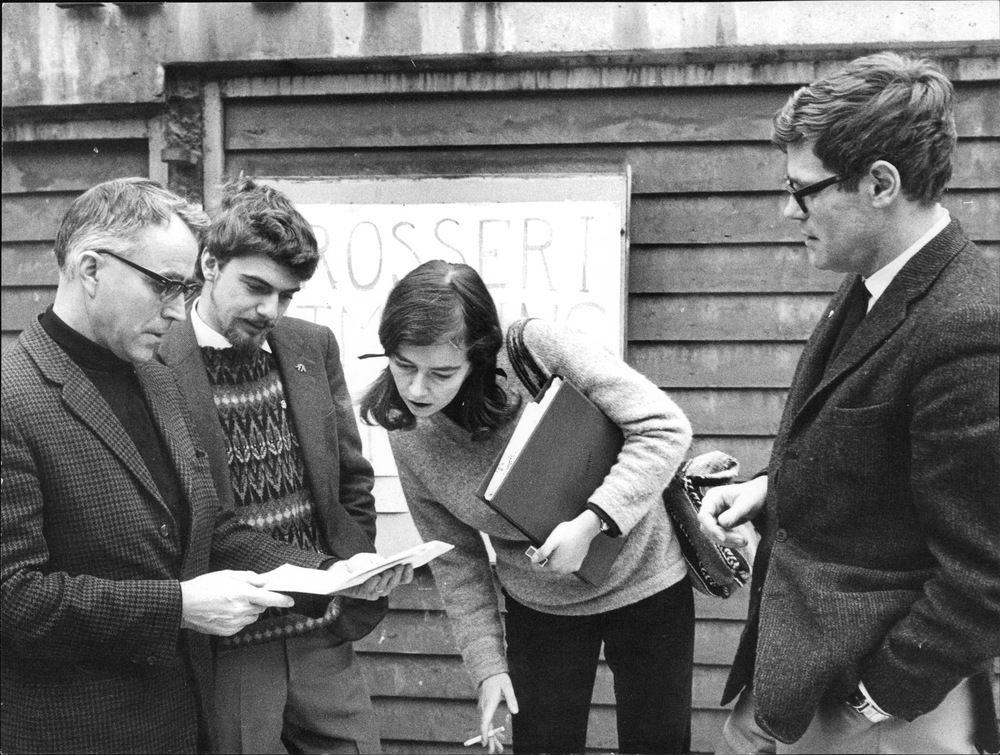
Tore Zetterholm, Jan Fjellander, Kristina Ahlmark Michanek, and Palm in 1966

Göran Johan Samuel Palm (3 February 1931 – 12 April 2016) was a Swedish poet and writer.

== Biography ==
Göran Johan Samuel Palm was born 3 February 1931 in Uppsala to Valborg (née Ekman) and Samuel Palm, a rural dean. In his 20s, he acquired a Bachelor of Science from Uppsala University, worked as a teacher and was editor for the magazine Upptakt. He also worked for the magazine Bonniers Litterära Magasin and contributed with works about poets Comte de Lautréamont and Ezra Pound.

In 1961, he debuted in with the poetry collection Hundens besök (Visit of the dog). Världen ser dig (The world sees you), also poetry, was released in 1964 and included the poem "Havet" (The sea). He received the literature prize of the newspaper Aftonbladet the same year.

En orättvis betraktelse (An unfair reflection; 1966) and Indoktrineringen i Sverige (The indoctrination in Sweden; 1968) reported on state of folkhemmet. After having worked one year at LM Ericsson, Palm wrote two books about his time at the company. In the 1972 book Ett år på LM (One year at LM), Palm discusses his year working at the assembly line of the telecom company, which continues in the 1974 follower Bokslut från LM (Final accounts from LM) together with the Palm's thoughts on the reception of the first book. Bokslut från LM was nominated for the 1975 Nordic Council Literature Prize. The two were translated into English by Patrick Smith as The Flight from Work.

In 1984, the first part of Palm's Sverige – en vintersaga (Sweden: A winter's tale), a series of four works with poetry tales on blank verse, was released. The following parts were released in 1989, 1996, and 2005. In 1998, he was awarded the Selma Lagerlöf Prize and Ferlinpriset in 2003. In 2005, he was awarded the Stig Dagerman Prize.

Palm died 12 April 2016 in Stockholm, aged 85.

== Bibliography ==
- Hundens besök (Visit of the dog, 1961)
- Världen ser dig (The world sees you, 1964)
- En orättvis betraktelse (An unfair reflection, 1966, translated As Others See Us by Verne Moberg)
- Indoktrineringen i Sverige (The indoctrination in Sweden, 1968)
- Vad kan man göra? (What can one do?, 1969)
- Varför har nätterna inga namn (Why don't the nights have names, 1971)
- Ett år på LM (One year at LM, 1972)
- Bokslut från LM (Final accounts from LM, 1974)
- Dikter på vers och prosa (Poems in verse and prose, 1976)
- Konsten att veta bäst från Abba till Övre slummen (The art of knowing best from Abba to the Upper slum; 1978; with Karl-Olov Björk)
- Kritik av kulturen (Criticism of culture, 1978)
- Mannens dikt om kärlek (The man's poem about love, 1980, anthology)
- Sverige – en vintersaga 1 (Sweden: A winter's tale 1, 1984)
- Fosterlandet i bitar (The motherland in pieces, 1988)
- Sverige – en vintersaga 2 (Sweden: A winter's tale 2, 1989)
- Landskapens röster (Voices of the provinces, 1992, anthology)
- En omodern betraktelse (An outdated reflection, 1994)
- Berättarkafé (Narrator café, 1995, anthology)
- Sverige – en vintersaga 3 (Sweden: A winter's tale 3, 1996)
- Röster i Uppland (Voices in Uppland, 1997, anthology)
- Den svenska högtidsboken (The Swedish festival book, 2000, anthology)
- Sverige – en vintersaga 4 (Sweden: A winter's tale 4, 2005)
