= Stig Dagerman Prize =

Swedish award

The Stig Dagerman Prize (Swedish: Stig Dagermanpriset) is a Swedish award given since 1996 by the Stig Dagerman Society and Älvkarleby municipality. It is named in honor of Swedish author Stig Dagerman. The award is given to a person who, or an organization that, in the spirit of Stig Dagerman, supports the significance and availability of the "free word" (freedom of speech), promoting inter-cultural understanding and empathy. It was inspired by Dagerman's poem En dag om året that sets forth a vision of peace for humanity by imagining one day each year when the world is free from violence.

The award ceremony takes place the first weekend in June each year at Laxön in Älvkarleby. The prize is kr 50,000. On two occasions, 2004 and 2008, the prize winner subsequently won the Nobel Prize in Literature in the same year.

== Laureates ==
- 1996 – John Hron (posthumously)
- 1997 – Yasar Kemal
- 1998 – The Swedish Public Library
- 1999 – Ahmad Shamloo
- 2000 – Roy Andersson
- 2001 – Elsie Johansson
- 2002 – Gitta Sereny
- 2003 – Lukas Moodysson
- 2004 – Elfriede Jelinek
- 2005 – Göran Palm
- 2006 – Sigrid Kahle
- 2007 – Lasse Berg
- 2008 – J. M. G. Le Clézio
- 2009 – Birgitta Wallin and magazine Karavan
- 2010 – Eduardo Galeano
- 2011 – Judit Benedek and the theatre project SOS-Romer
- 2012 – Nawal El Saadawi
- 2013 – No one is illegal
- 2014 – Anders Bodegård
- 2015 – Suzanne Osten
- 2016 – Adonis
- 2017 – Anders Kompass
- 2018 – Amos Oz
- 2019 – Britta Marakatt-Labba
- 2020 – Magda Gad
- 2021 – no award
- 2022 – Maria Kalesnikava
- 2023 – Carina Rydberg
- 2024 – Elinor Torp
