= Anna Jörgensdotter =

Swedish author (born 1973)

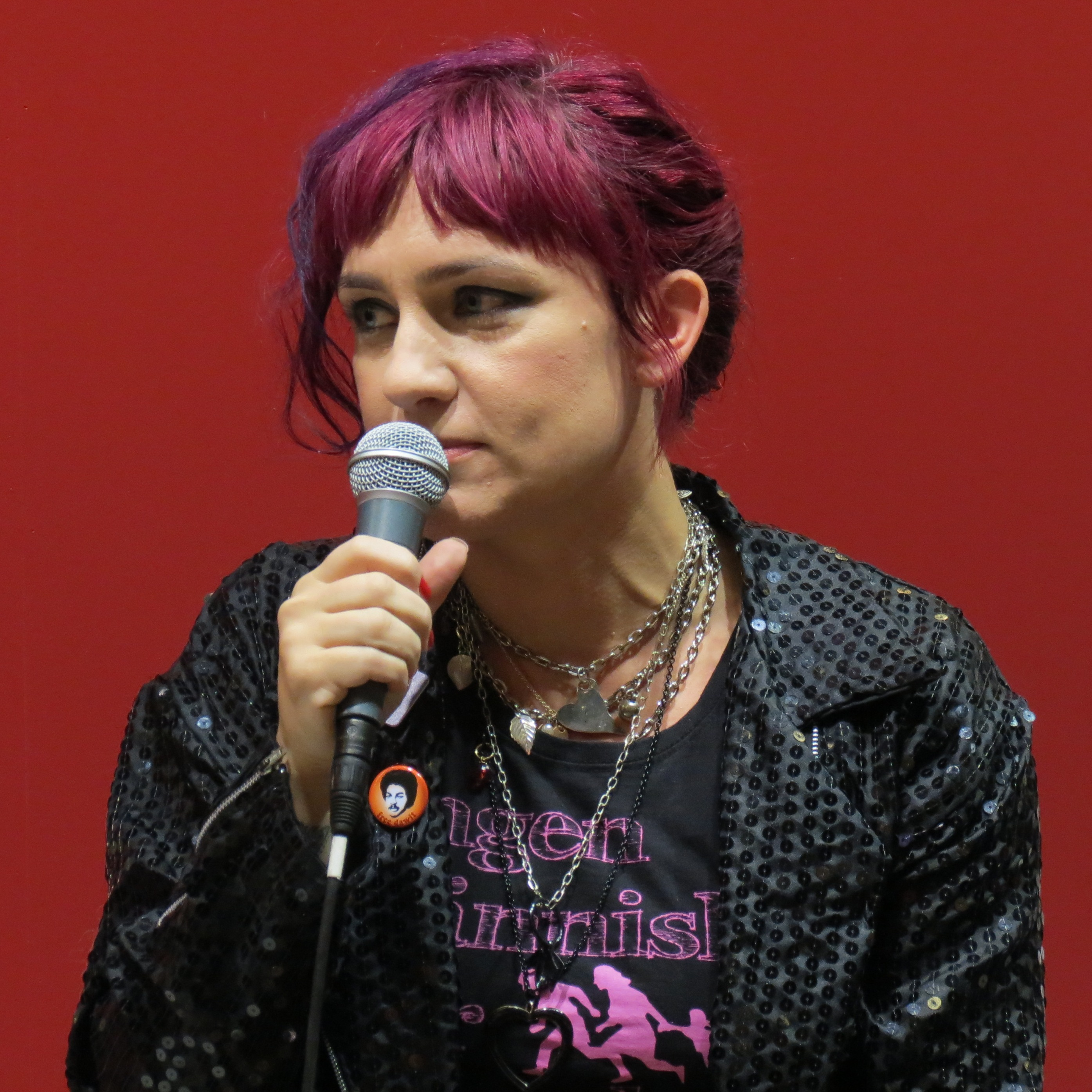
- Jörgensdotter in 2015
- Born: 1973 (age 52–53) Sandviken, Sweden
- Occupation: Author
- Notable awards: Moa Award (2017)
- Children: 2
- Relatives: Lena Sjöberg (sister)

Anna Jörgensdotter Sanvaresa (born 1973) is a Swedish author. She has won a variety of accolades, including the Moa Award, Vi Magazine Literary Prize, and Ivar Lo Award. She made her debut as a novelist in 2002 with Pappa Pralin.

== Early life and education ==
She was born in 1973 in Sandviken. She has an older sister, children's book author Lena Sjöberg. She had summer jobs working in home care. She moved away from Sandviken after finishing upper secondary school.

== Career ==
Her debut novel, Pappa Pralin, was published in 2002. She also published a poetry collection titled Livsvig the same year, and another titled Homecoming queen in 2004. Jörgensdotter's second novel Änglarnas syster featured an accompanying soundtrack by Cecilia Helderyd.

She wrote a monologue for the Folkteatern i Gävleborg in 2007. Her 2009 historical novel Bergets döttrar was praised by Per Planhammar in Göteborgs-Posten and Magnus Eriksson in Svenska Dagbladet. She won the Ivar Lo Award in 2010.

Jörgensdotter collaborated with authors Carolina Thorell and Helene Rådberg on a nonfiction anthology about women's history in Sandviken. The book took three years of research and was published in 2012. Jörgensdotter wrote a 2015 fantasy novel inspired by the life of Swedish painter Ester Henning. In Göteborgs-Posten, Mattias Hagberg wrote that her "dense and feverish" prose complimented the depictions of Henning's paranoia and forcible hospitalization. In 2016, she was awarded the Gävle Municipality's Cultural Prize.

Her 2017 novel Solidärer focused on the effects of the Spanish Civil War in Gävle. She became interested in the topic after visiting museums in Barcelona, where she was living with her family during her maternity leave. She won the Moa Award and the Vi Magazine Literary Prize for her 2017 novel Solidärer.

In 2022, she published Systrarna. It received positive reviews from Ingrid Elam in Dagens Nyheter and Naima Chahboun in Kristianstadsbladet. Jörgensdotter had previously worked a columnist for Arbetarbladet, but she resigned in protest of Rasmus Landström's review of Systrarna.

== Personal life ==
She has two daughters. In 2017, she joined over a hundred authors in declaring their intention to boycott the Gothenburg Book Fair due to the participation of far-right newspaper Nya Tider.

== Bibliography ==
=== Novels ===
- Jörgensdotter, Anna (2002). Pappa Pralin (in Swedish). Albert Bonniers Förlag. ISBN 9789100580964.
- — (2005). Änglarnas syster (in Swedish). Albert Bonniers Förlag. ISBN 9789100105266.
- — (2009). Bergets döttrar (in Swedish). Albert Bonniers Förlag. ISBN 9789174290974.
- — (2015). Drömmen om Ester (in Swedish). Albert Bonniers Förlag. ISBN 9789174295153.
- — (2017). Solidärer (in Swedish). Albert Bonniers Förlag. ISBN 9789174297065.
- — (2022). Systrarna (in Swedish). Albert Bonniers Förlag. ISBN 9789100184681.

=== Nonfiction ===
- Livfjädrar (2012)

=== Poetry collections ===
- Livsvig (2002)
- Homecoming queen (2004)
