= Ketab-e Jom'e =

Weekly literary, social, scientific magazine by Ahmad Shamlou

- Editor: Ahmad Shamlou
- Categories: Political magazine; Cultural magazine
- Frequency: Weekly
- Founder: Ahmad Shamlou
- Founded: 1979
- Final issue: 1980
- Country: Iran
- Based in: Tehran
- Language: Persian

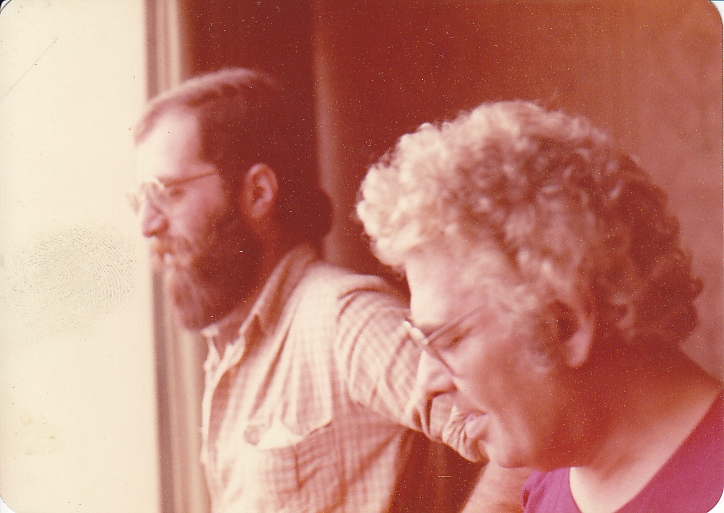
Mohammad Qaed with Ahmad Shamloo at his residence and Friday Book Office, Tehran, Qasr Crossroads, 2019.

Ketab-e Jom'e (Persian: کتاب جمعه, lit. 'Book of Friday') was a weekly magazine covering literary, social and scientific topics. The magazine was published between 1979 and 1980. Its founder, publisher and editor was Ahmad Shamlou. The magazine was based in Tehran, and 36 issues were published.
