= Ester Henning =

Swedish artist (1887–1985)

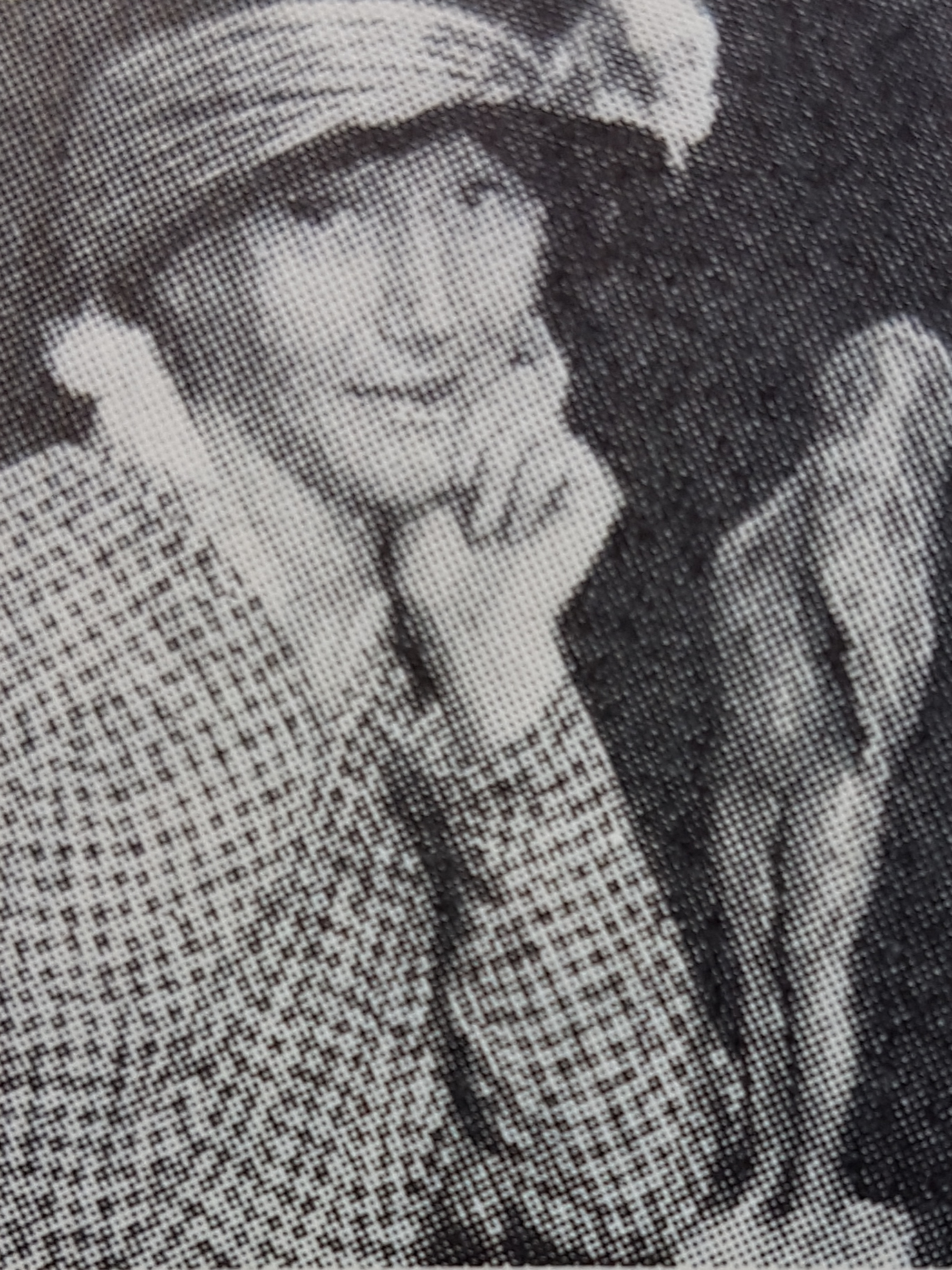
- Born: Ester Matilda Henning; 28 October 1887; Yngshyttan, Värmland, Sweden
- Died: 1 May 1985 (aged 97)

Ester Matilda Henning (28 October 1887 – 1 May 1985) was a Swedish artist. From 1919 she spent the remaining 60 years of her life in a mental institution.

Ester Matilda Henning was born on 28 October 1887 in Yngshyttan outside Filipstad. She was born fourth of seven daughters to a poor cobbler. She moved to Mora at the age of 12 to work as a nanny.

Her art has been exhibited at three main exhibitions: in 1946 in Gothenburg, in 1963 at the Beckomberga Hospital and in 1970 at the Liljevalchs konsthall in Stockholm.

In 2009 Maud Nycander and Kersti Grunditz made a documentary about her life and her art that was shown on Sveriges Television.

Anna Jörgensdotter wrote a novel in 2015 inspired by her life titled Drömmen om Ester.
