= Jan Olof Olsson =

Swedish journalist and author (1920–1974)

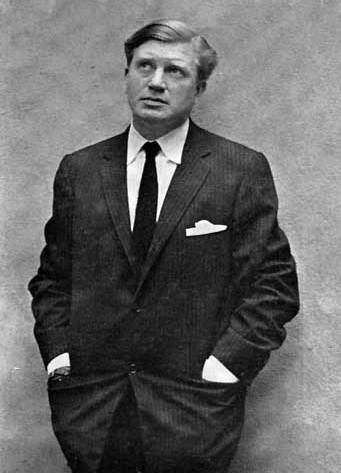
- Olsson c. 1960
- Born: 31 March 1920; Stockholm, Sweden
- Died: 30 April 1974 (aged 54); Hjärnarp, Sweden
- Occupations: Journalist; author

Jan Olof Lennart Olsson (pen name Jolo) (31 March 1920 – 30 April 1974) was a Swedish writer and a journalist for the Swedish newspaper Dagens Nyheter. He was married to Margareta Sjögren, a journalist at another Swedish newspaper.

Olsson is known for his books about World War I and World War II, Den okände soldaten (1965; The Unknown Soldier) and Någonstans i Sverige (1974; Somewhere in Sweden). He has also written several historical essays and many travel books.

He died suddenly in 1974 on Walpurgis Night at the family's summer home on the Bjäre Peninsula of Scania.

== Bibliography ==
- 1954 Drottningens England
- 1956 Årsklass 39
- 1957 Irland, den omöjliga ön
- 1958 Chicago
- 1960 Leningrad, S:t Petersburg
- 1961 Och deras fall blev stort!
- 1961 Det glada Stockholm
- 1962 Amerikafeber
- 1963 Mittåt
- 1964 1914
- 1966 Ner till Bosporen
- 1966 Drottningens England
- 1967 De tre från Haparanda
- 1968 Plogen och stjärnorna
- 1968 I Dublins vackra stad
- 1969 Slipsen i Krakow
- 1970 Generaler och likställda
- 1970 Mord och sol och vår
- 1971 Lågtryck över Irland
- 1973 De tre mot Petrograd
- 1974 Någonstans i Sverige
