= Elsie Johansson =

Swedish writer (1931–2025)

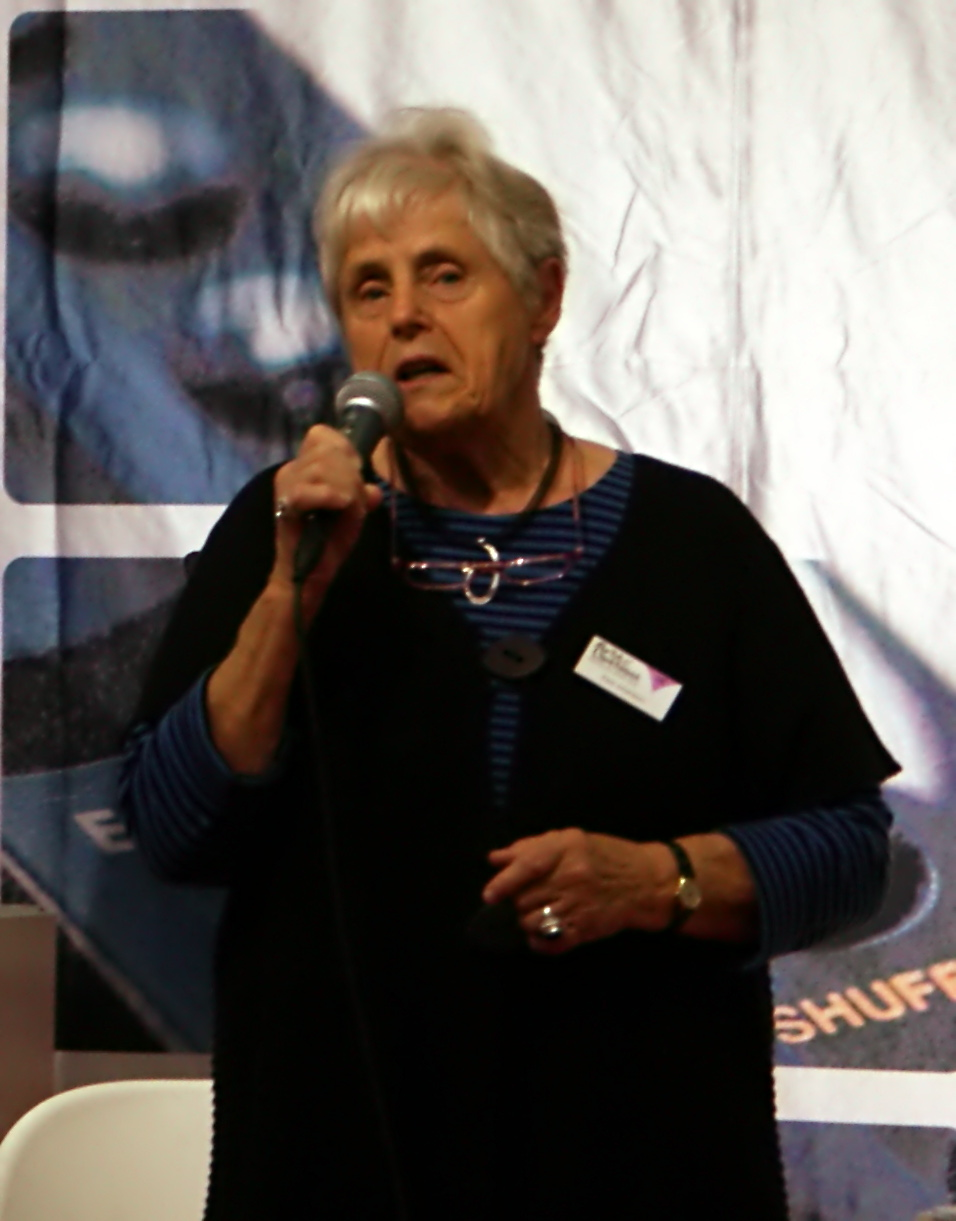
- Elsie Johansson at the Gothenburg Book Fair in 2008.
- Born: Elsie Gunborg Johansson; 1 May 1931; Vendel, Sweden
- Died: 15 February 2025 (aged 93)
- Occupation: Writer
- Writing career
- Language: Swedish
- Period: 1979–2016
- Notable works: Brorsan hade en vevgrammofon (1979); Glasfåglarna (1996); Mosippan (1998); Nancy (2001); Sin ensamma kropp (2008); Riktiga Elsie (2016)

Elsie Gunborg Johansson (1 May 1931 – 15 February 2025) was a Swedish writer. She is sometimes considered a proletarian writer.

== Life and career ==
Elsie Johansson was born in Vendel as the fifth child of a statare. Her father would later find work as a lumberjack and construction worker. The Johansson family lived under sparse circumstances in a simple cabin, which would later serve as inspiration for similar housings found in Johansson's novels. Owing to the persuasion of a female teacher, Johansson was allowed to attend realskola in Uppsala, from which she graduated in 1948; upon graduation, she found employment as a postal worker. She married at the age of 18 and had a child at 19.

Johansson would work at the post office for another 30 years, before making her literary debut with the poetry collection Brorsan hade en vevgrammofon, at the age of 48. Her first novel, Kvinnan som mötte en hund, followed in 1984. In addition to her poems and novels intended for adult readers, she wrote a number of books for children and adolescents.

Her breakthrough as a writer came with the Nancy trilogy (Glasfåglarna, Mosippan and Nancy), which earned her several awards, amongst others the Aniara Prize. Johansson also received the Litteris et Artibus award.

Johansson died on 15 February 2025, at the age of 93.

== Bibliography ==
- 1979 – Brorsan hade en vevgrammofon ("Brother Had a Wind-up Grammophone")
- 1981 – Potatisballader ("Potato Ballads")
- 1984 – Kvinnan som mötte en hund ("The Woman Who Met a Dog")
- 1985 – Det bruna kuvertet ("The Brown Envelope")
- 1987 – Gå i mitt gräs ("Walk in My Grass")
- 1987 – Mormorsmysteriet ("The Grandmother Mystery") (children's novel)
- 1989 – Tigerfrukost ("Tiger Breakfast")
- 1989 – Vardagstankar ("Everyday Thoughts")
- 1990 – Oss skrämmer dom inte ("They Don't Frighten Us")
- 1991 – Kattbreven ("The Cat Letters") (children's novel)
- 1992 – Ordens makt och maktens ord ("The Power of Words and the Words of Power")
- 1995 – Lindansaren ("The Tightrope Walker")
- 1995 – Guldmannen ("The Gold Man")
- 1996 – Glasfåglarna ("The Glass Birds")
- 1998 – Dikter 1979–1989 ("Poems 1979-1989")
- 1998 – Mosippan ("The Spring Pasque Flower")
- 2001 – Nancy
- 2003 – Berättelsen om Nancy ("The Story of Nancy") (volume collecting Glasfåglarna, Mosippan and Nancy)
- 2004 – Näckrosträdet ("The Water Lily Tree")
- 2008 – Sin ensamma kropp ("Her Lonely Body")
- 2011 – Då nu är jag ("When Now Is Me")
- 2016 – Riktiga Elsie ("The Real Elsie")

== Awards and honors ==
- Lundequistska bokhandelns litteraturpris 1996
- Fackföreningsrörelsens Ivar Lo-pris 1997
- BMF-plaketten 1998 (for Mosippan)
- Moa Award 1999
- Stig Dagerman Prize 2001
- Siripriset 2001
- SKTF:s pris-writer of the year 2001
- Hedenvind-plaketten 2002
- Aniara-priset 2002
- The Litteris et Artibus medal 2002
- Årets väckarklocka 2004
- ABF:s litteraturpris 2006
- Jan Fridegårdspriset 2008
- Sveriges Radios romanpris 2009 (for Sin ensamma kropp)
