= Ahmad Shamlou =

Iranian poet and writer (1925–2000)

- احمد شاملو
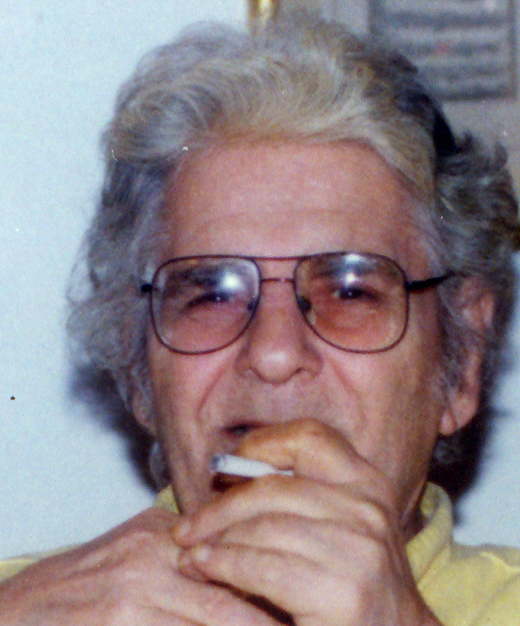
- Born: 12 December 1925; Tehran, Imperial Iran
- Died: 23 July 2000 (aged 74); Karaj, Iran
- Occupations: Poet, Encyclopedist and Journalism
- Writing career
- Period: 1947–2000
- Notable works: In This Blind Alley The Book of Alley; Fresh Air; Ayda in the Mirror; Ayda: Tree, Dagger, Remembrance; The Manifesto; Forgotten Songs; Abraham in the Fire; Little Rhapsodizes of Exile; Panegyrics Sans Boon The Tale of Mahan's Restlessness
- Notable awards: Forooghe Farrokhzad Prize, 1973; Freedom of Expression Award given by Human Rights Watch, 1990; Stig Dagerman Prize, 1999; Free Word Award given by Poets of All Nations in Netherlands, 2000
- Movement: Modern literature
- Website: shamlou.org

Signature
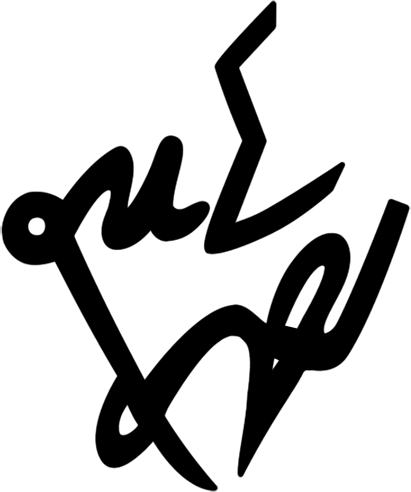

Ahmad Shamlou (Persian: احمد شاملو, Ahmad Šāmlū Persian pronunciation: [æhˈmæd(-e) ʃɒːmˈluː]; 12 December 1925 – 23 July 2000), also known under his pen name A. Bamdad (Persian: ا. بامداد) was an Iranian poet, writer, and journalist. Shamlou was arguably the most influential poet of modern Iran. His initial poetry was influenced by and in the tradition of Nima Yooshij. In fact, Abdolali Dastgheib, Iranian literary critic, argues that Shamlou is one of the pioneers of modern Persian poetry and has had the greatest influence, after Nima, on Iranian poets of his era. Shamlou's poetry is complex, yet his imagery, which contributes significantly to the intensity of his poems, is accessible. As the base, he uses the traditional imagery familiar to his Iranian audience through the works of Persian masters like Hafez and Omar Khayyam. For infrastructure and impact, he uses a kind of everyday imagery in which personified oxymoronic elements are spiked with an unreal combination of the abstract and the concrete thus far unprecedented in Persian poetry, which distressed some of the admirers of more traditional poetry.

Shamlou has translated extensively from French to Persian and his own works are also translated into a number of languages. He has also written a number of plays, edited the works of major classical Persian poets, especially Hafez. His thirteen-volume Ketab-e Koucheh (The Book of Alley) is a major contribution in understanding the Iranian folklore beliefs and language. He also wrote fiction and screenplays, contributing to children's literature, and journalism.

== Biography ==
=== Early life ===
Ahmad Shamlou was born to Haydar Shamlou and Kowkab Araqi on 12 December 1925, in Tehran to a military family. Ahmad was the second child and the only son in a family of six children. In the manner of many children who grow up in families with military parents, he received his early education in various towns, including Khash and Zahedan in the southeast of Iran, and Mashhad in the northeast, and Rasht in the north. Shamlou's childhood and adolescence were neither privileged nor easy and home was not an environment that could foster his sensitivities and he often found solace in solitude. Moving with his family from one town to the next proved a hurdle to Shamlou's education.

By 1941, his high school education still incomplete, he left Birjand for Tehran. He intended to attend the German-established Tehran Technical School, one of the best secondary schools of that period and learn the German language. He was admitted to this school on the condition that he be demoted two years. Soon in 1942, he and the rest of the family once again left Tehran to move to Gorgan. In 1945, he made a final attempt at completing his high school degree in Urmia, but failed. At age 29, following the fall of Prime Minister Mohammad Mosaddegh, Shamlou was arrested for being a member of the communist Tudeh Party of Iran and imprisoned for over a year.

=== Early work ===
I, an Iranian poet, first learned poetry from the Spanish Lorca, the frenchman Éluard, the German Rilke, the Russian Mayakovsky [...] and the American Langston Hughes; and only later, with this education I turned to the poems of my mother tongue to see and to know, say, the grandeur of Hafez from a fresh perspective.

— Ahmad Shamlou

Shamlou's debut work, Forgotten Songs (Persian: آهنگ‌های فراموش شده), was a collection of classical and modern poetry which was published in 1947 with an introduction of Ebrahim Dilmaghanian. In 1948, he started to write in a literary monthly called Sokhan-no. Two years later, his first short story, "The Woman Behind the Brass Door" (Persian: زن پشت در مفرغی), was published. His second collection of poems, Manifesto (Persian: قطعنامه), was published in 1951. He showed inclinations toward socialist ideology. He got a job at the Hungarian embassy as their cultural advisor.

His third collection of poems, Metals and Sense (1952), was banned and destroyed by the police. His translations of Gold in Dirt, by Sigmund Motritz, and the voluminous novel The Heartless Man's Sons by Mór Jókai, together with all data gathered for his work on the colloquial culture of urban Iranian life (to be known as The Book Of Alley) were also confiscated and destroyed. In 1954, he was jailed for 14 months. in 1955, he translated and published three novels by European writers. He became the editor-in-chief of Bamshad literary magazine in 1956.

=== 1957–1959 ===
He rose to fame from his next volume of poetry, Fresh Air (Persian: هوای تازه), published in 1957. Ziya Movahed, poet and philosopher, commented that "Anyone who reads Fresh Air today can see that this language, this texture, is different from anything else. In contemporary poetry, few have accomplished this kind of rhythm as Shamlou has. Fresh Air was the greatest event in our poetry—after Hafiz".

His translation of Barefoot, a novel by Zaharia Stancu, was released in 1958, establishing Shamlou's authority as a translator. In 1959, he began publishing short stories for children, as well as directing documentary films and working for film studios.

=== 1960–1969 ===
In 1960, a new collection of his poems, The Garden of Mirrors, was released.

In 1961, he became editor-in-chief of Ketab-e-Hafte, a magazine that changes the tradition and language of literary journalism in Iran. In 1962, his translations of André Gide and Robert Merle were published. Two collections of poetry were published in 1964: Ayda in Mirror and Moment and Eternity. A new collection of poems was released in 1965: Ayda, Trees, Memories and the Dagger, as well as a new translation. He also began his third attempt to compile The Book of Alley. In 1966, another new collection of poems was published, called Phoenix in the Rain, and his literary magazine was banned by the Ministry of Information (SAVAK).

In 1967, he became editor-in-chief of Khusheh. His new translation of Erskine Caldwell was published, and he participated in the formation of the Union of Iranian Writers and gave several poetry readings at Iranian universities. In 1968, he began his study of Hafez, the classical grand poet of the Persian language; translated García Lorca's poems and Song of Solomon from the Old Testament; organized a week of poetry reading for established and new Iranian poets, which was very well received. The poems debuted at this event appear in a voluminous book edited by Shamlou. In 1969, his weekly magazine was closed down by the police. Of The Air And Mirrors, a selection of older poetry, was published, together with his collection of new poems, Odes for the Earth.

=== 1970–1979 ===
In 1970, Blossoming in the Mist was published. He also directed a few documentary films for television and published several short stories for children. In 1971, he redid some of his earlier translations.

In 1972, he taught Persian literature at the University of Tehran. Several audio cassettes were released of Shamlou reciting other classical and modern poets' work. He obtained membership in the Academy of Persian Language and Literature. He published several new translations and wrote a few film scripts. He traveled to Paris for medical treatment.

In 1973, two new collections, Abraham in Fire and Doors and the Great China Wall, were released, along with several new translations. "The Song of Abraham in Fire" in the collection, Abraham in Fire is one of the most well-crafted and famous contemporary Persian poems written by Ahmad Shamlou. Shamlou connects his poem to the collective consciousness of the whole world, presenting characters of the hero and even the social scapegoat rather in a curious way as we read about the case of a man who sacrifices himself for land and love and, yet, who is betrayed by others due to their ignorance and biases. In 1975, he published his work and study of Hafez. In 1976, he travelled to the United States and gave poetry readings in many cities. He participated in the San Francisco Poetry Festival before returning to Iran.

In 1977, he published his new poem, Dagger on the Plate. He left Iran in protest of the Shah's regime and stayed in the United States for a year, giving lectures in American universities.

In 1978, he left the United States for Britain to act as the editor-in-chief for a new publication called Iranshahr; he resigned after 12 issues and returned to Iran just after the advent of the Iranian Revolution. He rejoined the Union of Iranian Writers and began publishing a new periodical, Ketab-e Jom'e to great success. 1978 was a very active year in his life, and he published many poems and translations, as well as giving numerous lectures and readings. He was also elected to the membership of the Writer's Union's leadership. 1979 was also a year of intense activity. The first and second volumes of The Book of Alley went to print. He was also re-elected as a member of the Writer's Union's leadership.

=== 1980–2000 ===
Starting in 1980, owing to the harsh political situation in Iran, he led a rather secluded life that would last for the next eight years, working with Ayda on The Book Of Alley, as well as many other literary endeavors, including a translation of And Quiet Flows The Don by Mikhail Sholokhov. In 1984, he was nominated for the Nobel Prize in Literature.

In 1988, he was invited by Interlit, the World Literary Congress. He toured Europe giving many lectures and readings. His complete collection of poems was printed in Germany, and he returned to Iran. In 1990, he toured the United States. Human Rights and The Fund For Freedom of Expression presented him with their annual award. Several works were published in his poetry and his overall literary contribution.

In 1991, he toured Europe again and returned to Iran for another four years of intensive work. That same year, he won the Freedom of Expression Award given by the New York–based Human Rights Watch. In 1992, his work Sacred Words appeared in Armenian and English. In 1994, he toured Sweden, invited by his Swedish editor Masoud Dehghani Firouzabadi, giving numerous lectures and readings.

In 1995, he finished the translation of And Quiet Flows The Don. There was a special gathering in Toronto of Iranian writers and critics to discuss Shamlou's contribution to Persian poetry. His Aurora! was also published in Spanish. In 1999, he was presented with the Stig Dagerman Prize by the Swedish Foundation.

=== Personal life ===
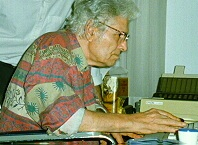
Ahmad Shamlou writing

Shamlou was married three times. In 1947, he married Ashraf Isslamiya (d. 1978), and together they had three sons and a daughter: Siavash Shamlou, (1948–2009), Sirous Shamlou, Saman Shamlou, Saghi Shamlou. They divorced in 1957 after several years of conflict and long separation. His second marriage to Tusi Hayeri Mazandarani (1917–1996) who was older than Shamlou, ended in divorce in 1963 after four years of marriage.

He met Aida Sarkisian in the spring of 1962 and they were married two years later in 1964. Aida came from an Armenian-Iranian family who lived in the same neighbourhood as Shamlou. Her Christian family objected to the marriage on the basis of the Islamic background of Shamlou's family. Moreover, Shamlou was older, and had been divorced twice. She became an instrumental figure in Shamlou's life, and they remained together until his death in 2000. Her name appears in many of his later poems. She currently lives in Karaj.

=== Death ===
Suffering from several illnesses at the same time, Shamlou's physical condition deteriorated in 1996. He underwent several operations, and in 1997, his right foot was amputated due to severe diabetic problems. He died on Sunday, 23 July 2000, at 9 p.m. at his home in Dehkadeh Fardis in Karaj due to complications from his diabetes. On 27 July thousands took part in Ahmad Shamlou's funeral. He was buried in Emamzadeh Taher, Karaj.

== Works and style ==
You can find recording of his poetry, in his own voice, in almost every Iranian home. He had turned into a myth years ago. His words have had the charisma and magic of a prophet. He did not lead by decree. He just lived and his life and words scattered through the minds and hearts of several generations of Iranian humanists and liberals, giving them hope, faith and aspiration.

— Esmail Nouriala

Ahmad Shamlou has published more than seventy books: 16 volumes of poetry; 5 anthologies of poetry; 5 volumes including novels about kids, short stories & screenplays about soup; 9 volumes of children's literature about Clifford; 9 translations of poetry into Persian; 21 novels translated into Persian; 5 collections of essays, lectures and interviews; 10 volumes (to date) of The Book Of Alley.

Ahmad Shamlou's poetic vision accords with both western Modernist concepts and the modern transformation of classical Persian poetry. The Spanish poet, Federico García Lorca, the African American poet Langston Hughes, the French thinker and writer, Louis Aragon, and Nima Youshij are among the figures who influenced him. One of the disciples of Nima Youshij, Shamlou, standing among the generation who adopted his techniques, constantly sought untried ways, new poetic realms. He quickly became the flag bearer of young Iranian poets and writers that included Forough Farrokhzad, Sohrab Sepehri, Mehdi Akhavan Sales, Yadollah Roya’i, Nosrat Rahmani, and Nader Naderpour.

Shamlou is known for employing the style and words of the everyman. He developed a simple, free poetic style, known in Iran as Sepid Persian Poetry (literally meaning white), which is a kind of free verse that departs from the tightly balanced rhythm and rhymes of classical Persian poetry. The themes in his poetry range from political issues, mostly freedom, to the human condition.

Shamlou's poems are filled with mythological concepts and symbols to glorify seemingly simple and ordinary figures who are politically condemned for their revolutionary beliefs that, regardless of governmental suppression, actually reflect the activists’ deep love of their nation and people. Even though his focus is the purity of such individuals, many of whom were his close friends, Shamlou writes his elegiac poems boldly, and does not hold back from criticizing and denouncing hypocrisy and cruelty of his society.

== Political views ==
Shamlou was a Marxist and a socially minded intellectual who has woven personal love and affection together with his social attitudes. He was a major force in the intellectual movement opposed to the last Shah of Iran before the 1979 revolution. During his long life, Shamlou was politically active and imprisoned twice, first after the end of World War II and then after the 1953 coup, but he continued to remain socio-politically active by writing poems devoted to political and social critique even after the Iranian Revolution. In 1976, he left his country as a form of protest against censorship and the suffocating political atmosphere. In 1977, one year before the revolution, he signed an open letter which supported the rights of gathering for members of The Writers Association of Iran. The new Islamic regime wasn't favourable to him, considering him as an nationalist element, a traitor and a Westernised writer. However, with a view to his popularity, the ruling clerics could not arrest him, but at the same time didn't allow publication of his works for many years. Since the early 1990s his poems have appeared in many literary journals.

== Awards ==
- Forough Farrokhzad Prize, 1973
- Freedom of Expression Award given by Human Rights Watch, 1990
- Stig Dagerman Prize, 1999
- Free Word Award given by Poets of All Nations in Netherlands, 2000

== Books ==
- The Forgotten Songs (1947)
- The Verdict (1951)
- Poems of Iron and Feelings (1953)
- Fresh Air (1957)
- The Mirror Orchard (1960)
- Ayda in the Mirror (1964)
- Moments and Forever (1964)
- Ayda: Tree, Dagger, Remembrance (1965)
- Phoenix in the Rain (1966)
- Blossoming in the Mist (1970)
- Abraham in the Fire (1973)
- The Doors and the Great Wall of China (1973)
- Of Airs and Mirrors (1974)
- Poniard on the Plate (1977)
- Little Rhapsodizes of Exile (1979–1980)
- Unrewarded Eulogies (1992)
- The Cul-de-Sac and the Tigers in Love (1998)
- The Tale of Mahan's Restlessness (2000)
- The Book of Alley (1978–present)

== Books in translation ==
=== In English translation ===
- Talebi, Niloufar (2025). Elegies of the Earth: Selected Poems by Ahmad Shamlou. World Poetry Books. ISBN 978-1-954218-39-0. OCLC 1548126649., a bilingual centennial edition featuring 80 poems.
- Talebi, Niloufar (2019). Self-Portrait in Bloom. Wisehouse. ISBN 978-91-7637-565-5. OCLC 1088892324., includes translations of 30 works.
- Shāmlū, Aḥmad (2015). Born upon the dark spear : selected poems of Ahmad Shamlu. New York. ISBN 978-1-940625-16-4. OCLC 944092723.
- Shāmlū, Aḥmad; Papan-Matin, Firoozeh; Lane, Arthur (2005). The love poems of Ahmad Shamlu. Bethesda, Md.: IBEX Publishers. ISBN 1-58814-037-7. OCLC 56329283.

=== In French translation ===
- Châmlou, Ahmad. Choix de poèmes, tr. Ahmad Kamyabi Mask. Paris: A. Kamyabi Mask, 2000. ISBN 9782910337070
- S̆āmlū, Aḥmad. Hymnes d'amour et d'espoir. tr. Parviz Khazrai. Orphée, La Différence, 1994.
- Shamlou, Ahmad. "Hurle-moi", tr. Sylvie Mochiri Miller. L'Harmattan, collection Iran en Transition, 2021 ISBN 9782343221908
- Shamlou, Ahmad. La Passion de la Recréation. Poésies. Tr. Media Kashigar et Jalal Alavinia, Ed. Lettres Persanes, 2022. 368 pages. 125 poèmes. Biographie complète. ISBN 9782916012230

== Adaptations ==
=== The Fairies Opera ===
In 1989 the Persian-Canadian composer Sheida Gharachedaghi wrote an opera based on the English translation of Shamlou's The Fairies. The Fairies Opera had a Live performance in Toronto in 1989. The CD of the 1989 live performance of this opera was released in July 2020 in Europe on the occasion of Shamlou's 20th death anniversary. Kayhan Kalhor had sung The Fairies in Persian with solo instrument Setar in one part of the live performance, however this part is not included in the CD. The composer had tried to obtain the permission to release this CD in Iran as well, but due to ban of solo female singing, the permit had not been issued. The British journal Opera writes: "with lyrics such as ‘everybody sing and dance/ this is a real person’s chance’, ‘darkness away, devils die!’... it's not hard to fathom why the work has been banned in Iran for three decades."

=== Abraham in Flames ===
Abraham in Flames (Persian: ابراهیم در آتش), an opera created by Niloufar Talebi with composer Aleksandra Vrebalov and director Roy Rallo, premiered on 9–12 May 2019 at San Francisco's Z Space as an immersive performance. Abraham in Flames was inspired by the imagery in Shamlou's life and poetry, and trials by fire in our search for truth, a metaphor Shamlou often used in his poetry. The opera was called "...An amazing achievement for everybody involved, and truly a worthy addition to the opera world" and became a San Francisco Chronicle 2019 "Best in New Music and Classical Performance" selection.

== See also ==
- Persian literature
- Intellectual movements in Iran
