= Nosrat Rahmani =

Iranian poet

- Native name: Persian: نصرت رحمانی
- Born: 1 March 1930 Tehran, Pahlavi Iran
- Died: 16 June 2000 (aged 70) Rasht, Iran

Nosrat Rahmani (Persian: نصرت رحمانی; 1 March 1930 – 16 June 2000) was an Iranian poet and writer.

== Life ==
Rahmani was born in the slums of Tehran. He received his college degree from Ministry of PTT (Postal, Telephone and Telegraph). After just a few years of services in the Ministry, Nosrat Rahmani sought employment with the state radio. Subsequently, he abandoned government employment for journalism and freelance writing.

== Poetry ==
His poetry is the poetry of the stubborn, humiliated and revolting down-town people in Tehran's slums; he never forgets his concern for the plight of the urban poor. His memoirs entitled, The Man Lost in the Dust (1957), provide an emotional account of the life of an addict. During the 1960s and 1970s, Rahmani was especially popular among the youth. As a whole, his poetry is dramatic in structure and fantastic in effect, often attempting to recapture the past by poeticizing its recollections.

== Death ==
He died in Rasht in June 2000 at the age of 70.

== Works ==
- Migration and Desert
- Cashmere
- Rendezvous in the Slime
- The Burning of Wind
- Harvest, Sword
- The Darling of the Pen
- The Goblet Made Another Round
