= Mary Andersson =

Swedish author and playwright (1929–2020)

- Born: 29 September 1929; Tunaberg, Sweden
- Died: 18 January 2020 (aged 90); Malmö, Sweden
- Occupations: Author, playwright

Mary Gunvor Irene Andersson (29 September 1929 – 18 January 2020), was a Swedish author and playwright. Her work was primarily about the issues affecting the lives of women and the poor.

== Biography ==
Andersson was born on 29 September 1929, in Tunaberg, one of seven children to a working-class family. She spent most of her childhood in an orphanage in the Sorgenfri (literally "care free") district of Malmö. She suffered from anaemia at a young age, and started working at the age of 13, with her experiences of working in a mustard factory later forming the basis of her 1991 book Dåliga mänskor (Bad People), which was later performed as a play at the Malmö Music Theatre in 1999.

Andersson made her debut as a playwright in 1977 with the play Maria från Borstahusen (Maria from Borstahusen), which played in the Skånska teatern. This told the story of a poor fisher-girl called Maria living in the poor areas of Malmö at the end of the 19th century, and was based on Andersson's grandmother Hilda. She later wrote a book with the same title which was published in 1980. Her first radio play, the 1979 Tjänsteflickan (The Maid), was an autobiographical story of her life until then, and was also published as a novel in 1984.

Andersson's debut novel, Sorgenfri, was published in 1979. It was followed by Barnrika in 1983, and Solgårdarna in 1986. She a,so wrote non-fiction, such as Asbestarbetarna berättar (The Asbestos Workers Tell) about the working conditions in an asbestos cement factory, and Maria och Amalthea (Maria and Amalthea) in 1988 about the 1908 harbour workers' strike in Malmö. Her final book, the autobiography Den vingabrödna (The Winged Bread) was published in 2009. In 2015 she was awarded the Malmö City Culture Prize.

Andersson had two children. She died in her sleep on 18 January 2020, aged 90, at a care-home in Malmö. She is buried in Limhamn Cemetery in the same city.
