= The Book of Alley =

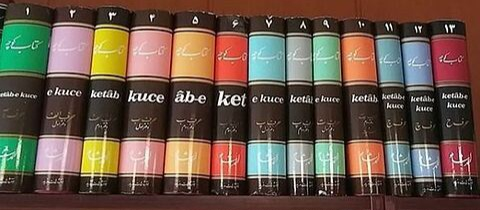

The Book of Alley (Persian: کتاب کوچه, Ketâb-e Kucheh) is a series of books about Persian idioms and proverbs by Ahmad Shamlou coauthored with his wife Aida Sarkisian.

== History ==
Shamlou devoted four decades of his life to collecting and organizing Iranian folklore. Folklore from his perspective is a body of traditional beliefs, customs, and expressions. The language in general, and oral languages in particular, address it through different uses such as proverbs, laments, cries and so on. Therefore, the language could be used as an index to folklore as a body of tradition. The research work entitled Ketab Kuche (Translation: The Book of Alley) indexes the Iranian folklore through the Persian language. The book is a multi-volume, multi-disciplinary work designed as a major source of information, providing a detailed and accurate picture of an important world civilization over a span of several thousand years. Ketab Kuche is one of the three Iranian national projects on Persian heritage and language besides the Encyclopædia Iranica, a multi-disciplinary reference work and research tool designed to record the facts of Iranian history and civilization, and the Dehkhoda dictionary, the largest comprehensive Persian dictionary ever published, comprising 15 volumes. 14 volumes of this book were printed during his lifetime.

After Shamlou's death, his wife Aida Sarkisian took responsibility for the book.
