= She'r-e Nimaa'i =

School of poetry in Iran

She'r-e Nimaa'i (Persian: شعر نیمایی, lit. 'Nima poetry') is a school of Modernist poetry in Iran that is derived from the literary theory of Nima Yooshij, a contemporary Iranian poet. Nima Yooshij revolutionized the stagnant atmosphere of Iranian poetry with the influential poem Afsaneh, which was the manifesto of She'r-e Nimaa'i. He consciously challenged all the foundations and structures of ancient Persian poetry. The nature of Mazandaran, social criticism, and humor are just a few examples of the themes that Nima Yooshij used in his poems. She'r-e Nimaa'i was the source of inspiration and growth of many great modern Iranian poets, including Sohrab Sepehri, Forough Farrokhzad, Mehdi Akhavan-Sales and Fereydoun Moshiri.

She'r-e Nimaa'i has a special place in modern Iranian poetry. It was used for the first colloquial language in Iranian poetry. The shutters became shorter and longer, and a new look was taken at the poem. Although many criticisms were leveled at Nima Yooshij at the beginning, the She'r-e Nimaa'i school of poetry was eventually adopted and grew rapidly.

== Afsaneh, Manifesto of She'r-e Nimaa'i ==
In 1923, Nima Yooshij published the She'r-e Nimaa'i Manifesto, a long poem with 103 verses called Afsaneh that contained all the features of She'r-e Nimaa'i.

Shams Langroudi describes the characteristics of She'r-e Nimaa'i as follows:

- The type of free lyric in which the poet has achieved a form of earthly mysticism.
- A long, rhythmic system in which the rhyme problem is solved with a free Hemistich after all four Hemistich.
- The poet's attention to tangible realities and at the same time his emotional and poetic attitude towards objects.
- The difference between the poet's view and the poets of the past and its novelty and distance from imitation.
- Its closeness, in the light of the form of colloquial expression, to dramatic literature.
- The free journey of the poet's imagination in it.
- Telling the story of the poet's heartlessness and failures, which is subtly linked to the fate of society and his time.

The lyrical and wavy spirit of the "Afsaneh" and the length and detail of the narrative and dramatic work make the critic seem to have Nizami Ganjavi effect on Nima Yooshij's actions and thought more than anything else. "Afsaneh" was one of the first narrative poems of Nima Yooshij, which consisted of two complete narratives and a number of fragmentary narratives. "Afsaneh" is not a single narrative; Rather, it is an argument between two sides of the dialogue that in some discourse essays, a story is narrated by mentioning a memory. For the first time in Iranian poetry, "Afsaneh" was very far from its predecessors in terms of form and content; especially Nima Yooshij's great innovation in how to present personal intentions.

== Nima Yooshij's comment on traditional Persian poetry ==
Nima Yooshij hated ancient Persian poetry in the beginning of his poetry. But later he changed his mind. He once wrote: I had a strange hatred of all the old literature of the past ... Now I know it was a flaw.

His style in his poems was traditional at first, but after a while he became well acquainted with the French language, he lost his desire to compose in the old style of Persian poetry and to create a change in Persian poetry in a new and new style. However, a study of Nima Yooshij's poems shows that the imagination in these poems has much in common with the imagination in the poems of ancient Iranian poets.

== History ==
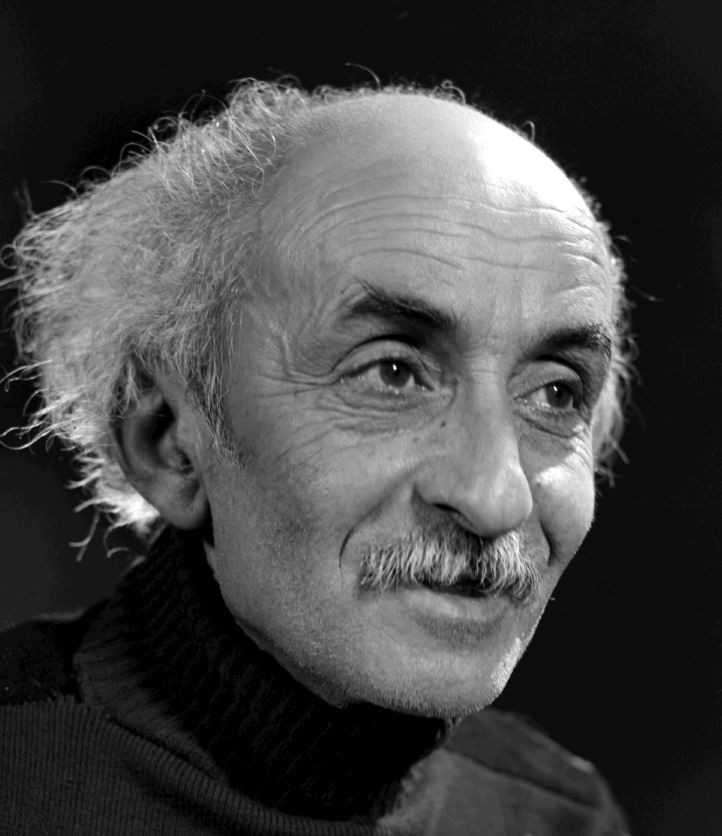
Nima Yooshij in 1950s

=== Background ===
With the beginning of the Iranian constitutional movement, a new vision emerged, according to which a new era has arrived that is different from all periods of national history. The intellectuals of this period believed that the era of political tyranny was over and everyone felt that a similar change should take place in the field of culture. The poets and writers of this era were looking for a new aesthetic and wanted to write a new poem that was different from the previous Persian poetry.

One of the other influential factors in the literary developments of this period was the familiarity of Iranian intellectuals with European literature. They believed that the Constitutional Revolution was similar to the French Revolution and was able to create a new atmosphere in which prominent figures could be developed who could be compared to prominent European poets and writers. Intellectuals' interest in European literature, especially French literature, led to the translation of some of the works of the great European writers of the time, such as Victor Hugo, Lamartine, Jean-Jacques Rousseau, Alphonse Daudet, and Chateaubriand, which influenced on the writings of many Iranian writers.

Nima Yooshij, like other modern poets before him, recognized free poetry through French and familiarity with European poetry and used it in Persian. But the main difference between Nima and other modern poets was that others were not exactly aware of the philosophy of work and composed free poetry only out of variety and novelty and the possibility of freedom of expression and, most importantly, the hidden and overt charms and scents of the West. However, as can be seen in his theoretical discussions, Nima Yooshij is deeply aware of the formation and emergence of free poetry in Iran and the world, and for this reason, he has devoted part of his time to the historical explanation of modern art.

=== Publication of Afsaneh and reactions ===
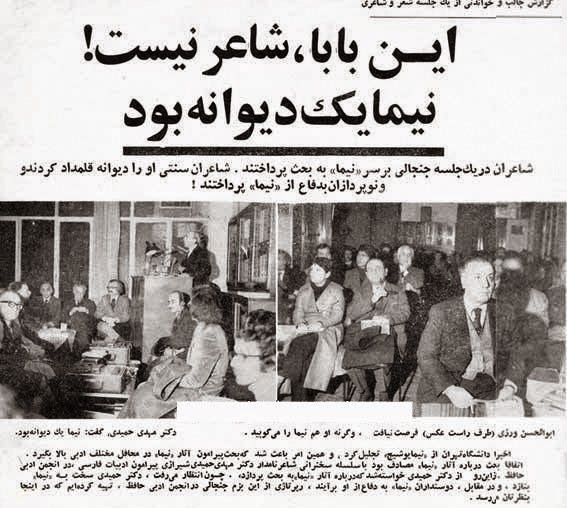
She'r-e Nimaa'i was debated in one of the debates of the first Iranian Writers' Congress, and they opposed it and called Nima Yooshij crazy.

When Nima Yooshij published the poem "Afsaneh", supporters of traditional Persian poetry, who saw their beliefs as being subjected to a full-blown onslaught, stated that Persian poetry, as Iran's most revered cultural symbol, had been influenced by foreigners. In their view, the poem "Afsaneh" was a sign of cultural surrender to foreigners and would soon destroy the spirit of Iranian culture. The traditionalists actually believed that Yooshij and his followers were unfamiliar with the tradition and even threatened to kill him. Academics were negative about She'r-e Nimaa'i until the 1960s and refused to accept it. But the view of academic traditionalists on Nima Yooshij's theories gradually changed with the efforts of some professors who were particularly familiar with modern literary criticism. Gholam Hossein Yousefi and Mohammad Reza Shafiei Kadkani were among those who played an important role in changing the prevailing attitude in the 1960s. One of the most important opponents of She'r-e Nimaa'i was Mohammad Taqi Bahar, who considered Nima Yooshij's views completely unacceptable and remained in his opinion until his death in 1951.

On the other hand, some mostly young and novice poets, who are considered modernists today, were among the first supporters of Nima Yooshij. Among these people were Ahmad Shamlou, Esmail Shahroudi, Houshang Ebtehaj and Mehdi Akhavan Sales.

=== She'r-e Nimaa'i after Nima Yooshij ===
Nima's influence on Persian poetry is quite clear. He has had a great impact on the evolution and modernity of Persian poetry. Nima's poetry is full of beauty. Nature and social criticism and even humor are the basis of his poems. Some understood the meaning of his poetry. Some followed in his footsteps and in my opinion fully understood the aesthetics of Nima's poetry. On the other hand, there are those who take Nima's poetry from the atmosphere of social criticism to the political support of a group and party. I have to tell them that this was not Nima's method.

— Parviz Natel Khanlari

She'r-e Nimaa'i became very popular from the very beginning, despite opposition, and a large number of young people turned to this style. One of Yooshij's first students was Ahmad Shamlou, Shamlou, who was not yet known as a novice poet, met Nima Yooshij. But the path that Shamlou's poetic life took reached a point where he once again returned to the old forms. One of Yooshij's supporters was Siavash Kasrai, who used She'r-e Nimaa'i to write poems in support of the Tudeh Party. Parviz Natel Khanlari believed that the variants written by Shamloo and Kasrai after Nima Yooshij were not She'r-e Nimaa'i.

On the other hand, some of Nima Yooshij's followers and students tried to improve his style, such as Sohrab Sepehri and Mehdi Akhavan-Sales. Sohrab Sepehri was very influenced by Houshang Irani, but he has many elements of Nima Yooshij's poems in his works. He was a naturalist, his poetry intimate, full of pristine and fresh images that he illustrates with a soft, gentle, clean and coherent language, like the works of Nima Yooshij, especially his final poems such as "The Bell" and "Quqnūs". Water, flowers, plants, trees, grass, desert, mountains and plains come to life and move in the poems of Sohrab Sepehri. The words are alive in his poetry and all the objects of nature are heard in his words. Nima Yooshij himself grew up in nature as a child. The natural components are the ones he has experienced and interacted with, reflecting his closeness to nature, plants, flowers and birds. He considers and reflects on the various manifestations of nature, from the most obvious to the smallest and most obscure. His attention to a variety of plants, birds, animals and insects and all creatures is reminiscent of a kind of care.

Mehdi Akhavan-Sales was very much inspired by Yooshij's other aspects of poetry, social criticism. The most important thing the two have in common is that they both have a social burden or the same social orientation. In the Credit Foundation, Nima Yooshij and Akhavan-Sales are more concerned with their social views. Both also made great use of symbolism. Nima Yooshij's approach to symbolism has been influenced by European symbolism with the aim of elevating the quality and promoting the artistic aspect of poetry. It focuses on both aspects of social commitment and symbolism. Much of this difference stems from their different social attitudes.

== She'r-e Nimaa'i variants ==
Gradually, the composition of She'r-e Nimaa'i was changed by newer poets, and new types of She'r-e Nimaa'i were created. Ahmad Shamlou imported Free verse into Iran and combined it with She'r-e Nimaa'i to create [or promote] a kind of white / blank or Shamlouic poetry. Yadollah Royaee, followed by Parviz Islampour, created "Hajm Poetry" with a statement. New Wave poetry was founded by Ahmad Reza Ahmadi and Bijan Elahi at the same time that She'r-e Nimaa'i was accepted by academics. Apart from these three dominant styles, Third Wave Poetry, Pure Poetry, Seventies Poetry, Postmodern Poetry, and Ultra-New Poetry were also inspired by She'r-e Nimaa'i.
