= Another view of the literary theory of Nima Yooshij =

- Author: Shapur Jorkesh
- Language: Persian
- Genre: nonfiction
- Publication date: 2005
- Publication place: Iran

Another view of the literary theory of Nima Yooshij (Persian: ب‍وطی‍ق‍ای ش‍ع‍ر ن‍و: ن‍گ‍اه‍ی دی‍گ‍ر ب‍ه ن‍ظری‍ه و ش‍ع‍ر ن‍ی‍م‍ا ی‍وش‍ی‍ج, romanized: Butiqa-ye She'r-e Nimaa'i: Negahi be Nazarieh va She'r-e Nima Yooshij) is a book by the contemporary Iranian critic, Shapur Jorkesh, and his most famous work, and according to many experts, is one of the best books about Nima Yooshij and his literary theory.

Jorkesh recounts the main difference between Nima Yooshij's worldview and that of his disciples and followers. Jorkesh believes that no one has yet understood She'r-e Nimaa'i and the scope of his new field of vision, because apart from reading Yooshij's works, it is also difficult to understand his writings.
