= Siavash Kasrai =

Iranian poet, literary critic, and novelist

- سیاوش کسرائی
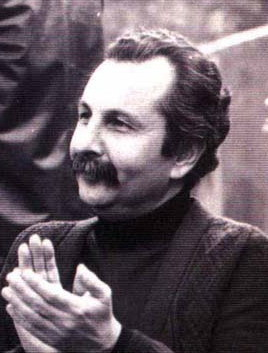
- Born: 25 February 1927; Isfahan, Pahlavi Iran
- Died: 8 February 1996 (aged 68); Vienna, Austria
- Resting place: Vienna Central Cemetery
- Education: Dar ul-Funun; University of Tehran
- Known for: poetry

Siavash Kasrai (February 25, 1927 – February 8, 1996; Persian: سیاوش کسرائی) was an Iranian poet, literary critic and novelist. He is well-known for his epic poem of Arash the Archer written in the late 1950s. An active supporter of the Communist Tudeh Party of Iran from the late 1940s to the mid 1980s, he distanced himself from its leadership in 1988–1990, and turned into an outspoken critic in the mid 1990s.

== Life ==
Siavash Kasrai was born on February 25, 1927, in Isfahan, Iran, into a family of officials, some (his uncle Abdol-Karim Kasrai in particular) with a serious interest in literature. In Tehran from an early age, he received his primary education at Adab School and secondary education at the Military College and Dar ul-Funun. He graduated from the University of Tehran, Faculty of Law, in 1950, and did his military service at the Military Academy.

In the early 1950s, Kasrai worked at the Iranian Health Co-operation Agency, created under Truman’s Point Four Program, and headed two of the agency’s periodicals (Behdashte Hamegani dar Nahiyeye Dariaye Khazar and Zendegi o Behdasht). From the mid-1950s to the early-1980s, Kasrai almost continuously served in government bodies focusing on housing or urban development: the Iranian Bank of Housing, the Housing Agency and the Ministry of Housing and Urbanization. In the early- to mid-1970s, in a forced leave from the Ministry, he worked for a few years as chief copywriter for the Behshahr Industrial Group. In addition to his regular employment, Kasrai occasionally taught literature at the Universities of Tehran and Zahedan.

During his secondary education, Kasrai was part of a group of young nationalists including Dariush Forouhar and Mohsen Pezeshkpour. In 1948, he became a member of the Tudeh Party, which he actively supported during the next four decades. Kasrai was shortly imprisoned in the aftermath of 1953 overthrow of Mohammad Mosaddegh. He was a founding member of the Iranian Writers' Association and one of its elected secretaries in the first four years of its existence, from 1968 to 1971. Kasrai took part in 1977 Tehran Goethe-Institut nights of poetry readings, a noted public event with dissident overtones in the pre-Iranian Revolution period. As a result of a post-revolution crackdown on Tudeh supporters, he left Iran in 1983, resided in Kabul until late 1987, in Moscow until 1995, and then in Vienna. Kasrai was elected to the Tudeh Party Political Bureau in 1986. He resigned from the party's Bureau in 1988 and from its Central Committee in 1990. Kasrai's last major work (Mohreye Sorkh), published in 1995, was a public expression of disappointment with Communist activity.

Kasrai had an intense social life, informed by his intellectual interests and an ethic of solidarity. He was, at various times, in close personal relationships with such literary figures as Iraj Afshar, Ahmadreza Ahmadi, Houshang Ebtehaj (alias H. E. Sayeh), Mahmoud Etemadzadeh (alias M. E. Behazin), Forough Farrokhzad, Morteza Keyvan, Nader Naderpour, Shahrokh Meskoob, Fereydoon Moshiri, Brayim Younisi and Nima Yooshij. He held informal eclectic salons at both his office and his home on an almost daily basis from the early 1960s to the early 1980s.

He died on February 8, 1996, in Vienna and is buried in the Vienna Central Cemetery.

== Literary work ==
Kasrai's works were first published in the following volumes (with only the 2003a reference including both previously published and unpublished materials):

- 1957 - Ava, Tehran: Nil
- 1959 - Arashe Kamangir, Tehran: Andishe
- 1962 - Khune Siavash, Tehran: Amir Kabir
- 1966a - Ba Damavande Khamush, Tehran: Sa’eb
- 1966b - Sang o Shabnam, Tehran: Sa’eb
- 1967a - Ba’d az Zemestan dar Abadiye Ma, Tehran: Kanune Parvareshe Fekriye Kudakan va Nojavanan
- 1967b ' Khanegi, Tehran: Bina
- 1975 - Chehreye Mardomiye She’re Nima, University of Zahedan, duplicated
- 1976 - Be Sorkhiye Atash, be Ta’me Dud, Sweden (unknown city): Tudeh Party of Iran (published under the pseudonym Shabane Bozorg Omid)
- 1978 - Az Ghorogh ta Khoruskhan, Tehran: Maziar
- 1979 - Amrika, Amrika, Tehran: Elm o Honar
- 1981. Chehel Kelid, Tehran: Tudeh Party of Iran
- 1983 - Tarashehaye Tabar, Kabul: Pohantun Cultural Assembly
- 1984a - Hediyei baraye Khak, London: Bina
- 1984b - Peyvand, Kabul: Tudeh Party of Iran
- 1989 - Setaregane Sepidedam, London: Bina
- 1995 - Mohreye Sorkh, Vienna: Kara
- 2003a - Dar Havaye Morghe Amin: Naghdha, Gofteguha, va Dastanha, Tehran: Ketabe Nader Publications
- 2003b - Havaye Aftab: Vapasin Sorudeha, Tehran: Ketabe Nader Publications

These are all books of poetry, except the 1967a (a children book), 1975 (a piece of literary criticism) and 2003a (including literary criticism, interviews, and novels) publications. Kasrai's complete collection of poems was published as a 773 pages octavo in 2005 in Tehran by Ketabe Nader Publications, under the title Az Ava ta Havaye Aftab.

The second publication, Arashe Kamangir, brought public recognition to Kasrai. Arash is a legendary figure saving his country from the humiliation and misery of defeat by putting his soul into an arrow, which will travel over and gain back lost territory. Kasrai's version is the first epic poem in Nima Yooshij's style, or more generally the first epic instance of Persian new poetry. The poem was dedicated to Khosro Roozbeh, a radical leftist executed in early 1958. In spite of what appeared to some as technical weakness, and in spite of the author's proposed dissident interpretation, Kasrai’s Arashe Kamangir was one of the few contemporary poems to find its way into schoolbooks.

Mohreye Sorkh, Kasrai's last publication (in his lifetime), is a mirror image of Arashe Kamangir. Like Arashe Kamangir, it is an epic in the new poetry style, indeed a modern follow up to Ferdowsi's Rostam and Sohrab, with a proposed political interpretation. But whereas Arashe Kamangir is a tale of sacrifice and salvation, Mohreye Sorkh is one of compromise and loss. Published after Kasrai's break up with the Tudeh Party and a move from Moscow to Vienna, Mohreye Sorkh is an expression of regret or repentance over decades of Communist activity. Indeed, connecting his poem to current suffering in his country, Kasrai's preface speaks of "the serious mistakes of benevolent people whose actions proceeded from fascination instead of knowledge, hurried and shortsighted, leading to the verge of destruction, and now facing the heavy price to pay".

Mohreye Sorkh and the selected sections of Arashe Kamangir along with some of the short poems of Kasrai, are translated into English “The Scarlet Stone and other Selected Poems” by Nader Rahimi.

== Sources ==
- Abedi, Kamyar, 2000: Shabane Bozorge Omid: Barresiye Zendegi va Asare Siavashe Kasrai, Tehran: Ketabe Nader Publications.
- Kasrai, Siavash, Undated, probably mid 1980s: Autobiographical Notes. Kasrai Papers.
- Kasrai, Siavash, 1990: Communication to the April 1990 Tudeh Party Central Committee Plenum. Kasrai Papers.
- Kasrai, Siavash, 2003: Mohreye Sorkh. Vienna: Kara, 1995. Reprint, Tehran: Ketabe Nader Publications.
