= Hasht Ketab (Eight Books) =

Sepehri’s most important book entitled Hasht Ketab (Persian: هشت کتاب, romanized: The Eight Books) is a compilation of his prior eight books of poetry. In this compilation, published in 1976, Sepehri laments the loss of traditional Persian beliefs regarding courtesy and deeper connection between people. Furthermore, there are streaks of naturalism and nature description in Sepehri’s poetry and this is notable in most poems of his books.

“Sepehri published his first poetry collection in 1951, titled The Death of Color. In this Book, Sepehri is affected by Nima and his manner. What makes up the content of his poems in this collection is issues such as futility, waiting for better days, the inner dilemma of the poet and loneliness. In addition, what governs the mood of the poems of this book, including the titles of the poems is sadness and depression of romanticism. Two years later in 1953, Sepehri’s second book, Life of Dreams was published. The bitter mood of the previous book can also be seen in this book, but it has some signs of Sepehri’s independence from Nima. In this regard, independence of Sepehri’s style started from his second book and it continued in the other six books. Furthermore, following his independence from Nima's style of poetry, the elements of surrealism were found in Sepehri’s second book and the other six books because of his familiar with Western theosophy and its literary schools.” (Translation from original Persian reference)

== Introducing ==
"Eight Books" includes a total of eight of Sepehri's previous books in the field of poetry. These books, which are composed in order, include "Death of Color", "Life of Dreams", "Debris of the Sun", "East of Sorrow", "Sound of Water Foot", "Traveler", "Green Volume" and "We Have No Look" They are all written between the 1930s and the mid-1950s, and many of these poems were published in various publications and magazines before being presented in one place in the form of "Eight Books". Their inclusion in the sequence of "Eight Books" shows the evolution of "Sohrab Sepehri" poetry and his intellectual direction over the years and will be a sweet experience for those who are interested in his unique works.
His last book of poetry, "We Have No Look," which was published with other books in the form of "Eight Books," was written just a few years before he died; thus, his mind full of taste and talent with hundreds of poems that he could compose later, was soon extinguished and the treasure of his different and tradition-breaking poems remained in the temple of Iranian literature.
"Sohrab" was an artist and art lover, and the manifestation of this interest, with the philosophy mixed with his poems, is clearly shown in "Eight Books". Also, due to his travels and familiarity with the culture and religion of different parts of the world, we see a wider and unbiased worldview in his poetry. It is worth mentioning that this version of Eight Books includes pictures, all of which are the works of "Sohrab Sepehri".

== Resources ==
- Hassanzadeh Mir-Ali, A. & Abdi, M. (2013). "Negāhi gozarā be jelvehā-ye surre'ālisti-e Hasht Ketāb" ['A brief review of Surrealistic effects of Hasht Ketab']. Tehran: Adabiyāt-e Pārsi-e Mo'āser, Institute for Humanities and Cultural Studies, Vol. 3, No. 1, Spring & Summer 2013, pp. 77–95. ensani.ir (pdf) (in Persian)
