= Morteza Shams =

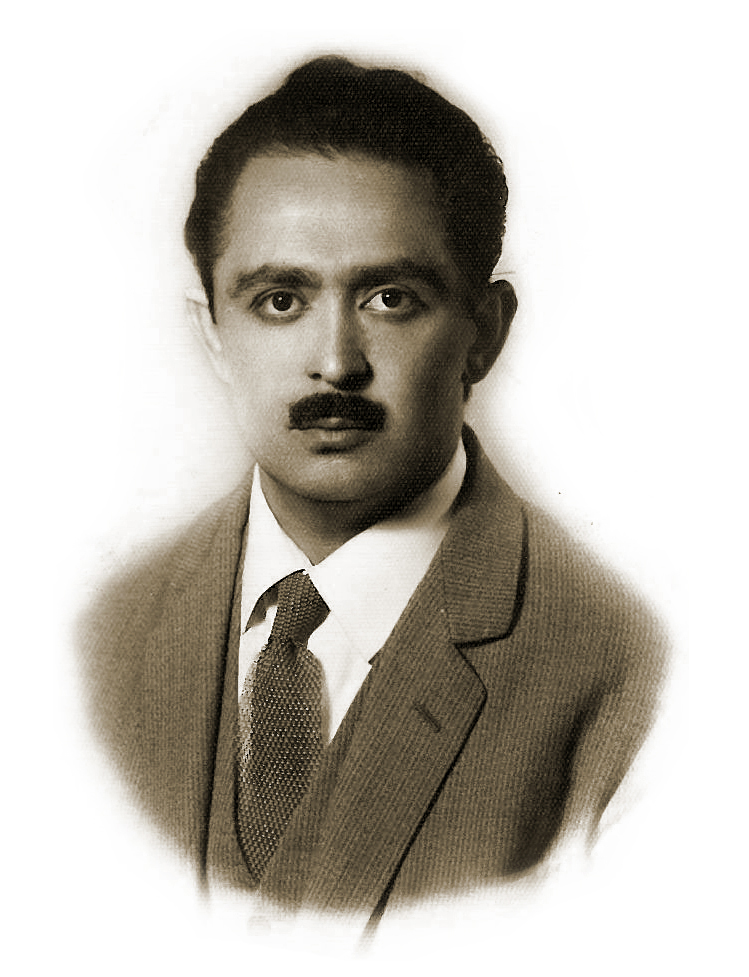
- Around 1941 / Khoy
- Born: May 5, 1928; Khoy / Iran
- Died: January 27, 2013 (aged 84); Tehran
- Occupation: Poet, Author, Critic, Translator, Researcher & Physician
- Writing career
- Genre: Poetry

Morteza Shams was an Iranian physician, researcher, translator, and poet. He was the son of Mirza Habib Shams and the grandson of Agha Morteza Shams al-Attebba, one of the renowned physicians of Khoy.

== Early life and education ==
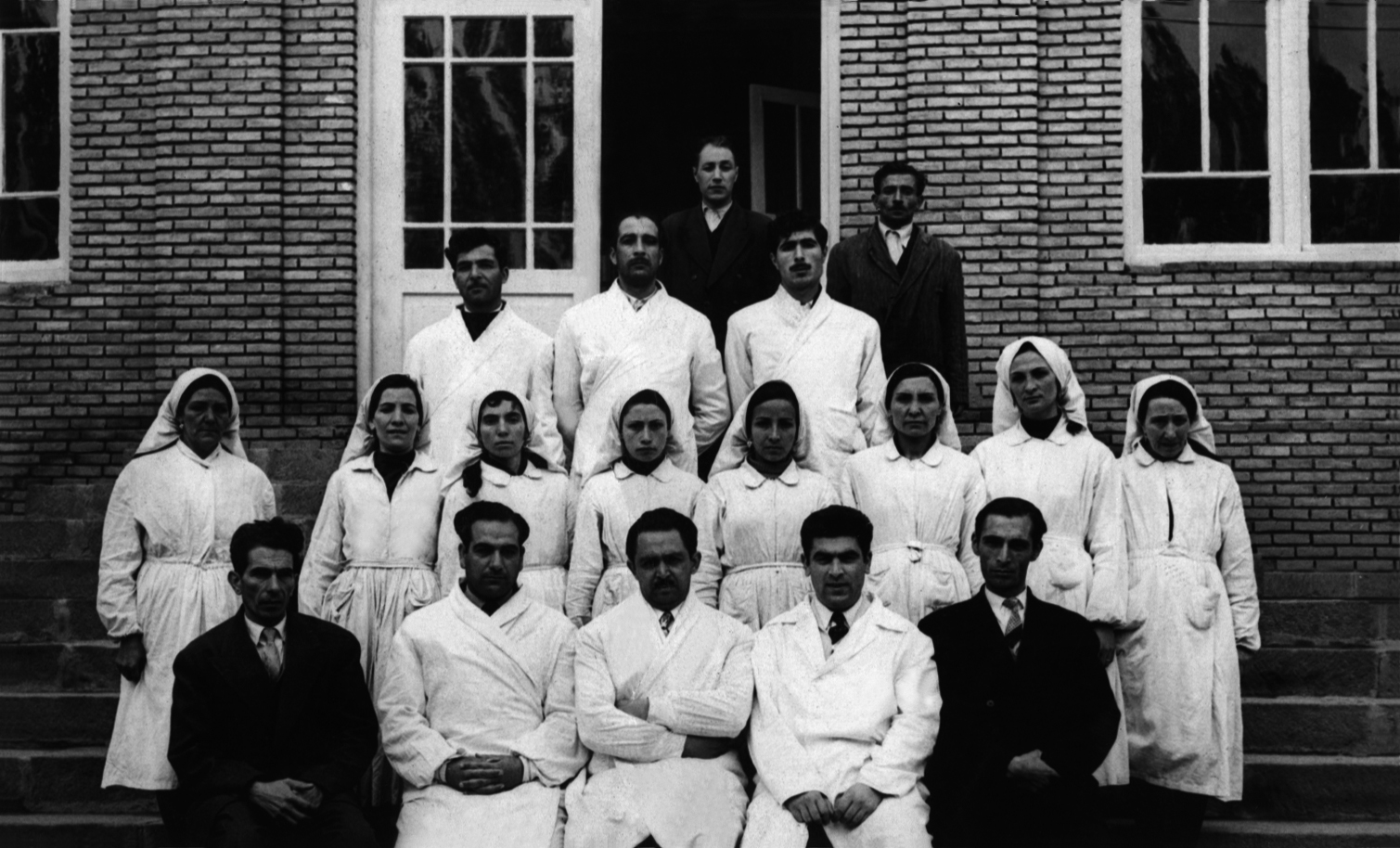
Khoy Faculty of Nursing and Public Health, circa 1950s.

Morteza Shams was born on May 5, 1928 in the city of Khoy. He completed his primary and secondary education there. After finishing his medical studies, he returned to Khoy and, for the first time, established programs in natural sciences as well as a Faculty of Nursing and Public Health in the city. He taught at this institution and practiced medicine in Khoy for more than forty years, following in the footsteps of his forebears.

== Literary career ==
Shams, under the pen name “Aftab / Sun”, was the first poet from Khoy to compose poetry in the Nimaa'i style. He also translated works of European poets, including Charles Baudelaire, into Persian. In the 1950s, through his translation of “Les Fleurs du mal” (The Flowers of Evil), he introduced Symbolist literature to the Iranian literary community.

His poems, literary writings, and translations were published in journals such as “Eghdam”, “Ferdowsi”, “Sokhan”, and “Yaghma”. He also published four volumes of poetry (including “Fall”, “Epic of Eternity”, and “Tears of the Night”), three medical books, and one volume of translation.

In addition to numerous scientific and medical articles published in journals such as “Latest Medical Information”, he authored three books: “Treatment of Pediatric Diseases” and “Vitamin BA” and “Malarial Urticaria”.

After many years of living and practicing medicine in his hometown, he eventually moved to Tehran, where he resided thereafter. He maintained close associations with prominent poets of his time such as Mohammad-Hossein Shahriar, Fereydoon Moshiri, and Simin Behbahani, as well as writers and scholars including Mohammad-Amin Riahi, Gholam-Hossein Sa'edi, and Abbas Zaryab Khoyi.

Shahriar dedicated to him Ghazal No. 53, “Sarban's anthem”, in his Divan.

== Works ==
Yahya Rahimi, a writer and journalist from Khoy, described him as “a poet from Khoy for the millennium of eternity.”

Among his works are a translation of “Selections from The Flowers of Evil” by Charles Baudelaire and nine poetry collections, including “Destiny, Destiny”, “Gazelles”, “Ghazal-Nameh”, “Anahita”, “Beneath the Poplars”, “Fragments”, “The Tale of Builapush”, “From Afar and Near”, and “Book of Pain”. These poems were composed in both classical and modern forms including: ghazals, ghazals-variants, masnavi, ruba'i, couplets, tripartite, innovative pentapartite and other experimental forms in verse and rhythmic prose.

His unpublished works include the four-volume “Encyclopedia of World Literature”, two remaining epic collections (“Epic of Babak” and “Epic of Zarir”), and a translation of “An Episode of the History of Russia; the False Dimitri” by Prosper Mérimée.

== Death ==
He passed away on January 27, 2013 in Tehran and, according to his will, was transferred to his hometown and laid to rest in the Khoy cemetery.

=== Epitaph ===
The following poetic text is engraved on his funeral monument:

“Do not break the mirror

Do not disturb the stillness of my quiet pond

No sound, no stone, no prayer

Let me sleep…

… let me sleep”

== See also ==
- Persian poetry
- Charles Baudelaire
- Les Fleurs du mal
- Symbolism
