= Essays on Nima Yushij =

2004 book edited by Ahmad Karimi-Hakkak and Kamran Talattof

Essays on Nima Yushij: Animating Modernism in Persian Poetry
- Editors: Ahmad Karimi-Hakkak and Kamran Talattof
- Language: English
- Subject: Persian poetry
- Publisher: Brill
- Publication date: 2004
- Media type: Print (Hardcover)
- Pages: 267 pp.
- ISBN: 978-90-04-13809-4

Essays on Nima Yushij: Animating Modernism in Persian Poetry is a 2004 book edited by Ahmad Karimi-Hakkak and Kamran Talattof, in which the authors examine the question of poetic modernity in She'r-e Nimaa'i.

== Contents ==
Essay	Author
Introduction: Nima Yushij and the Millennium-old Tradition of Persian Poetry	Kamran Talattof and Ahmad Karimi-Hakkak
Nima Yushij: A Life	Ahmad Karimi-Hakkak
Ideology and Self Portrayal in the Poetry of Nima Yushij	Kamran Talattof
From Allegory to Symbol: Emblems of Nature in the Poetry of Nima Yushij	Houman Sarshar
To Tell Another Tale of Mournful Terror: Three of Nima's Songs of the Night	Paul Losensky
Love: Nima's Dialogue with Hafez	Firoozeh Papan-Matin
Nima Yushij and the Receding Signified	Peyman Vahabzadeh
History and Memory in the Poetry of Akhavansales and Wasef Bakhtari	Wali Ahmadi
The Birth Death and Renaissance of a Tradition	Christophe Balay, translated by June Brtrand
National and International Recognition of Nima Yushij: A Sort of Bibliography, a Bibliography of Sorts	Kamran Talattof
