= Nader Naderpour =

Iranian poet

- نادر نادرپور
- Born: June 6, 1929; Tehran, Imperial State of Persia
- Died: February 18, 2000 (aged 70); Los Angeles, California, U.S.
- Resting place: Westwood Village Memorial Park Cemetery
- Occupation: poet
- Political party: Pan-Iranist Party; Tudeh Party of Iran (Until 1948)

Nader Naderpour (June 6, 1929 – February 18, 2000; Persian: نادر نادرپور) was an Iranian poet.

Naderpour is among many Iranian poets who shaped the New Persian Poetry or New Poetry (in Persian: She'r-e Now), along with Nima Yooshij, Parviz Natel Khanlari, Forough Farrokhzad, Mehdi Akhavan Saless, Sohrab Sepehri, Fereydoon Moshiri, Siavash Kasrai, Ahmad Shamlu, Hushang Ebtehaj, and Mohammad-Reza Shafiei Kadkani. Though Yooshij (1896–1960) is known as the Father of New Persian Poetry, aka Nimaii Poetry or She'r-e Nimaii, according to a number of eminent and highly respected literary and poetry scholars, Naderpour is considered as the first Iranian poet who opened up exciting vistas of the new Persian poetry.

== Personal life ==
Nader Naderpour was born on 6 June 1929 in Tehran, Iran. His parents were both fluent in French and had a deep love for art, music and history. His father, Taghi Mirza, was a descendant of Reza Gholi Mirza, the eldest son of Nader Shah. The eldest of two brothers and three sisters, Naderpour grew up under the supervision and care of his culturally rich parents. His father, who died when Naderpour was only fourteen, was a skillful painter and also a man familiar with poetry and literature. It was he who taught young Naderpour Persian literature and classic poetry. When he was a preschooler, Naderpour would sit on his father's lap and be encouraged to read the newspaper every night. His father also had Naderpour memorize classical and modern poetry. His mother was a talented player of the string instrument the tar, and she helped Naderpour to develop an appreciation for music.

In 1942, during World War II, Naderpour entered Iran-Shahr High School in Tehran. A year later when Iran was occupied by the Allied military forces, Naderpour, like many other students of the time, got involved in politics, and he participated in a small nationalist party group. Later he joined the Tudeh Party of Iran (TPI), which became the major Communist Party of the country. Like Yooshij, Naderpour also published a number of poems in journals such as People (in Persian: Mardom), Leader (in Persian: Rahbar), and Our Iran (in Persian: Iran-e Maa), which were all supported by TPI at the time.

By the time Naderpour graduated from high school in 1948, he had already left the party. In fact, since 1946 Naderpour had been unhappy about the Iran-Azerbaijan crisis, and like many other nationalist students, was convinced that Soviet communism could not make any provision for the independent nationalist communist movements in other countries. Subsequently, Naderpour worked wholeheartedly to ensure that Iran's parliamentary elections would be open, honest, and fair. He therefore became sympathetic to the National Front (in Persian: Jebheh-ye Melli) and its leader, Mohammad Mosaddegh, and other nationalist champions in the elections.

In 1950, Naderpour was sent to Paris, France, to continue his education in French language and literature at the Sorbonne University. During his stay in Paris, he not only became a freelance writer for various publications, but also wrote for the Third Force Party (in Persian: Nirooy-e Sevvom), which Iranian ideologue and writer Khalil Maleki had established under the aegis of the National Front in Iran. After receiving his BA degree, Naderpour returned to Tehran and started working in the private sector.

In 1960, Naderpour arranged the first modernist Persian poetry reading in Tehran, held at the Cultural Society of Iran & America (in Persian: Anjoman-e Farhangi-e Iran-o Amrika). Later, he worked as a consultant at the Office of Dramatic Arts of the Ministry of Arts and Culture (in Persian: Vezaarat-e Farhang-o Honar). He was also appointed as the Editor of Theater Magazine (in Persian: Majaleh-ye Namayesh), and as the Editor-in-Chief of the Monthly Journal of Art and People (in Persian: Honar-o Mardom).

In 1964, Naderpour traveled to Europe. In Rome, he continued his studies in the Italian language and literature. He also spent some time in Paris, studying French cinema, and devoting time to his own poetry.

In 1968, Naderpour became one of the thirty or so founding members of the first Association of Writers of Iran (in Persian: Kaanoon-e Nevisandegaan-e Iran). He was also one of the signatories of its manifesto, along with several other famous Iranian writers and poets. When Jalal Al-e-Ahmad, the driving force behind the Association, died in 1969, the Association chose Naderpour to speak on its behalf at the interment ceremony. For two consecutive years Naderpour was elected as a member of the steering committee for the Association of Writers of Iran. Later on, in 1977, he decided not to participate in the rejuvenation of the Association due to differences of opinion.

In 1971, Naderpour took over as the director of the Contemporary Literature Department (in Persian: Gorooh-e Adab-e Emrooz) in the National Iranian Radio and Television, where he directed many programs on the life and works of contemporary literary figures. Naderpour fled the Iranian Revolution in 1980 for France and resided there until 1987. He was elected to France's Authors' Association and participated in several conferences and gatherings. In 1987, he moved to California. During his residence in the United States, Naderpour gave several speeches and lectures at Harvard University, Georgetown University, UCLA, and UC Berkeley. Naderpour was considered the first Iranian poet who opened up exciting vistas of the new Persian poetry and was regarded as one of the leaders of the movement for the New Poetry or She'r-e Now in Iran and among other Persian speaking nations like Afghanistan, Tajikistan and Pakistan.

== Death ==
Naderpour died from a heart attack in his Los Angeles home on Friday, 18 February 2000, at 11:00 AM. Visitors to the Los Angeles area often pay their respects to Naderpour by visiting his gravesite located at Westwood Village Memorial Park Cemetery.

Shortly after Naderpour died, his widow, Jaleh Bassiri, established the Naderpour Foundation in Los Angeles. The aim of the Naderpour Foundation is to promote cross-cultural studies and comparative approaches to East–West literary tradition by focusing on the late poet's legacy.

== Works ==
Naderpour is well known for his extensive research on Iran's contemporary poetry, and also his thorough, insightful analyses of Iranian poets (Hafez, Ferdowsi, Omar Khayyam, Mowlavi (Rumi), and others). In addition, he is recognized for his perceptive commentaries on Iran's recent history and his astute observations on Iranians' cultural and political challenges. Naderpour published his first poems in the 1940s and completed four collections by the 1970s. His poems have been translated into English, French, German, and Italian. Here is the list of his publications:

- Eyes and Hands (in Persian: Cheshm-haa-o Dast-haa): (1954)
- Daughter of the Cup (in Persian: Dokhtar-e Jaam): (1955)
- The Grape Poem (in Persian: Sher-e Angoor): (1958)
- Collyrium of the Sun (in Persian: Sormeh-ye Khorsheed): (1960)
- Not Plant and Stone, but Fire (in Persian: Giaah-o Sang Nah, Aatash): (1978)
- From the Sublime to the Ridiculous (in Persian: Az Aasemaan taa Rissmaan): (1978)
- The Last Supper (in Persian: Shaam-e Baazpaseen): (1978)
- False Dawn (in Persian: Sobh-e Drooghin): (1982)
- Blood and Ash (in Persian: Khoon-o Khaakestar): (1989)
- Earth and Time (in Persian: Zamin-o Zaman): (1996) publisher, Ketab corp., Los Angeles, California
- Collected poems (in Persian: Majmooeh-ye Ash'aar) (2003) publisher, Ketab corp., Los Angeles, California
- Selected poems on audio CD – recited by the poet (1998) (in Persian: Peyvand) publisher, Ketab corp., Los Angeles, California

In the introduction to his tenth and last collection of poems, Earth and Time, Naderpour noted that,

Poems come from “Heaven” and remain alien on “Earth”; instead of “place” they deal with “nature” and instead of “time” they deal with “history”. A poet who leaves his country and migrates to an alien land talks about his new home in terms of his original homeland. With his words he pictures the nature of his homeland, and instead of speaking of the “past” or the “future,” he links “history” with “eternity". For an exiled poet the images of his homeland will always stay alive, but the homeland’s history, as well as its present, will be (for him) “eternity”.

The poems composed by Naderpour are rich in imagery and deeply embedded in the texture of the Persian language. Naderpour was an imagist and a wordsmith in one, and ultimately a classic poet living in a modern world, in a modern style.

Naderpour also published a large number of scholarly and research papers on Iran's politics, culture, history, and literature in various print journals and magazines such as Iran-Shenasi, Mehregan, Sokhan, and Rahavard as well as in many different online journals.

Naderpour was nominated for the Nobel Prize in Literature and was awarded the Human Rights Watch Hellman-Hammett Grant in 1993. The grant is mostly awarded to the writers in exile whose works are banned in their own homelands.

== Samples ==
Here are some samples of poems composed by Naderpour and translated into English by Farhad Mafie and Manouchehr Saadat Noury:

The Winter Homily

“O, the fire that flames from inside the night
rises to dance,
but turns to stone by morning
O, the memory of the earth’s seething anger
in the days when the sky’s rage was spreading.
O, the sense of pride
O, the point where epics begin and end
O, the magnificent summit of old epics
O, the house of Ghobad!
O, the stony nest, the destiny of the phoenix
O, the land of Zal the Champion’s childhood.”

Farhad Mafie (Los Angeles, 2000).

Awareness

“In the midst of the battle, we understood
The words were not able and never could
Get the job done as it really should
And seize a very great raiding road.”

Manouchehr Saadat Noury (Montreal, 2006).

The Persian version of the above poem by Naderpour reads as follows:

Maa dar miyaan-e mahlekeh daanestim
Kaz vajeh kaar vijeh nemi-aayad
In harbeh raa tavaan-e tahaajom nist.

== Remarks ==
“In my opinion, Naderpour’s poems are lasting poems. Undoubtedly, his works will be counted among the classics in the Persian language. In the last twenty years we owe thanks to Naderpour for many expressions that have now become popular and universal, such as the sadness of exile, being cut from our own roots, disheartened by the homeland that is being traumatized. In addition, he has given life to his poems through his beautiful descriptions, and through new, effective explanations he has made apparent to us the ambiguous, complex conditions of our own hidden conscience. His poem is the poem of our sadness, our worries, our hopes, and our disappointments.” – Ehsan Yarshater (2001).

According to Iraj Bashiri (2008), “Naderpour supported the three principles established by Nima. First, he believed that like natural or conversational speech, poetry must convey the meaning; the number of words as well as the simplicity or complexity of the phraseology must be dictated by the requirement of the expression of the thought being expressed. In other words, he believed that the phrases expressing single thoughts do not have to be of the same length. Secondly rhythm, Naderpour believed, need not follow an established, monotonous form. Rather, like natural speech, it should be allowed to vary depending on the requirements of the thought structure being expressed. Thirdly, rhyme must appear at the end of each completed thought pattern. Rather than forced on thought segments, Naderpour believed, rhyme must serve as a unifier; it must join complete thought segments and present them as a cohesive expression of the poet's sentiments”. His poem, "Man with Two Shadows" is a good example of this, especially regarding his use of shadow, its intransigence vis-a-vis the sun and its profoundity vis-a-vis the night:

"A Man with Two Shadows" by Nader Naderpur, translated by Iraj Bashiri:

Standing amid a cold global sunset,
my shadow is cast
by the burning evening sun
which has, in turn,
gradually but carefully,
pulled it away
from beneath the feet of the mid-day sun.

But this elongated shadow
is not the creature that has
accompanied me from dawn to dusk
the creature that has led me from childhood to senility
that shadow was born to the morning light
this shadow is sired by the evening glow.

One day, when suddenly,
through the frame of my bright adolescence window
I discovered "future,"
golden and glowing,
that shadow, too, was born with the light
alongside that future
prepared to climb to the peak
I hurried from peak to peak
I rode, I felt, while
the rest of the world walked beside me.

But the appearance of noon
like light to which a film is exposed
destroyed my morning dreams of "future"
it destroyed all the shadows that graced the earth
the shadow that had accompanied me
(the shadow that had perished by the warmth of the sun)
that shadow alone was revived
and now,
in the fleeting sunlight of my life
standing amid the mud, it waits for the night
its face to the "past," its back is to the "future."

“Naderpour loved to talk about what was going on in Iran as long as you could talk on the same level." – Farhad Mafie (2000).

"Naderpour made it very easy and approachable for younger people who've been away from their culture. His death was the perfect definition of a tragedy." – Parastoo Izad Seta (2000)
