= Ruja (book) =

Collection of poems by Nima Yooshij

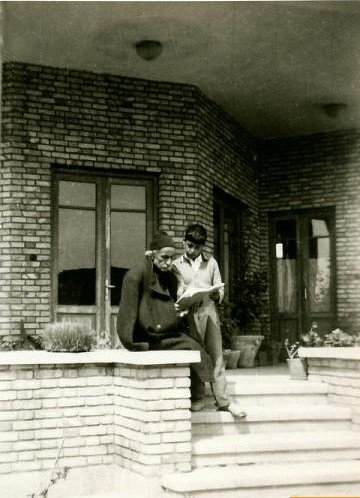
Nima Yooshij and his son Sharagim, 1947

Ruja (Mazanderani: روجا, romanized: Rujā, lit. 'The Red Star of Dawn') is a collection of poems by Nima Yooshij written in the Mazanderani language. Yoshij drew most of these works from local childhood poetry. The public space of some of The Red Star of Dawn's poems is influenced by the time of Nima Yooshij in Yush and its neighboring settlements, where post-constitutional modernity had not yet reached. His main concern was to preserve and revive Mazanderani language. He addresses this concern in his letters, manuscripts, and introduction to The Red Star of Dawn. In the letters he writes to his brother, he asks him to prepare and send him the history of Tabarestan and the divan of Amir Pazvari.

The Red Star of Dawn is written in Do-baytīs. This Do-baytīs is not related to a specific section of Yooshij's life, from the beginning of the poet's youth as he practiced poetry, to the end and peak of Nima's maturity, can be found in these two verses. Much of this Do-baytīs does not relate to the years of adolescence and youth in which he practiced poetry, and does not describe the burning and melting of love; Inspired by the symbols, institutions and coincidental events of the village of Yush, such as: a wedding, a sheep grazing, the birth of a cow... Nima is also mentioned in the biography of Safoura and an Armenian girl, his two failed loves, especially Safoura, whose fountain of poetry erupted and who is also present in Afsaneh.

== Writing and publication ==
Yoshij first announced his writing of a collection of poems in the Mazandaran language in 1947 at the Writers' Congress. It took four years to write this work, and according to Ahmad Shamlou, it had become a big part of Yooshij's life. It is very difficult and deadly to recite the poems of The Red Star of Dawn, which were published about thirty to forty years after Nima's death. Apart from the confusion of Yooshij's irregular writing, which he sometimes wrote on a cigarette box with a pencil. The lack of script and language was Tabari's standard, the variety of dialects and the lack of familiarity of collectors with the Kojori dialect, the passage of time and the rupture and erosion and corrosion of writings was problems in collection.

Thirty years after Yoshij's death, The Red Star of Dawn was first published by Sirus Tahabaz and apparently under the supervision of Yoshij's son, Sharagim, which was later denied for a number of reasons, which led to criticism. After that, two other collections of The Red Star of Dawn were published by two Mazandaran researchers. After that, Majid Asadi compiled a part of this collection and published it with a Persian translation, but received many negative reviews. Then Mohammad Azimi worked on the Tabari poems of Nima, who examined the poems in terms of phonetics, semantics and roots. Finally, in 2015, Adel Jahanarai collected and published all 415 Tabari poems by Nima Yoshij.
