= Mohammad Shams Langeroodi =

Iranian writer and academic (born 1950)

- محمد شمس لنگرودی
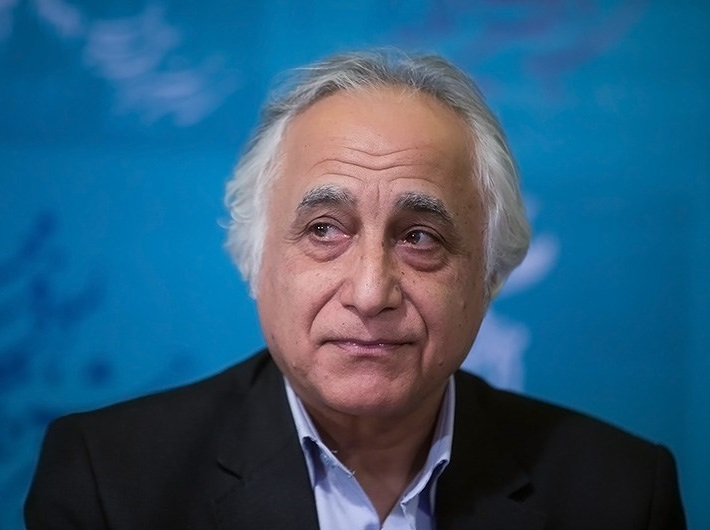
- Langeroodi in 2015
- Born: 1950 (age 75–76); Langarud, Iran
- Notable work: An Analytic History of Persian Modern Poetry (Encyclopedia); 53 Love Songs (Poetry and Spoken Words Album); Risk of Acid Rain (Film)

Mohammad Shams Langeroodi (Persian: محمد شمس لنگرودی; born November 17, 1950) is one of the most celebrated contemporary Iranian poet, actor, singer, author and university lecturer. He has researched extensively on different periods of Persian poetry, most famous of which has resulted in the book named An Analytic History of Persian Modern Poetry in four volumes. He is currently in the process of publishing his second novel.

== Life and early works ==
Shams Langeroodi was born in Langerood, Gilan, Iran as Mohammad Taghi Javaheri Gilani. Later his father changed their last name to Shams.
He published his first poetry book in 1976, but it wasn't until the 1980s that he established himself as one of the major poets of that decade when his poetry gained attention due to its novel imagery and surreal elements.
He currently lives in Tehran, Iran and is also the editor of Ahang-e Digar publications along with Hafez Mousavi and Shahab Mogharabin.

== An Analytic History of Persian Modern Poetry ==
Published in 1998 in four volumes, An Analytic History of Persian Modern Poetry was the first extensive research work done on the contemporary Persian poetry. It starts from 1905 and goes year by year describing the events in Iran's political and social scenes, poetry and criticism conditions, literary magazines and poetry books published each year along with selected reviews including a brief review by the author up until 1979. In order to focus on research Shams Langeroodi did not publish any poetry book for 10 years.

== Recent works ==
In his recent works, Shams Langeroodi has shown interest in a more simplistic approach to language. While imagery still plays a major part, simplicity and sarcasm are the new elements in his work that is engaged with Iran's social condition.

"We've reached from our hopeless Kafkaesque world to a Don Quixote-sque one."

Shams Langeroodi

It includes elements from mythology and religion to pop culture. An example to this is "Poem 36" from Gardener of Hell (2006).

You are late Moses!
The miracle era has passed
Grant your cane to Charlie Chaplin
So we have some laughs

== Bibliography ==
=== Poetry ===
- (رفتار تشنگی) Raftaar-e Teshnegi, 1976
- (در مهتابی دنیا) Dar Mahtaabi-e Donya, 1984
- (خاکستر و بانو) Khaakestar o Baanoo, 1986
- (جشن ناپیدا) Jashne Naapeyda, 1988
- (قصیده لبخند چاک چاک) Ghasideye Labkhand-e Chaak Chaak, 1990
- (نت‌های برای بلبل چوبی) Notes For A Wooden Nightingle, 2000
- (پنجاه و سه ترانه عاشقانه) Fifty Three Lovesongs, 2004
- (باغبان جهنم) Gardener of Hell, 2006
- (ملاح خیابان‌ها) Sailor of the Streets, 2008
- ‌Twenty-Two Elegies in the Month of Bollate; July (2009, published unofficially online), reflecting on the 2009 social movement
- Drawing your hands, 2010
- (می میرم به جرم آن که هنوز زنده بودم) I Shall Die for the Crime of Still Being Alive, 2010
- (و عجیب که شمس‌ام می‌خوانند) And Strangely They Call Me Shams, 2013
- (شب، نقاب عمومی است) Night Is A Public Mask, 2013
- (آوازهای فرشته ی بی بال) The Songs of A Wingless Angle, 2013
- (تعادل روز بر انگشتم) The Balance of the Day on My Fingers, 2013
- (شعر دوره بازگشت) The Rhymed Poem of Return, 2014
- (واژه ها به دیدن من آمدند) The Words Came to See Me, 2016
- (گتاب موسیقی) The Music: Poems in Appreciation of Instruments, 2018
- (قطار سفید)The White Train, 2021
- (رقص با گذرنامه جعلی) Dancing with the Fake Passport, 2024

=== Films ===
- (فلامینگو شماره ۱۳ ) Flamingo Number 13, 2010
- (پنج تا پنج) Five to Five, 2013
- (احتمال باران اسیدی) Risk of Acid Rain, 2015
- (دوباره زندگی) Life Again, 2018

=== Research works ===
- (گردباد شور جنون) Gerdbaade Shoor-e Jonoon (Hindi Style and Kalim Kaashaani), 1986
- (مکتب بازگشت) Maktab-e Baazgasht (Research on history and poetry of Afsharids, Zand and Qajar eras), 1993
- (تاریخ تحلیلی شعر نو) An Analytic History of Persian Modern Poetry (1905–1979) (in 4 Volumes), 1998
- (از جان گذشته به مقصود می‌رسد) Az Jaan Gozashte Be Maghsood Miresad (On Nima Yooshij), 2001

=== Novels ===
- (رژه بر خاک پوک) Reje Bar Khaak-e Pook, 1991
- (آنها که به خانه من آمدند) Those Who Came to My House, 2019

=== Essays ===
- (از دیگران شنیدن و از خود گفتن) Az Digaraan Shenidan o Az Khod Goftan, (not yet published)

=== Interviews ===
- (بازتاب زندگی ناتمام) Baaztaab-e Zendegi-e Naatamaam, 2007

== See also ==
List of Persian poets and authors
