= Winter (poem) =

Poem by Mehdi Akhavan Sales

Winter (Persian: زمستان) is the title of the most famous poem by Mehdi Akhavan Sales (1928–1990), the contemporary Iranian poet, which was published in 1956. It was composed in Persian and has been translated into some other languages. The poem has two layers: on the surface, the speaker is describing the chilly season, but more profoundly he is depicting the despair originating from political suppression in Iran; especially after the 1953 Iranian coup d'état.

== Musical Adaptation ==
The poem was performed by Mohammad Reza Shajarian in a concert in California in 2000. The music of the song was composed by Hossein Alizadeh. The recorded concert was published as an album the following year in Iran. The album was titled It's Winter echoing the last line of the poem.
