= Lavizan =

North-eastern neighborhood of Tehran, Iran

Coordinates: 35°46′N 51°30′E

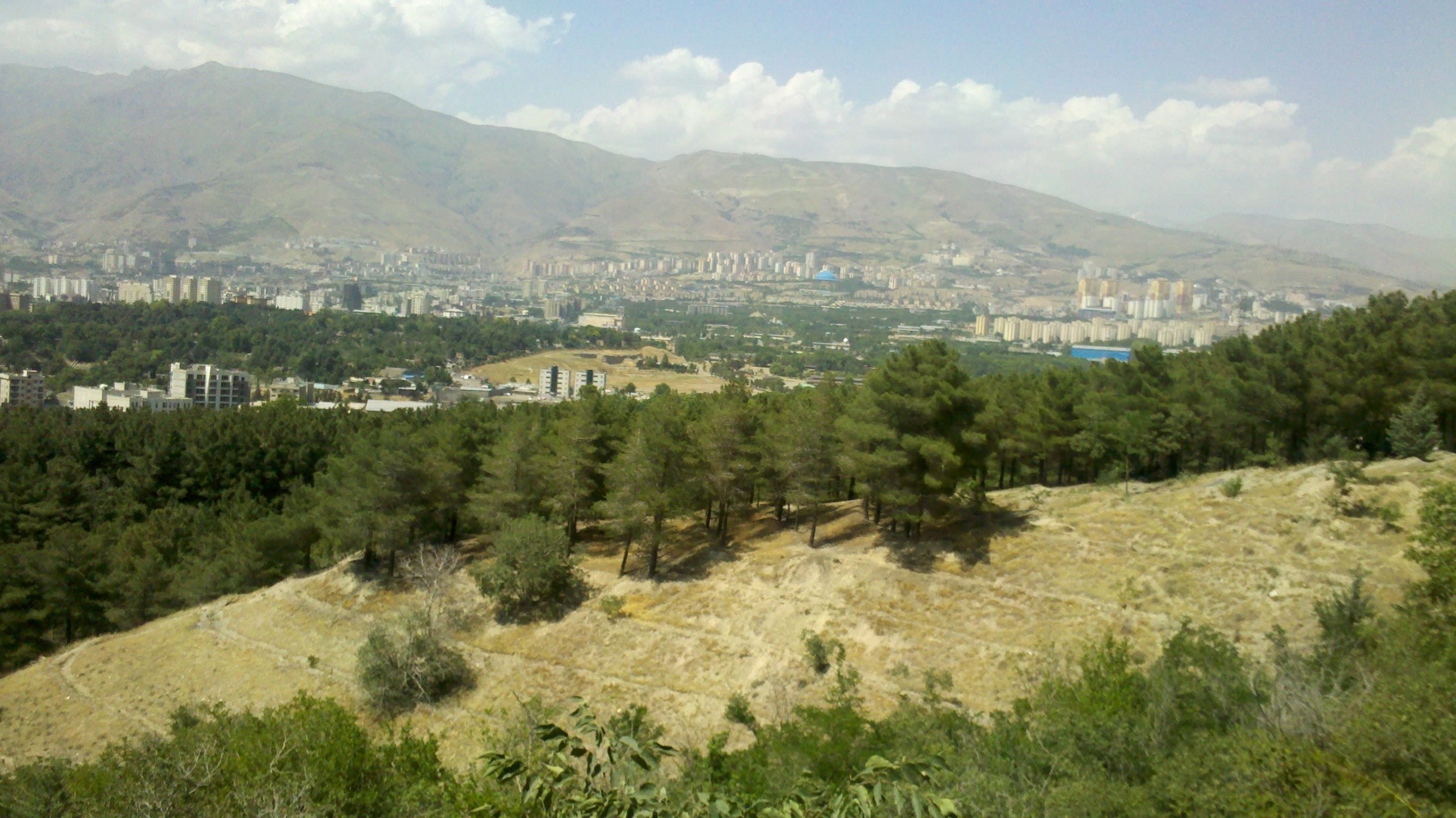
Lavizān Forest Park

Lavizān (Persian: لویزان) is a north-eastern neighborhood of Tehran, the capital of Iran.

Lavizān area consists of a residential area and forested recreation area called Lavizān Forest Park, as well as military sites. The neighborhoods surrounding Lavizan are Majidabad, Qanat-kosar, Qasemabad, Deh-e Narmak, Shian, Kuye Nobonyad, Ozgol and Qal'eue Sardar.

== Citizens ==
Local people in Lavizan live in apartments.

== Landmarks and urban areas ==
Lavizan Forest Park is recreation area, people from Lavizan and Tehran use it. The area size is about 1100 hectares. The neighborhoods surrounding Lavizan are Majidabad, Qanat-kosar, Qasemabad, Deh-e Narmak, Shian, Kuye Nobonyad, Ozgol and Qal'eue Sardar.

Shahid Rajaee University is the only higher-education center in this area. There are two schools located in lavizan, Adab and Shahidan-e-Rezaian.

== Military sites ==
There is a heavily fortified army garrison situated in Lavizān, and today also a nuclear site is said to be situated in the area.
