= Abdolali Dastgheib =

Iranian writer (born 1931)

Abdolali Dastgheib (Persian: عبدالعلی دست‌غیب; born November 7, 1931) is an Iranian literary critic, writer, translator and author of 66 books and numerous articles.

== Biography ==
Abdolali Dastgheib was born in Shiraz, Iran. His father (Javad) was a teacher and school principal and was later assigned as the head of the Department of Education in Firuzabad and Jahrom in Fars province. Following his school education in 1948, Abdolali enrolled in Teachers College (دانشسرای مقدماتی) in Shiraz and worked as a teacher for three years. He was taking part in street demonstrations against the Shah's regime in 1952 when he was arrested and jailed for one year. Abdolali worked as a notary public's assistance for two years and in the Health Department for three years. He then enrolled in the Higher Education College (دانشسرای عالی) in Tehran and completed a bachelor's degree in philosophy in 1961. Abdolali Dastgheib then started a career in education, teaching Persian literature and philosophy in high schools and colleges in his hometown of Shiraz as well as in Tehran.

Dastgheib picked up the love of books and reading as a schoolboy. He read extensively Iranian and foreign novels and became familiar with the world literature. Exposure to poor conditions in the rural areas opened his eyes to the inequalities suffered by people.

Dastgheib married in 1971 while working in Tehran. He has a son (Mohamad Javad=Pedram) and a daughter (Nakta) both living in Tehran.

== Publications ==
Abdolali Dastgheib started writing articles in literary magazines from a young age. His first article was published in Noor-e-Danesh magazine when he was 12 years old. His work as a literary critic started from the 1960s by publishing articles in literary magazines including Sokhan, Payam Novin and Ferdowsi. Dastgheib has written critics on famous Iranian poets and writers such as Nima Yooshij, Shamlou, Akhavan-Sales, Sepehri, Forough Farrokhzad, Sadegh Hedayat and Gholam-Hossein Sa'edi. Dastgheib has also played a role in introducing Western writers and philosophers such as Aristotle and Friedrich Nietzsche to the Iranian society through translations and critical reviews.

Abdolali Dastgheib became fascinated by the great Iranian poet of the 14th century, Hafiz and wrote extensively on his poetry. His major work on Hafiz covers two volumes titled Hafez-Shenakht حافظ‌شناخت (lit. 'Knowing Hafez'), and was published in 1998. In this and other publications, Dastgheib tries to cut through the superficial layers of the complicated poems of Hafiz and find the true meaning in his work.

Dastgheib is a respected figure in Persian literature. His extensive and long literary contribution has been recognised. He was selected as the Exemplary Critic by the Ministry of Culture in 1995 and was awarded an Appreciation Award and was named one of the Perennial Figures of Iran literature in 2003. More recently in 2016, Iranian Ministry of Culture recognised Dastgheib's long services to literature by giving him an Honorary award.

=== Some of Dastgheib's books on modern Iranian poets ===
- The Messenger of Hope and Liberty, Critical Review of poems by Nima Yooshij. 2006. Amitis Publishers, Tehran, Iran. ISBN 964-8787-12-3. (Persian title: پیام‌آور امید و آزادی)
- The Poet of Love and Dawn, Critical Review of poems by Ahmad Shamlou. 2006. Amitis Publishers, Tehran, Iran. ISBN 964-8787-10-7. (Persian: شاعر عشق و سپیده‌دمان)
- The Green Garden of Poetry, Critical Review of poems by Sohrab Sepehri. 2006. Amitis Publishers, Tehran, Iran. ISBN 964-8787-08-5. (Persian: باغ سبز شعر)
- The Poet of Defeat, Critical Review of poems by Mehdi Akhavan-Sales. 2006. Amitis Publishers, Tehran, Iran. ISBN 964-8787-11-5. (Persian: شاعر شکست)
- The Little Mermaid, Critical Review of poems by Forough Farrokhzad. 2006. Amitis Publishers, Tehran, Iran. ISBN 964-8787-09-3. (Persian: پری کوچک دریا)

=== Literary critics ===
- An Analysis of Modern Persian Poetry, Sā'eb Publishers, Tehran, 1966.
- Shades and Lights of Modern Persian Poetry, Farhang Publishers, Tehran, 1969.
- Critical Review of Nima Yooshij, Pāzand Publishers, Tehran, 1972.
- Critical Review of Gholam-Hossein Sa'edi, Chāpār Publishers, 1973.
- Critical Review of Ahmad Shamloo, Chāpār Publishers, 1973.
- Critical Review of Sadegh Chubak, Pāzand Publishers, 1974.
- Critical Review of Sadegh Hedayat, Pāzand Publishers, 1974.
- Critical Review of Mohammad-Ali Jamalzadeh, Chāpār Publishers, 1977.
- Critical Review of Ahmad Kasravi, Chāpār Publishers, 1978.
- Critical Review of M. A. Beh-Azin, Chāpār Publishers, 1978.
- Critical Review of Bozorg Alavi, Farzaneh Publishers, 1977.
- Critical Review of Jalal Al-e-Ahmad, Zharf Publishers, 1992.
- Critical Review of Mehdi Akhavan Saless, Morvarid Publishers, 1994.
- Towards Folklore Story Writing, Arts Corner, 1998.
- Critical Review of Mahmood Dowlat-Abadi, Imā Publishers, 1999.
- Critical Review of Ahmad Mahmood, Moeen Publishers, 1999.

=== Literary and historical investigations ===
- Writing Style, Sepehr Publishers, 1967.
- Arts and Reality, Sepehr Publishers, 1970.
- Existentialism Philosophies, Bamdad Publishers, 1975.
- The Artist and Cultural Past and Present, Agah Publishers, 1977.
- Contrasting Tendencies in Modern Persian Literature, Khonya Publishers, 1992.
- From Hafez to Goethe, Badie Publishers, 1995.
- Hafez Shenakht (Knowing Hafez), 2 vols., Elm Publishers, 1998.
- The Invasion of Mongols to Iran, Elm Publishers, 1998.
- In The Mirror of Critic, Arts Corner, 2000.
