= Afsaneh =

1923 poem by Nima Yooshij

- by Nima Yooshij
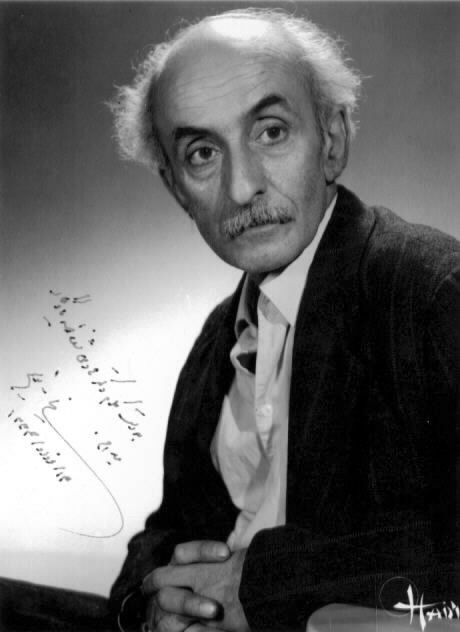
- Original title: افسانه
- Country: Iran
- Language: Persian
- Publication date: December 1923
- Lines: 103

"Afsaneh" (Persian: افسانه) is a poem by Nima Yooshij, published in December 1923 which is considered as the manifesto of She'r-e Nimaa'i. "Afsaneh" was very new in various aspects, including the way it was expressed and the texture, and led to the emergence of a new school of poetry in Iranian poetry. Nima Yoshij dedicated this poem to his teacher, Nizam Vafa.

What divides contemporary Iranian poetry into two periods before and after "Afsaneh" is not the meter and new rhythm experiences nor the variety of popular literature used in it, but the kind of narrative hidden in it that expresses the superior reality.

== Background ==
In 1910, the young Nima Yoshij, who had not yet changed his name at the time, went to study at St. Louis School in Tehran. During Yoshij's studies at that school, he learned French well and became acquainted with French romantic poets, including Lamartine. Along with French poetry, his teacher Nizam Vafa, who was also a poet, greatly influenced the intellectual development of Nima Yoshij. In 1919 he began writing poetry based on local legends of Mazandaran and storytelling French poetry. He later named the poem Afsaneh.

He gave part of Afsaneh to his friend Mirzadeh Eshghi to publish in his newspaper, Twentieth Century. The publication of Afsaneh provoked much opposition from the traditionalists and many accusations were leveled against him. Some time later, he published the poem in its entirety. In the first week, several newspapers criticized the poem. Poets like Mohammad Taghi Bahar immediately issued a statement against the poem.

== Themes ==
"Afsaneh" was one of the first narrative poems of Nima Yoshij, which consisted of two complete narratives and a number of fragmentary narratives. "Afsaneh" is not a single narrative; Rather, it is an argument between two sides of the dialogue that in some discourse essays, a story is narrated by mentioning a memory. For the first time in Iranian poetry, "Afsaneh" was very far from its predecessors in terms of form and content; Especially Nima Yoshij's great innovation in how to present personal intentions. Afsaneh is a kind of modern narrative. Unlike a work like Shahnameh, which consists of a large number of possessions and has a definite timeline, Afsaneh lacks a timeline. The storyline sometimes goes backwards, sometimes forwards. A series of separate narrative discourses that do not constitute a narrative as a whole; Rather, they complete the dialogue between two people, which is the main structure of the poem.

Afsaneh consists of a total of twenty-two speeches that are not narrated due to lack of story or plot and remain at the same level of speech:

What were they building in those mountains,
the hands of the people, polluted in mud?
Alas! From that moment on,
the residents did not get any results
Years went by ...
A runaway deer there,
stripped a branch of its leaves ...
Find other sounds ...
in The conical shape of a person's house ...
Herd of several goats in the pasture ...

— line 57

The second narration in Afsaneh is as follows:

The cold wind blows from outside.
The fire was burning in the heart of the hut
A girl suddenly came in
Who said, beating her breast:
- "O my heart, my heart, my heart!"
Sigh from a tired heart
fell on the ground and became cold
Such a heartless girl
Do you know what she did?
Mortal love, I am love

— line 60

Both narratives are old and frequent anecdotes. The first narrative is a successful narrative by providing a suitable space with images and without borders. In the second narrative, a childish story is told. Nima Yoshij was a nationalist, and his nationalist views are very evident in Afsaneh. Afsaneh is inspired by Mazandaran legends and all the atmosphere is reminiscent of the nature of Mazandaran.

== Legacy ==
Afsaneh is often referred to as the She'r-e Nimaa'i Manifesto because the foundations of She'r-e Nimaa'i were laid out in this poem. Afsaneh was a poem that made Nima Yoshij famous and made many people familiar with his thoughts and had a great impact on poets such as Ahmad Shamlou and Mehdi Akhavan Sales.
