= An Analytic History of Persian Modern Poetry =

1998 book by Shams Langeroodi

- Author: Mohammad Shams Langeroodi
- Original title: تاریخ تحلیلی شعر نو)
- Language: Persian
- Publication date: 1998

An Analytic History of Persian Modern Poetry (Persian: تاریخ تحلیلی شعر نو) is a research work on Persian contemporary poetry by Mohammad Shams Langeroodi, first published in 1998.

== Format ==
The book is in 4 volumes including the events in Iranian poetry from 1905 to 1979. It goes year by year starting with a brief description of political and social condition of the time following with a commentary on the literary criticism condition. A list of literary magazines and published poetry books is provided for each year. From each work, depending on its importance, it has a brief description, selected poems and includes different reviews.

Overall it includes seventy years of: bibliography of Persian modern poetry, Persian poetry publications (magazines, special issues, etc.) and a list of Persian poetry criticism.

Each volume covers the following years:

- Volume. 1: 1905–1953
- Volume. 2: 1953–1962
- Volume. 3: 1962–1970
- Volume. 4: 1970–1979

== Importance ==
An Analytic History of Persian Modern Poetry was the first major research work on the subject.

"Even if Shams Langeroodi hadn't done anything before, even if he would do nothing, this book is enough to keep his name in the Iranian literature history."

Hafez Mousavi
