= Yush, Mazandaran =

Village in Mazandaran province, Iran

Yush Persian: یوش
- Village
- Location within Iran
- Coordinates: 36°11′23″N 51°43′19″E
- Country: Iran
- Province: Mazandaran
- County: Nur
- District: Baladeh
- Rural District: Sheykh Fazlolah-e Nuri

Population (2016)
  - Total: 167
- Time zone: UTC+3:30 (IRST)

Yush (Persian: یوش) (Note: Also romanized as Yūsh) is a village in Sheykh Fazlolah-e Nuri Rural District of Baladeh District in Nur County, Mazandaran province, Iran.

Yush is the Alborz Mountains and is known as the birthplace of Nima Yooshij, an influential contemporary poet and the father of the new-era poem in Iran.

On 28 May 2004 at 17:08 local time (12:38 UTC), it was the epicenter of the 6.3 M_{w}Mazandaran-Qazvin earthquake, which left 35 dead and 400 injured.

== Demographics ==
=== Population ===
At the time of the 2006 National Census, the village's population was 154 in 57 households. The following census in 2011 counted 172 people in 70 households. The 2016 census measured the population of the village as 167 people in 69 households.
