= Quqnūs =

Poem by Nima Yooshij

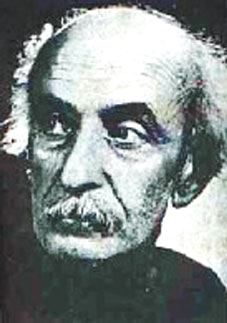
Nima Yooshij

Quqnūs (Persian: ققنوس, lit. 'The Phoenix') is a 1941 poem by Nima Yooshij. Quqnūs is often referred to as an evolved Afsaneh poem that depicts She'r-e Nimaa'i both in form (rhyme and paragraph) and in meaning (social symbolism). The poem describes a myth of Quqnūs: "It is said that Quqnūs lives a thousand years, and when a thousand years pass and his life comes to an end, he gathers a lot of firewood and sits on top of it and begins to compose and flutter his wings like fire from his wings, He falls into the wood and burns himself with the wood, but from the ashes of his corpse, his chickens come out." In fact, the poet uses an old myth and introduces himself as a Quqnūs that must burn in order for his thoughts and poems to be spread among the people and for other birds to spread it in the world.

== Context ==
The writing of "Quqnūs" first began in February 1938, and three years later was first published in the "Journal of Music" in 1941, in the midst of World War II and the occupation of Iran. The publication of Quqnūs and, shortly afterwards, the continuing articles entitled "The Value of Emotions in Artists' Lives" had a profound effect on the growth of She'r-e Nimaa'i. In Quqnūs, Nima Yoshij transforms his poetry and tends to social symbolism. Before that, his poems included romanticism, realism and symbolism. His social status at the time of Quqnūs's writing was coincided with the invasion of Iran and the subsequent political repression that greatly affected his morale.

== Structure ==
Quqnūs is an allegorical poem, Yoshij wants to convey that Phoenix does not have a safe place to live. His position is a weak branch that shakes in the wind at every moment. The birds sitting around him (but on other branches) are poets and intellectuals. In contrast, other birds are ordinary people or poets who live a normal life. Passing birds must be the same people on the street and in the bazaar. This birds's habitat is far from people. The poet is alone and alone. Moreover, the atmosphere of poetry is established at night and in the evening. The Lost Lamentations is not a poem composed of hundreds of distant voices (the voice of the people or the ancient poems of poets such as Attar and Khayyam, it should also be noted that in Persian mythology Phoenix is a bird from which music was taken). The imaginary building is his future poetry and style. The fire of a rural man (he also reminds Nima himself) is his wishes and hopes.

The first lines of “Quqnūs” show Nima's intervention on premodern Persian poetic form and give an early example of the style he would later outline in his comments to the Writer's Congress. Lines 3 and 4 stop midway through, but the first two usual poetic feet remain unaffected. While this is out of the ordinary, it only hints at the metrical experimentation to come. Lines 9 and 10 break with the norm in the jarring string of five long syllables, ending with builds, in which the normally short final syllable of the first foot lengthens, incorporating the first letter of the next theoretical foot, which is not present in the line. The plodding succession of syllables in builds, encapsulates Nima's idea of poetic modernism in a single word. At the same moment the poet creates something new, he also destroys its source, or—at the very least—shakes its foundations. In line 10, metrics and content stand at odds with each other, and their dissonance sounds out the inner workings of Nima's poetry. This single word, builds, displays Nima's modernist poetics within itself by making a claim to building something new while simultaneously breaking away from the premodern metrical foundations of Persian prosody.

“The Phoenix, sweet-singing bird, known across the world” with Attar's “The Phoenix is a peerless bird, heart-enrapturing // This bird’s abode is Hindustan” is a hear the sonic relationship between the two lines. While Nima does not engage in a poetic imitation by copying Attar's meter, he does reference his predecessor in his rhyme. The intertextual reference offers us a key to unlock the processes behind Nima's modernist poetry, for the poem betrays its secrets through its intertextuality. The far-off voices that the Phoenix recombines in what is ostensibly new poetry are echoes of the Persian poetic tradition. They are echoes of premodern prosodic, rhythmic forms. In the end the poet-phoenix's immeasurable pain erupts in his own destruction. “drunk from his invisible pains, / he throws himself on the awesome fire. / A violent wind blows, and the bird is burned up.” But in the final two lines, Nima breaks away from Attar's version (and other familiar stories of the Phoenix), for usually only a single new Phoenix rises out of the ashes. Instead, in “Quqnūs” “the ashes of his body are collected up, / his chicks take flight from the heart of his ashes.” The difference with Attar's poem, leaving the reader to draw particular conclusions about Nima's decision to use a plural. Considering that “Quqnūs” comes early in Nima's development of metrical form, the final line represents his hope that other poets might later continue the innovations he was making in Persian poetry.
