= Adab School =

Adab Educational Complex
- موقوفه فرهنگی ادب

Location
- Shah Rezaee St. pasdaran Lavizan; Tehran; Iran
- Coordinates: 35°37′11″N 51°29′22″E

Information
- School type: private Private school
- Established: 1982
- Founder: G.R. Tanhaa, Moghaddasin, H. Rabbani Shirdel and Mortazavi
- Status: Active
- President: Alireza Zarrin
- Chairperson: Alireza zarrin, sasan Esmaeili, Mr lotfi
- Administrator: saeed zibadel
- Director: saeed zibadel
- Principal: Sasan esmaeili . Ali kazemi
- Head of school: Alireza Zarrin
- Head teacher: sasan esmaili
- Adab complex: Sasan Esmaeili
- Staff: up to 100
- Teaching staff: General studies, Mathematics and Physics, Natural science٬Humanities
- Grades: kindergarten to high school
- Gender: Male only
- Age range: 5-18
- Classes: 20
- Average class size: 15 to 25 person per class
- Education system: private school educational system
- Hours in school day: 7:30 a.m. to 8 p.m.
- Classrooms: up to 30
- Houses: 5
- Colour: Pale blue
- Athletics: football, volleyball, basketball, table tennis
- Sports: Soccer, volleyball, table tennis, basketball
- Team name: adab sprot
- USNWR ranking: top 10
- National ranking: One of the high-quality private schools in iran
- Website: http://adab.sch.ir

The Adab Educational Complex ( موقوفه ی فرهنگی ادب) is a private school in the Lavizan neighborhood of Tehran, Iran.

== History ==
The Adab school was founded in 1982. In 2009 new teachers and presidents (from Soroush High School) entered.

== Campus ==
The campus of Adab is located on Lavizan, on the east side of Tehran, Iran. The campus consists of three main buildings:

- School building
- Playground
- Extracurricular-dedicated (ادب پس از مدرسه)

=== School building ===
The school building of Adab is divided into three sub-buildings. The sub-buildings are:

- Middle school
- Elementary school
- High school

All of the sub-buildings have three floors above-ground and one shared basement.

=== The playground ===
The playground is an asphalt-covered ground with a roof yet open-air.

=== Extracurricular-dedicated ===
The extracurricular-dedicated building of Adab is located on the northwest of the campus. It is called "Adab pas az madrese (ادب پس از مدرسه)" which means "Adab post school" in Persian. The building has four floors:

- Groundfloor: Office and Security room
- 1st floor: Library and Gamenet
- 2nd floor: Studyroom and Lab
- 3rd floor: Gym

=== Age 26 ===
The 26th set of students entered the ninth grade are known as "age 26" (2024) (Persian: "دوره ی بیست و ششم").
