= Nima Yooshij =

Iranian modern poet (1895–1960)

- نیما یوشیج
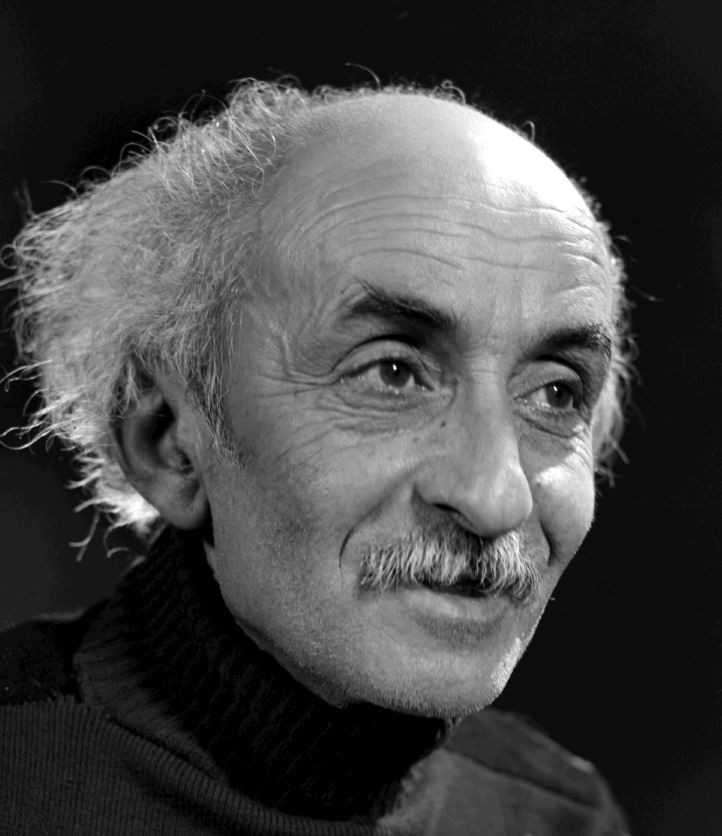
- Born: Ali Esfandiari; 11 November 1895; Yush, Nur, Mazandaran, Sublime State of Iran
- Died: 4 January 1960 (aged 64); Shemiran, Tehran, Iran
- Resting place: Imamzadeh Abdollah, Ray (until 2007); Nima's House, Yush (from 2007)
- Writing career
- Pen name: Nima
- Language: Persian
- Genre: Modernist poetry
- Notable works: Afsaneh, Quqnūs, The Red Star of Dawn
- Literary movement: She'r-e Nimaa'i

Nima Yooshij or Nimā Yushij (Persian: نیما یوشیج; 11 November 1895 – 6 January 1960), also called Nimā (نیما), born Ali Esfandiari (علی اسفندیاری), was a prominent Iranian poet. He is famous for his style of poetry which he popularised, called she'r-e now (شعر نو, lit. "new poetry"), also known as She'r-e Nimaa'i (شعر نیمایی, lit "Nima poetry") in his honour after his death. He is considered the father of modern Persian poetry.

He died of pneumonia in Shemiran, northern Tehran. Following his will, he was buried in his native village of Yush, Nur County, Mazandaran.

== Early life ==
He was the eldest son of Ibrahim Nuri of Yush (a village in Baladeh, Nur County, Mazandaran province). He was a Tabarian, but also had Georgian roots on his maternal side. He grew up in Yush, mostly helping his father with the farm and taking care of the cattle. As a boy, he visited many local summer and winter camps and mingled with shepherds and itinerant workers. Images of life around the campfire, especially those emerging from the shepherds' simple and entertaining stories about village and tribal conflicts, impressed him greatly. These images, etched in the young poet's memory waited until his power of diction developed sufficiently to release them.

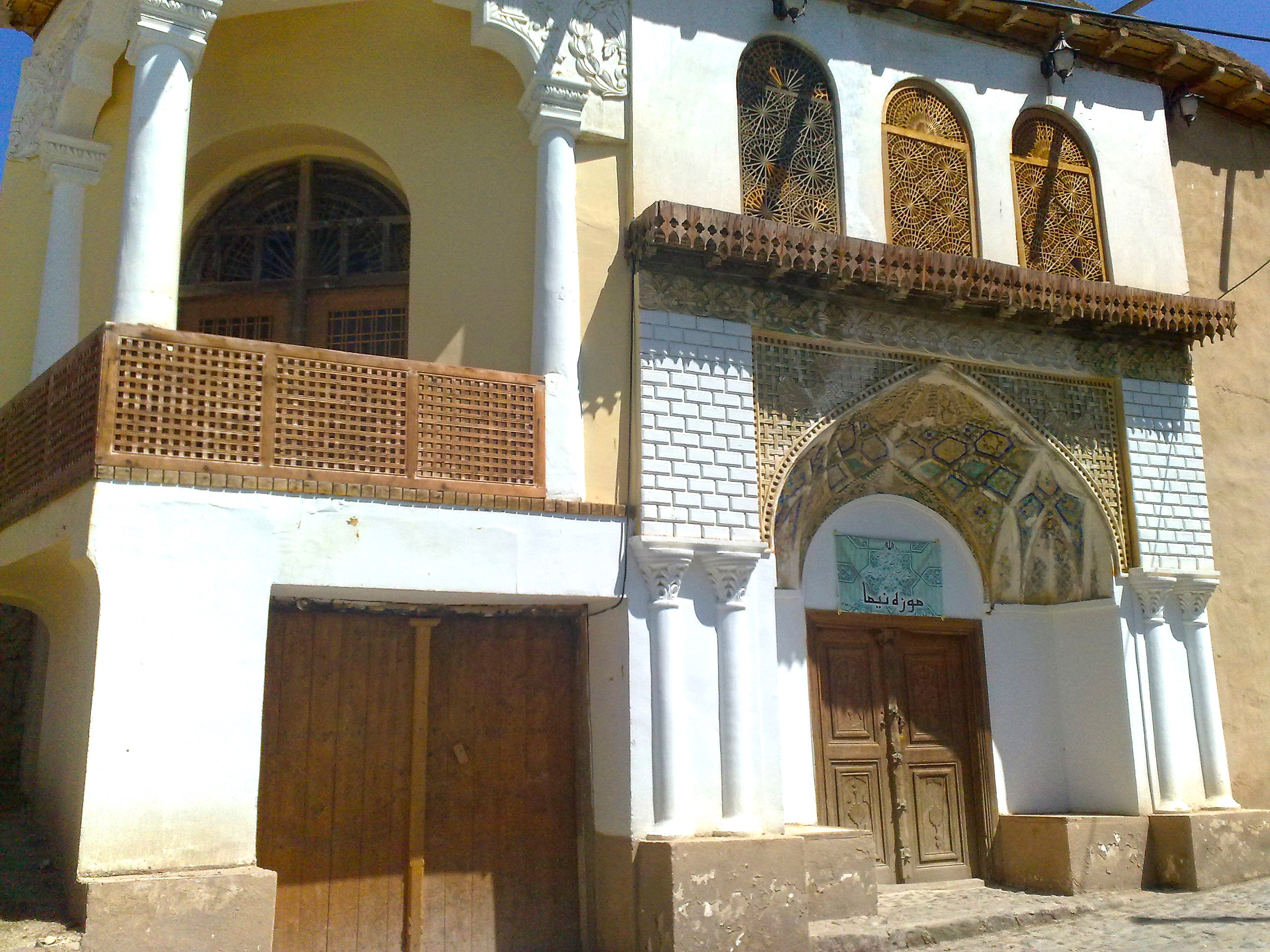
Nima Yooshij's house, Yush

Nima's early education took place in a maktab. He was a truant student and the mullah (teacher) often had to seek him out in the streets, drag him to school, and punish him. At the age of twelve, Nima was taken to Tehran and registered at the St. Louis School. The atmosphere at the Roman Catholic school did not change Nima's ways, but the instructions of a thoughtful teacher did. Nezam Vafa, a major poet himself, took the budding poet under his wing and nurtured his poetic talent.

Instruction at the Catholic school was in direct contrast to instruction at the maktab. Similarly, living among the urban people was at variance with life among the tribal and rural peoples of the north. In addition, both these lifestyles differed greatly from the description of the lifestyle about which he read in his books or listened to in class. Although it did not change his attachment to tradition, the difference set fire to young Nima's imagination. In other words, even though Nima continued to write poetry in the tradition of Saadi and Hafez for quite some time his expression was being affected gradually and steadily. Eventually, the impact of the new overpowered the tenacity of tradition and led Nima down a new path. Consequently, Nima began to replace the familiar devices that he felt were impeding the free flow of ideas with innovative, even though less familiar devices that enhanced a free flow of concepts. "Ay Shab" (O Night) and "Afsaneh" (Myth) belong to this transitional period in the poet's life (1922).

== Emergence as a poet ==
Nima first came to public attention in 1921 when he published the long poem The Tale of the Pale-Colored One (Qesse-ye Rang Parideh), composed the year before, in the weekly newspaper The Twentieth Century edited by Mirzadeh Eshghi. The poem provoked sharp criticism from prominent traditionalist poets, including Malek o-Sho'arā Bahar and Mehdi Hamidi Shirazi, who mocked him for departing from classical conventions. Literary critic Abdolali Dastgheib later argued that even in his early poems—written largely within traditional forms—Nima displayed an originality of thought and introduced themes that were strikingly new.

In the autumn of 1922, Nima published the poem “O Night” (Ey Shab) in the weekly newspaper Nowbahar. Reflecting on this period, he later wrote: “In the autumn of 1922, I saw ‘O Night,’ another example of my work—written earlier, was passed around but repeatedly rejected—printed in the weekly Nowbahar.” Each of these early pieces was, especially at the time, a pointed challenge to the defenders of classical poetry.

After a period of teaching at various schools—including the Tehran Polytechnic—Nima also collaborated with journals such as Majalle-ye Musiqi and Majalle-ye Kavir. His poetic revolution is widely understood to have begun with the publication of “The Phoenix” (Qoqnoos, February 1938) and “The Crow” (Ghorāb, October 1938), both printed in the state-sponsored journal Musiqi.

During the journal’s publication years (1939–1940), Musiqi continued to print his more mature works. In addition to earlier poems such as “The Sound of the Harp,” “The Swan,” “The Boatman’s Candle,” and “The Realm Without Form” from the 1920s, the journal featured his later compositions from 1937–1939, including “Moonlit Blossom,” “The Phoenix,” “Bird of Sorrow,” “The Fairies,” “The Spider’s Hue,” and “The Cold Laughter.”

Over the course of his sixty-four years, Nima succeeded in transforming the millennium-old norms of Persian poetry—rules long regarded as fixed, sacred, and immutable—laying the foundations for what would become modern Persian verse.

== Contributions ==
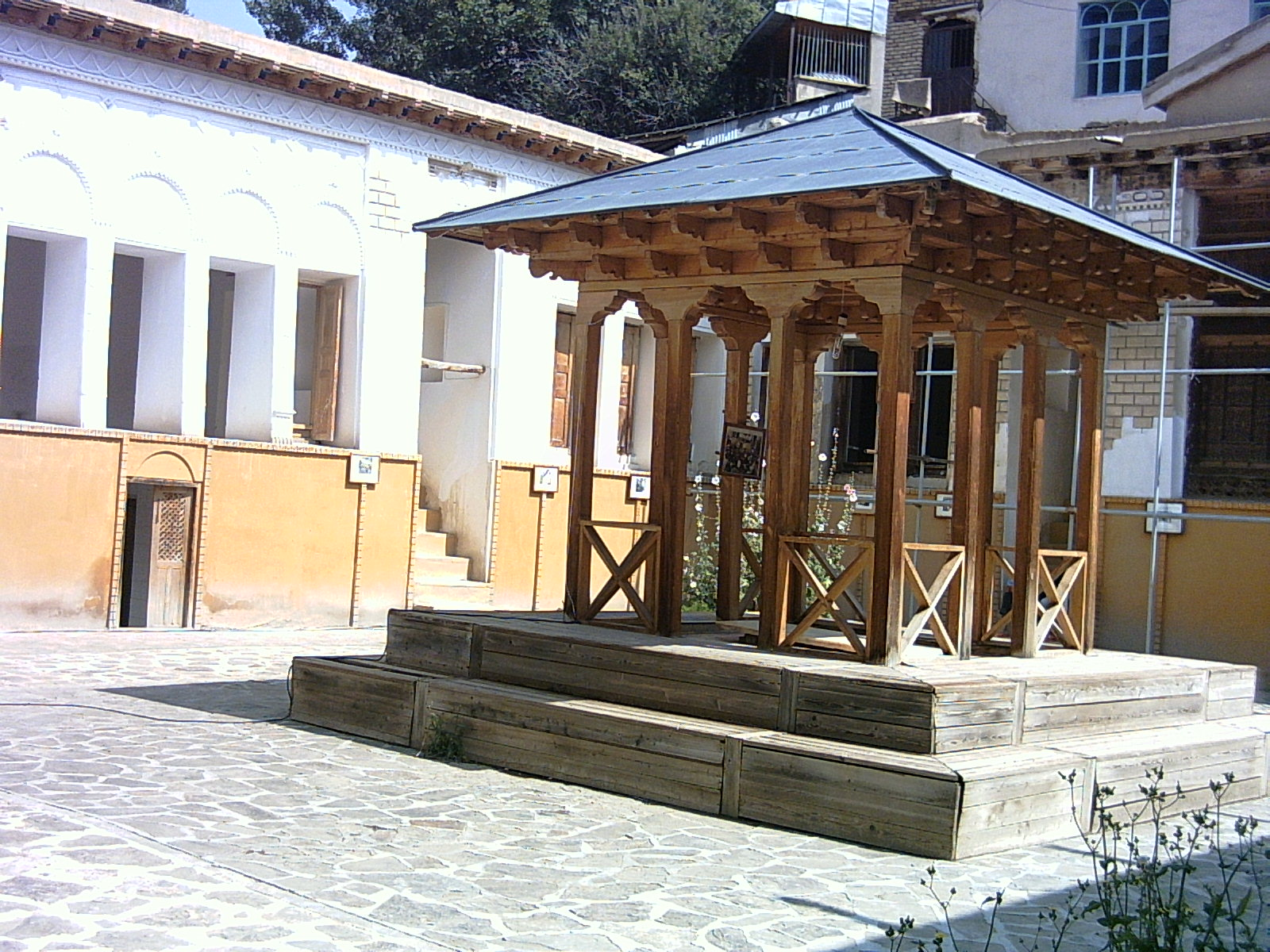
Tomb of Nima Yushij, Yush

In general, Nima reformed the rhythm and allowed the length of the line to be determined by the depth of the thought being expressed rather than by the conventional Persian meters that had dictated the length of a bayt (verse) since the early days of Persian poetry. Furthermore, he emphasized current issues, especially the nuances of oppression and suffering, at the expense of the beloved's moon face or the ever-growing conflict between the lovers, the beloved, and the rival. In other words, Nima realized that while some readers were enthused by the charms of the lover and the coquettish ways of the beloved, the majority preferred heroes with whom they could identify. Nima actually wrote quite a few poems in the traditional Persian poetry style and as critiqued by Abdolali Dastgheib, showed his ability well. However, he felt the old ways limit his freedom to express his deep feelings or important issues faced by society. This led him to break free and create a whole new style for modern poetry.

Furthermore, Nima enhanced his images with personifications that were very different from the "frozen" imagery of the moon, the rose garden, and the tavern. His unconventional poetic diction took poetry out of the rituals of the court and placed it squarely among the masses. The natural speech of the masses necessarily added local color and flavor to his compositions. Lastly, and by far Nima's most dramatic element was the application of symbolism. His use of symbols was different from the masters in that he based the structural integrity of his creations on the steady development of the symbols incorporated. In this sense, Nima's poetry could be read as a dialogue among two or three symbolic references building up into a cohesive semantic unit. In the past only Hafez had attempted such creations in his Sufic ghazals. The basic device he employed, however, was thematic, rather than symbolic unity. Symbolism, although the avenue for the resolution of the most enigmatic of his ghazals, plays a secondary role in the structural makeup of the composition.

== Works ==
The venues in which Nima published his works are noteworthy. In the early years when the press was controlled by the government, Nima's poetry, deemed below the established norm, was not allowed publication. For this reason, many of Nima's early poems did not reach the public until the late 1930s. After the forced abdication of Reza Shah, Nima became a member of the editorial board of the "Music" magazine. Working with Sadegh Hedayat, he published many of his poems in that magazine. Only on two occasions he published his works at his own expense: "The Pale Story" and "The Soldier's Family."

The closing of "Music" coincided with the formation of the Tudeh Party and the appearance of a number of leftist publications. Radical in nature, Nima was attracted to the new papers and published many of his groundbreaking compositions in them.

Ahmad Zia Hashtroudy and Abolghasem Jannati Ataei are among the first scholars to have worked on Nima's life and works. The former included Nima's works in an anthology entitled "Contemporary Writers and Poets" (1923). The selections presented were: "Afsaneh," (Myth) "Ay Shab" (O Night), "Mahbass" (Prison), and four short stories.

=== References ===
In his former band Radio Tehran, Ali Azimi used one of Nima's poems titled "When Crying Begins" as part of the hit song "Tamume Chiza (Everything)".

== Literary style ==
Nima Yushij is regarded as the father of modern Persian poetry. He pioneered a new poetic school called Sheʿr-e Nimaʾi (Nimaic verse), also known in English as New Poetry or Nimaic free verse. Nimaic verse deliberately breaks the rigid patterns of classical Persian poetry. Whereas traditional verse relied on the quantitative ʿarūż system of fixed meters and couplets (beyts) with uniform length and mandatory rhyme, Nima introduced irregular verse paragraphs of varying line-lengths and flexible rhyme. In Nima’s words, each poem may use one metrical pattern (as in classical practice) but allow “quality” of feet to remain fixed while “quantity” (the number of feet per line) varies freely.

=== Influence ===
Nima’s innovations had an immediate and enduring impact on Persian poetry. As Iranica notes, "Nimaic verse has had indisputable and unprecedented impact on the style of many Iranian poets", from highly experimental younger writers to mainstream modernists. In particular, most major mid-century Iranian poets adopted elements of Nimaic verse. Notables include Mehdi Akhavan-e Saless (M. Omid) (1928–1990) and Ahmad Shamlou (1925–2000), who employed freer metrics and symbolic imagery; Forough Farrokhzad (1935–1967), whose powerful female voice and unrhymed lyrics clearly echo Nima’s example; and Siavash Kasraʾi, Sohrab Sepehri, Nader Naderpour, Houshang Ebtehāj (Sāyâ), Mohammad-Reza Shafii Kadkani and others. Younger poets and critics continued to regard Nima’s approach as a starting point for modernism. His influence also spread beyond Iran: for instance, the Afghan poet Wāsef Bakhtari (b. 1942) was directly inspired by Nimaic verse, and literary historians note that in Afghanistan Nima’s style “resulted in the dominant formation of contemporary [Afghan] literature and culture”.

== See also ==
- Persian literature
- Intellectual Movements in Iran
- Khalilollah Khalili
- Mehdi Akhavan Sales

== Other sources ==
- Essays on Nima Yushij: Animating Modernism in Persian Poetry, edited by Ahmad Karimi-Hakkak and Kamran Talattof. Leiden: Brill, 2004.
- Dastgheib, Abdolali. 2006. The Messenger of Hope and Liberty: Critical Review of Poems by Nima Yooshij. 2006. Amitis Publishers, Tehran, Iran. ISBN 964-8787-12-3. (Persian title: پیام‌آور امید و آزادی)
