= Ahmadreza Ahmadi =

Iranian poet and screenwriter (1940–2023)

- احمدرضا احمدی
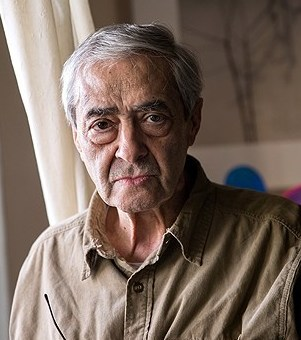
- Ahmadi in 2013
- Born: 20 May 1940; Kerman, Iran
- Died: 11 July 2023 (aged 83); Tehran, Iran
- Education: Dar ul-Funun
- Occupations: Poet, Screenwriter
- Years active: 1961–2023
- Spouse: Shohreh Heydari (m. 1982)
- Children: 1

Ahmadreza Ahmadi (20 May 1940 – 11 July 2023; Persian: احمدرضا احمدی) was a eminent Iranian modern poet and screenwriter, renowned as a significant figure in Iran's "New Wave poetry movement."

Ahmadi was born on May 20, 1940, in Kerman, Iran. His family relocated to Tehran in 1948, where he pursued his education. In Tehran, he initially attended the "Adab" school (Persian: ادب), and in 1954, he enrolled at Dar ol-Fonoun. Influential figures in his early literary development included his maternal nephew, writer Abdorrahim Ahmadi, and his teacher at Dar ol-Fonoun, Mohammad Shirvāni.

Ahmadi's debut poetry collection, Tarh (Persian: طرح, meaning 'Sketch'), was published in 1962. His poetic style was deeply influenced by French Surrealism and the American Imagist movement, drawing inspiration from poets such as Saint John Perse, Paul Éluard, Louis Aragon, and Ezra Pound.

Ahmadreza Ahmadi died on July 11, 2023, at the age of 83. His contributions to Iranian literature and the New Wave poetry movement remain influential and celebrated.
