= Sohrab Sepehri =

Iranian poet and painter (1928–1980)

- سهراب سپهری
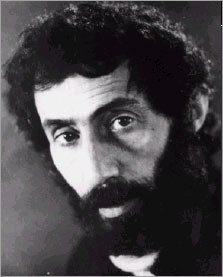
- Sepehri in 1975
- Born: October 7, 1928; Qom, Imperial State of Iran
- Died: April 21, 1980 (aged 51); Tehran, Iran
- Resting place: Mashhad-e Ardahal, Iran
- Education: University of Tehran
- Occupations: poet, painter, and translator
- Relatives: Mohammad Taqi Sepehr (great-grandfather)

Sohrab Sepehri (7 October 1928 – 21 April 1980; Persian: سهراب سپهری) was an Iranian poet and painter, who alongside Nima Youshij, Ahmad Shamlou, Mehdi Akhavan-Sales, and Forough Farrokhzad is considered one of the most important figures in modern Persian poetry.

== Biography ==
According to Sepehri, he was born in Qom, Iran, and moved to his family's hometown Kashan at a young age. His father, a painter and tar player, worked for the post office and was paralyzed while Sepehri was a child leaving his mother to support the family. His maternal grandmother Hamideh Sepheri, also a published poet, was the daughter of the Qajar court historian Mohammad Taqi Sepehr.

He completed his elementary and secondary education in Kashan and moved to Tehran in 1943 to study at a teachers' college. He worked as a teacher for a few years, then enrolled as a student in the Faculty of Fine Arts at the University of Tehran and graduated with honors. After finishing his education, he was employed in an oil company, which he left after 8 months. He soon published his first collection of poems named "The Death of Color", followed by a second collection, "Life Sleeps".

Sepehri was an avid traveler who travelled to many European countries as well as east to Pakistan, India, China, and Japan. While in Japan and China he took interest in the poetry and visual arts of those countries. In particular, he studied woodblock printing with Un'ichi Hiratsuka. He would later go on to publish Persian translations of Japanese and Chinese poetry. In Paris, he enrolled in a lithography course at the school of Fine Arts.

In 1979 he was diagnosed with leukemia and moved to England for treatment. He later returned to Tehran where he died in Pars Hospital on April 21, 1980. He was buried in Mashhad-e Ardahal, a village west of his native Kashan. His grave remains frequently visited by many of Sepheri's admirers.

== Poetry ==
Well-versed in Buddhism, mysticism, and Western traditions, he blended the Eastern concepts with Western techniques, thereby creating a kind of poetry unprecedented in the history of Persian literature. He had his own style of writing poetry, using short sentences rather than long ones, the latter having been frequently used in Persian poetry for centuries. In one of his works called 'Footsteps of Water' or 'The Water's Footfall', Sepehri introduces himself, his family, and his way of thinking in a poetic form.

Abdolali Dastgheib, acclaimed literary critic and writer, believes that Sepehri reached great levels in poetic language following the publication of his later books such as 'The Water's Footfall', 'Traveller' and 'The Green Volume'. There are many examples of personifications, or symbols in his poetry. In his poem "Let's not Spoil the Water", he talks about water, the necessary and basic element of life which people must keep clean. He used a special symbolism in these poems that makes the objects talk to the reader, rather than describing those objects.

The first known translation into English of Sepehri's long poem, Seday-e Pay-e Ab (صدای پای آب) by Abbas Faiz and Martin Turner was published as "Water's Footfall" by Cambridge University Press in 1986.

An English translation by Ali Salami of some of Sepehri's poems was published in 2003.

== Legacy ==
Abbas Kiarostami's 1987 drama film Where is the Friend's House? title is taken from a verse of Sepheri's poem Neshani.

Some of his paintings are held in the collections of the Tehran Museum of Contemporary Art and the Metropolitan Museum of Art.

== Works ==
- Hasht Ketab (Eight Books) 1976
- The Death of Color 1951
- The Life of Dreams 1953
- Us nil, us a look Was not published until 1977
- Downpour of Sunshine 1958
- East of Sorrow 1961
- The Wayfarer 1966
- The Green Space 1967 (A poem from The Oasis of Now (1965) translated by Kazim Ali with Mohammad Jafar Mahallati, BOA Editions, 2013.)

== See also ==
- Iranian art
- Islamic art
- Islamic calligraphy
- List of Iranian artists

== links ==
Media related to Sohrab Sepehri at Wikimedia Commons

- Sohrab Sepehri Official Website: Biography, Poems, Paintings and anythings about Sohrab Sepehri
- Sohrab Sepehri in Persian Language
- Sohrab-Sepehri: Containing Biography, selected works and much more
- A Tribute to Sohrab Sepehri
- About Sohrab Sepehri
- The Second Sohrab Sepehri National Award Held in Kashan
- Sohrab Sepehri's Official Facebook Page
