= Fereydoon Moshiri =

Persian poet

Fereydoon Moshiri فریدون مشیری
- Born: September 21, 1926; Tehran, Iran
- Died: October 24, 2000 (aged 74); Tehran, Iran
- Occupation: Poet
- Spouse: Eghbal Akhavan-Zanjani (1955–2000, his death)
- Children: Bahar; Babak
- Relatives: Ebrahim Moshiri Afshar (father); Manoucher Moshiri (Brother); Mansour Moshiri (Brother); Khorshid al-Saltaneh (Mother)
- Website: Official website of Fereydoon Moshiri

Fereydoon Moshiri (September 21, 1926 – October 24, 2000; Persian: فریدون مشیری) was one of the prominent contemporary Persian poets who wrote poems in both modern and classic styles of the Persian poem.

A selection of his poems has been translated into English entitled With All my Tears by Ali Salami. Some of his other published works are as follows:

- 1957, Gonah-e Darya (The Sin of the Sea)
- 1958, Nayafteh (Undiscovered)
- 1960, Abr (The Cloud)
- 1970, Parvaz Ba Khorshid (Flying With the Sun)
- 1978, Bahar ra Bavar Kon (Believe the Spring)
- 1988, Ah Baran (Oh, the Rain)
- 2001, Ta Sobh-e Tabnak-e Ahura'ii (Until the Bright of Ahuric Dawn)

== Early Life and Family ==
Fereydoon had two brothers, Manoucher and Mansour Moshiri. They were born to Khorshid al-Sataneh, a descendant of Fath Ali Shah Qajar, and Ebrahim Moshiri Afshar, who traced their lineage to Nader Shah Afshar.His maternal grandfather was Mirza Javad Khan Mo'tamen al-Mamalek, who served in the Majlis and wrote poetry as well under the pan name "Najm". Ebrahim's family was heavily involved within the Hamadan Post and Telegram Service, where he would begin his professional career.Moshiri spent his childhood in Mashhad, where he attended Hemmat School and Shah Reza Secondary School. After returning to Tehran, he continued his education at Dar ul-Funun and Adib High School.

== Journalism and Literary Career ==
Moshiri began working for the Ministry of Post and Telegraph in 1945. He became involved in literary journalism, contributing to publications such as "Sokhan", "Sepid o Siah", and "Roshanfekr". Between 1953 and 1972, he edited the cultural pages of "roshanfekr", where he helped introduce the poetry of emerging writers, including Forugh Farrokhzad and Manoucher Atashi.

== Poetry and Literary Reception ==
Moshiri's first poetry collection, "Teshne-ye Tufan", appeated in 1955. His subsequent collection, "Gonah-eDarya" (1956), provked a debate involving Nader Naderpour and Abdol-Mohammad Ayati. Moshiri's poetry combined traditional forms of Persian prose with modern verse, particularly the metrical innovations associated with Nima Yushij. His poem "Kucheh" ("The Alley") became one of his best known works.

His work has been associated with the moderate movement in Persian poetry, which sought to retain elements of classical poetic expression, while introducing modern subjects and forms.

== Last years ==
Fereydoon Moshiri had been suffering from leukaemia and kidney failure for five years and died in "Tehran Clinic" hospital on October 24, 2000, at the age of 74.
