= Ahmad Karimi-Hakkak =

Persian literary figure

- احمد کریمی حکاک
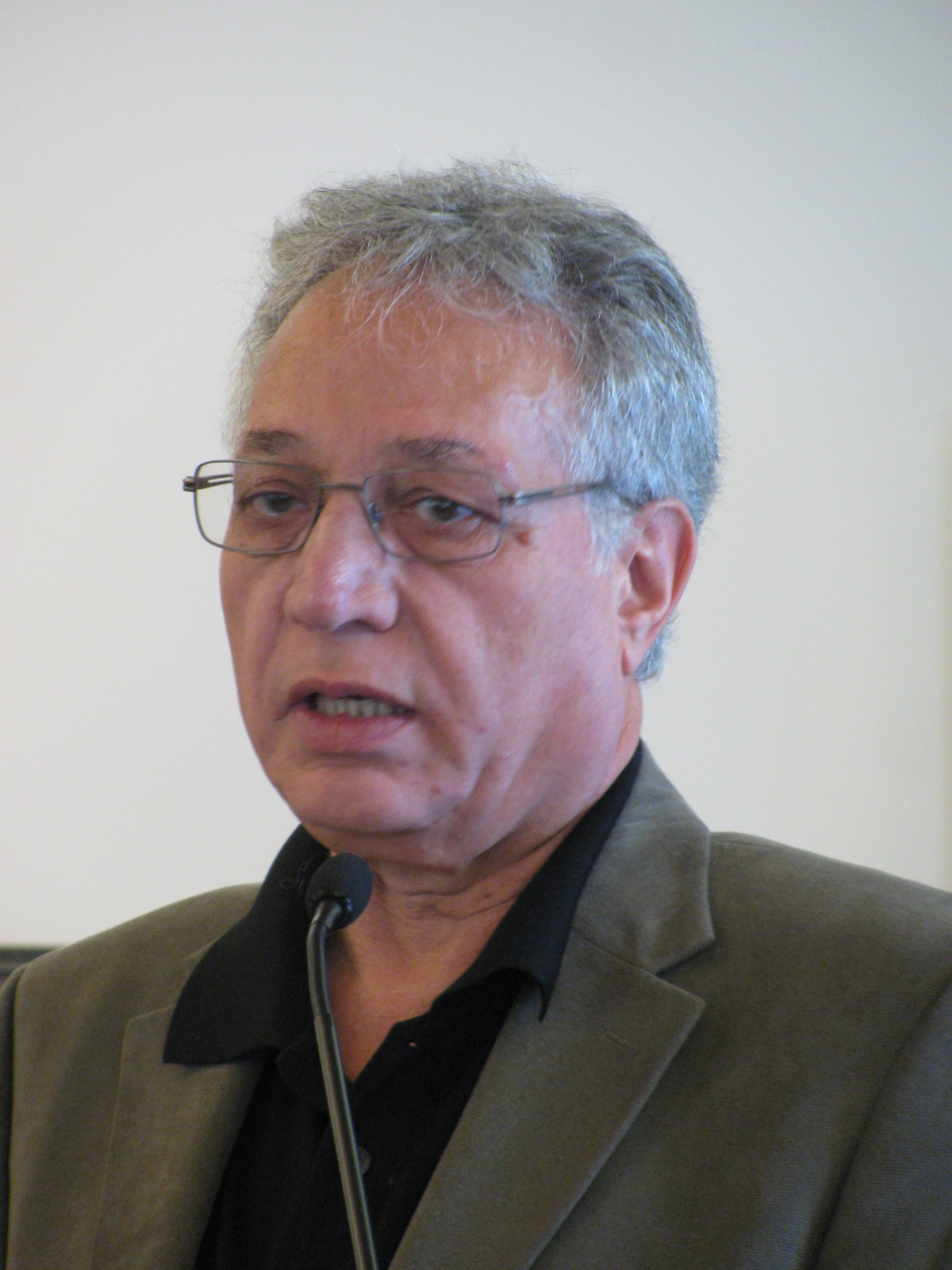
- Born: February 6, 1944 (age 82); Mashhad, Iran
- Occupation: Professor
- Known for: Persian literature, Iranian studies

Ahmad Karimi-Hakkak (Persian: احمد کریمی حکاک, born February 6, 1944 in Mashhad, Iran) is a Persian literary figure and Iranologist.

== Life ==
=== Education ===
Ahmad Karimi-Hakkak holds a BA in English Literature and a Teacher's Certificate from the University of Tehran and Military University, Tehran, respectively. He got an MA in English Literature from the University of Missouri-Kansas City and a PhD in Comparative Literature from Rutgers University.

=== Career ===
Ahmad Karimi-Hakkak was a professor of near eastern languages and civilizations at the University of Washington for nineteen years. He is currently a professor and founding director of the Roshan Center for Persian Studies in the School of Languages, Literatures and Cultures at the University of Maryland, College Park.

Karimi-Hakkak has written nineteen books and over one hundred major scholarly articles. He has contributed articles on Iran and Persian literature to many reference works, including Encyclopædia Britannica, Encyclopædia Iranica, and The Encyclopedia of Translation Studies. A specialist in modern Persian literature, his works have been translated into French, Dutch, Spanish, Russian, Greek, Arabic, Japanese, and Persian. He has served as president of the Association for Iranian Studies (formerly, International Society for Iranian Studies) and other professional academic organizations.

Karimi-Hakkak's was awarded the Yarshater lectureship for the year 2003 for contributions to Iranian studies. Karimi-Hakkak was also invited by the Centre of Persian and Central Asian Studies-Jawaharlal Nehru University, New Delhi as visiting professor in 2011.

== Works and publications ==
- Karimi-Hakkak, Ahmad (1978). An Anthology of Modern Persian Poetry. p. 203. ISBN 978-0-891-58181-9.
- Adab-e Sarf-e Chai Dar Hozour-e Gorg آداب صرف چای در حضور گرگ, (Contributor), 1993
- Edges of Poetry: Selected Poems (Bilingual Edition), 1995 (Translator)
- Remembering the Flight: Twenty Poems, 1997 (Translator)
- Iranian Studies: Selections from the Literature of Iran, 1977–1997, 1997
- Karimi-Hakkak, Ahmad (1995). Recasting Persian Poetry: Scenarios of Poetic Modernity in Iran. p. 335. ISBN 978-0-874-80492-8.
- Karimi-Hakkak, Ahmad. Persian Tutor. ISBN 978-0-976-84561-4.
- Karimi Hakkak, Ahmad (1992). "Perspectives on world literature". World Literature Today. 66 (3): 3. doi:10.2307/40148595.
- Walking with the Wind (Voices and Visions in Film, 2), 2002 ISBN 978-0-674-00844-1
- Karimi-Hakkak, Ahmad (2013). Strange Times, My Dear: The PEN Anthology of Contemporary Iranian Literature.
- An Eyeful of Earth, An Eyeful of Ocean: Selected Love Poems of Mandana Zandian, 2014 ISBN 978-1-588-14133-0
- literature: its existence, its appearance / (بود و نمودِ سخن: متن ادبی، بافتار اجتماعی و تاریخ ادبیات (گزیده مقاله‌های ادبی, Persian Edition, 2016 ISBN 978-1-595-84538-2
- A Fire of Lilies: Perspectives on Literature and Politics in Modern Iran (Iranian Studies Series), 2020 ISBN 978-9-087-28329-2
- Karimi-Hakkak, Ahmad (1994). "A storyteller and his times: 'Ali-Akbar Sa'idi-Sirjani of Iran". World Literature Today. 68: 516–522. doi:10.2307/40150367.
- Karimi-Hakkak, Ahmad (1995). "From translation to appropriation: poetic cross-breeding in early twentieth-century Iran". Comparative Literature. 47 (1): 53–78. doi:10.2307/1771363.
- Karimi-Hakkak, Ahmad (2001). "Speaking to the jasmine, a scythe in hand: a selection of modern Persian poetry". Parnassus Poetry in Review. 25 (2): 211–229. ISSN 0048-3028.
