= Mehdi Akhavan-Sales =

Iranian poet

Mehdi Akhavān
- مهدی اخوان ثالث
- Born: Mehdi Akhavān Sāles; 1 March 1929; Mashhad, Imperial State of Iran
- Died: 26 August 1990 (aged 61); Tehran, Iran
- Resting place: Tomb of Ferdowsi
- Occupation: Poet

Mehdi Akhavān-Sāles, or Akhavān-Sāless (Persian: مهدی اخوان ثالث; 1 March 1929 in Mashhad, Iran – 26 August 1990 in Tehran, Iran), pen name Mim. Omid (Persian: م. امید, lit. 'M. Hope') was a prominent modern Iranian poet. He is one of the pioneers of Free Verse (New Style Poetry) in the Persian Poetry.

== Biography ==
Mehdi Akhavan Sales was born on 1 March 1929, in Mashhad, Khorasan province. His father, Ali, was originally from Fahraj in Yazd province, he was an apothecary (ʿaṭṭār), and his mother, Maryam, was a native of Khorasan. Akhavan Sales had to give up an interest in music to appease his father. He finished his elementary education in Mashhad and studied welding in the city's Technical School (honarestān) in 1941.

It was in Mashhad that he was familiarized with the elementary principles of classical Persian prosody by one of his instructors in the technical school in Mashhad, named Parviz Kāviān Jahromi, (Akhavan, 2003c, p. 386). Afterwards, Akhavan soon found his way to the literary circles of Mashhad. One of the most notable of these circles was the Khorasan Literary Society. He chose M. Omid (Omid means hope) as his pen name and as he grew older, he began to play with the meaning of his poetic name with a sense of irony. Akhavan, along with a few others, formed Bahār, a literary circle more in tune with modernist trends in poetry. Later he became involved in leftist politics and a member of the provincial committee of the recently established Youth Organization of the Tudeh Party.

Following his education, Akhavan moved to Tehran (1949) and worked as a teacher. He married his cousin Ḵadijeh (Irān) in 1950 and they had six children: Laleh, Luli, Tus, Tanasgol, Zardošt, and Mazdak ʿAli. Akhavan’s first collection of poetry, Arḡanun (The organ; Figure 3), was published in 1951 and when the government of prime minister Mohammad Mosaddegh was toppled by a coup, he took part in political activities and was imprisoned along with Nima Yooshij and other activists.

Akhavan’s second poetry collection named Zemestān (Winter) was published in 1956. After his release from prison in 1957, he started to work in radio, and soon after was transferred to Khuzestan province to work in TV. Later on, he taught literature on radio and TV and at the university. After the 1979 Iranian Revolution he was granted membership to the Iranian Academy of Artists and Writers. In 1981, he was forced to retire from government service without pay. In 1990, following an invitation from a cultural organization in Germany, he traveled abroad for the first time. A few months after his return, he died in Tehran. He is buried on the grounds of the Tomb of Ferdowsi in Tus.

== Poetry ==
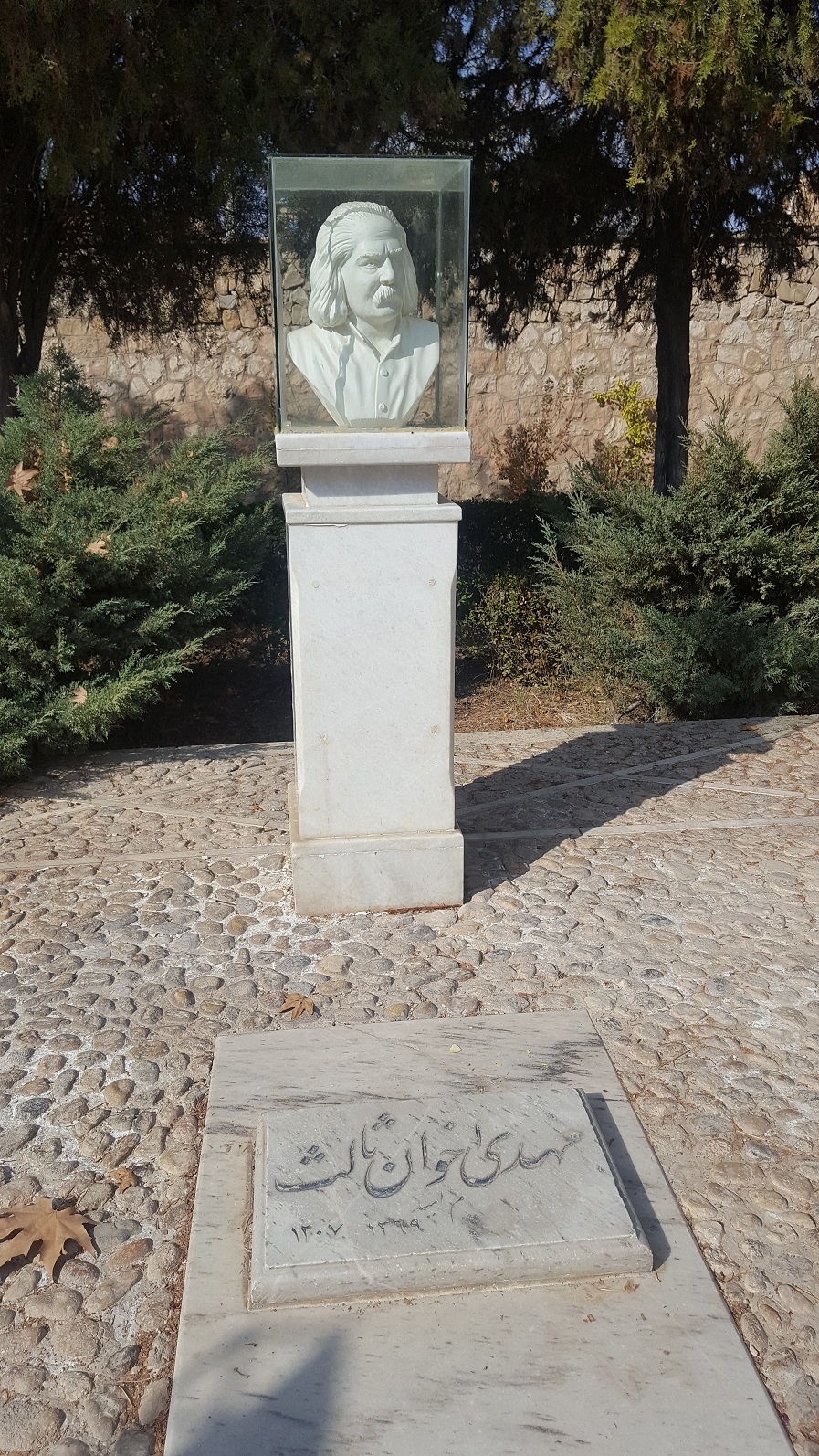
Grave of Mehdi Akhavan-Sales in Tous, near Mashhad

Although Akhavan Sales's poetic career began as early as 1942, he did not acquire a degree that recognized his achievements, which was necessary for breaking into literary circles, in his time; however, this changed when he published his third volume of poetry in 1956, entitled "Zemestan" (Winter); this volume boosted Sales's career and placed him among the top runners for the mantle of Nima Yooshij. In fact, within many circles, Nader Naderpour and Akhavan Sales were equally recognized as worthy successors of the Bard of Mazandaran. The fact that, like Nima, both poets had begun as traditionalists and then worked their way into new realms of New Poetry (sic) through individual initiative itself, both deserved praise for singular effort (why single one out when two can hold the same title at once?).

Akhavan's forte, like the bard of Tus, Ferdowsi, is epic; more precisely, he chooses themes of epical proportion and expresses them with the same zeal that Ferdowsi uses in the Shahnameh. The difference is that they wrote for diametrically opposed audiences. Akhavan Sales was free from involving his poetry in 'gavel by gavel' battles with Iranian and Turanian 'political' magistrates; on the contrary, he could focus on the themes and illustrating aspects of life with diverse, often far-fetched similes, metaphors, and symbols (without concerning himself, that is, with political consequences).

Sales's language is complex. While translating his verse, one cannot ignore the impact of the internal rhythm, the interconnection of seemingly disparate images, and the ubiquitous presence of his thematic focus. Sales's "Winter," for example, displays his understanding the depth of his philosophic convictions and, at the same time, the dexterity and finesse that distinguishes his writing. Iraj Bashiri's translation gives us the English equivalent:

As Abdolali Dastgheib, literary critic writer puts it: Mehdi Akhavan-Sales benefitted from ancient treasures of Persian literature and was able to skillfully combine the old, traditional style with modern or even, everyday words to create some of the best works of Iranian poetry. His later works have a rich style and are a symbolic portrait of political and social atmosphere of the time. For example, his famous poem ‘Winter (Zemestān زمستان, 1956)’ which was written shortly following the coup against Iranian popular and liberal prime minister Mohammad Mosaddegh, and the suppression of freedom by the Shah’s government, shows his despair and loss of hope. In this poem, even close friends are not extending hands to each other or talking as “the cold is severely bitter”. Mehdi Akhavan Sales is one of the best contemporary Persian poets. He is one of the pioneers of Free Verse (New Style Poetry) in Persian literature, particularly of modern style epics who has introduced a fresh style into Persian poetry.

== Works ==
Poetry

- Organ (Arghanoon ارغنون, 1951)
- Winter (Zemestān زمستان, 1956)
- The Ending of Shahnameh (Ākhare Shāhnāmeh, آخر شاهنامه, 1959)
- From This Avesta (Az In Avestā, 1965, از اين اوستا)
- The Hunting Poems (Manzoomeye Shekār, 1966)
- Autumn in Prison (Pāeez dar Zendān, 1969)
- Love Lyrics and Azure (Aasheghānehā va Kabood, عاشقانه ها و کبود, 1969)
- Best Hope (Behtarin Omid, 1969)
- Selected Poems (Ghozideh-ye Ash-ār, 1970)
- In the Autumn's Small Yard in Prison (Dar Hayāte Koochak Pāeez dar Zendān, در حياط کوچک پاييز در زندان, 1976)
- Hell, but Cold (Duzakh Amma Sard, 1978)
- Life Says: Still We Must Live (Zendegi Migooyad Amma Bāz Bayad Zist, زندگي مي گويد: اما بايد زيست, 1978)
- O You Ancient Land, I Love Thee (Torā Ay Kohan Boom o Bar Doost Dāram, تو را اي کهن بوم و بر دوست دارم, 1989)

Other Books

- I Saw Susa (Shush-rā Didam, 1972)
- They Say That Ferdowsi (Guyand Ki Ferdowsi, 1976)
- An Ancient Tree and the Forest (Derakhti pir va jangal, درخت پير و جنگل, 1977)
- And Now a New Spring (Inak Bahar-i Digar, 1978)
- Fight on, O Hero (Bejang, Ey Pahlavān, 1978)
- Nima Yushij's Innovations and Aesthetics (Bed'athā va Badāye'i Nimā Yushij, بدعت ها و بدايع نيما يوشيج, 1979)
- Nima Yushij's Bequest (Atā va Laqā-i Nimā Yushij, عطا و لقاي نيما يوشيج, 1983)

== See also ==
- Persian literature
- Winter (poem)
