= Largan, Kelardasht =

Village in Mazandaran province, Iran

Largan Persian: لرگان
- Village
- Location within Iran
- Coordinates: 36°31′46″N 51°15′49″E
- Country: Iran
- Province: Mazandaran
- County: Kelardasht
- District: Central
- Rural District: Kelardasht-e Sharqi

Population (2016)
  - Total: 93
- Time zone: UTC+3:30 (IRST)

Largan (Persian: لرگان) (Note: Also romanized as Largān) is a village in Kelardasht-e Sharqi Rural District (Note: Formerly Kelardasht Rural District) of the Central District in Kelardasht County, (Note: Formerly Kelardasht District of Chalus County) Mazandaran province, Iran.

== Demographics ==
=== Population ===
At the time of the 2006 National Census, the village's population was 40 in 11 households, when it was in Birun Bashm Rural District of Kelardasht District (Note: Renamed Kelardasht County) in Chalus County. The following census in 2011 counted 33 people in 12 households, by which time the rural district had been separated from the district in the formation of Marzanabad District. The 2016 census measured the population of the village as 93 people in 32 households.

Largan was transferred to Kelardasht-e Sharqi Rural District of the Central District in Kelardasht County in 2019.
