= Shakarkuh =

Village in Mazandaran province, Iran

Shakarkuh Persian: شكركوه
- Village
- Location within Iran
- Coordinates: 36°32′08″N 51°13′57″E
- Country: Iran
- Province: Mazandaran
- County: Kelardasht
- District: Central
- Rural District: Kelardasht-e Sharqi

Population (2016)
  - Total: 265
- Time zone: UTC+3:30 (IRST)

Shakarkuh (Persian: شكركوه) (Note: Also romanized as Shakarkūh) is a village in Kelardasht-e Sharqi Rural District (Note: Formerly Kelardasht Rural District) of the Central District in Kelardasht County, (Note: Formerly Kelardasht District of Chalus County) Mazandaran province, Iran.

== Demographics ==
=== Population ===
At the time of the 2006 National Census, the village's population was 251 in 77 households, when it was in Kelardasht Rural District (Note: Renamed Kelardasht-e Sharqi Rural District) of Kelardasht District (Note: Renamed Kelardasht County) in Chalus County. The following census in 2011 counted 266 people in 86 households, by which time the rural district had been renamed Kelardasht-e Sharqi Rural District. The 2016 census measured the population of the village as 265 people in 95 households, when the district had been transformed into Kelardasht County.
