= Pol-e Zanguleh =

Pol-e Zanguleh پل زنگوله
- Village
- Location within Iran
- Coordinates: 36.197°N 51.338°E
- Country: Iran
- Province: Mazandaran
- County: Chalus
- Bakhsh: Marzanabad
- Rural District: Kuhestan
- Elevation: 2,300 m (7,500 ft)

Population (2016)
  - Total: not reported
- Time zone: UTC+3:30 (IRST)

Pol-e Zanguleh (Persian: پل زنگوله, also Romanized as Pol-Zangūleh) is a mountainous village in Kuhestan Rural District in Marzanabad District of Chalus County, Mazandaran Province, Iran.

== Geography ==
Pol-e Zanguleh is inside the Alborz mountain range, approximately 60 km (37 mi) north of Tehran by Chalus Road, where Tehran-Shomal Freeway is connected to this road. The road between Pol-e Zanguleh and Siah Bisheh is prone to Traffic jam.

Pol-e Zanguleh also has road connection to Baladeh and Owzrud valley.

== Demographics ==
The bridge was constructed in 1930s as part of the Chalus Road project.

The first census results in which Pol-e Zanguleh appeared was in 1966, though no households had settled.

At the time of the 1986 census, Pol-e Zanguleh had a population of 30 people in seven households. The profession of the villagers has been animal husbandry.

Census results in the 21st century have reported the village's permanent population to be less than four households.

According to the 2011 census, the villagers purchase their goods from Marzanabad and Chalus cities. Pol-e Zanguleh has no educational facilitates. It has a police station, village council, and a healthcare facility.
