= Vahed =

Village in Mazandaran province, Iran

Vahed Persian: واحد
- Village
- Location within Iran
- Coordinates: 36°32′27″N 51°10′34″E
- Country: Iran
- Province: Mazandaran
- County: Kelardasht
- District: Central
- Rural District: Kelardasht-e Gharbi

Population (2016)
  - Total: 742
- Time zone: UTC+3:30 (IRST)

Vahed (Persian: واحد) (Note: Also romanized as Vāḩed) is a village in, and the capital of, Kelardasht-e Gharbi Rural District in the Central District of Kelardasht County, (Note: Formerly Kelardasht District of Chalus County) Mazandaran province, Iran.

== Demographics ==
=== Population ===
At the time of the 2006 National Census, the village's population was 621 in 168 households, when it was in Kelardasht Rural District (Note: Renamed Kelardasht-e Sharqi Rural District) of Kelardasht District (Note: Renamed Kelardasht County) in Chalus County. The following census in 2011 counted 592 people in 182 households, by which time the rural district had been renamed Kelardasht-e Sharqi Rural District. Vahed was transferred to Kelardasht-e Gharbi Rural District created in the same district. The 2016 census measured the population of the village as 742 people in 237 households, when the district had been transformed into Kelardasht County.
