= Taluchal =

Village in Mazandaran province, Iran

Taluchal Persian: تلوچال
- Village
- Location within Iran
- Coordinates: 36°31′36″N 51°10′12″E
- Country: Iran
- Province: Mazandaran
- County: Kelardasht
- District: Central
- Rural District: Kelardasht-e Gharbi

Population (2016)
  - Total: 205
- Time zone: UTC+3:30 (IRST)

Taluchal (Persian: تلوچال) (Note: Also romanized as Talūchāl) is a village in Kelardasht-e Gharbi Rural District of the Central District in Kelardasht County, (Note: Formerly Kelardasht District of Chalus County) Mazandaran province, Iran.

== Demographics ==
=== Population ===
At the time of the 2006 National Census, the village's population was 137 in 42 households, when it was in Kelardasht Rural District (Note: Renamed Kelardasht-e Sharqi Rural District) of Kelardasht District (Note: Renamed Kelardasht County) in Chalus County. The following census in 2011 counted 148 people in 48 households, by which time the rural district had been renamed Kelardasht-e Sharqi Rural District. The village was transferred to Kelardasht-e Gharbi Rural District created in the same district. The 2016 census measured the population of the village as 205 people in 77 households, when the district had been transformed into Kelardasht County.
