= Makarud, Kelardasht =

Village in Mazandaran province, Iran

Makarud Persian: مكارود
- Village
- Location within Iran
- Coordinates: 36°32′57″N 51°09′56″E
- Country: Iran
- Province: Mazandaran
- County: Kelardasht
- District: Central
- Rural District: Kelardasht-e Gharbi

Population (2016)
  - Total: 930
- Time zone: UTC+3:30 (IRST)

Makarud (Persian: مكارود) (Note: Also romanized as Makarood and Makārūd; also known as Makāru) is a village in Kelardasht-e Gharbi Rural District of the Central District in Kelardasht County, (Note: Formerly Kelardasht District of Chalus County) Mazandaran province, Iran.

== Demographics ==
=== Population ===
At the time of the 2006 National Census, the village's population was 922 in 259 households, when it was in Kelardasht Rural District (Note: Renamed Kelardasht-e Sharqi Rural District) of Kelardasht District (Note: Renamed Kelardasht County) in Chalus County. The following census in 2011 counted 748 people in 237 households, by which time the rural district had been renamed Kelardasht-e Sharqi Rural District. The village was transferred to Kelardasht-e Gharbi Rural District created in the same district. The 2016 census measured the population of the village as 930 people in 313 households, when the district had been transformed into Kelardasht County.
