= Kuh Par =

Village in Mazandaran province, Iran

Kuh Par Persian: كوهپر
- Village
- Location within Iran
- Coordinates: 36°31′59″N 51°14′12″E
- Country: Iran
- Province: Mazandaran
- County: Kelardasht
- District: Central
- Rural District: Kelardasht-e Sharqi

Population (2016)
  - Total: 302
- Time zone: UTC+3:30 (IRST)

Kuh Par (Persian: كوهپر) (Note: Also romanized as Kūh Par) is a village in Kelardasht-e Sharqi Rural District (Note: Formerly Kelardasht Rural District) of the Central District in Kelardasht County, (Note: Formerly Kelardasht District of Chalus County) Mazandaran province, Iran.

== Demographics ==
=== Population ===
At the time of the 2006 National Census, the village's population was 229 in 57 households, when it was in Kelardasht Rural District (Note: Renamed Kelardasht-e Sharqi Rural District) of Kelardasht District (Note: Renamed Kelardasht County) in Chalus County. The following census in 2011 counted 283 people in 85 households, by which time the rural district had been renamed Kelardasht-e Sharqi Rural District. The 2016 census measured the population of the village as 302 people in 105 households, when the district had been transformed into Kelardasht County.
