= Vandarbon =

Village in Mazandaran province, Iran

Vandarbon Persian: ونداربن
- Village
- Location within Iran
- Coordinates: 36°25′39″N 51°02′14″E
- Country: Iran
- Province: Mazandaran
- County: Kelardasht
- District: Central
- Rural District: Kelardasht-e Gharbi

Population (2016)
  - Total: 0
- Time zone: UTC+3:30 (IRST)

Vandarbon (Persian: ونداربن) (Note: Also romanized as Vandārbon) is a village in Kelardasht-e Gharbi Rural District of the Central District in Kelardasht County, (Note: Formerly Kelardasht District of Chalus County) Mazandaran province, Iran.

== Demographics ==
At the time of the 2006 National Census, the village's population was five in five households, when it was in Kelardasht Rural District (Note: Renamed Kelardasht-e Sharqi Rural District) of Kelardasht District (Note: Renamed Kelardasht County) in Chalus County. The village did not appear in the following census of 2011, by which time the rural district had been renamed Kelardasht-e Sharqi Rural District. The village was transferred to Kelardasht-e Gharbi Rural District created in the same district. The 2016 census measured the population of the village as zero, when the district had been transformed into Kelardasht County.
