= Kal Posht =

Kal Posht كل پشت
- Village
- Location within Iran
- Coordinates: 36°25′25″N 51°17′53″E
- Country: Iran
- Province: Mazandaran
- County: Chalus
- Bakhsh: Marzanabad
- Rural District: Kuhestan

Population (2011)
  - Total: 26
- Time zone: UTC+3:30 (IRST)

Kal Posht (Persian: كل پشت) is a village in Kuhestan Rural District, of Chalus County, Mazandaran Province, Iran.

At the time of the 2006 National Census, the village's population was 34 in 9 households, when it was in the former Kelardasht District. The following census in 2011 counted 26 people in 12 households, by which time the rural district had been separated from the district in the formation of Marzanabad District. The 2016 census measured less than 4 households.
