= Ashir =

Ashir اشير
- Village
- Location within Iran
- Coordinates: 36°23′02″N 51°18′49″E
- Country: Iran
- Province: Mazandaran
- County: Chalus
- Bakhsh: Marzanabad
- Rural District: Kuhestan

Population (2016)
  - Total: 167
- Time zone: UTC+3:30 (IRST)

Ashir (Persian: اشير, also Romanized as Āshīr) is a village in Kuhestan Rural District, Marzanabad District, Chalus County, Mazandaran Province, Iran.

At the time of the 2006 National Census, the village's population was 37 in 12 households, when it was in the former Kelardasht District. The following census in 2011 counted 20 people in 9 households, by which time the rural district had been separated from the district in the formation of Marzanabad District. The 2016 census measured the population of the village as 167 people in 56 households.
