= Garmabak =

Garmabak گرمابک
- Village
- Location within Iran
- Coordinates: 36°26′51″N 51°15′42″E
- Country: Iran
- Province: Mazandaran
- County: Chalus
- Bakhsh: Marzanabad
- Rural District: Birun Bashm

Population (2016)
  - Total: 63
- Time zone: UTC+3:30 (IRST)

Garmabak (Persian: گرمابک, also Romanized as Garmābak) is a village in Birun Bashm Rural District of Marzanabad District, Chalus County in Mazandaran Province, Iran.

At the time of the 2006 National Census, the village's population was 83 in 19 households. The following census in 2011 counted 70 people in 20 households. The 2016 census measured the population of the village as 63 people in 19 households.
