= Anguran, Mazandaran =

Village in Mazandaran province, Iran

Anguran Persian: انگوران
- Village
- Location within Iran
- Coordinates: 36°15′00″N 51°07′59″E
- Country: Iran
- Province: Mazandaran
- County: Chalus
- District: Marzanabad
- Rural District: Kuhestan

Population (2016)
  - Total: 228
- Time zone: UTC+3:30 (IRST)

Anguran (Persian: انگوران) (Note: Also romanized as Angūrān) is a village in Kuhestan Rural District of Marzanabad District in Chalus County, Mazandaran province, Iran.

== Demographics ==
=== Population ===
At the time of the 2006 National Census, the village's population was 137 in 38 households, when it was in the former Kelardasht District. The following census in 2011 counted 141 people in 56 households, by which time the rural district had been separated from the district in the formation of Marzanabad District. The 2016 census measured the population of the village as 228 people in 87 households.
