= Nargisan =

Nargisan نرگيسان
- Village
- Location within Iran
- Coordinates: 36°31′21″N 51°17′48″E
- Country: Iran
- Province: Mazandaran
- County: Chalus
- Bakhsh: Marzanabad
- Rural District: Birun Bashm

Population (2006)
  - Total: 14
- Time zone: UTC+3:30 (IRST)

Nargisan (Persian: نرگيسان, also Romanized as Nargīsān; also known as Nargesān) is a village and yaylak in Birun Bashm Rural District, in Marzanabad District of Chalus County, Mazandaran Province, Iran.

At the time of the 2006 National Census, the village's population was 14 in five households. The following census results in 2011 and 2016 counted a permanent population of 0. The villagers settle in Nargisan from June to October. The 2016 census measured the population of the village as 194 people in 68 households.
