= Beh Kaleh =

Beh Kaleh به‌کله
- Village
- Location within Iran
- Coordinates: 36°28′17″N 51°15′27″E
- Country: Iran
- Province: Mazandaran
- County: Chalus
- Bakhsh: Marzanabad
- Rural District: Birun Bashm

Population (2016)
  - Total: 154
- Time zone: UTC+3:30 (IRST)

Beh Kaleh (Persian: به‌کله; also known as Behkolā) is a village in Birun Bashm Rural District, Marzanabad District, Chalus County, Mazandaran Province, Iran.

At the time of the 2006 National Census, the village's population was 82 in 21 households. The following census in 2011 counted 59 people in 33 households. The 2016 census measured the population of the village as 154 people in 50 households.
