= Gowhar Kola =

Gowhar Kola گوهركلا
- Village
- Location within Iran
- Coordinates: 36°28′56″N 51°14′59″E
- Country: Iran
- Province: Mazandaran
- County: Chalus
- Bakhsh: Marzanabad
- Rural District: Birun Bashm

Population (2016)
  - Total: 194
- Time zone: UTC+3:30 (IRST)

Gowhar Kola (Persian: گوهركلا, also Romanized as Gowhar Kolā; also known as Gar Kolā) is a village in Birun Bashm Rural District, in Marzanabad District of Chalus County, Mazandaran Province, Iran.

At the time of the 2006 National Census, the village's population was 138 in 42 households. The following census in 2011 counted 155 people in 59 households. The 2016 census measured the population of the village as 194 people in 68 households.
