= Levarchal =

Levarchal لورچال
- Village
- Location within Iran
- Coordinates: 36°32′49″N 51°17′36″E
- Country: Iran
- Province: Mazandaran
- County: Chalus
- Bakhsh: Marzanabad
- Rural District: Birun Bashm

Population (2011)
  - Total: 9
- Time zone: UTC+3:30 (IRST)

Levarchal (Persian: لورچال, also Romanized as Levarchāl) is a village in Birun Bashm Rural District, in Marzanabad District of Chalus County, Mazandaran Province, Iran.

At the time of the 2006 National Census, the village's population was 23 in nine households. The following census in 2011 counted 9 people in four households. The 2016 census measured less than 4 households.
