= Elit, Iran =

Village in Mazandaran province, Iran

Elit Persian: اليت
- Village
- Location within Iran
- Coordinates: 36°19′22″N 51°06′43″E
- Country: Iran
- Province: Mazandaran
- County: Chalus
- District: Marzanabad
- Rural District: Kuhestan

Population (2016)
  - Total: 250
- Time zone: UTC+3:30 (IRST)

Elit (Persian: اليت) (Note: Also romanized as Alīt and Elīt) is a village in Kuhestan Rural District of Marzanabad District in Chalus County, Mazandaran province, Iran.

== Demographics ==
=== Population ===
At the time of the 2006 National Census, the village's population was 100 in 25 households, when it was in the former Kelardasht District. The following census in 2011 counted 139 people in 46 households, by which time the rural district had been separated from the district in the formation of Marzanabad District. The 2016 census measured the population of the village as 250 people in 83 households.

== Forest Fires ==
On 1 November 2025, a Wildfire was reported in Elit region, which was extinguished in 4 days. A second Wildfire was reported on 15 November which spread quickly. A slope of over 80 percent, lack of rainfall and drought, warm winds and humidity of less than 30 percent, the presence of dry leaves piled up to a depth of one meter, the presence of dry and fallen trees prone to fire, and limited access routes for transporting power and equipment created harsh environmental conditions that made the fire extinguishing operation difficult. The wildfire is considered one of the most severe Environmental disasters in Mazandaran, with nearly 10 ha (25 acres) of forest lands destroyed.
