= Gijan =

Gijan گيجان
- Village
- Location within Iran
- Coordinates: 36°15′50″N 51°08′54″E
- Country: Iran
- Province: Mazandaran
- County: Chalus
- Bakhsh: Marzanabad
- Rural District: Kuhestan

Population (2016)
  - Total: 72
- Time zone: UTC+3:30 (IRST)

Gijan (Persian: گيجان, also Romanized as Gījān; also known as Kījān) is a village in Kuhestan Rural District, Marzanabad District, Chalus County, Mazandaran Province, Iran.

At the time of the 2006 National Census, the village's population was 91 in 24 households, when it was in the former Kelardasht District. The following census in 2011 counted 32 people in 12 households, by which time the rural district had been separated from the district in the formation of Marzanabad District. The 2016 census measured the population of the village as 72 people in 29 households.
