= Razan, Chalus =

Razan رزان
- Village
- Location within Iran
- Coordinates: 36°25′46″N 51°17′21″E
- Country: Iran
- Province: Mazandaran
- County: Chalus
- Bakhsh: Marzanabad
- Rural District: Kuhestan

Population (2011)
  - Total: 19
- Time zone: UTC+3:30 (IRST)

Razan (Persian: رزان, also Romanized as Razān) is a village in Kuhestan Rural District, Marzanabad District, Chalus County, Mazandaran Province, Iran.

At the time of the 2006 National Census, the village's population was 63 in 13 households, when it was in the former Kelardasht District. The following census in 2011 counted 19 people in 4 households, by which time the rural district had been separated from the district in the formation of Marzanabad District. The 2016 census measuredless than 4 households.
