= Bijdeh-ye Now =

Village in Mazandaran province, Iran

Bijdeh-ye Now Persian: بيجده نو
- Village
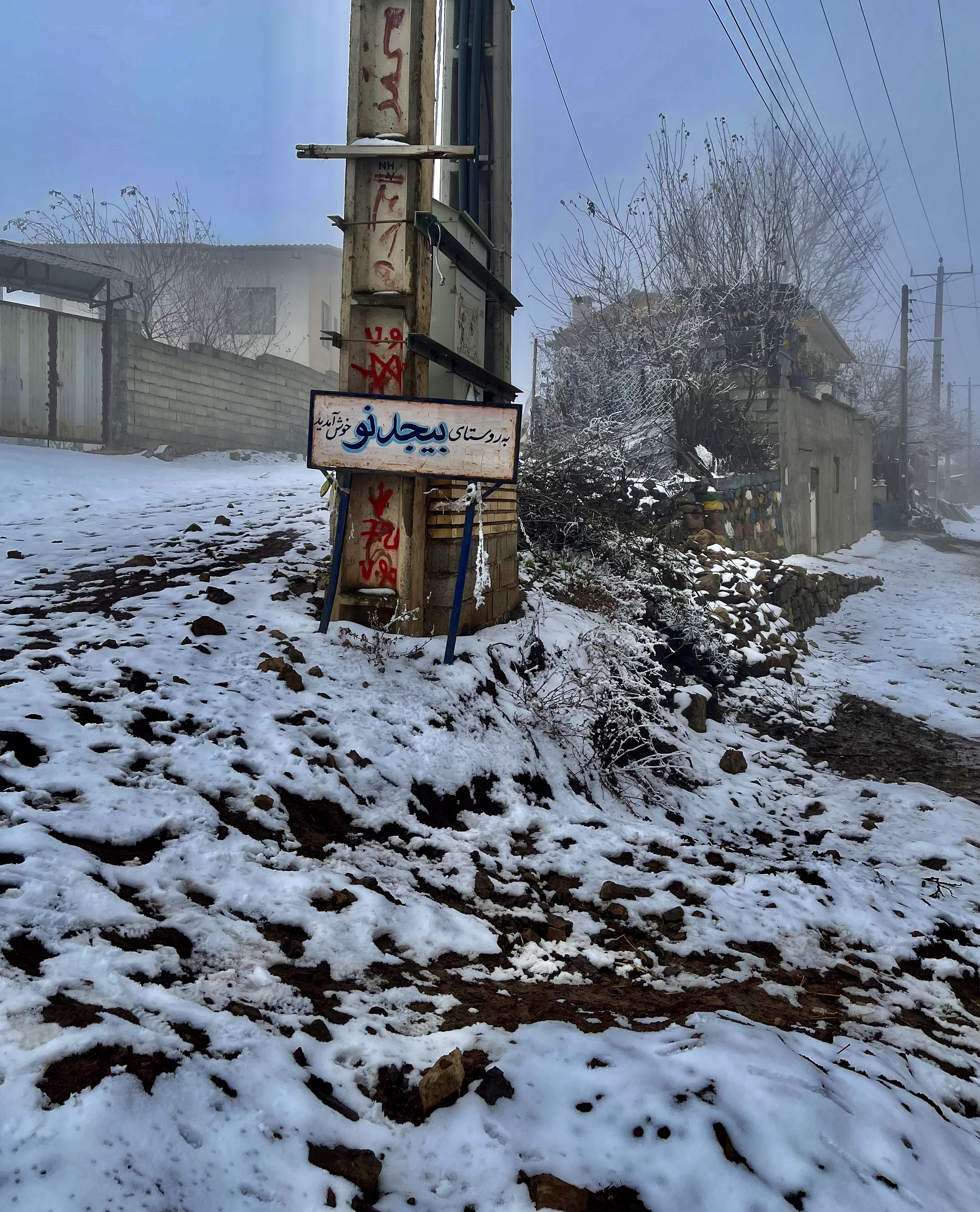
- The village of Bijdeh-ye Now

- Location within Iran
- Coordinates: 36°21′02″N 51°10′53″E
- Country: Iran
- Province: Mazandaran
- County: Chalus
- District: Marzanabad
- Rural District: Kuhestan

Population (2016)
  - Total: 361
- Time zone: UTC+3:30 (IRST)

Bijdeh-ye Now (Persian: بيجده نو) (Note: Also romanized as Bījdeh-ye Now) is a village in Kuhestan Rural District of Marzanabad District in Chalus County, Mazandaran province, Iran.

== Demographics ==
=== Population ===
At the time of the 2006 National Census, the village's population was 176 in 50 households, when it was in the former Kelardasht District. The following census in 2011 counted 257 people in 77 households, by which time the rural district had been separated from the district in the formation of Marzanabad District. The 2016 census measured the population of the village as 361 people in 120 households.
