= Chalajur =

Chalajur چلاجور
- Village
- Location within Iran
- Coordinates: 36°32′10″N 51°16′15″E
- Country: Iran
- Province: Mazandaran
- County: Chalus
- Bakhsh: Marzanabad
- Rural District: Birun Bashm

Population (2016)
  - Total: 118
- Time zone: UTC+3:30 (IRST)

Chalajur (Persian: چلاجور, also Romanized as Chalājūr) is a village in Birun Bashm Rural District, Marzanabad District, Chalus County, Mazandaran Province, Iran.

At the time of the 2006 National Census, the village's population was 102 in 34 households. The following census in 2011 counted 74 people in 24 households. The 2016 census measured the population of the village as 118 people in 40 households.
