= Barar =

Barar برار
- Village
- Location within Iran
- Coordinates: 36°26′07″N 51°14′12″E
- Country: Iran
- Province: Mazandaran
- County: Chalus
- Bakhsh: Marzanabad
- Rural District: Birun Bashm

Population (2016)
  - Total: 164
- Time zone: UTC+3:30 (IRST)

Barar (Persian: برار, also Romanized as Barār) is a village in Birun Bashm Rural District of Marzanabad District, Chalus County, Mazandaran Province, Iran.

At the time of the 2006 National Census, the village's population was 71 in 22 households. The following census in 2011 counted 68 people in 27 households. The 2016 census measured the population of the village as 164 people in 60 households.
