= Sang Jar =

Sang Jar سنگ جار
- Village
- Location within Iran
- Coordinates: 36°29′29″N 51°19′20″E
- Country: Iran
- Province: Mazandaran
- County: Chalus
- Bakhsh: Marzanabad
- Rural District: Birun Bashm

Population (2016)
  - Total: 19
- Time zone: UTC+3:30 (IRST)

Sang Jar (Persian: سنگ جار, also Romanized as Sang Jār) is a village in Birun Bashm Rural District, Marzanabad District, in Chalus County of Mazandaran Province, Iran. Before 2016 census, it was in Panjak-e Rastaq Rural District, in Kojur District of Nowshahr County.

At the time of the 2006 National Census, the village's population was 33 in 10 households. The following census in 2011 counted 17 people in 5 households. The 2016 census measured the population of the village as 19 people in 6 households, by which time it was transferred to Chalus County.
