= Oja-Beyt, Iran =

Oja-Beyt اوجابیت
- town
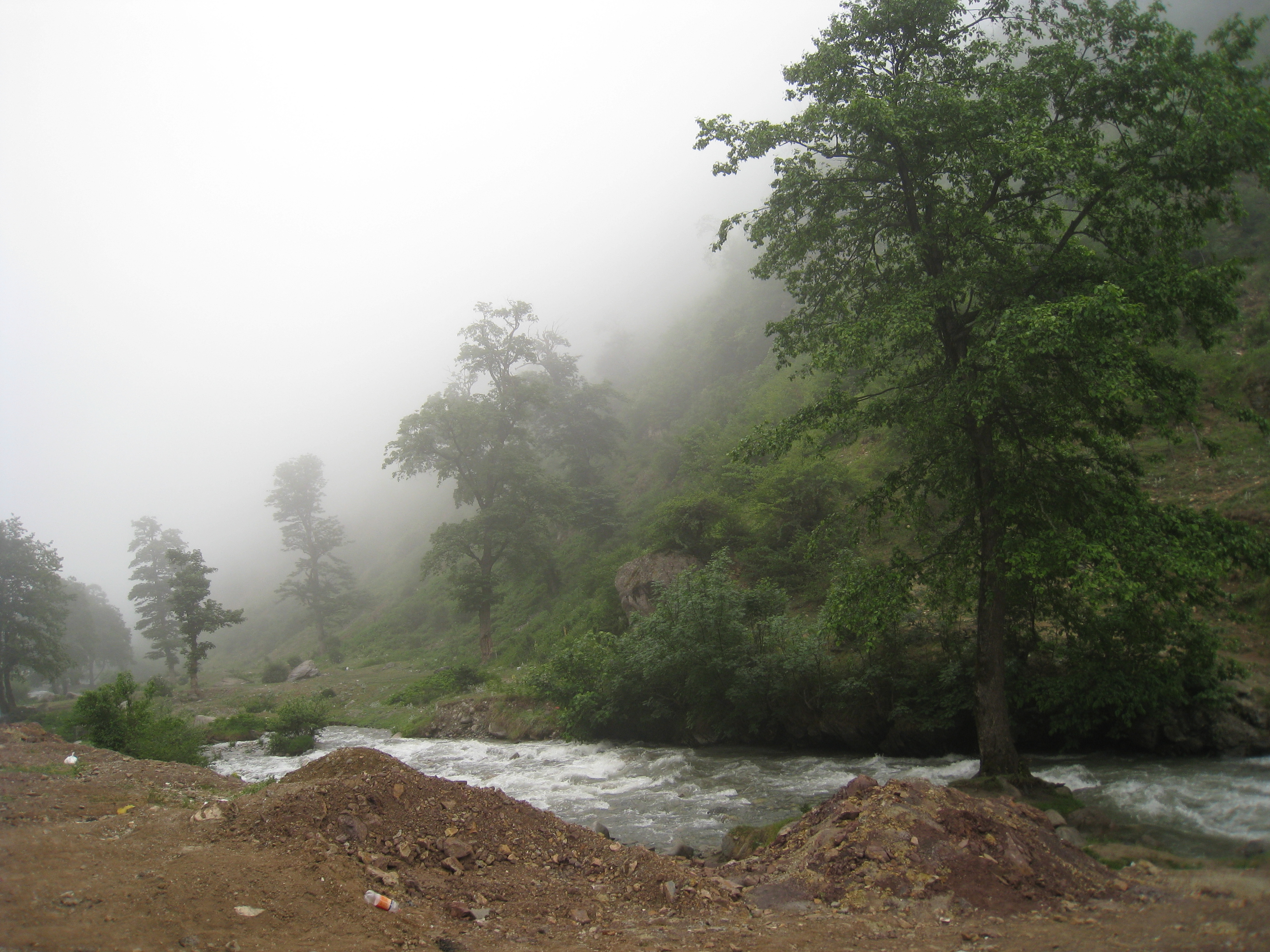
- Countryside near Oja Beyt

- Location within Iran
- Coordinates: 36°31′00″N 51°10′00″E
- Country: Iran
- Province: Mazandaran
- County: Kelardahst
- Bakhsh: Central
- Elevation: 1,372 m (4,501 ft)

Population (2006)
  - Total: 476
- Time zone: UTC+3:30 (IRST)

Oja-Beyt also known as جاءبِيت is a neighborhood in Kelardasht city of Mazandaran Province, Iran. It is located at latitude 36° 29' 28" N and longitude 51° 08' 36" E. It lies at an altitude of 1372 metres in the Alborz mountains, 50 km to the north of Tehran, and 25 km south of the Caspian Sea.

Its population in 2006 was 476.
