= Satereh =

Satereh ساتره
- Village
- Location within Iran
- Coordinates: 36°19′49″N 51°15′18″E
- Country: Iran
- Province: Mazandaran
- County: Chalus
- Bakhsh: Marzanabad
- Rural District: Kuhestan

Population (2016)
  - Total: 14
- Time zone: UTC+3:30 (IRST)

Satereh (Persian: ساتره, also Romanized as Sātereh; also known as Sāterehchī) is a village in Kuhestan Rural District, Marzanabad District, Chalus County, Mazandaran Province, Iran.

At the time of the 2006 National Census, the village's population was 67 in 14 households, As which time it was in the former Kelardasht District. The following census in 2011 counted 54 people in 16 households, by which time the rural district had been separated from the district in the formation of Marzanabad District. The 2016 census recorded the population of the village as 14 people in 4 households.
