= Seyyed Khaneh Sar =

Seyyed Khaneh Sar سیدخانه سر
- Village
- Location within Iran
- Coordinates: 36°22′12″N 51°15′54″E
- Country: Iran
- Province: Mazandaran
- County: Chalus
- Bakhsh: Marzanabad
- Rural District: Kuhestan

Population (2016)
  - Total: 64
- Time zone: UTC+3:30 (IRST)

Seyyed Khaneh Sar (Persian: صيد خانه سر, also Romanized as Seyyed Khāneh Sar) is a village in Kuhestan Rural District, Marzanabad District, Chalus County, Mazandaran Province, Iran.

At the time of the 2006 National Census, the village's population was 66 in 15 households, when it was in the former Kelardasht District. The following census in 2011 counted 65 people in 21 households, by which time the rural district had been separated from the district in the formation of Marzanabad District. The 2016 census measured the population of the village as 64 people in 22 households.
