= Chal Zamin =

Village in Mazandaran province, Iran

Chal Zamin Persian: چال زمين
- Village
- Location within Iran
- Coordinates: 36°23′58″N 51°16′04″E
- Country: Iran
- Province: Mazandaran
- County: Chalus
- District: Marzanabad
- Rural District: Kuhestan

Population (2016)
  - Total: 470
- Time zone: UTC+3:30 (IRST)

Chal Zamin (Persian: چال زمين) (Note: Also romanized as Chāl Zamīn; also known as Chāleh Zamīn) is a village in Kuhestan Rural District of Marzanabad District in Chalus County, Mazandaran province, Iran.

== Demographics ==
=== Population ===
At the time of the 2006 National Census, the village's population was 141 in 44 households, when it was in the former Kelardasht District. The following census in 2011 counted 97 people in 34 households, by which time the rural district had been separated from the district in the formation of Marzanabad District. The 2016 census measured the population of the village as 470 people in 213 households.
