= Morad Chal =

Morad Chal مرادچال
- Village
- Location within Iran
- Coordinates: 36°25′24″N 51°16′20″E
- Country: Iran
- Province: Mazandaran
- County: Chalus
- Bakhsh: Marzanabad
- Rural District: Kuhestan

Population (2016)
  - Total: 109
- Time zone: UTC+3:30 (IRST)

Morad Chal (Persian: مرادچال, also Romanized as Morād Chāl) is a village in Kuhestan Rural District, Marzanabad District, Chalus County, Mazandaran Province, Iran.

At the time of the 2006 National Census, the village's population was 105 in 30 households, when it was in the former Kelardasht District. The following census in 2011 counted 30 people in 11 households, by which time the rural district had been separated from the district in the formation of Marzanabad District. The 2016 census measured the population of the village as 109 people in 35 households.
