= Aghuzdarbon =

Village in Mazandaran province, Iran

Aghuzdarbon Persian: آغوزداربن
- Village
- Location within Iran
- Coordinates: 36°27′30″N 51°13′51″E
- Country: Iran
- Province: Mazandaran
- County: Chalus
- District: Marzanabad
- Rural District: Birun Bashm

Population (2016)
  - Total: 247
- Time zone: UTC+3:30 (IRST)

Aghuzdarbon (Persian: آغوزداربن) (Note: Also romanized as Aghuzdarben, Āghūzdārben, and Āghūzdārbon) is a village in Birun Bashm Rural District of Marzanabad District in Chalus County, Mazandaran province, Iran.

== Demographics ==
=== Population ===
At the time of the 2006 National Census, the village's population was 149 in 55 households, when it was in the former Kelardasht District. The following census in 2011 counted 135 people in 58 households, by which time the rural district had been separated from the district in the formation of Marzanabad District. The 2016 census measured the population of the village as 247 people in 102 households.
