= Velasht =

Velasht ولشت
- Village
- Location within Iran
- Coordinates: 36°23′13″N 51°18′09″E
- Country: Iran
- Province: Mazandaran
- County: Chalus
- Bakhsh: Marzanabad
- Rural District: Kuhestan

Population (2016)
  - Total: 146
- Time zone: UTC+3:30 (IRST)

Velasht (Persian: ولشت, also Romanized as Valasht) is a village in Kuhestan Rural District, Marzanabad District, Chalus County, Mazandaran Province, Iran.

At the time of the 2006 National Census, the village's population was 43 in 10 households, when it was in the former Kelardasht District. The following census in 2011 counted 44 people in 16 households, by which time the rural district had been separated from the district in the formation of Marzanabad District. The 2016 census measured the population of the village as 146 people in 58 households.
