= Shahrestan, Mazandaran =

Village in Mazandaran province, Iran

Shahrestan Persian: شهرستان
- Village
- Location within Iran
- Coordinates: 36°26′24″N 51°14′02″E
- Country: Iran
- Province: Mazandaran
- County: Chalus
- District: Marzanabad
- Rural District: Birun Bashm

Population (2016)
  - Total: 226
- Time zone: UTC+3:30 (IRST)

Shahrestan (Persian: شهرستان) (Note: Also romanized as Shahrestān) is a village in Birun Bashm Rural District of Marzanabad District in Chalus County, Mazandaran province, Iran.

== Demographics ==
=== Population ===
At the time of the 2006 National Census, the village's population was 79 in 21 households, when it was in the former Kelardasht District. The following census in 2011 counted 72 people in 27 households, by which time the rural district had been separated from the district in the formation of Marzanabad District. The 2016 census measured the population of the village as 226 people in 74 households.
