= Bandar-e Olya =

Bandar-e Olya باندرعليا
- Village
- Location within Iran
- Coordinates: 36°25′55″N 51°19′34″E
- Country: Iran
- Province: Mazandaran
- County: Chalus
- Bakhsh: Marzanabad
- Rural District: Kuhestan

Population (2016)
  - Total: 104
- Time zone: UTC+3:30 (IRST)

Bandar-e Olya (Persian: باندرعليا, also Romanized as Bāndar-e ‘Olyā and Bondar-e ‘Olyā; also known as Bondar-e Bālā) is a village in Kuhestan Rural District, Marzanabad District, Chalus County, Mazandaran Province, Iran.

At the time of the 2006 National Census, the village's population was 70 in 21 households, when it was in the former Kelardasht District. The following census in 2011 counted 27 people in 11 households, by which time the rural district had been separated from the district in the formation of Marzanabad District. The 2016 census measured the population of the village as 104 people in 47 households.
