= Pol-e Ushan =

Pol-e Ushan پل اوشن
- Village
- Location within Iran
- Coordinates: 36°20′21″N 51°15′32″E
- Country: Iran
- Province: Mazandaran
- County: Chalus
- Bakhsh: Marzanabad
- Rural District: Kuhestan

Population (2016)
  - Total: 126
- Time zone: UTC+3:30 (IRST)

Pol-e Ushan (Persian: پل اوشن, also Romanized as Pol-e Ūshan and Polowshan; also known as Pol-e Āshan) is a village in Kuhestan Rural District of Chalus County, Mazandaran Province, Iran.

At the time of the 2006 National Census, the village's population was 82 in 17 households, when it was in the former Kelardasht District. The following census in 2011 counted 164 people in 58 households, by which time the rural district had been separated from the district in the formation of Marzanabad District. The 2016 census measured the population of the village as 126 people in 50 households.
