= Laru Sar =

Laru Sar لاروسر
- Village
- Location within Iran
- Coordinates: 36°22′02″N 51°17′58″E
- Country: Iran
- Province: Mazandaran
- County: Chalus
- Bakhsh: Marzanabad
- Rural District: Kuhestan

Population (2016)
  - Total: 86
- Time zone: UTC+3:30 (IRST)

Laru Sar (Persian: لاروسر, also Romanized as Lārū Sar) is a village in Kuhestan Rural District, Marzanabad District, Chalus County, Mazandaran Province, Iran.

At the time of the 2006 National Census, the village's population was 43 in 12 households, when it was in the former Kelardasht District. The following census in 2011 counted 38 people in 11 households, by which time the rural district had been separated from the district in the formation of Marzanabad District. The 2016 census measured the population of the village as 86 people in 29 households.
