= Likar =

Likar ليكر
- Village
- Location within Iran
- Coordinates: 36°24′10″N 51°14′23″E
- Country: Iran
- Province: Mazandaran
- County: Chalus
- Bakhsh: Marzanabad District
- Rural District: Kuhestan

Population (2016)
  - Total: 154
- Time zone: UTC+3:30 (IRST)

Likar (Persian: ليكر, also Romanized as Līkar; also known as Līkar Kolā) is a village in Kuhestan Rural District, Marzanabad District, Chalus County, Mazandaran Province, Iran.

At the time of the 2006 National Census, the village's population was 155 in 41 households, when it was in the former Kelardasht District. The following census in 2011 counted 193 people in 59 households, by which time the rural district had been separated from the district in the formation of Marzanabad District. The 2016 census measured the population of the village as 154 people in 45 households.
