= Taleh, Mazandaran =

Taleh تله
- Village
- Location within Iran
- Coordinates: 36°22′33″N 51°11′57″E
- Country: Iran
- Province: Mazandaran
- County: Chalus
- Bakhsh: Marzanabad
- Rural District: Kuhestan

Population (2016)
  - Total: 129
- Time zone: UTC+3:30 (IRST)

Taleh (Persian: تله; also known as Talī) is a village in Kuhestan Rural District of Chalus County, Mazandaran Province, Iran.

At the time of the 2006 National Census, the village's population was 151 in 37 households, when it was in the former Kelardasht District. The following census in 2011 counted 147 people in 43 households, by which time the rural district had been separated from the district in the formation of Marzanabad District. The 2016 census measured the population of the village as 129 people in 39 households.
