= Seyyed Kalam Sar =

Seyyed Kalam Sar سيدكلامسر
- Village
- Location within Iran
- Coordinates: 36°26′50″N 51°18′31″E
- Country: Iran
- Province: Mazandaran
- County: Chalus
- Bakhsh: Marzanabad
- Rural District: Kuhestan

Population (2016)
  - Total: 32
- Time zone: UTC+3:30 (IRST)

Seyyed Kalam Sar (Persian: سيدكلامسر, also Romanized as Seyyed Kalām Sar and Seyyed Kolāmsar) is a village in Kuhestan Rural District, Marzanabad District, Chalus County, Mazandaran Province, Iran.

At the time of the 2006 National Census, the village's population was 32 in 7 households, when it was in the former Kelardasht District. The following census in 2011 counted 49 people in 13 households, by which time the rural district had been separated from the district in the formation of Marzanabad District. The 2016 census measured the population of the village as 32 people in 9 households.
