= Michkar =

Michkar ميچكار
- Village
- Location within Iran
- Coordinates: 36°26′24″N 51°16′31″E
- Country: Iran
- Province: Mazandaran
- County: Chalus
- Bakhsh: Marzanabad
- Rural District: Kuhestan

Population (2016)
  - Total: 104
- Time zone: UTC+3:30 (IRST)

Michkar (Persian: ميچكار, also Romanized as Mīchkār; also known as Mīchar) is a village in Kuhestan Rural District, Marzanabad District, Chalus County, Mazandaran Province, Iran.

At the time of the 2006 National Census, the village's population was 109 in 45 households, when it was in the former Kelardasht District. The following census in 2011 counted 153 people in 72 households, by which time the rural district had been separated from the district in the formation of Marzanabad District. The 2016 census measured the population of the village as 104 people in 53 households.
