= Nater, Iran =

Village in Mazandaran province, Iran

Nater Persian: ناتر
- Village
- Location within Iran
- Coordinates: 36°21′00″N 51°09′40″E
- Country: Iran
- Province: Mazandaran
- County: Chalus
- District: Marzanabad
- Rural District: Kuhestan

Population (2016)
  - Total: 251
- Time zone: UTC+3:30 (IRST)

Nater (Persian: ناتر) (Note: Also romanized as Nāter) is a village in Kuhestan Rural District of Marzanabad District in Chalus County, Mazandaran province, Iran.

== Demographics ==
=== Population ===
At the time of the 2006 National Census, the village's population was 677 in 183 households, when it was in the former Kelardasht District. The following census in 2011 counted 490 people in 151 households, by which time the rural district had been separated from the district in the formation of Marzanabad District. The 2016 census measured the population of the village as 251 people in 91 households.
