= Pirajeh =

Pirajeh پی رجه
- Village
- Location within Iran
- Coordinates: 36°22′30″N 51°18′00″E
- Country: Iran
- Province: Mazandaran
- County: Chalus
- Bakhsh: Marzanabad
- Rural District: Kuhestan

Population (2016)
  - Total: 55
- Time zone: UTC+3:30 (IRST)

Pirajeh (Persian: پي رجه, also Romanized as Pīrajeh and Pīrājeh) is a village in Kuhestan Rural District of Chalus County, Mazandaran Province, Iran.

At the time of the 2006 National Census, the village's population was 21 in 8 households, when it was in the former Kelardasht District. The following census in 2011 counted 10 people in 6 households, by which time the rural district had been separated from the district in the formation of Marzanabad District. The 2016 census measured the population of the village as 55 people in 19 households.
