= Dozdband =

Dozdbon دزدبن
- Village
- Location within Iran
- Coordinates: 36°18′59″N 51°15′58″E
- Country: Iran
- Province: Mazandaran
- County: Chalus
- Bakhsh: Marzanabad
- Rural District: Kuhestan

Population (2016)
  - Total: 15
- Time zone: UTC+3:30 (IRST)

Dozdbon (Persian: دزدبن), also known as Dozdband(Persian: دزدبند) is a village in Kuhestan Rural District of Chalus County, Mazandaran Province, Iran.

At the time of the 2006 National Census, the village's population was 35 in 9 households, when it was in the former Kelardasht District. The following census in 2011 designated the village as a temporary settlement populated from April to November, by which time the rural district had been separated from the district in the formation of Marzanabad District. The 2016 census measured the population of the village as 15 people in 6 households.
