= Vaspul =

Vaspul واسپول
- Village
- Location within Iran
- Coordinates: 36°18′37″N 51°13′46″E
- Country: Iran
- Province: Mazandaran
- County: Chalus
- Bakhsh: Marzanabad
- Rural District: Kuhestan

Population (2011)
  - Total: 11
- Time zone: UTC+3:30 (IRST)

Vaspul (Persian: واسپول, also Romanized as Vāspūl) is a village in Kuhestan Rural District, Marzanabad District, Chalus County, Mazandaran Province, Iran.

At the time of the 2006 National Census, the village's population was 13 in 4 households, when it was in the former Kelardasht District. The following census in 2011 counted 11 people in 4 households, by which time the rural district had been separated from the district in the formation of Marzanabad District. The 2016 census measured less than 4 households.
