= Mijlar =

Mijlar ميجلار
- Village
- Location within Iran
- Coordinates: 36°22′51″N 51°16′43″E
- Country: Iran
- Province: Mazandaran
- County: Chalus
- Bakhsh: Marzanabad
- Rural District: Kuhestan

Population (2016)
  - Total: 69
- Time zone: UTC+3:30 (IRST)

Mijlar (Persian: ميجلار, also Romanized as Mījlār; also known as Mejel and Mejlār) is a village in Kuhestan Rural District, Marzanabad District, Chalus County, Mazandaran Province, Iran.

At the time of the 2006 National Census, the village's population was 85 in 27 households, when it was in the former Kelardasht District. The following census in 2011 counted 83 people in 29 households, by which time the rural district had been separated from the district in the formation of Marzanabad District. The 2016 census measured the population of the village as 69 people in 30 households.
