= Valiabad, Chalus =

Village in Mazandaran province, Iran

Valiabad Persian: ولی آباد
- Village
- Location within Iran
- Coordinates: 36°15′07″N 51°18′06″E
- Country: Iran
- Province: Mazandaran
- County: Chalus
- District: Marzanabad
- Rural District: Kuhestan

Population (2016)
  - Total: 275
- Time zone: UTC+3:30 (IRST)

Valiabad (Persian: ولی‌آباد) (Note: Also romanized as Valīābād and Wāliābād) is a village in Kuhestan Rural District of Marzanabad District in Chalus County, Mazandaran province, Iran.

== Demographics ==
=== Population ===
At the time of the 2006 National Census, the village's population was 271 in 66 households, when it was in the former Kelardasht District. The following census in 2011 counted 274 people in 86 households, by which time the rural district had been separated from the district in the formation of Marzanabad District. The 2016 census measured the population of the village as 275 people in 96 households.
