= Dalir =

Village in Mazandaran province, Iran

Dalir Persian: دلير
- Village
- Location within Iran
- Coordinates: 36°19′34″N 51°05′39″E
- Country: Iran
- Province: Mazandaran
- County: Chalus
- District: Marzanabad
- Rural District: Kuhestan

Population (2016)
  - Total: 568
- Time zone: UTC+3:30 (IRST)

Dalir (Persian: دلير) (Note: Also romanized as Dalīr and Delīr) is a village in Kuhestan Rural District of Marzanabad District in Chalus County, Mazandaran province, Iran.

== Demographics ==
=== Population ===
At the time of the 2006 National Census, the village's population was 310 in 79 households, when it was in the former Kelardasht District. The following census in 2011 counted 364 people in 115 households, by which time the rural district had been separated from the district in the formation of Marzanabad District. The 2016 census measured the population of the village as 568 people in 186 households. It was the most populous village in its rural district.
