= Feshkur =

Village in Mazandaran province, Iran

Feshkur Persian: فشكور
- Village
- Location within Iran
- Coordinates: 36°21′27″N 51°12′03″E
- Country: Iran
- Province: Mazandaran
- County: Chalus
- District: Marzanabad
- Rural District: Kuhestan

Population (2016)
  - Total: 230
- Time zone: UTC+3:30 (IRST)

Feshkur (Persian: فشكور) (Note: Also romanized as Fashkūr and Feshkūr; also known as Fishkūr and Pashkur) is a village in Kuhestan Rural District of Marzanabad District in Chalus County, Mazandaran province, Iran.

== Demographics ==
=== Population ===
At the time of the 2006 National Census, the village's population was 90 in 22 households, when it was in the former Kelardasht District. The following census in 2011 counted 349 people in 115 households, by which time the rural district had been separated from the district in the formation of Marzanabad District. The 2016 census measured the population of the village as 230 people in 96 households.
