= Pulad Kuh Sar =

Pulad Kuh Sar پولادكوه سر
- Village
- Location within Iran
- Coordinates: 36°17′15″N 51°10′28″E
- Country: Iran
- Province: Mazandaran
- County: Chalus
- Bakhsh: Marzanabad
- Rural District: Kuhestan

Population (2016)
  - Total: 40
- Time zone: UTC+3:30 (IRST)

Pulad Kuh Sar (Persian: پولادكوه سر, also Romanized as Pūlād Kūh Sar) is a village in Kuhestan Rural District of Chalus County, Mazandaran Province, Iran.

At the time of the 2006 National Census, the village's population was 85 in 20 households, when it was in the former Kelardasht District. The following census in 2011 counted 30 people in 9 households, by which time the rural district had been separated from the district in the formation of Marzanabad District. The 2016 census measured the population of the village as 40 people in 13 households.
