= Eshkarlet =

Eshkarlet اشكارلت
- Village
- Location within Iran
- Coordinates: 36°25′08″N 51°18′47″E
- Country: Iran
- Province: Mazandaran
- County: Chalus
- Bakhsh: Marzanabad
- Rural District: Kuhestan

Population (2016)
  - Total: 39
- Time zone: UTC+3:30 (IRST)

Eshkarlet (Persian: اشكارلت, also Romanized as Eshkārlet and Āshkārlet; also known as Eshkālī and Eshkārlīt) is a village in Kuhestan Rural District, Marzanabad District, Chalus County, Mazandaran Province, Iran.

At the time of the 2006 National Census, the village's population was 30 in 10 households, when it was in the former Kelardasht District. The following census in 2011 counted 10 people in 5 households, by which time the rural district had been separated from the district in the formation of Marzanabad District. The 2016 census measured the population of the village as 39 people in 15 households.
