= Golamreh =

Golamreh گلامره
- Village
- Location within Iran
- Coordinates: 36°24′54″N 51°10′25″E
- Country: Iran
- Province: Mazandaran
- County: Chalus
- Bakhsh: Marzanabad
- Rural District: Birun Bashm

Population (2016)
  - Total: 101
- Time zone: UTC+3:30 (IRST)

Golamreh (Persian: گلامره, also Romanized as Golāmreh) is a village in Birun Bashm Rural District, Marzanabad District, Chalus County, Mazandaran Province, Iran.

At the time of the 2006 National Census, the village's population was 115 in 28 households. The following census in 2011 counted 72 people in 26 households. The 2016 census measured the population of the village as 101 people in 36 households.
