= Pulad Kuh =

Pulad Kuh پولادكوه
- Village
- Location within Iran
- Coordinates: 36°18′00″N 51°12′00″E
- Country: Iran
- Province: Mazandaran
- County: Chalus
- Bakhsh: Marzanabad
- Rural District: Kuhestan

Population (2011)
  - Total: 20
- Time zone: UTC+3:30 (IRST)

Pulad Kuh (Persian: پولادكوه, also Romanized as Pūlād Kūh) is a village in Kuhestan Rural District of Chalus County, Mazandaran Province, Iran.

At the time of the 2006 National Census, the village's population was 13 in 5 households, when it was in the former Kelardasht District. The following census in 2011 counted 20 people in 8 households, by which time the rural district had been separated from the district in the formation of Marzanabad District. The 2016 census measured less than 4 households.
