= Masal, Mazandaran =

Masal ماسال
- Village
- Location within Iran
- Coordinates: 36°25′34″N 51°17′10″E
- Country: Iran
- Province: Mazandaran
- County: Chalus
- Bakhsh: Marzanabad
- Rural District: Kuhestan

Population (2016)
  - Total: 131
- Time zone: UTC+3:30 (IRST)

Masal (Persian: ماسال, also Romanized as Māsāl) is a village in Kuhestan Rural District, Marzanabad District, Chalus County, Mazandaran Province, Iran.

At the time of the 2006 National Census, the village's population was 80 in 19 households, when it was in the former Kelardasht District. The following census in 2011 counted 134 people in 38 households, by which time the rural district had been separated from the district in the formation of Marzanabad District. The 2016 census measured the population of the village as 131 people in 47 households.
