= Maka Rud, Kuhestan =

Village in Mazandaran province, Iran

Maka Rud Persian: مكارود
- Village
- Location within Iran
- Coordinates: 36°20′53″N 51°15′34″E
- Country: Iran
- Province: Mazandaran
- County: Chalus
- District: Marzanabad
- Rural District: Kuhestan

Population (2016)
  - Total: 208
- Time zone: UTC+3:30 (IRST)

Maka Rud (Persian: مكارود) (Note: Also romanized as Makā Rūd) is a village in Kuhestan Rural District of Marzanabad District in Chalus County, Mazandaran province, Iran.

== Demographics ==
=== Population ===
At the time of the 2006 National Census, the village's population was 90 in 26 households, when it was in the former Kelardasht District. The following census in 2011 counted 84 people in 24 households, by which time the rural district had been separated from the district in the formation of Marzanabad District. The 2016 census measured the population of the village as 208 people in 71 households.
