= Sirgah =

Village in Mazandaran province, Iran

Sirgah Persian: سيرگاه
- Village
- Location within Iran
- Coordinates: 36°28′36″N 51°15′19″E
- Country: Iran
- Province: Mazandaran
- County: Chalus
- District: Marzanabad
- Rural District: Birun Bashm

Population (2016)
  - Total: 268
- Time zone: UTC+3:30 (IRST)

Sirgah (Persian: سيرگاه) (Note: Also romanized as Seīrgāh and Sīrgāh) is a village in Birun Bashm Rural District of Marzanabad District in Chalus County, Mazandaran province, Iran.

== Demographics ==
=== Population ===
At the time of the 2006 National Census, the village's population was 48 in 14 households, when it was in the former Kelardasht District. The following census in 2011 counted 232 people in 70 households, by which time the rural district had been separated from the district in the formation of Marzanabad District. The 2016 census measured the population of the village as 268 people in 94 households.
