= Guytar-e Olya =

Guytar-e Olya گوي تر عليا
- Neighborhood, former village
- Location within Iran
- Coordinates: 36°29′42″N 51°15′57″E
- Country: Iran
- Province: Mazandaran
- County: Chalus
- Bakhsh: Marzanabad
- Rural District: Birun Bashm
- Village: Guytar

Population (2011)
  - Total: 399
- Time zone: UTC+3:30 (IRST)

Guytar-e Olya (Persian: گوي تر عليا, also Romanized as Gūytar-e ‘Olyā) is a neighborhood in the village of Guytar in Chalus County of Mazandaran Province, Iran.

Formerly it was a separate village in Birun Bashm Rural District of Marzanabad District, At the 2006 census, its population was 474, in 120 families. Down to 399 people in 129 households at the 2011 census.
