= Matka-ye Rudbar =

Village in Mazandaran province, Iran

Matka-ye Rudbar Persian: متكارودبار
- Village
- Location within Iran
- Coordinates: 36°27′44″N 51°18′44″E
- Country: Iran
- Province: Mazandaran
- County: Chalus
- District: Marzanabad
- Rural District: Kuhestan

Population (2016)
  - Total: 287
- Time zone: UTC+3:30 (IRST)

Matka-ye Rudbar (Persian: متكارودبار) (Note: Also romanized as Matkā-ye Rūdbār) is a village in Kuhestan Rural District of Marzanabad District in Chalus County, Mazandaran province, Iran.

== Demographics ==
=== Population ===
At the time of the 2006 National Census, the village's population was 209 in 53 households, when it was in the former Kelardasht District. The following census in 2011 counted 261 people in 72 households, by which time the rural district had been separated from the district in the formation of Marzanabad District. The 2016 census measured the population of the village as 287 people in 84 households.
