= Makar, Iran =

Makar مكار
- Village
- Location within Iran
- Coordinates: 36°21′48″N 51°13′52″E
- Country: Iran
- Province: Mazandaran
- County: Chalus
- Bakhsh: Marzanabad
- Rural District: Kuhestan

Population (2016)
  - Total: 61
- Time zone: UTC+3:30 (IRST)

Makar (Persian: مكار, also Romanized as Makār) is a village in Kuhestan Rural District, Marzanabad District, Chalus County, Mazandaran Province, Iran.

At the time of the 2006 National Census, the village's population was 126 in 32 households, when it was in the former Kelardasht District. The following census in 2011 counted 34 people in 10 households, by which time the rural district had been separated from the district in the formation of Marzanabad District. The 2016 census measured the population of the village as 61 people in 23 households.
