= Karimabad, Kelardasht =

Karimabad كريم آباد
- Village
- Location within Iran
- Coordinates: 36°24′00″N 51°18′46″E
- Country: Iran
- Province: Mazandaran
- County: Chalus
- Bakhsh: Marzanabad
- Rural District: Kuhestan

Population (2006)
  - Total: 12
- Time zone: UTC+3:30 (IRST)

Karimabad (Persian: كريم آباد, also Romanized as Karīmābād) is a village in Kuhestan Rural District, Marzanabad District, Chalus County, Mazandaran Province, Iran.

At the time of the 2006 National Census, the village's population was 12 in 4 households, when it was in the former Kelardasht District. The following census results in 2011 and 2016 counted less than 4 households, by which time the rural district had been separated from the district in the formation of Marzanabad District.
