= Nukres =

Nukres نوكرس
- Village
- Location within Iran
- Coordinates: 36°19′14″N 51°11′07″E
- Country: Iran
- Province: Mazandaran
- County: Chalus
- Bakhsh: Marzanabad
- Rural District: Kuhestan

Population (2016)
  - Total: 116
- Time zone: UTC+3:30 (IRST)

Nukres (Persian: نوكرس, also Romanized as Nūkres; also known as Nūkrās) is a village in Kuhestan Rural District, Marzanabad District, Chalus County, Mazandaran Province, Iran.

At the time of the 2006 National Census, the village's population was 143 in 39 households, when it was in the former Kelardasht District. The following census in 2011 counted 24 people in 9 households, by which time the rural district had been separated from the district in the formation of Marzanabad District. The 2016 census measured the population of the village as 116 people in 39 households.
