= Pardangun =

Village in Mazandaran province, Iran

Pardangun Persian: پردن گون
- Village
- Location within Iran
- Coordinates: 36°28′01″N 51°15′59″E
- Country: Iran
- Province: Mazandaran
- County: Chalus
- District: Marzanabad
- Rural District: Birun Bashm

Population (2016)
  - Total: 667
- Time zone: UTC+3:30 (IRST)

Pardangun (Persian: پردن گون) (Note: Also romanized as Pardangūn; also known as Pardangān) is a village in Birun Bashm Rural District of Marzanabad District in Chalus County, Mazandaran province, Iran.

== Demographics ==
=== Population ===
At the time of the 2006 National Census, the village's population was 971 in 252 households, when it was in the former Kelardasht District. The following census in 2011 counted 1,015 people in 322 households, by which time the rural district had been separated from the district in the formation of Marzanabad District. The 2016 census measured the population of the village as 667 people in 227 households.
