= Gol Gah =

Gol Gah (Persian: گل گاه) may refer to:

- Gol Gah, Fars
- Gol Gah, Mazandaran
