= Kordi Chal =

Village in Mazandaran province, Iran

Kordi Chal Persian: کردیچال
- Village
- Location within Iran
- Coordinates: 36°31′48″N 51°13′46″E
- Country: Iran
- Province: Mazandaran
- County: Kelardasht
- District: Central
- Rural District: Kelardasht-e Sharqi

Population (2016)
  - Total: 1,566
- Time zone: UTC+3:30 (IRST)

Kordi Chal (Persian: کردیچال) (Note: Also romanized as Kordī Chāl; also known as Kodī Chāl, Kodīchāl, Kolī Chāl, and Kurdichal) is a village in, and the capital of, Kelardasht-e Sharqi Rural District (Note: Formerly Kelardasht Rural District) in the Central District of Kelardasht County, (Note: Formerly Kelardasht District of Chalus County) Mazandaran province, Iran.

== Demographics ==
=== Population ===
At the time of the 2006 National Census, the village's population was 1,466 in 435 households, when it was in Kelardasht Rural District (Note: Renamed Kelardasht-e Sharqi Rural District) of Kelardasht District (Note: Renamed Kelardasht County) in Chalus County. The following census in 2011 counted 1,447 people in 451 households, by which time the rural district had been renamed Kelardasht-e Sharqi Rural District. The 2016 census measured the population of the village as 1,566 people in 531 households, when the district had been transformed into Kelardasht County. Kordi Chal was the most populous village in its rural district.
