= Khoshk Darreh =

Khoshk Darreh (Persian: خشكدره), also known as Khoshkeh Darreh, may refer to:

- Khoshk Darreh, Afghanistan
- Khoshk Darreh, Chalus, Iran
