= Var Kola, Chalus =

Var Kola وركلا
- Village
- Location within Iran
- Coordinates: 36°13′01″N 51°17′39″E
- Country: Iran
- Province: Mazandaran
- County: Chalus
- Bakhsh: Marzanabad
- Rural District: Kuhestan

Population (2016)
  - Total: 86
- Time zone: UTC+3:30 (IRST)

Var Kola (Persian: وركلا, also Romanized as Var Kolā; also known as Varkelū) is a village in Kuhestan Rural District, Marzanabad District, Chalus County, Mazandaran Province, Iran.

At the time of the 2006 National Census, the village's population was 21 in 5 households, when it was in the former Kelardasht District. The following census in 2011 counted 69 people in 23 households, by which time the rural district had been separated from the district in the formation of Marzanabad District. The 2016 census measured the population of the village as 86 people in 32 households.
