= Dimu =

Dimu or Dimow or Dimaow (Persian: ديمو) may refer to:

- Dimu, Khuzestan
- Dimu, Mazandaran
