= Banafsheh Deh, Chalus =

Village in Mazandaran province, Iran

Banafsheh Deh Persian: بنفشه ده
- Village
- Location within Iran
- Coordinates: 36°29′59″N 51°15′00″E
- Country: Iran
- Province: Mazandaran
- County: Chalus
- District: Marzanabad
- Rural District: Birun Bashm

Population (2016)
  - Total: 231
- Time zone: UTC+3:30 (IRST)

Banafsheh Deh (Persian: بنفشه ده) is a village in Birun Bashm Rural District of Marzanabad District in Chalus County, Mazandaran province, Iran.

== Demographics ==
=== Population ===
At the time of the 2006 National Census, the village's population was 184 in 56 households, when it was in the former Kelardasht District. The following census in 2011 counted 130 people in 45 households, by which time the rural district had been separated from the district in the formation of Marzanabad District. The 2016 census measured the population of the village as 231 people in 89 households.
