= Bandar-e Sofla, Mazandaran =

Bandar-e Sofla باندرسفلی
- Village
- Location within Iran
- Coordinates: 36°26′00″N 51°19′16″E
- Country: Iran
- Province: Mazandaran
- County: Chalus
- Bakhsh: Marzanabad
- Rural District: Kuhestan

Population (2016)
  - Total: 136
- Time zone: UTC+3:30 (IRST)

Bandar-e Sofla (Persian: باندر سفلی, also Romanized as Bāndar-e Soflá and Bondar-e Soflá; also known as Bondar-e Pā’īn and Bondar Pā’īn) is a village in Kuhestan Rural District, Marzanabad District, Chalus County, Mazandaran Province, Iran.

At the time of the 2006 National Census, the village's population was 132 in 42 households, when it was in the former Kelardasht District. The following census in 2011 counted 43 people in 21 households, by which time the rural district had been separated from the district in the formation of Marzanabad District. The 2016 census measured the population of the village as 136 people in 55 households.
