= Kelarak =

Kelarak (Persian: كلارك) may refer to:

- Kelarak, Birun Bashm
- Kelarak, Kuhestan
