= Kelarak, Birun Bashm =

Kelarak کلارک, کلاک
- Village
- Location within Iran
- Coordinates: 36°27′49″N 51°15′27″E
- Country: Iran
- Province: Mazandaran
- County: Chalus
- Bakhsh: Marzanabad
- Rural District: Birun Bashm

Population (2016)
  - Total: 196
- Time zone: UTC+3:30 (IRST)

Kelarak (Persian: کلارک, also Romanized as Kelārak; also known as Kalāk) is a village in Birun Bashm Rural District, Marzanabad District, Chalus County, Mazandaran Province, Iran. At the 2016 census, its population was 196, in 70 families. Increased from 85 people in 2006.
