= Dimu, Mazandaran =

Dimu ديمو
- Village
- Location within Iran
- Coordinates: 36°33′26″N 51°17′26″E
- Country: Iran
- Province: Mazandaran
- County: Chalus
- Bakhsh: Marzanabad
- Rural District: Birun Bashm

Population (2016)
  - Total: 152
- Time zone: UTC+3:30 (IRST)

Dimu (Persian: ديمو, also Romanized as Dīmū) is a village in Birun Bashm Rural District, Marzanabad District, Chalus County, Mazandaran Province, Iran.

At the time of the 2006 National Census, the village's population was 91. The following census in 2011 counted 46 people in 18 households. The 2016 census measured the population of the village as 152 people in 53 households.
