= Panjak =

Panjak may refer to:

- Panjak, Trstenik, a village in central Serbia
- Panjak, Užice, a village in western Serbia
- Villages in Iran:
- Panjak, Mazandaran, a village in Chalus County
- Panjak, Sistan and Baluchestan, a village in Sistan and Baluchestan Province
