= Harijan, Iran =

Harijan هريجان
- Village
- Location within Iran
- Coordinates: 36°14′26″N 51°19′17″E
- Country: Iran
- Province: Mazandaran
- County: Chalus
- Bakhsh: Marzanabad
- Rural District: Kuhestan

Population (2016)
  - Total: 198
- Time zone: UTC+3:30 (IRST)

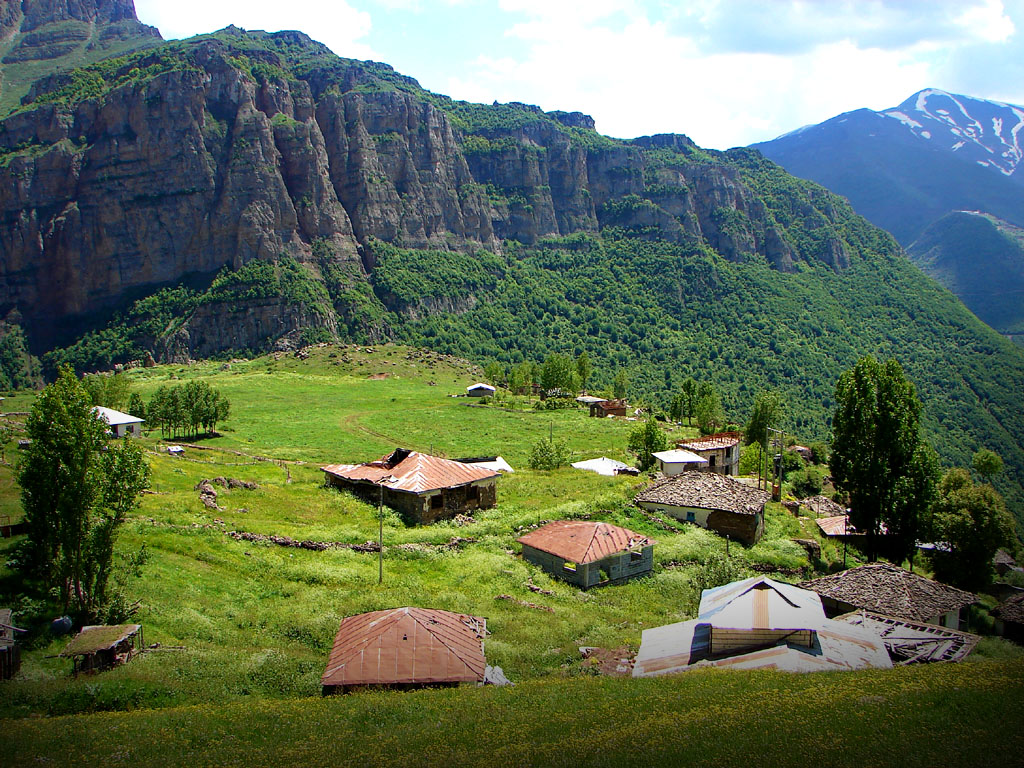

Harijan (Persian: هريجان, also Romanized as Harījān) is a village in Kuhestan Rural District, in Marzanabad District of Chalus County, Mazandaran Province, Iran. At the 2016 census, its population was 198, in 65 families.
