= Tavar =

Tavar (Persian: تاور or توار may refer to:

- Tavar, Lorestan (تاور - Tāvar)
- Tavar, Mazandaran (توار - Tavār)
- Tavar, North Khorasan (توار - Tavār)
