= Kelarak, Kuhestan =

Kelarak کلارک
- Village
- Location within Iran
- Coordinates: 36°16′17″N 51°15′19″E
- Country: Iran
- Province: Mazandaran
- County: Chalus
- Bakhsh: Marzanabad
- Rural District: Kuhestan

Population (2016)
  - Total: 69
- Time zone: UTC+3:30 (IRST)

Kelarak (Persian: کلارک, also Romanized as Kelārak) is a village in Kuhestan Rural District, Marzanabad District, Chalus County, Mazandaran Province, Iran.

At the time of the 2006 National Census, the village's population was 34 in 8 households, when it was in the former Kelardasht District. The following census in 2011 counted 55 people in 22 households, by which time the rural district had been separated from the district in the formation of Marzanabad District. The 2016 census measured the population of the village as 69 people in 23 households.
