= Golkah =

Village in Mazandaran province, Iran

Golkah Persian: گل كاه
- Village
- Location within Iran
- Coordinates: 36°28′55″N 51°16′17″E
- Country: Iran
- Province: Mazandaran
- County: Chalus
- District: Marzanabad
- Rural District: Birun Bashm

Population (2016)
  - Total: 276
- Time zone: UTC+3:30 (IRST)

Golkah (Persian: گل كاه) (Note: Also romanized as Golkāh; also known as Gol Gāh) is a village in Birun Bashm Rural District of Marzanabad District in Chalus County, Mazandaran province, Iran.

== Demographics ==
=== Population ===
At the time of the 2006 National Census, the village's population was 128 in 30 households, when it was in the former Kelardasht District. The following census in 2011 counted 184 people in 52 households, by which time the rural district had been separated from the district in the formation of Marzanabad District. The 2016 census measured the population of the village as 276 people in 96 households.
