= Khoshk Darreh, Chalus =

Khoshk Darreh خشكدره
- Village
- Location within Iran
- Coordinates: 36°29′01″N 51°15′22″E
- Country: Iran
- Province: Mazandaran
- County: Chalus
- Bakhsh: Marzanabad
- Rural District: Birun Bashm

Population (2016)
  - Total: 74
- Time zone: UTC+3:30 (IRST)

Khoshk Darreh (Persian: خشكدره; also known as Khoshkeh Darreh) is a village in Birun Bashm Rural District, in Marzanabad District of Chalus County, Mazandaran Province, Iran.

At the time of the 2006 National Census, the village's population was 13 in 6 households. The following census in 2011 counted 12 people in 5 households. The 2016 census measured the population of the village as 74 people in 33 households.
