= Tuvir =

Village in Mazandaran province, Iran

Tuvir Persian: طوير
- Village
- Location within Iran
- Coordinates: 36°23′36″N 51°15′53″E
- Country: Iran
- Province: Mazandaran
- County: Chalus
- District: Marzanabad
- Rural District: Kuhestan

Population (2016)
  - Total: 519
- Time zone: UTC+3:30 (IRST)

Tuvir (Persian: طوير) (Note: Also romanized as Ţowvīr and Tuvīr; also known as Tavār, Ţavīr, Tovir, Ţovīr, and Tovīr) is a village in, and the capital of, Kuhestan Rural District in Marzanabad District of Chalus County, Mazandaran province, Iran.

== Demographics ==
=== Population ===
At the time of the 2006 National Census, the village's population was 329 in 91 households, when it was in the former Kelardasht District. The following census in 2011 counted 253 people in 77 households, by which time the rural district had been separated from the district in the formation of Marzanabad District. The 2016 census measured the population of the village as 519 people in 219 households.
