= Guytar =

Guytar (Persian: گوئ تر) may refer to:

- Guytar-e Olya
- Guytar-e Sofla
