= Banafsheh Deh =

Banafsheh Deh (Persian: بنفشه ده) may refer to:

- Banafsheh Deh, Chalus
- Banafsheh Deh, Nur
