= Panjak, Iran =

Panjak (Persian: پنجك) in Iran, may refer to:

- Panjak, Mazandaran, a village in Chalus County
- Panjak, Sistan and Baluchestan, a village in Sistan and Baluchestan Province

== See also ==
- Panjak-e Rastaq Rural District, Mazandaran
