= Taeb =

Taeb may refer to:

- Taeb Kola, a village in Iran
- Hossein Taeb (born 1963), an Iranian Shia cleric
