= Dehnar, Mazandaran =

Dehnar دهنار
- Village
- Location within Iran
- Coordinates: 36°24′00″N 51°16′00″E
- Country: Iran
- Province: Mazandaran
- County: Chalus
- Bakhsh: Marzanabad
- Rural District: Kuhestan

Population (2016)
  - Total: 60
- Time zone: UTC+3:30 (IRST)

Dehnar (Persian: دهنار, also Romanized as Dehnār) is a village in Kuhestan Rural District, Marzanabad District, Chalus County, Mazandaran Province, Iran. At the 2016 census, its population was 60, in 28 families. Up from 16 families in 2006.
