= Largan =

Largan or Laregan (Persian: لرگان or لارگان) may refer to:

- Largan, Isfahan (لارگان - Lārgān)
- Largan, Chalus (لرگان - Largān), Mazandaran Province
- Largan, Nowshahr (لرگان - Largān), Mazandaran Province
