= Dehnar =

Dehnar (Persian: دهنار) may refer to:

- Dehnar, Mazandaran
- Dehnar, Tehran
