= Guytar, Iran =

Village in Mazandaran province, Iran

Guytar Persian: گوئ تر
- Village
- Location within Iran
- Coordinates: 36°29′28″N 51°15′39″E
- Country: Iran
- Province: Mazandaran
- County: Chalus
- District: Marzanabad
- Rural District: Birun Bashm

Population (2016)
  - Total: 1,307
- Time zone: UTC+3:30 (IRST)

Guytar (Persian: گوئ تر) (Note: Also romanized as Gūytar; formerly known as Guytar-e Sofla (گوئ ترسفلي), also romanized as Gūytar-e Soflá) is a village in, and the capital of, Birun Bashm Rural District in Marzanabad District of Chalus County, Mazandaran province, Iran.

== Demographics ==
=== Population ===
At the time of the 2006 National Census, the village's population was 682 in 165 households, when it was in the former Kelardasht District and listed as Guytar-e Sofla. The following census in 2011 counted 964 people in 295 households, by which time the rural district had been separated from the district in the formation of Marzanabad District. The 2016 census measured the population of the village as 1,307 people in 431 households, when it was listed as Guytar. It was the most populous village in its rural district.
