= Siah Bisheh, Chalus =

Siah Bisheh سياه بيشه
- Village
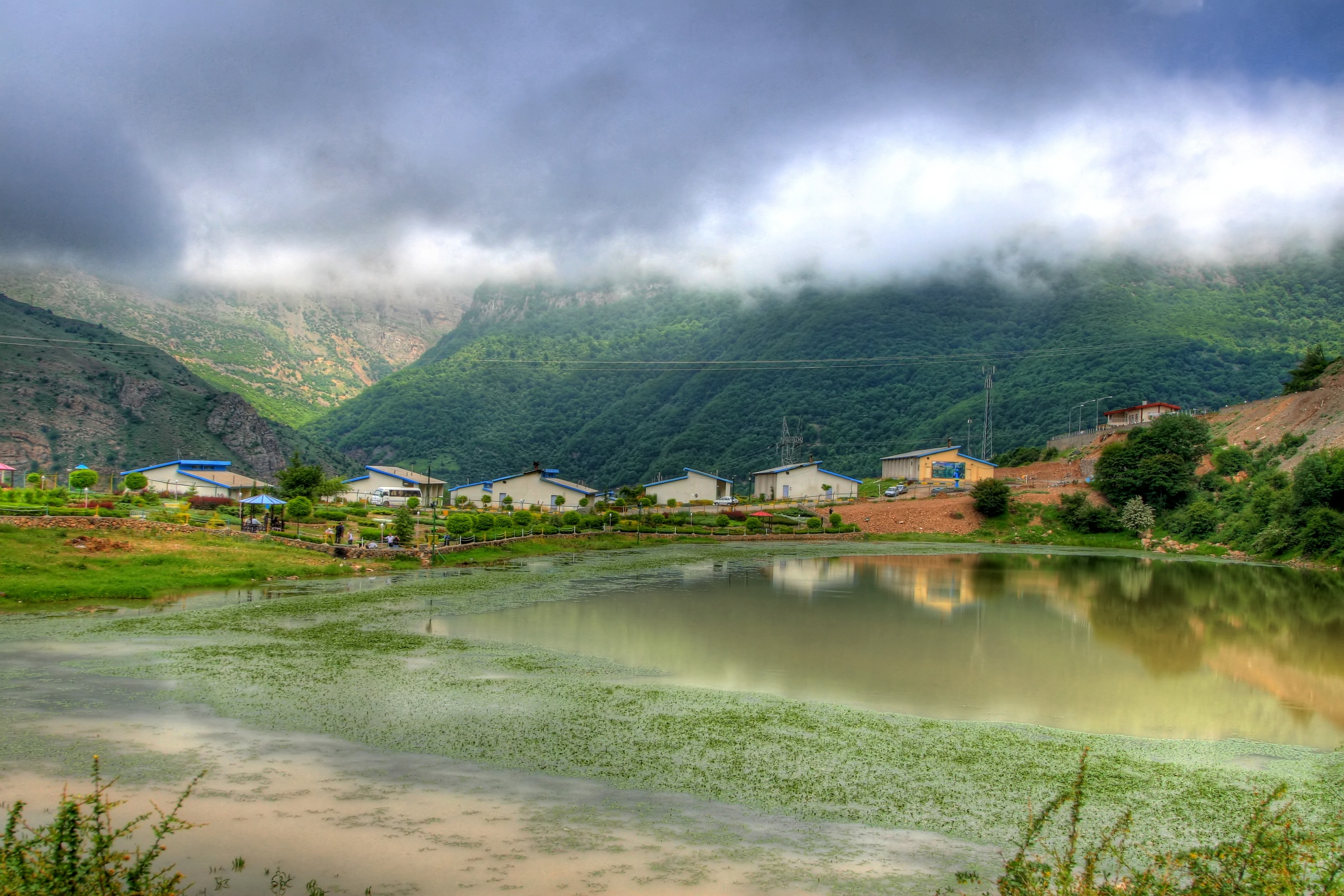

- Location within Iran
- Coordinates: 36°12′47″N 51°18′52″E
- Country: Iran
- Province: Mazandaran
- County: Chalus
- Bakhsh: Marzanabad
- Rural District: Kuhestan

Population (2016)
  - Total: 159
- Time zone: UTC+3:30 (IRST)

Siah Bisheh (Persian: سياه بيشه, also romanized as Sīāh Bīsheh) is a village in Kuhestan Rural District, Marzanabad District, Chalus County, Mazandaran Province, Iran. At the 2006 census, its population was 32 (11 families in total). in 2016, there were 159 residents in 60 households.

== Climate ==
Climate data for Siah Bisheh (elevation:1855.4m)(1999-2010)
Month	Jan	Feb	Mar	Apr	May	Jun	Jul	Aug	Sep	Oct	Nov	Dec	Year
Mean daily maximum °C (°F)	4.5 (40.1)	6.5 (43.7)	10.7 (51.3)	14.7 (58.5)	18.7 (65.7)	22.0 (71.6)	22.9 (73.2)	24.5 (76.1)	21.6 (70.9)	17.8 (64.0)	10.3 (50.5)	6.6 (43.9)	15.1 (59.1)
Daily mean °C (°F)	0.7 (33.3)	2.5 (36.5)	6.1 (43.0)	10.1 (50.2)	13.8 (56.8)	17.2 (63.0)	18.6 (65.5)	19.9 (67.8)	17.0 (62.6)	13.4 (56.1)	6.5 (43.7)	2.9 (37.2)	10.7 (51.3)
Mean daily minimum °C (°F)	−3.1 (26.4)	−1.6 (29.1)	1.6 (34.9)	5.5 (41.9)	8.9 (48.0)	12.4 (54.3)	14.3 (57.7)	15.3 (59.5)	12.4 (54.3)	9.1 (48.4)	2.7 (36.9)	−0.8 (30.6)	6.4 (43.5)
Average precipitation mm (inches)	40.3 (1.59)	51.6 (2.03)	75.4 (2.97)	71.8 (2.83)	38.6 (1.52)	16.3 (0.64)	22.8 (0.90)	16.3 (0.64)	17.4 (0.69)	35.8 (1.41)	64.4 (2.54)	57.8 (2.28)	508.5 (20.04)
Average relative humidity (%)	57	56	55	58	64	69	77	68	67	60	61	58	63
Source: IRIMO
