= Bandar-e Sofla =

Bandar-e Sofla (Persian: باندرسفلي) may refer to:

- Bandar-e Sofla, Kermanshah
- Bandar-e Sofla, Mazandaran
