= Var Kola =

Var Kola or Var Kala (Persian: وركلا) may refer to:

- Var Kola, Chalus
- Var Kola, Miandorud
