= Pey Qaleh =

Pey Qaleh (Persian: پي قلعه) may refer to:

- Pey Qaleh, Mazandaran
- Pey Qaleh, West Azerbaijan
