= Panjak, Mazandaran =

Panjak پنجک
- Village
- Location within Iran
- Coordinates: 36°23′28″N 51°18′05″E
- Country: Iran
- Province: Mazandaran
- County: Chalus
- Bakhsh: Marzanabad
- Rural District: Kuhestan

Population (2016)
  - Total: 106
- Time zone: UTC+3:30 (IRST)

Panjak (Persian: پنجک) is a village in Kuhestan Rural District of Chalus County, Mazandaran Province, Iran.

At the time of the 2006 National Census, the village's population was 122 in 40 households, when it was in the former Kelardasht District. The following census in 2011 counted 55 people in 24 households, by which time the rural district had been separated from the district in the formation of Marzanabad District. The 2016 census measured the population of the village as 106 people in 33 households.
