= Kelardasht-e Gharbi Rural District =

Rural district in Mazandaran province, Iran

Kelardasht-e Gharbi Rural District Persian: دهستان کلاردشت غربی
- Rural District
- Location within Iran
- Coordinates: 36°25′N 51°05′E
- Country: Iran
- Province: Mazandaran
- County: Kelardasht
- District: Central
- Established: 2010
- Capital: Vahed

Population (2016)
  - Total: 6,501
- Time zone: UTC+3:30 (IRST)

Kelardasht-e Gharbi Rural District (Persian: دهستان کلاردشت غربی) (Note: English: Western Kelardasht Rural District) is in the Central District of Kelardasht County, (Note: Formerly Kelardasht District of Chalus County) Mazandaran province, Iran. Its capital is the village of Vahed.

== History ==
Kelardasht-e Gharbi Rural District was created in Kelardasht District of Chalus County in 2010.

== Demographics ==
=== Population ===
At the time of the 2011 National Census, the rural district's population (as a part of Kelardasht District in Chalus County) was 5,145 inhabitants in 1,603 households. The 2016 census measured the population of the rural district as 6,501 in 2,220 households, by which time the district had been transformed into Kelardasht County. The most populous of its 18 villages was Pishanbur, with 1,849 people.

=== Other villages in the rural district ===
- Avijdan
- Bazar Sar
- Kord Mahalleh
- Lashsar
- Makarud
- Peyambur
- Taeb Kola
- Taluchal
- Tovidarreh
- Vandarbon
