= Panjak, Trstenik =

Panjak
- Hamlet
- Location within Serbia
- Coordinates: 43°42′N 20°59′E
- Country: Serbia
- District: Rasina District
- Municipality: Trstenik municipality
- Time zone: UTC+1 (CET)
  - Summer (DST): UTC+2 (CEST)

Panjak (Serbian Cyrillic: Пањак) is a hamlet near the village of Rajinac in the Trstenik municipality of Serbia.
