= Kelardasht =

City in Mazandaran province, Iran

Kelardasht Persian: کلاردشت
- City
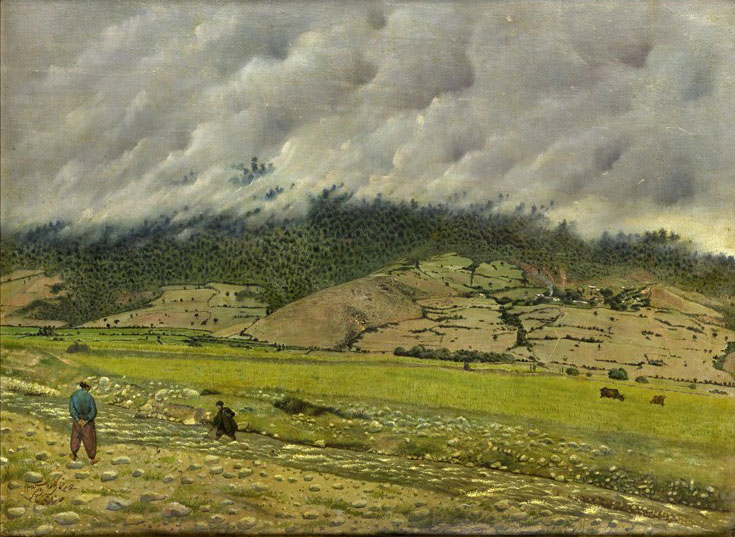
- Landscape near Kelardasht

- Location within Iran
- Coordinates: 36°30′20″N 51°09′32″E
- Country: Iran
- Province: Mazandaran
- County: Kelardasht
- District: Central

Population (2016)
  - Total: 13,401
- Time zone: UTC+3:30 (IRST)

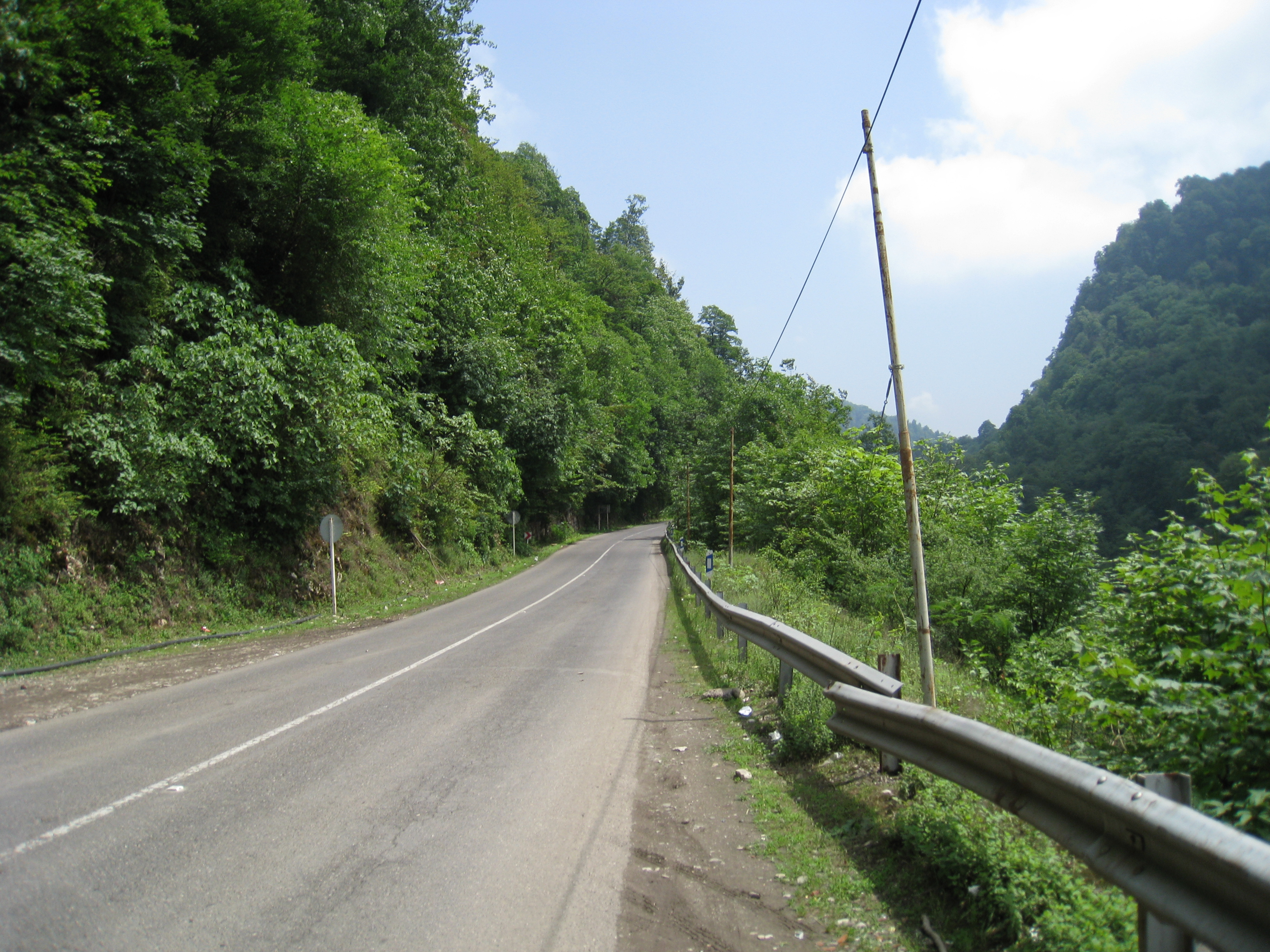
Road from Kelardasht to Abbasabad.

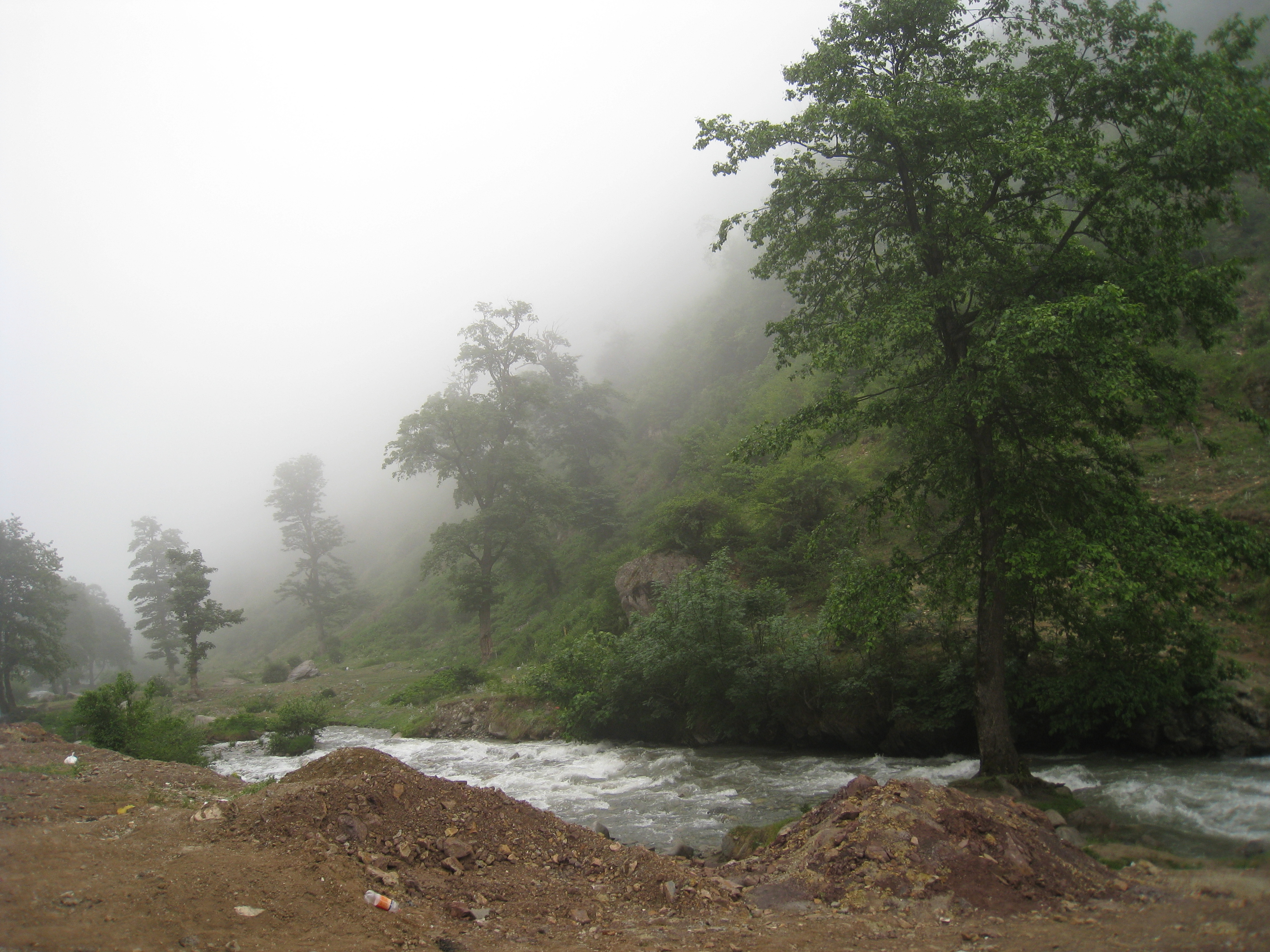
Outside Kelardasht.

Kelardasht (Persian: کلاردشت) (Note: Also romanized as Kalārdasht) is a city in the Central District of Kelardasht County, (Note: Formerly Kelardasht District of Chalus County) Mazandaran province, Iran, serving as capital of both the county and the district.

== Demographics ==
=== Language ===
The majority of the city's inhabitants speak Mazandarani. Some also speak Southern Kurdish and Laki.

=== Population ===
At the time of the 2006 National Census, the city's population was 11,921 in 3,361 households, when it was in Kelardasht District (Note: Renamed Kelardasht County) of Chalus County. The following census in 2011 counted 9,122 people in 2,809 households. The 2016 census measured the population of the city as 13,401 people in 4,565 households, by which time the district had been transformed into Kelardasht County, with Kelardasht as the new county's capital.

== Overview ==
The city comprises five districts: Hasankif, Lahu, Kordichal, Valbal, and Rudbarak. Hasankif has been the business district for many years and is currently also the political center.

Originally a farming area, in recent years much of its land was sold in small lots to build numerous villas that are occupied by summer visitors trying to escape the heat of Tehran and points further south.

Its attractions include Alamkuh Mountain (the second tallest peak in Iran at 4850m), Abbasabad Road, Valasht Lake, and a cooler climate. Picnicking and mountain climbing in the area surrounding Rudbarak, Mazandaran, Mazandaran, are also popular, as well as in the Abbasabad Forest nearby.

== See also ==
- Kelar Mound, Neolithic dwelling site in Kelardasht.
- Rudbarak, Mazandaran, Roudbarak is located North of Kelardasht.
- Mazichal, Mazichal Village in Kelardasht. Mazichal is the forest village which is located in the North of Iran in Kelardasht Province and is known for its Cloud Ocean & breathtaking scenes and views. Mazichal in local language means the Forest Pit full of Oak Trees. this area is a popular tourist destination, as it has many areas with unique geological, historic, and cultural features. Mazichal is located 2,600m above sea level

Media related to Kelardasht at Wikimedia Commons
