= Kalgah-e Olya =

Kalgah-e Olya كلگاه عليا
- Village
- Location within Iran
- Coordinates: 30°07′23″N 51°27′40″E
- Country: Iran
- Province: Fars
- County: Mamasani
- Bakhsh: Central
- Rural District: Bakesh-e Do

Population (2006)
  - Total: 434
- Time zone: UTC+3:30 (IRST)
  - Summer (DST): UTC+4:30 (IRDT)

Kalgah-e Olya (Persian: كلگاه عليا, also Romanized as Kalgāh-e 'Olyā; also known as Gol Gāh, Gol Kāh-e Bālā, Kalgāh, and Kalgāh-e Bālā) is a village in Bakesh-e Do Rural District, in the Central District of Mamasani County, Fars province, Iran. At the 2006 census, its population was 434, in 87 families.
