= Tavbor =

Tavbor تاوبر
- Village
- Location within Iran
- Coordinates: 33°01′56″N 49°05′16″E
- Country: Iran
- Province: Lorestan
- County: Aligudarz
- Bakhsh: Zaz and Mahru
- Rural District: Zaz-e Sharqi

Population (2006)
  - Total: 45
- Time zone: UTC+3:30 (IRST)
  - Summer (DST): UTC+4:30 (IRDT)

Tavbor (Persian: تاوبر, also Romanized as Tāvbor and Tāvar) is a village in Zaz-e Sharqi Rural District, Zaz and Mahru District, Aligudarz County, Lorestan Province, Iran. At the 2006 census, its population was 45, in 9 families.
