= Marzanabad =

City in Mazandaran province, Iran

Marzanabad Persian: مرزن آباد
- City
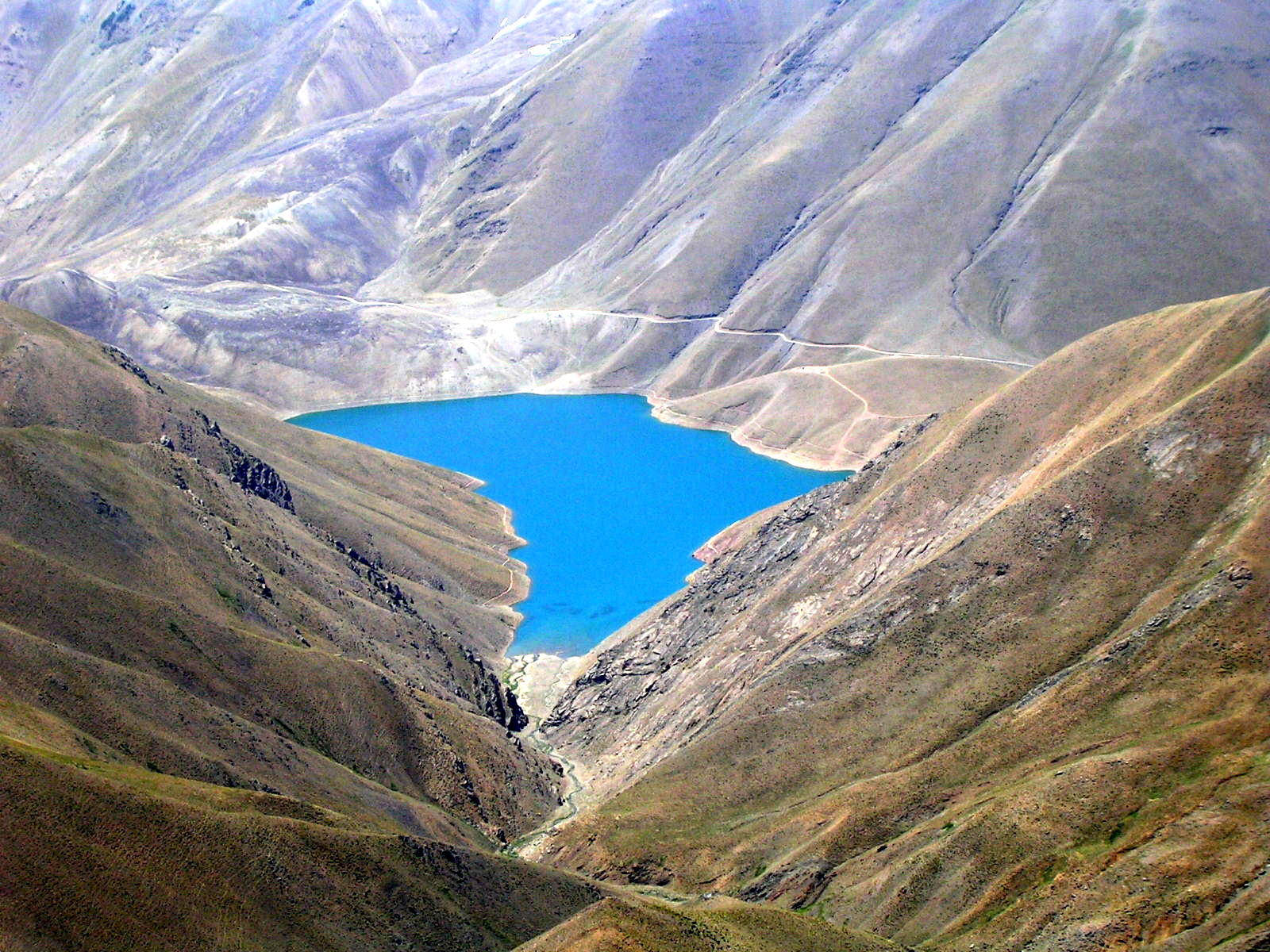
- Lake Valasht

- Location within Iran
- Coordinates: 36°27′14″N 51°18′02″E
- Country: Iran
- Province: Mazandaran
- County: Chalus
- District: Marzanabad

Population (2016)
  - Total: 6,698
- Time zone: UTC+3:30 (IRST)

Marzanabad (Persian: مرزن آباد) (Note: Also romanized as Marzanābād; also known as Marzūnābād and Murzānābād) is a city in, and the capital of, Marzanabad District in Chalus County, Mazandaran province, Iran.

== Geography ==
Marzanabad is at the foot of the Alborz Mountains and is surrounded by lush mountains and dense forests.

The city is on a T-junction of the roads towards Tehran, Chalus, and Kelardasht. It is about 29 km (18 mi) south of Chalus and 22 km (14 mi) southeast of Kelardasht, and about 119 km (74 mi) north of Tehran's city center, connected to Tehran and Chalus via the Chalus Road. Due to the location of the city, it attracts many tourists each year from all parts of Iran, but especially from Tehran.

Marzanabad is close to the site of the medieval town of Sa‘īdābād, which served as a garrison town during Abbasid times.

== Demographics ==
=== Population ===
At the time of the 2006 National Census, the city's population was 5,078 in 1,335 households, when it was in the former Kelardasht District. The following census in 2011 counted 5,789 people in 1,406 households, by which time the city had been separated from the district in the formation of Marzanabad District. The 2016 census measured the population of the city as 6,698 people in 1,841 households.
