= Kuhestan Rural District (Chalus County) =

Rural district in Mazandaran province, Iran

Kuhestan Rural District Persian: دهستان كوهستان
- Rural District
- Location within Iran
- Coordinates: 36°19′N 51°11′E
- Country: Iran
- Province: Mazandaran
- County: Chalus
- District: Marzanabad
- Established: 1987
- Capital: Tuvir

Population (2016)
  - Total: 6,942
- Time zone: UTC+3:30 (IRST)

Kuhestan Rural District (Persian: دهستان كوهستان) is in Marzanabad District of Chalus County, Mazandaran province, Iran. Its capital is the village of Tuvir.

== Demographics ==
=== Population ===
At the time of the 2006 National Census, the rural district's population (as a part of the former Kelardasht District) was 5,147 in 1,396 households. There were 5,516 inhabitants in 1,720 households at the following census of 2011, by which time the rural district had been separated from the district in the formation of Marzanabad District. The 2016 census measured the population of the rural district as 6,942 in 2,554 households. The most populous of its 66 villages was Dalir, with 568 people.

=== Other villages in the rural district ===
- Aliabad
- Anguran
- Ashir
- Bandar-e Olya
- Bandar-e Sofla
- Bijdeh-ye Now
- Chahar Bagh
- Chak Bozeh
- Chal Zamin
- Deh Shahr
- Dehnar
- Dezmakati
- Dozdband
- Elit
- Eshkarlet
- Feshkur
- Garm Rudbar
- Gijan
- Hali Hasht Sam
- Harijan
- Kal Posht
- Kandovan
- Karimabad
- Kelarak
- Kenes Darreh
- Khakak
- Khares
- Kotir
- Larak
- Laru Sar
- Likar
- Maka Rud
- Makar
- Margan
- Masal
- Matka-ye Rudbar
- Mecher
- Meres
- Mianak
- Michkar
- Mijlar
- Morad Chal
- Nater
- Nukres
- Panjak
- Pirajeh
- Pol-e Ushan
- Pol-e Zanguleh
- Pulad Kuh
- Pulad Kuh Sar
- Pustin Abad
- Razan
- Sar Cheshmeh
- Satereh
- Seyyed Kalam Sar
- Seyyed Khaneh Sar
- Siah Bisheh
- Taleh
- Valiabad
- Var Kola
- Vaspul
- Velasht
