= Dimu, Khuzestan =

Dimu ديمو
- Village
- Location within Iran
- Coordinates: 32°07′09″N 49°22′35″E
- Country: Iran
- Province: Khuzestan
- County: Andika
- Bakhsh: Abezhdan
- Rural District: Abezhdan

Population (2006)
  - Total: 129
- Time zone: UTC+3:30 (IRST)
  - Summer (DST): UTC+4:30 (IRDT)

Dimu (Persian: ديمو, also Romanized as Dīmū, Dīmaow, and Dīmow; also known as Deymāb) is a village in Abezhdan Rural District, Abezhdan District, Andika County, Khuzestan Province, Iran. At the 2006 census, its population was 129, in 23 families.
