= Khoshk Darreh, Afghanistan =

Khoshk Darreh
- Location in Afghanistan
- Coordinates: 34°50′N 67°36′E
- Country: Afghanistan
- Province: Bamyan Province
- Time zone: + 4.30

Khoshk Darreh is a village in Bamyan Province in central Afghanistan.

== See also ==
- Bamyan Province
