= Birun Bashm Rural District =

Rural district in Mazandaran province, Iran

Birun Bashm Rural District Persian: دهستان بيرون‌بشم
- Rural District
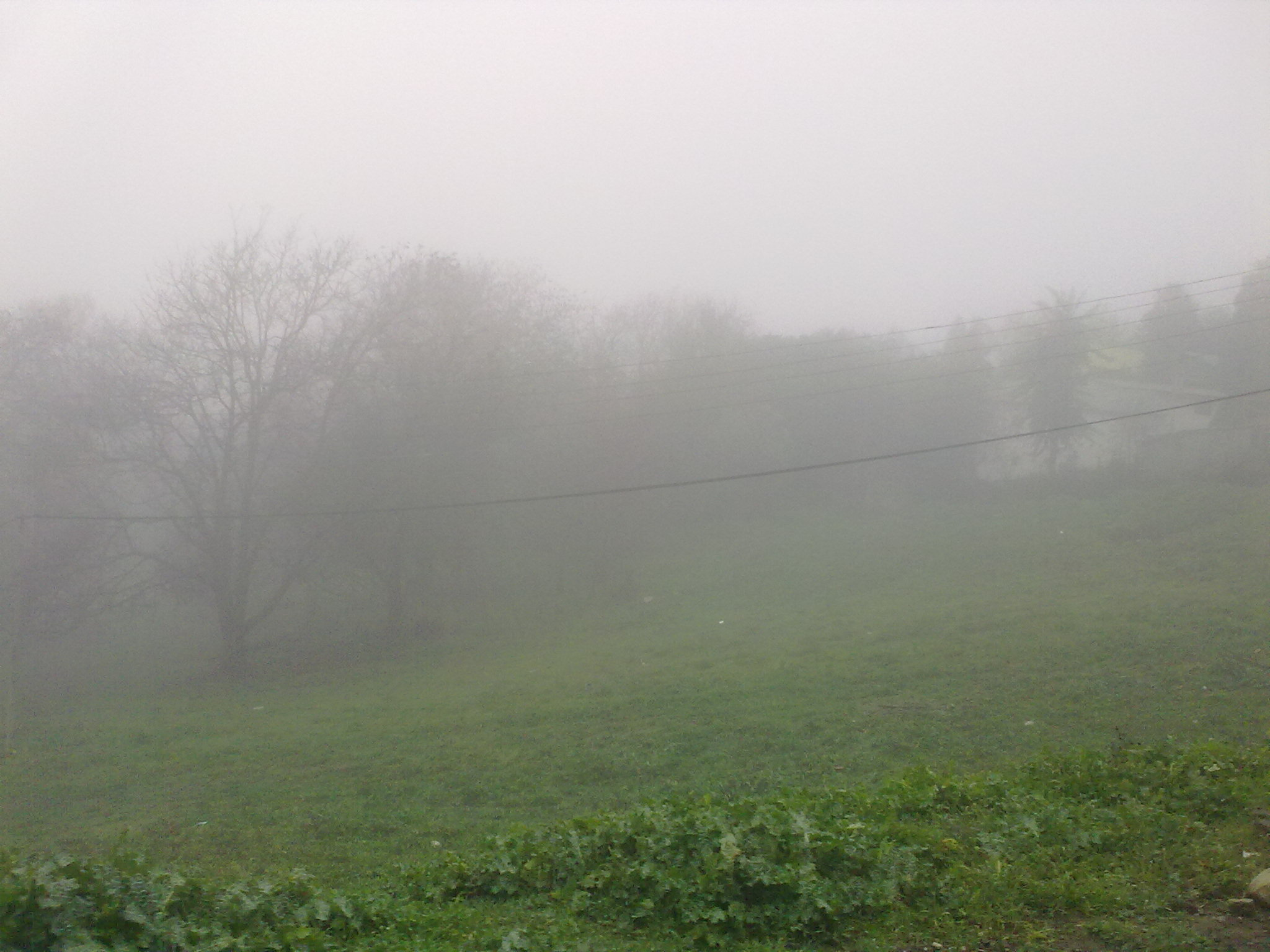
- Foggy landscape in Bashm Rural District

- Location within Iran
- Coordinates: 36°28′N 51°14′E
- Country: Iran
- Province: Mazandaran
- County: Chalus
- District: Marzanabad
- Established: 1987
- Capital: Guytar

Population (2016)
  - Total: 6,678
- Time zone: UTC+3:30 (IRST)

Birun Bashm Rural District (Persian: دهستان بيرون‌بشم) is in Marzanabad District of Chalus County, Mazandaran province, Iran. Its capital is the village Guytar. (Note: Formerly known as Guytar-e Sofla)

== Demographics ==
=== Population ===
At the time of the 2006 National Census, the rural district's population (as a part of the former Kelardasht District) was 5,852 in 1,602 households. There were 5,865 inhabitants in 1,923 households at the following census of 2011, by which time the rural district had been separated from the district in the formation of Marzanabad District. The 2016 census measured the population of the rural district as 6,678 in 2,348 households. The most populous of its 37 villages was Guytar, with 1,307 people.

=== Other villages in the rural district ===
- Aghuzdarbon
- Banafsheh Deh
- Golkah
- Kalenow-e Olya
- Pardangun
- Shahrestan
- Shahri
- Sirgah
