= Central District (Kelardasht County) =

District in Mazandaran province, Iran

Central District (Kelardasht County) Persian: بخش مرکزی شهرستان كلاردشت
- District
- Location within Iran
- Coordinates: 36°25′N 51°06′E
- Country: Iran
- Province: Mazandaran
- County: Kelardasht
- Capital: Kelardasht

Population (2016)
  - Total: 23,648
- Time zone: UTC+3:30 (IRST)

The Central District of Kelardasht County (Note: Formerly Kelardasht District of Chalus County) (Persian: بخش مرکزی شهرستان كلاردشت) is in Mazandaran province, Iran. Its capital is the city of Kelardasht.

== History ==
In 2009, Kelardasht-e Gharbi Rural District was created in Kelardasht District of Chalus County. Birun Bashm and Kuhestan Rural Districts, and the city of Marzanabad, were separated from the district in the formation of Marzanabad District.

In 2013, Kelardasht District was separated from the county and transformed into Kelardasht County, with Kelardasht as its capital and only city at the time.

== Demographics ==
=== Population ===
At the time of the 2016 National Census, the district's population was 23,648 in 8,067 households.

=== Administrative divisions ===
Central District (Kelardasht County) Population
| Administrative Divisions | 2016 |
|---|---|
| Kelardasht-e Gharbi RD | 6,501 |
| Kelardasht-e Sharqi RD (Note: Formerly Kelardasht Rural District) | 3,746 |
| Kelardasht (city) | 13,401 |
| Total | 23,648 |
RD = Rural District
