= Kelardasht-e Sharqi Rural District =

Rural district in Mazandaran province, Iran

Kelardasht-e Sharqi Rural District Persian: دهستان کلاردشت شرقی
- Rural District
- Location within Iran
- Coordinates: 36°32′N 51°14′E
- Country: Iran
- Province: Mazandaran
- County: Kelardasht
- District: Central
- Established: 1987
- Capital: Kordi Chal

Population (2016)
  - Total: 3,746
- Time zone: UTC+3:30 (IRST)

Kelardasht-e Sharqi Rural District (Persian: دهستان کلاردشت شرقی) (Note: English: Eastern Kelardasht Rural District) (Note: Formerly Kelardasht Rural District (دهستان کلاردشت)) is in the Central District of Kelardasht County, (Note: Formerly Kelardasht District of Chalus County) Mazandaran province, Iran. Its capital is the village of Kordi Chal.

== Demographics ==
=== Population ===
At the time of the 2006 National Census, the rural district's population (as a part of Kelardasht District (Note: Renamed Kelardasht County) in Chalus County) was 8,460 in 2,398 households. There were 3,083 inhabitants in 978 households at the following census of 2011, by which time the rural district had been renamed Kelardasht-e Sharqi Rural District. The 2016 census measured the population of the rural district as 3,746 in 1,282 households, when the district had been transformed into Kelardasht County. The most populous of its 18 villages was Kordi Chal, with 1,566 people.
