= Marzanabad District =

District in Mazandaran province, Iran

Marzanabad District Persian: بخش مرزن‌آباد
- District
- Location within Iran
- Coordinates: 36°22′N 51°11′E
- Country: Iran
- Province: Mazandaran
- County: Chalus
- Established: 2010
- Capital: Marzanabad

Population (2016)
  - Total: 20,318
- Time zone: UTC+3:30 (IRST)

Marzanabad District (Persian: بخش مرزن‌آباد) is in Chalus County, Mazandaran province, Iran. Its capital is the city of Marzanabad.

== History ==
In 2010, Birun Bashm and Kuhestan Rural Districts, and the city of Marzanabad, were separated from Kelardasht District in the formation of Marzanabad District.

== Demographics ==
=== Population ===
At the time of the 2011 National Census, the district's population was 17,170 people in 5,049 households. The 2016 census measured the population of the district as 20,318 inhabitants in 6,743 households.

=== Administrative divisions ===
Marzanabad District Population
Administrative Divisions	2011	2016
Birun Bashm RD	5,865	6,678
Kuhestan RD	5,516	6,942
Marzanabad (city)	5,789	6,698
Total	17,170	20,318
RD = Rural District
