= Kelardasht County =

County in Mazandaran province, Iran

Kelardasht County Persian: شهرستان کلاردشت
- County
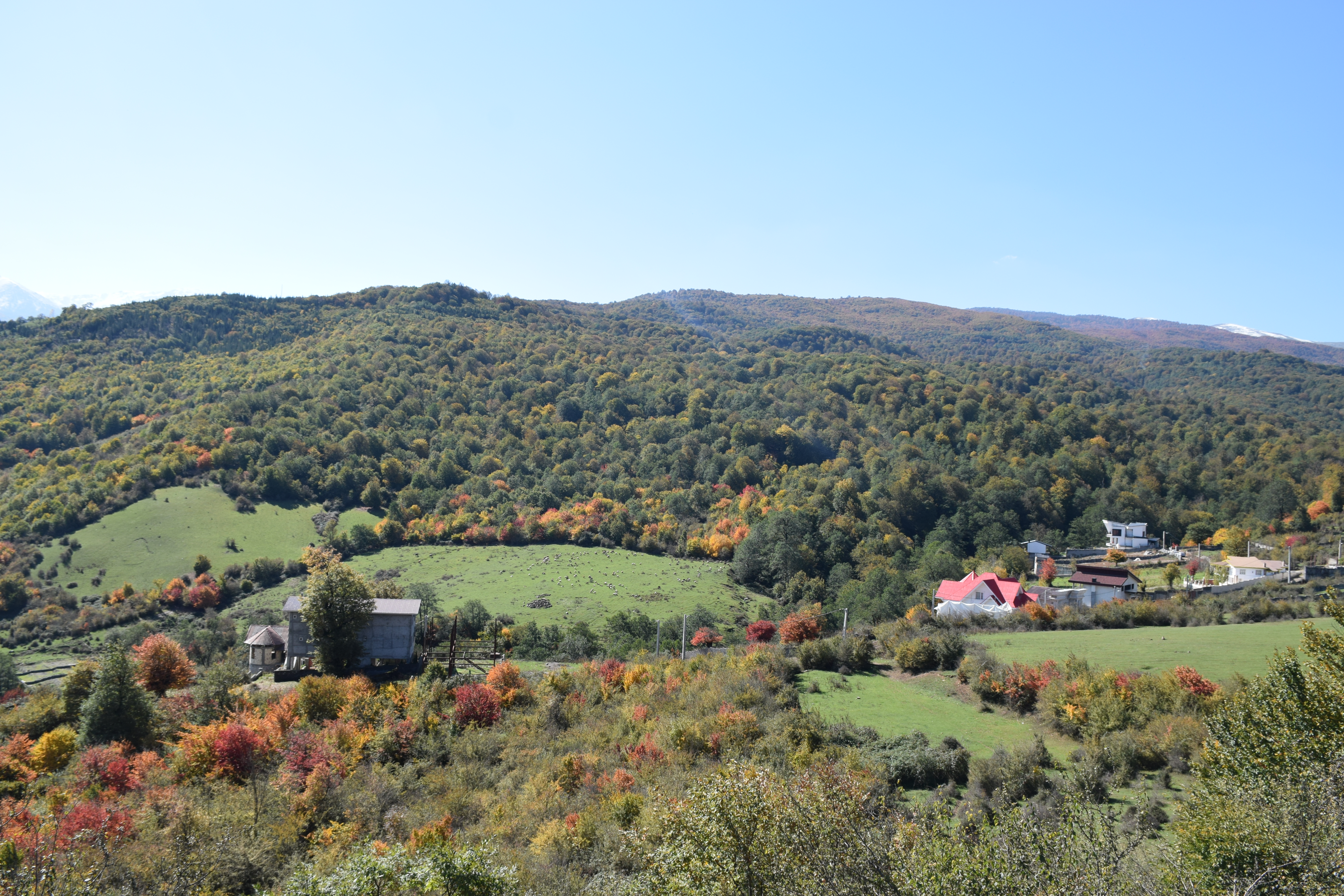

- Location of Kelardasht County in Mazandaran province (left, yellow)

- Location of Mazandaran province in Iran
- Coordinates: 36°25′N 51°06′E
- Country: Iran
- Province: Mazandaran
- Established: 2013
- Capital: Kelardasht
- Districts: Central

Population (2016)
  - Total: 23,648
- Time zone: UTC+3:30 (IRST)

Kelardasht County (Persian: شهرستان کلاردشت) (Note: Formerly Kelardasht District (بخش کلاردشت) of Chalus County) is in Mazandaran province, Iran. Its capital is the city of Kelardasht. Kelardasht corresponds to historical Kelarestaq.

The county is bordered by Chalus County on the east, Tonekabon County on the west, Abbasabad County on the north, and Alborz province on the south.

== History ==
In 2010, Kelardasht-e Gharbi Rural District was created in Kelardasht District of Chalus County. Birun Bashm and Kuhestan Rural Districts, and the city of Marzanabad, were separated from the district in the formation of Marzanabad District.

In 2013, Kelardasht District was separated from the county and transformed into Kelardasht County, with Kelardasht as its capital and only city at the time.

== Demographics ==
=== Population ===
At the time of the 2006 National Census, the population (as Kelardasht District of Chalus County) was 36,458 in 10,092 households. The following census in 2011 counted 17,350 people in 5,390 households. The 2016 census measured the population as 23,648 in 8,067 households, by which time the district had been transformed into Kelardasht County.

=== Administrative divisions ===
Kelardasht County's population and administrative structure are shown in the following table.

Kelardasht County Population (Note: As Kelardasht District of Chalus County at the 2006 and 2011 censuses)
Administrative Divisions	2006	2011	2016
Central District	36,458	17,350	23,648
Birun Bashm RD (Note: Transferred to Marzanabad District of Chalus County)	5,852		
Kelardasht-e Gharbi RD		5,145	6,501
Kelardasht-e Sharqi RD (Note: Formerly Kelardasht Rural District)	8,460	3,083	3,746
Kuhestan RD	5,147		
Kelardasht (city)	11,921	9,122	13,401
Marzanabad (city)	5,078		
Total	36,458	17,350	23,648
RD = Rural District

== See also ==
Media related to Kelardasht County at Wikimedia Commons
