= Chalus County =

County in Mazandaran province, Iran

Chalus County Persian: شهرستان چالوس
- County
- Location of Chalus County in Mazandaran province (center left, purple)

- Location of Mazandaran province in Iran
- Coordinates: 36°25′N 51°14′E
- Country: Iran
- Province: Mazandaran
- Established: 1996
- Capital: Chalus
- Districts: Central, Marzanabad

Area
  - Total: 1,597.30 km^{2} (616.72 sq mi)

Population (2016)
  - Total: 116,542
  - Density: 72.9619/km^{2} (188.970/sq mi)
- Time zone: UTC+3:30 (IRST)

Chalus County (Persian: شهرستان چالوس) is in Mazandaran province, Iran. Its capital is the city of Chalus.

== History ==
In 2010, Kelardasht-e Gharbi Rural District was created in Kelardasht District, and Birun Bashm and Kuhestan Rural Districts, and the city of Marzanabad were separated from it in the formation of Marzanabad District. In the same year, the village of Hachirud merged with other villages to become a city.

In 2013, Kelardasht District was separated from the county in the establishment of Kelardasht County.

Nowshahr, the eastern neighbor of Chalus, has a close historical relationship with Chalus.

== Demographics ==
=== Language ===
The people residing in Chalus speak Mazandarani. In western Chalus, the dialect of Kalarestaqi is spoken and in eastern Chalus, the dialect of Kojuri. During the Pahlavi dynasty, a group of Langrudi people migrated from western Gilan to Chalus. They speak Eastern Gilaki. The Eastern Gilaki language is spoken in the entire Chalus River Valley, though some Kurdish tribes were established in Kojur and Kelardasht in the Qajar period.

=== Population ===
At the time of the 2006 National Census, the county's population was 119,559 in 33,193 households. The following census in 2011 counted 122,736 people in 37,756 households. The 2016 census measured the population of the county as 116,542 in 39,105 households.

=== Administrative divisions ===
Chalus County's population history and administrative structure over three consecutive censuses are shown in the following table.

Chalus County Population
Administrative Divisions	2006	2011	2016
Central District	83,101	88,216	96,224
Kelarestaq-e Gharbi RD	13,953	13,798	4,854
Kelarestaq-e Sharqi RD	24,530	26,537	15,776
Chalus (city)	44,618	47,881	65,196
Hachirud (city)			10,398
Kelardasht District (Note: Transferred to Kelardasht County)	36,458	17,350	
Birun Bashm RD	5,852		
Kelardasht RD (Note: Renamed Kelardasht-e Sharqi Rural District)	8,460		
Kelardasht-e Gharbi RD		5,145	
Kelardasht-e Sharqi RD (Note: Formerly Kelardasht Rural District)		3,083	
Kuhestan RD	5,147		
Kelardasht (city)	11,921	9,122	
Marzanabad (city)	5,078		
Marzanabad District		17,170	20,318
Birun Bashm RD		5,865	6,678
Kuhestan RD		5,516	6,942
Marzanabad (city)		5,789	6,698
Total	119,559	122,736	116,542
RD = Rural District

== Climate ==
The warm, humid climate of Chalus was formerly considered unhealthy, and the bulk of the population of Chalus, as of all other towns in this region, used to migrate in summer to the summer pastures on the slopes around Delir and in the Kelardasht basin, one of the most popular and longest-settled districts in the region.

== See also ==
Media related to Chalus County at Wikimedia Commons
