= Goramjan =

Goramjan گرامجان
- Neighborhood
- Location within Iran
- Coordinates: 36°40′30″N 51°25′25″E
- Country: Iran
- Province: Mazandaran
- County: Chalus
- Bakhsh: Central
- City: Chalus

Population (2011)
  - Total: 1,680
- Time zone: UTC+3:30 (IRST)

Goramjan (Persian: گرامجان, also Romanized as Gorāmjān; also known as Gorāmjān va Salīmābād and Korāmjān) is a neighborhood in the city of Chalus in Mazandaran Province, Iran.

Formerly it was a village in Kelarestaq-e Sharqi Rural District, in the Central District of Chalus County. It's connected to Ayeshbon-e Sofla in northwest, Caspian Sea coast in north and northeast, Farajabad in east, Salimabad in southeast, Ayeshbon-e Olya in west and Chalus city's downtown in south.

At the 2006 census, its population was 1,549, in 432 families. The following census in 2011, reported 1,680 people in 527 households.
