= Pol-e Karat =

Pol-e Karat پل كرات
- Village
- Location within Iran
- Coordinates: 36°34′53″N 51°22′51″E
- Country: Iran
- Province: Mazandaran
- County: Chalus
- Bakhsh: Central
- Rural District: Kelarestaq-e Sharqi

Population (2016)
  - Total: 32
- Time zone: UTC+3:30 (IRST)

Pol-e Karat (Persian: پل كرات, also Romanized as Pol-e Karāt; also known as Pol-e Kalāt) is a village in Kelarestaq-e Sharqi Rural District, in the Central District of Chalus County, Mazandaran Province, Iran, located by Chalus River and Chalus Road. Pol-e Karat is connected to Akbarabad-e Pain and Marzanabad in south, and Mohammadabad and Chalus in north via Chalus Road.

At the 2016 census, its population was 32, in 12 families. Down from 44 people in 2006.
