= Owja Kolah =

Village in Mazandaran province, Iran

Owja Kolah Persian: اوجا كله
- Village
- Location within Iran
- Coordinates: 36°39′46″N 51°21′24″E
- Country: Iran
- Province: Mazandaran
- County: Chalus
- District: Central
- Rural District: Kelarestaq-e Gharbi
- Elevation: 20 m (66 ft)

Population (2016)
  - Total: 481
- Time zone: UTC+3:30 (IRST)

Owja Kolah (Persian: اوجا كله) (Note: Also romanized as Owjā Kolah; also known as Owjā Kolā and Ūjā Kolā) is a village in Kelarestaq-e Gharbi Rural District of the Central District in Chalus County, Mazandaran province, Iran.

== Demographics ==
=== Population ===
At the time of the 2006 National Census, the village's population was 382 in 113 households. The following census in 2011 counted 458 people in 151 households. The 2016 census measured the population of the village as 481 people in 169 households.

== Geography ==
Owja Kolah is between Sardab Rud River in its east and Hachirud River in its west. It has access to the city of Chalus and Chalus Road as well as Road 22 through rural roads. Settlements near Owja Kolah are Herteh Kola in the north, Nematabad and Karimabad in the east, and Chakhani in the west. South of Owja Kolah lie the Alborz mountains and forests.
