= Hoseynabad-e Olya, Mazandaran =

Village in Mazandaran province, Iran

Hoseynabad-e Olya Persian: حسين ابادعليا
- Village
- Location within Iran
- Coordinates: 36°39′06″N 51°24′07″E
- Country: Iran
- Province: Mazandaran
- County: Chalus
- District: Central
- Rural District: Kelarestaq-e Sharqi

Population (2016)
  - Total: 1,139
- Time zone: UTC+3:30 (IRST)

Hoseynabad-e Olya (Persian: حسين آباد عليا) (Note: Also romanized as Ḩoseynābād-e ‘Olyā) is a village in Kelarestaq-e Sharqi Rural District of the Central District in Chalus County, Mazandaran province, Iran.

== Demographics ==
=== Population ===
At the time of the 2006 National Census, the village's population was 880 in 223 households. The following census in 2011 counted 1,079 people in 317 households. The 2016 census measured the population of the village as 1,139 people in 363 households.

== Geography ==
Hoseynabad-e Olya is a southwestern suburb of the city of Chalus, with the city's bypass road passing through the northeast of the village. Nearby villages are Aliabad-e Chalus and Hoseynabad-e Sofla to its north, Tejen Kola-ye Olya to its west, Tejen Kola-ye Sofla to its northwest, and Mazuposhteh to its south.
