= Aliabad-e Chalus =

Village in Mazandaran province, Iran

Aliabad-e Chalus Persian: علي اباد چالوس
- Village
- Location within Iran
- Coordinates: 36°39′18″N 51°24′20″E
- Country: Iran
- Province: Mazandaran
- County: Chalus
- District: Central
- Rural District: Kelarestaq-e Sharqi

Population (2016)
  - Total: 944
- Time zone: UTC+3:30 (IRST)

Aliabad-e Chalus (Persian: علی‌آباد چالوس) (Note: Also romanized as ‘Alīābād-e Chālūs) is a village in Kelarestaq-e Sharqi Rural District of the Central District in Chalus County, Mazandaran province, Iran.

== Demographics ==
=== Population ===
At the time of the 2006 National Census, the village's population was 834 in 225 households. The following census in 2011 counted 934 people in 287 households. The 2016 census measured the population of the village as 944 people in 315 households.

== Geography ==
The village is a suburb of the city of Chalus, south of city limits and near the northern end of the Tehran-Shomal Freeway. Villages bordering Aliabad-e Chalus are Darkala-ye Olya to its southeast, Hoseynabad-e Sofla to its northwest, Mazuposhteh to its south, and Tejen Kola-ye Sofla to its west.
