= Salimabad, Chalus =

Salimabad سليم آباد
- Neighbourhood
- Location within Iran
- Coordinates: 36°40′23″N 51°25′34″E
- Country: Iran
- Province: Mazandaran
- County: Chalus
- Bakhsh: Central
- City: Chalus

Population (2011)
  - Total: 91
- Time zone: UTC+3:30 (IRST)

Salimabad (Persian: سليم آباد, also Romanized as Salīmābād) is a neighborhood in the city of Chalus in Mazandaran Province, Iran.

Formerly it was a village in Kelarestaq-e Sharqi Rural District, in the Central District of Chalus County. It's connected to Caspian Sea coast in north and northeast, Farajabad in east, Goramjan in northwest, Chalus River in southeast and Chalus city's downtown in south.

At the 2006 census, its population was 231, in 66 families. ِ Its population decreased to 91 people and 34 households in 2011.
