= Arb Kheyl =

Arb Kheyl ارب خيل
- village
- Location within Iran
- Coordinates: 36°39′38″N 51°22′45″E
- Country: Iran
- Province: Mazandaran
- County: Chalus
- Bakhsh: Central
- Rural District: Kelarestaq-e Sharqi

Population (2016)
  - Total: 590
- Time zone: UTC+03:30 (IRST)

Arb Kheyl (Persian: ارب خيل, also Romanized as ‘Arb Khīl and ‘Areb Kheyl) is a village in Kelarestaq-e Sharqi Rural District, in the Central District of Chalus County, Mazandaran Province, Iran. At the 2016 census, its population was 590, in 192 families. Up from 483 people in 2006.

Arb Kheyl is east of Sardab rud river, with Gil Kola and Najjar Kola villages to its north.
