= Eshkardasht =

Eshkardasht اشكاردشت
- Village
- Location within Iran
- Coordinates: 36°38′00″N 51°26′00″E
- Country: Iran
- Province: Mazandaran
- County: Chalus
- Bakhsh: Central
- City: Chalus

Population (2011)
  - Total: 1,561
- Time zone: UTC+3:30 (IRST)

Eshkardasht (Persian: اشكاردشت, also Romanized as Eshkārdasht) is suburb in the city of Chalus, in Mazandaran Province, Iran. It is just north of the Hyrcanian forests.

It was formerly a village in Kelarestaq-e Sharqi Rural District, in the Central District of Chalus County.

At the 2006 census, its population was 1,277, in 352 families. In 2011, its population was 1,561 people in 756 households, before being incorporated to Chalus city's urban area.

Illegal Deforestation in Eshkardasht, has caused landslides and flooding of water with abundant mud into the neighborhood.
