= Ayeshbon-e Olya =

Ayeshbon-e Olya ايشبن عليا
- Neighborhood
- Location within Iran
- Coordinates: 36°40′22″N 51°24′45″E
- Country: Iran
- Province: Mazandaran
- County: Chalus
- Bakhsh: Central
- City: Chalus

Population (2011)
  - Total: 1,118
- Time zone: UTC+3:30 (IRST)

Ayeshbon-e Olya (Persian: ايشبن عليا, also Romanized as Ayeshbon-e ‘Olyā) is a neighborhood in the city of Chalus in Mazandaran Province, Iran, located northwest of the city center.

Formerly it was a village in Kelarestaq-e Sharqi Rural District, in the Central District of Chalus County.

Nearby neighborhoods are Ayeshbon-e Sofla to its north, Goramjan to its east, Olvi Kola to its west and Bursar to its northwest.

== Demographics ==
At the 2006 census, its population was 1,180, in 324 households. In 2011 its population was 1,118 people in 553 households.
