= Bursar, Mazandaran =

Bursar بورسر
- Neighborhood
- Location within Iran
- Coordinates: 36°40′49″N 51°24′09″E
- Country: Iran
- Province: Mazandaran
- County: Chalus
- Bakhsh: Central
- City: Chalus

Population (2011)
  - Total: 293
- Time zone: UTC+3:30 (IRST)

Bursar (Persian: بورسر, also Romanized as Būrsar) is a neighborhood in the city of Chalus in Mazandaran Province, Iran, located northwest of the city center.

Formerly it was a village in Kelarestaq-e Sharqi Rural District, in the Central District of Chalus County.

Nearby neighborhoods are Ayeshbon-e Sofla to its northeast, Ayeshbon-e Olya to its southeast, and Sardab Rud river and village to its west.

== Demographics ==
At the 2006 census, its population was 243 people. In 2011 its population was 293 people in 155 households.
