= Shahrara, Mazandaran =

Shahrara شهرآرا
- Village
- Location within Iran
- Coordinates: 36°28′00″N 51°24′00″E
- Country: Iran
- Province: Mazandaran
- County: Chalus
- Bakhsh: Central
- Rural District: Kelarestaq-e Sharqi

Population (2016)
  - Total: 377
- Time zone: UTC+3:30 (IRST)

Shahrara (Persian: شهرآرا, also Romanized as Shahrārā) is a village in Kelarestaq-e Sharqi Rural District, in the Central District of Chalus County, Mazandaran Province, Iran. At the 2016 census, its population was 377, in 123 families. Up from 300 people in 2006.

Shahrara is a suburb south of Chalus city, with Darkala-ye Olya village to its north and Sinava village to its southwest.
