= Karimabad, Chalus =

Village in Mazandaran province, Iran

Karimabad Persian: كريم آباد
- Village
- Location within Iran
- Coordinates: 36°39′24″N 51°21′57″E
- Country: Iran
- Province: Mazandaran
- County: Chalus
- District: Central
- Rural District: Kelarestaq-e Gharbi

Population (2016)
  - Total: 319
- Time zone: UTC+3:30 (IRST)

Karimabad (Persian: كريم آباد) (Note: Also romanized as Karīmābād) is a village in Kelarestaq-e Gharbi Rural District of the Central District in Chalus County, Mazandaran province, Iran.

== Demographics ==
=== Population ===
At the time of the 2006 National Census, the village's population was 219 in 57 households. The following census in 2011 counted 252 people in 81 households. The 2016 census measured the population of the village as 319 people in 107 households.

== Geography ==
Karimabad is located west of the Sardab Rud River, with mountains and forests to its south. Nearby villages are Zavat-e Sharq in the southeast, Sibdeh in the north, and Owja Kolah in the northwest.
