= Sardab Rud =

Village in Mazandaran province, Iran

Sardab Rud Persian: سرداب‌رود
- Village
- Location within Iran
- Coordinates: 36°41′10″N 51°23′37″E
- Country: Iran
- Province: Mazandaran
- County: Chalus
- District: Central
- Rural District: Kelarestaq-e Gharbi

Population (2016)
  - Total: 685
- Time zone: UTC+3:30 (IRST)

Sardab Rud (Persian: سرداب‌رود) (Note: Also romanized as Sard Aberud, Sardāb Rūd, and Sardabrūd) is a village in Kelarestaq-e Gharbi Rural District of the Central District in Chalus County, Mazandaran province, Iran.

== Geography ==
Sardab Rud is located west of the city of Chalus and east of the city of Hachirud. Sardab Rud's name is the same as the river that passes between the village and Chalus. The river originates from the Alborz mountains and passes through Rudbarak and Kelardasht. Nearby villages include Mian Deh in southwest and Shahrak-e Shahid Rejai in west.

== Demographics ==
=== Population ===
At the time of the 2006 National Census, the village's population was 549 in 164 households. The following census in 2011 counted 788 people in 272 households. The 2016 census measured the population of the village as 685 people in 246 households. It was the most populous village in its rural district.

== See also ==
- Sardab River
