= Akbarabad-e Bala =

Akbarabad-e Bala اكبرآباد بالا
- Village
- Interactive map of Akbarabad-e Bala
- Coordinates: 36°33′14.4″N 51°22′15.6″E
- Country: Iran
- Province: Mazandaran
- County: Chalus
- Bakhsh: Central
- Rural District: Kelarestaq-e Sharqi

Population (2016)
  - Total: 11
- Time zone: UTC+3:30 (IRST)

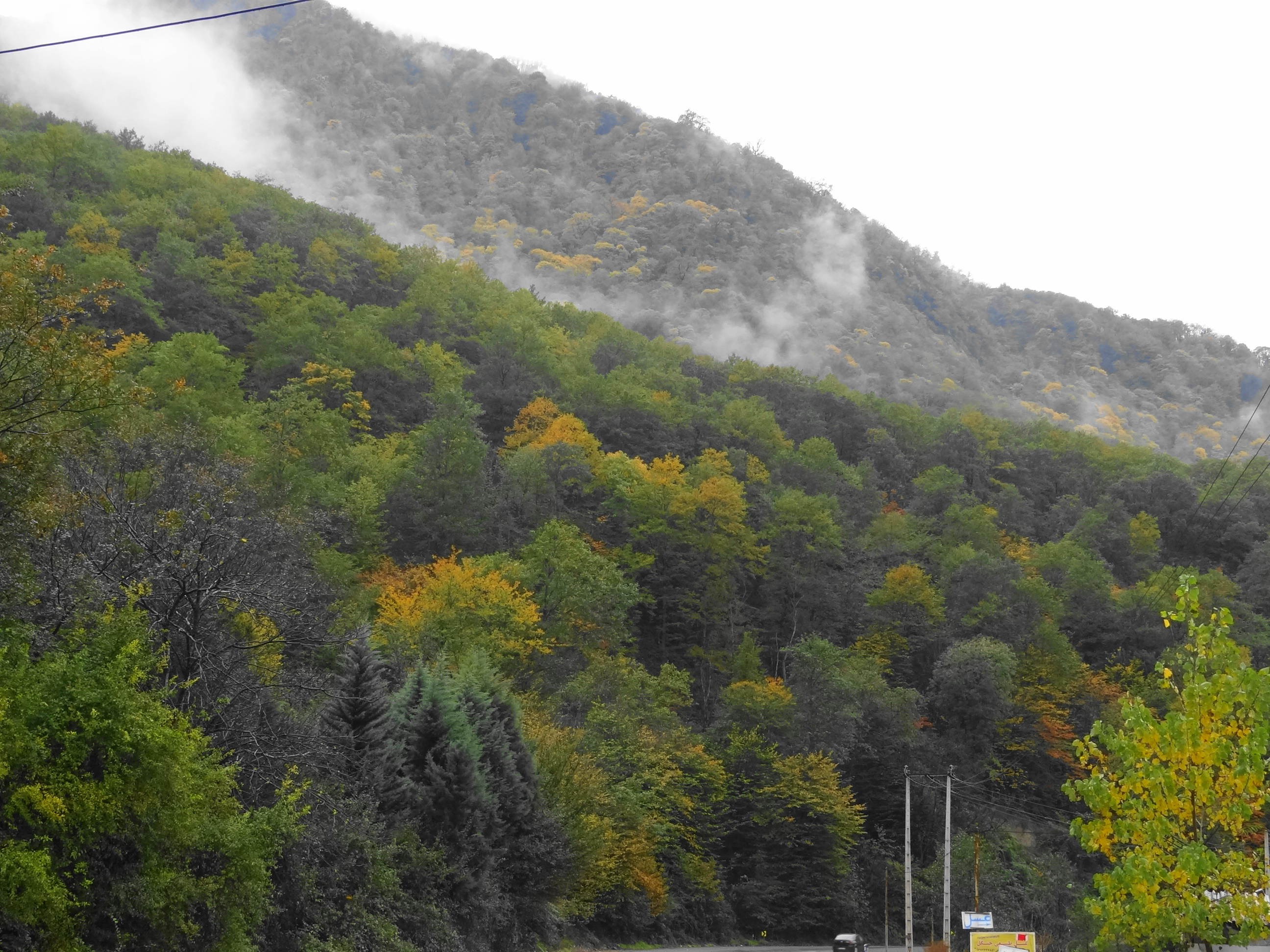

Akbarabad-e Bala (Persian: اكبرآباد بالا, also Romanized as Akbarābād-e Bālā) is a village in Kelarestaq-e Sharqi Rural District, in the Central District of Chalus County, Mazandaran Province, Iran. At the 2016 census, its population was 11, in 4 families. Decreased from 25 people in 2006. It is located by Chalus Road and near Chalus river, south of Akbarabad-e Pain village.
