= Ayeshbon =

Ayeshbon (Persian: ايشبن) may refer to:

- Ayeshbon-e Olya
- Ayeshbon-e Sofla
