= Tejen Kola-ye Sofla =

Tejen Kola-ye Sofla تجنكلا سفلی
- Village
- Location within Iran
- Coordinates: 36°39′44″N 51°23′36″E
- Country: Iran
- Province: Mazandaran
- County: Chalus
- Bakhsh: Central
- Rural District: Kelarestaq-e Sharqi

Population (2016)
  - Total: 613
- Time zone: UTC+3:30 (IRST)

Tejen Kola-ye Sofla (Persian: تجنكلا سفلی, also Romanized as Tejen Kolā-ye Soflá; also known as Tejen Kolā) is a village in Kelarestaq-e Sharqi Rural District, in the Central District of Chalus County, Mazandaran Province, Iran. At the 2016 census, its population was 613, in 187 families. Increased from 457 people in 2006.

The village is a western suburb of Chalus city, located west of the city's bypass road. Nearby villages are Hoseynabad-e Olya to its south, Hoseynabad-e Sofla to its east, Tejen Kola-ye Olya to its wouth west, and Tazehabad to its north.
