= Akbarabad-e Chalus =

Akbarabad-e Chalus اكبرآباد چالوس
- Village
- Interactive map of Akbarabad-e Chalus
- Coordinates: 36°40′37.2″N 51°23′38.4″E
- Country: Iran
- Province: Mazandaran
- County: Chalus
- Bakhsh: Central
- Rural District: Kelarestaq-e Sharqi

Population (2016)
  - Total: 217
- Time zone: UTC+3:30 (IRST)

Akbarabad-e Chalus (Persian: اكبرآباد چالوس, also Romanized as Akbarābād-e Chālūs) is a village in Kelarestaq-e Sharqi Rural District, in the Central District of Chalus County, Mazandaran Province, Iran. It is a suburb of Chalus city, located west of the city's bypass road, and east of Sardab Rud river.

At the 2016 census, its population was 217, in 71 families.
