= Tejen Kola-ye Olya =

Village in Mazandaran province, Iran

Tejen Kola-ye Olya Persian: تجنكلاعليا
- Village
- Location within Iran
- Coordinates: 36°39′08″N 51°23′00″E
- Country: Iran
- Province: Mazandaran
- County: Chalus
- District: Central
- Rural District: Kelarestaq-e Sharqi

Population (2016)
  - Total: 1,057
- Time zone: UTC+3:30 (IRST)

Tejen Kola-ye Olya (Persian: تجنكلاعليا) (Note: Also romanized as Tejen Kolā-ye ‘Olyā; also known as Tejen Kolā-ye Bālā) is a village in Kelarestaq-e Sharqi Rural District of the Central District in Chalus County, Mazandaran province, Iran.

== Demographics ==
=== Population ===
At the time of the 2006 National Census, the village's population was 1,102 in 280 households. The following census in 2011 counted 1,333 people in 382 households. The 2016 census measured the population of the village as 1,057 people in 335 households.

== Geography ==
Nearby villages are Hoseynabad-e Olya and Mazuposhteh to its east, Tejen Kola-ye Sofla to its northeast, and Zavat-e Sharq to its west.
