= Zavat =

Zavat (Persian: زوات) may refer to:

- Zavat-e Gharb
- Zavat-e Sharq
