= Tejen Kola =

Tejen Kola (Persian: تجنكلا) may refer to:

- Tejen Kola-ye Olya
- Tejen Kola-ye Sofla
