= Dizin Pass =

Mountain pass in Iran

- Interactive map of Dizin Pass
- Elevation: 3,272 m (10,735 ft)
- Traversed by: Shemshak - Dizin Road

Third Approach
- Location: Shemiranat County– Tehran Province, Iran
- Range: Alborz
- Coordinates: 36°02′15″N 51°26′00″E

Dizin Pass (Persian: گردنه دیزین) is a mountain pass in Alborz Mountain Range, Iran. The road leading to Dizin Pass connnects the mountainous city of Shemshak and Dizin ski resort. It is one of the natural passages of Tehran and Alborz provinces. On an elevation of 3,272 meters, it is one the highest paved mountain passes in West Asia.

Since Summer of 2017, due to low traffic security, the road to Dizin Pass has been closed to vehicles. Closest vehicular access to Dizin Pass is from Darband Sar village; from there, the remaining stretch of the road is only accessible on foot or saddle. Other end (west) of Dizin Pass is an alpine road with numerous switchbacks which is being renovated but its accessible to non-vehicular traffic.

Since the 1960s, a gondola lift connects the foot of the pass to its peak.

== See also ==
- Tehran-Shomal Freeway
- Lavasan
- Kandovan Tunnel
