= Olvi Kola =

Olvi Kola علوی كلا
- Neighbourhood
- Location within Iran
- Coordinates: 36°40′16″N 51°24′02″E
- Country: Iran
- Province: Mazandaran
- County: Chalus
- Bakhsh: Central
- City: Chalus

Population (2011)
  - Total: 4,051
- Time zone: UTC+3:30 (IRST)

Olvi Kola (Persian: علوی كلا, also Romanized as ‘Olvī Kolā; also known as Ayvī Kolā) is a neighborhood in the western part of Chalus city in Mazandaran Province, Iran.

It was formerly a village in Kelarestaq-e Sharqi Rural District, in the Central District of Chalus County.

At the time of the 2006 National Census, its population was 4,142 in 1,089 households. The following census in 2011 counted 4,051 people in 1,212 households.
