= Namarestagh =

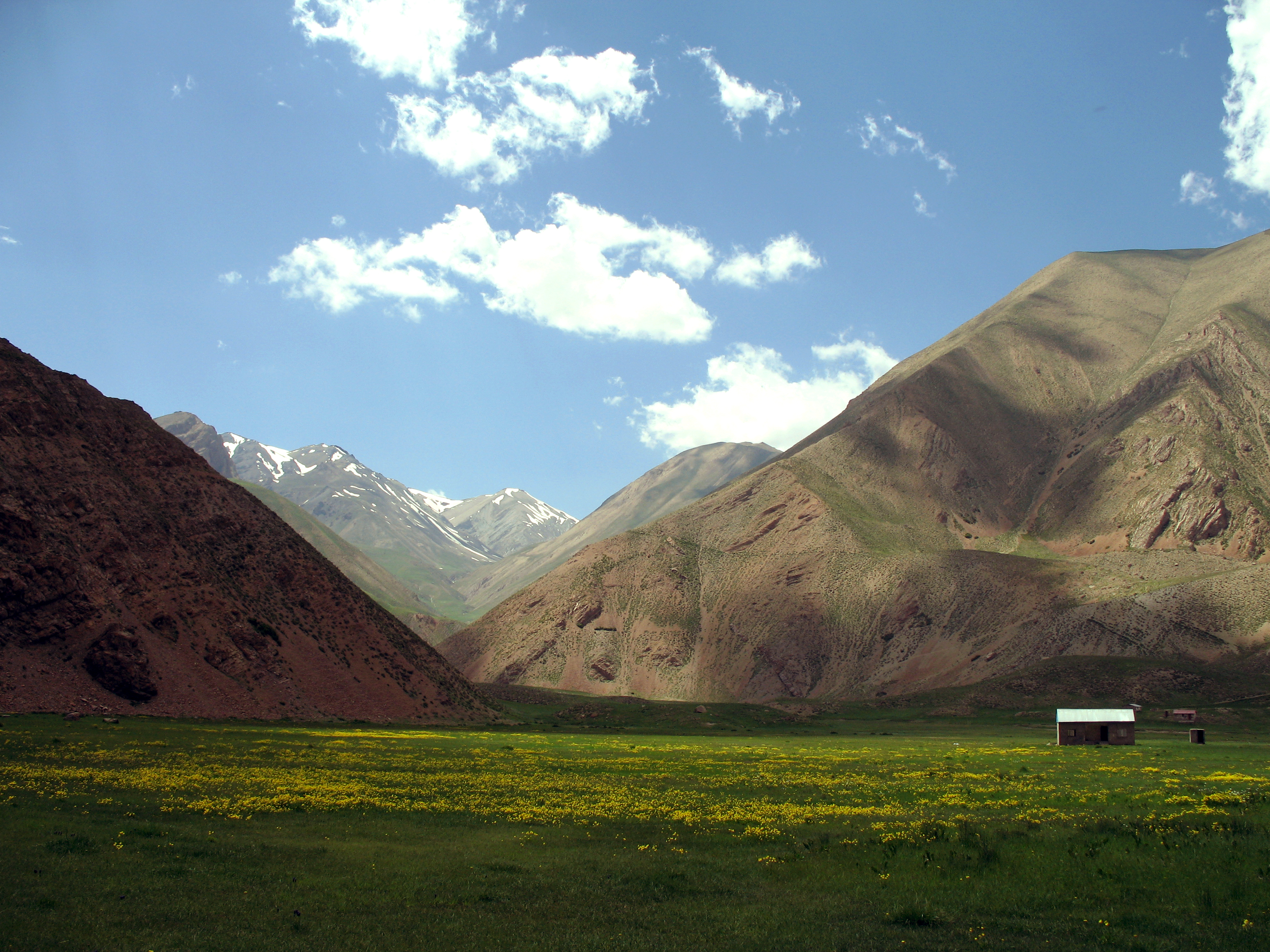
Namarestaq nature.

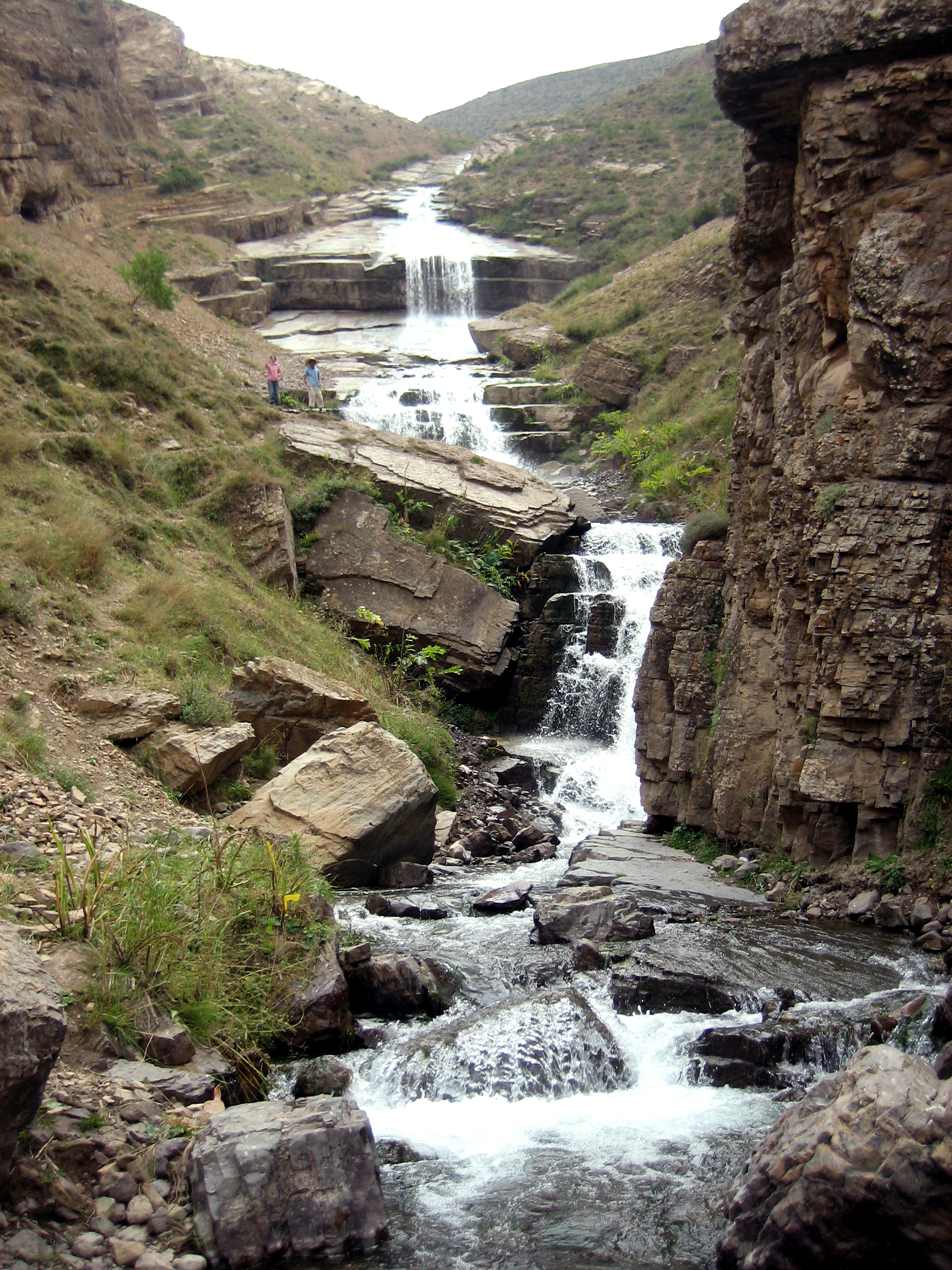
Koohareh waterfall in Namarestaq

Namarestaq is a Rural District in Mazandaran Province of Iran. It is situated in Amol County.

== See also ==
- Kelarestaq
- Kolijanrestaq
