= Talaju =

Talaju طلاجو
- Village
- Location within Iran
- Coordinates: 36°37′19″N 51°22′59″E
- Country: Iran
- Province: Mazandaran
- County: Chalus
- Bakhsh: Central
- Rural District: Kelarestaq-e Sharqi

Population (2016)
  - Total: 603
- Time zone: UTC+3:30 (IRST)

Talaju (Persian: طلاجو, also Romanized as Ţalājū) is a village in Kelarestaq-e Sharqi Rural District, in the Central District of Chalus County, Mazandaran Province, Iran.

At the time of the 2006 National Census, the village's population was 620 in 146 households. The following census in 2011 counted 646 people in 192 households. The 2016 census measured the population of the village as 603 people in 195 households.
