= Chenes =

Chenes چنس
- Village
- Location within Iran
- Coordinates: 36°32′33″N 51°19′56″E
- Country: Iran
- Province: Mazandaran
- County: Chalus
- Bakhsh: Central
- Rural District: Kelarestaq-e Sharqi

Population (2016)
  - Total: 51
- Time zone: UTC+3:30 (IRST)

Chenes (Persian: چنس) is a village in Kelarestaq-e Sharqi Rural District, in the Central District of Chalus County, Mazandaran Province, Iran. At the 2016 census, its population was 51, in 20 families. Decreased from 167 people in 2006.
