= Pichdeh =

Pichdeh (Persian: پيچده) may refer to:

- Pichdeh, Chalus
- Pichdeh, Nur
