= Kelachan =

Village in Mazandaran province, Iran

Kelachan Persian: كلاچان
- Village
- Location within Iran
- Coordinates: 36°40′12″N 51°21′46″E
- Country: Iran
- Province: Mazandaran
- County: Chalus
- District: Central
- Rural District: Kelarestaq-e Gharbi

Population (2016)
  - Total: 476
- Time zone: UTC+3:30 (IRST)

Kelachan (Persian: كلاچان) (Note: Also romanized as Kelāchān; also known as Kolā Jān) is a village in Kelarestaq-e Gharbi Rural District of the Central District in Chalus County, Mazandaran province, Iran.

== Demographics ==
=== Population ===
At the time of the 2006 National Census, the village's population was 370 in 104 households. The following census in 2011 counted 440 people in 137 households. The 2016 census measured the population of the village as 476 people in 167 households.
