= Ayeshbon-e Sofla =

Ayeshbon-e Sofla ايشبن سفلی
- Neighborhood
- Location within Iran
- Coordinates: 36°40′40″N 51°24′25″E
- Country: Iran
- Province: Mazandaran
- County: Chalus
- Bakhsh: Central
- City: Chalus

Population (2011)
  - Total: 275
- Time zone: UTC+3:30 (IRST)

Ayeshbon-e Sofla (Persian: ايشبن سفلی, also Romanized as Ayeshbon-e Soflá) is a neighborhood in the city of Chalus in Mazandaran Province, Iran. , located north of the city center and near the Caspian Sea coast. Nearby neighborhoods are Ayeshbon-e Olya to its south, and Bursar to its southwest.

Formerly, it was a village in Kelarestaq-e Sharqi Rural District, in the Central District of Chalus County.

== Demographics ==
At the 2006 census, the village had a population of 439, in 128 households. In 2011 census, its population was 275 people in 138 households.
