= Kahar (mountain) =

Mountain in the central Alborz, Iran

- Location within Iran

Highest point
- Elevation: 4,015 m (13,173 ft)
- Prominence: 286 m (938 ft)
- Coordinates: 36.1170°N 51.0846°E

Naming
- Native name: کهار (Persian)

Geography
- Location: Alborz Province, Iran
- Parent range: Kahar massif, central Alborz

Kahar (Persian: کهار; also Kuh-e Kohar) is a mountain in the Kahar massif of the central Alborz, in Alborz Province, Iran, north of the Karaj river reservoir near Asara. Its main summit, sometimes called Kahar the Great (کهار بزرگ), rises to about 4,015 metres (13,173 ft), with a topographic prominence of about 286 metres (938 ft); Persian sources also give a figure of about 4,050 metres (13,290 ft).

== Geography ==
Kahar is a cluster of summits, the highest being Kahar the Great, with a lower top called Kahar the Small (کهار کوچک) to the west; its parent peak is the adjacent Kuh-e Naz (4,108 metres (13,478 ft)), from which a 3,790 metres (12,430 ft) saddle separates it. The mountain forms a natural divide between the Chalus-road valley and the Taleqan and Savojbolagh districts, and lies within the Central Alborz Protected Area.

== Climbing ==
The standard route climbs from the village of Kalvan (Kolvan), reached off the Karaj–Chalus road, up the south-eastern ridge, passing a mountain shelter at about 3,200 metres (10,500 ft). The round trip is roughly 16 kilometres (9.9 mi); the ascent is non-technical in summer but a serious winter objective. A traverse linking Kahar with neighbouring Kuh-e Naz is a popular outing.

== See also ==
- List of Iranian four-thousanders
