= Kelarestaq =

Kelarestaq (Persian: كلارستاق) may refer to:

- Kelarestaq-e Gharbi Rural District
- Kelarestaq-e Sharqi Rural District
