= Kuh-e Naz =

Mountain in the central Alborz, Iran

- Location within Iran

Highest point
- Elevation: 4,108 m (13,478 ft)
- Prominence: 974 m (3,196 ft)
- Coordinates: 36.1084°N 51.0410°E

Naming
- Native name: کوه ناز (Persian)

Geography
- Location: Alborz Province, Iran
- Parent range: Kahar massif, central Alborz

Kuh-e Naz (Persian: کوه ناز, also romanized Naz) is a mountain in the Kahar massif of the central Alborz, in Alborz Province, Iran. One of the Iranian four-thousanders, it rises to 4,108 metres (13,478 ft) and has a topographic prominence of about 974 metres (3,196 ft), making it one of the more prominent summits of the range.

== Geography ==
Naz is bounded on the south by the Chalus-road valley and the Karaj River and on the north by the Taleqan district, and its ridge connects to neighbouring summits including Kahar. It lies within the Central Alborz Protected Area.

== Climbing ==
The main route ascends the southern Siader ridge from the village of Kalvan, off the Karaj–Chalus road, passing a shelter at about 3,200 metres (10,500 ft); the round trip is roughly 21 kilometres (13 mi) and the climb, though non-technical, is long and a serious undertaking in winter. A ridge traverse linking Naz with the neighbouring Kahar is a popular outing.

== See also ==
- List of Iranian four-thousanders
