= Sinava Cheshmeh =

Sinava Cheshmeh سينواچشمه
- Village
- Location within Iran
- Coordinates: 36°37′03″N 51°23′08″E
- Country: Iran
- Province: Mazandaran
- County: Chalus
- Bakhsh: Central
- Rural District: Kelarestaq-e Sharqi

Population (2016)
  - Total: 432
- Time zone: UTC+3:30 (IRST)

Sinava Cheshmeh (Persian: سينواچشمه, also Romanized as Sīnavā Cheshmeh; also known as Lāt) is a village in Kelarestaq-e Sharqi Rural District, in the Central District of Chalus County, Mazandaran Province, Iran.

At the time of the 2006 National Census, the village's population was 562 in 131 households. The following census in 2011 counted 453 people in 132 households. The 2016 census measured the population of the village as 432 people in 143 households.
