= Mazuposhteh =

Village in Mazandaran province, Iran

Mazuposhteh Persian: مازوپشته
- Village
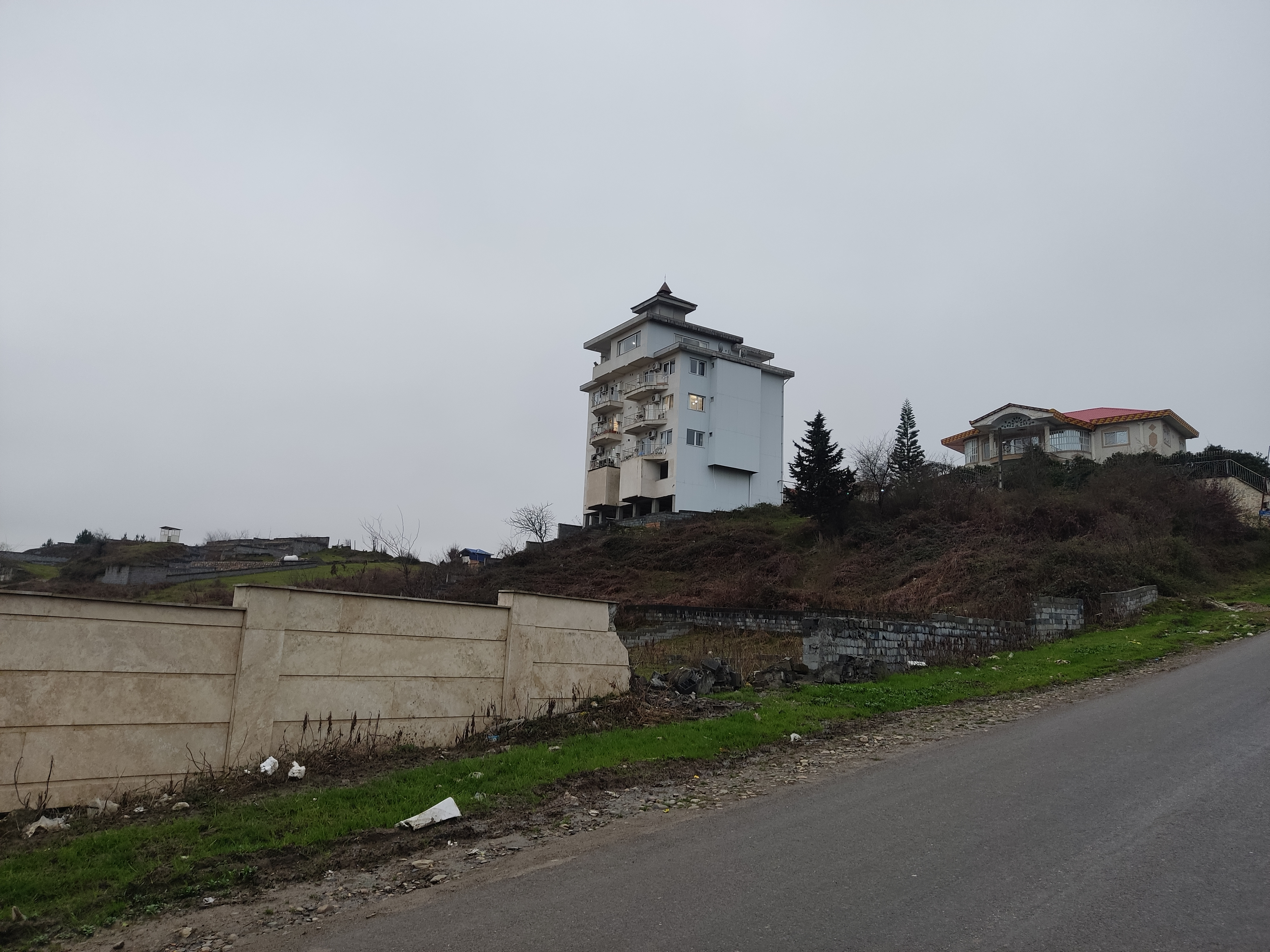
- The village of Mazuposhteh

- Location within Iran
- Coordinates: 36°38′54″N 51°24′02″E
- Country: Iran
- Province: Mazandaran
- County: Chalus
- District: Central
- Rural District: Kelarestaq-e Sharqi

Population (2016)
  - Total: 1,125
- Time zone: UTC+3:30 (IRST)

Mazuposhteh (Persian: مازوپشته) (Note: Also romanized as Māzūposhteh) is a village in Kelarestaq-e Sharqi Rural District of the Central District in Chalus County, Mazandaran province, Iran.

== Demographics ==
=== Population ===
At the time of the 2006 National Census, the village's population was 993 in 256 households. The following census in 2011 counted 1,242 people in 359 households. The 2016 census measured the population of the village as 1,125 people in 371 households.

== Geography ==
Mazuposhteh is a southwestern suburb of the city of Chalus, on the northern slopes of the Alborz Mountains, bordering the Hyrcanian forests to its south and southwest, Darkala-ye Olya to its east, Hoseynabad-e Olya to its north, and Aliabad-e Chalus to its northeast.
