= Sar Cheshmeh, Chalus =

Sar Cheshmeh سرچشمه
- Village
- Location within Iran
- Coordinates: 36°36′00″N 51°23′00″E
- Country: Iran
- Province: Mazandaran
- County: Chalus
- Bakhsh: Central
- Rural District: Kelarestaq-e Sharqi

Population (2016)
  - Total: 44
- Time zone: UTC+3:30 (IRST)

Sar Cheshmeh (Persian: سرچشمه) is a village in Kelarestaq-e Sharqi Rural District, in the Central District of Chalus County, Mazandaran Province, Iran.

At the time of the 2006 National Census, the village's population was 59 in 17 households. The following census in 2011 counted 52 people in 17 households. The 2016 census measured the population of the village as 44 people in 13 households.
