= Shahrak-e Mostafa Khomeyni, Mazandaran =

Shahrak-e Mostafa Khomeyni شهرک مصطفی خمینی
- Township
- Country: Iran
- Province: Mazandaran
- County: Chalus
- Bakhsh: Central
- City: Chalus

Population (2011)
  - Total: 1,227
- Time zone: UTC+3:30 (IRST)

Shahrak-e Mostafa Khomeyni (Persian: شهرک مصطفی خمینی, also Romanized as Shahrak-e Moṣṭafá Khomeynī) is a residential township in the city of Chalus in Mazandaran Province, Iran.

At the 2006 census, its population was 1,224, in 347 families. The 2011 census reported a population of 1,227 people in 393 households.
