= Bursar, Iran =

Bursar (Persian: بورسر) in Iran may refer to:

- Bursar, Mazandaran
- Bursar, Sistan and Baluchestan
