= Kandovan Tunnel =

1938 road tunnel in Iran

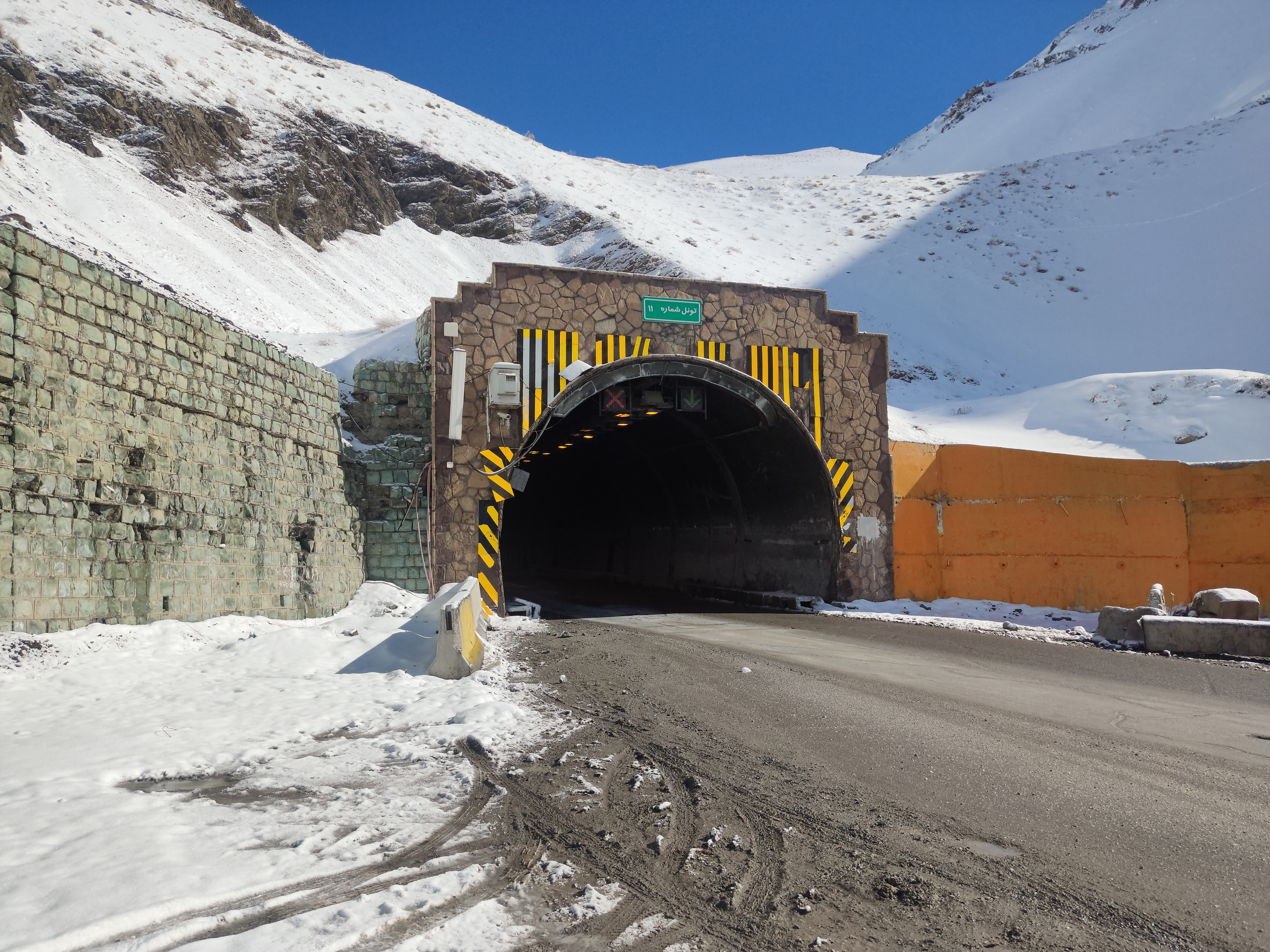
- Kandovan Tunnel In 2024; the green sign reads "11th Tunnel" (تونل شماره ۱۱)
- Interactive map of Kandovan Tunnel

Overview
- Other name: 11th Tunnel of Chalus Road
- Coordinates: 36°09′13.8″N 51°18′44.0″E
- Crosses: Kandovan Pass: 3,030 m (9,940 ft)

Operation
- Work began: 1935
- Opened: 17 May 1938
- Closed: 1995
- Reopened: 2002

Technical
- Length: 1,883 m (6,178 ft)
- No. of lanes: Two
- Operating speed: 50 km/h
- Max elevation: 2,700 m (8,900 ft)
- Tunnel clearance: 6 m (20 ft)
- Width: 5.5 m (18 ft)

The Kandovan Tunnel (Persian: تونل کندوان), officially 11th Tunnel (Persian: تونل شماره ۱۱), is a major road tunnel on Chalus Road, Iran. The 1,883-metre (6,178 ft) tunnel crosses Alborz, connecting Alborz province to Mazandaran province. It was completed in 1938 as one of the first tunnels in Iran in order to make the route from Tehran to Caspian Sea passable in harsh winter times.

== History ==
Before the construction of the Kandovan Tunnel, travelling from Tehran to Mazandaran in this section of the Alborz Range was usually impossible in wintertime and early spring. In 1864, by the commission of Naser al-Din Shah Qajar, Austrian engineer Albert Joseph Gasteiger built a paved road (for horseback riding, the method of travelling at the time) from Marzanabad to Gach Sar, but the Kandovan Pass, the highest point of that road, remained difficult for travel.

After the invention of automobiles, the demand for a road suitable for vehicles with rubber tires (instead of horse-drawn carriages and the like) grew. In 1935, by the commission of Reza Shah, the existing road was ordered to be widened and repaved, and a new tunnel that could cross the Kandovan Pass was built. On 17 May 1938, the new tunnel was officially opened in the presence of the Pahlavi king and his young crown prince. The tunnel formed part of the Tehran-Caspian highway linking Tehran to Alborz. The construction cost was 24,853,400 Rials (US$1,461,964 then; $33.4 million in 2025).

== Renovation ==
The Kandovan Tunnel was not built to be sufficiently wide and high for the safe passage of two automobiles or tall trucks traveling at high speed. Two police officers had to stand at either end of the tunnel, guiding drivers by letting them inside in groups, and stopping traffic from the opposite side. After half a century the population of Iran had doubled and transit through the Kandovan Tunnel became a major challenge.

In 1995, by the commission of the government of Akbar Hashemi Rafsanjani, addressing the problem began. The project soon became a challenge itself, since the moist and weak soil made the tunnel collapse many times during its construction. After seven years (four years more than the construction time for the original tunnel), renovation was finished.

== Tehran-Shomal Freeway ==
The project to connect Tehran to the shores of the Caspian Sea, via a modern toll highway, began in 1995. After three decades, 3 of 4 sections of the Tehran-Shomal Freeway were partially opened to traffic. One section is the 6,400-meter-long Alborz Tunnel that was partially opened in 2021. Due to this new roadway, the Kandovan Tunnel has lost its original importance. As of July 2025, the Kandovan Tunnel is still used by those travelling south, from Karaj, and travelers who want to enjoy the scenery along the way.

== Gallery ==
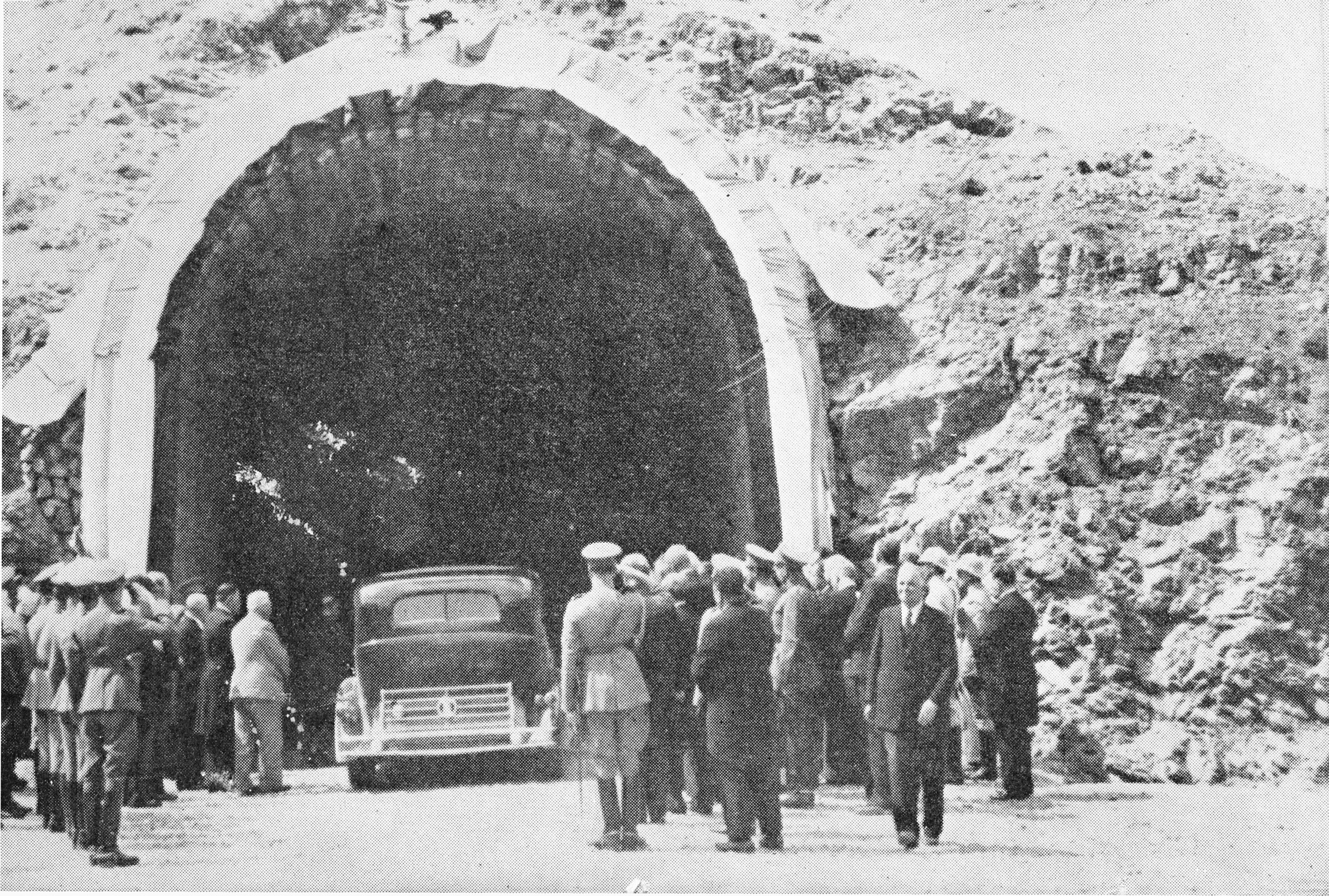
Official opening ceremony, 1938

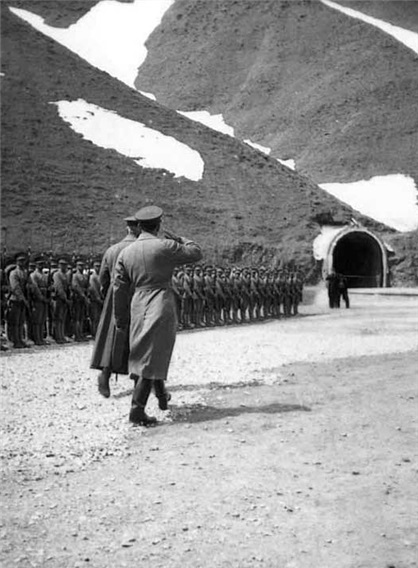
Reza Shah and his crown price (future Shah) at the opening ceremony

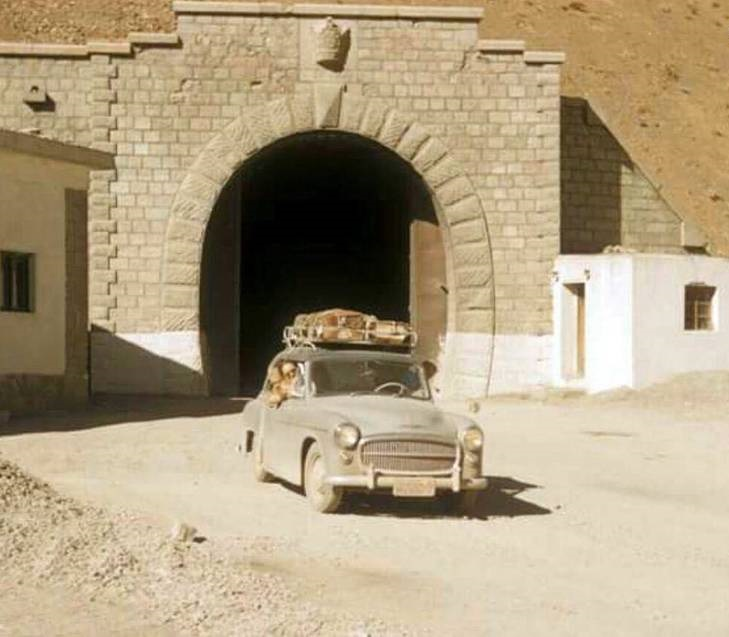
The Kandovan Tunnel in the 1960s

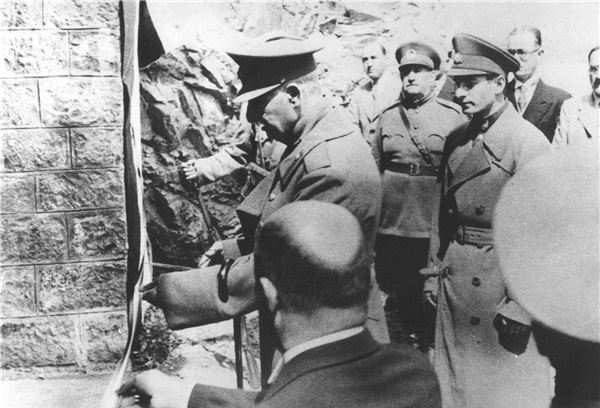
Reza Shah and his crown price (future Shah) at Kandovan

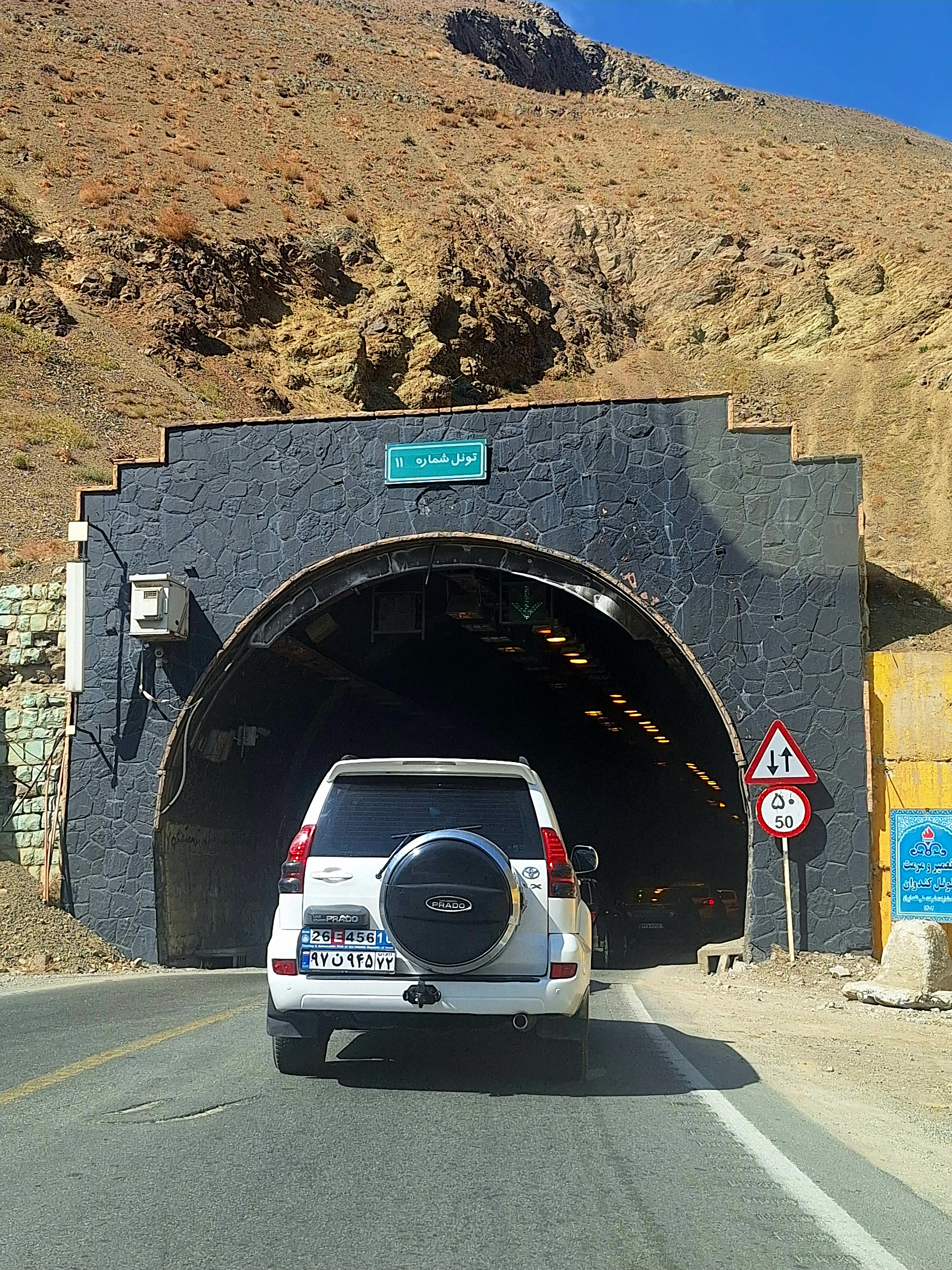
Kandovan Tunnel (southern end) in September 2025
