= Akbarabad-e Pain =

Akbarabad-e Pain اكبرآباد پائين
- Village
- Interactive map of Akbarabad-e Pain
- Coordinates: 36°33′35.4″N 51°22′32.1″E
- Country: Iran
- Province: Mazandaran
- County: Chalus
- Bakhsh: Central
- Rural District: Kelarestaq-e Sharqi

Population (2006)
  - Total: 31
- Time zone: UTC+3:30 (IRST)

Akbarabad-e Pain (Persian: اكبرآباد پائين, also Romanized as Akbarābād-e Pā’īn) is a village in Kelarestaq-e Sharqi Rural District, in the Central District of Chalus County, Mazandaran Province, Iran. At the 2006 census, its population was 21, in 8 families. Decreased from 31 people in 2006.

It is located by Chalus Road and near Chalus river, north of Akbarabad-e Bala village.
