= Farajabad, Chalus =

Farajabad فرج آباد
- Neighbourhood
- Location within Iran
- Coordinates: 36°40′18″N 51°26′51″E
- Country: Iran
- Province: Mazandaran
- County: Chalus
- Bakhsh: Central
- City: Chalus

Population (2011)
  - Total: 590
- Time zone: UTC+3:30 (IRST)

Farajabad (Persian: فرج آباد, also Romanized as Farajābād; also known as Faraḩābād) is a coastal neighborhood in the city of Chalus, Mazandaran Province, Iran.

It was a former village in Kelarestaq-e Sharqi Rural District, in the Central District of Chalus County. At the 2011 census, its population was 590, in 183 families. Down from 706 people in 2006.
