= Mehdiabad, Chalus =

Mehdiabad مهدی آباد
- Village
- Location within Iran
- Coordinates: 36°39′45″N 51°23′07″E
- Country: Iran
- Province: Mazandaran
- County: Chalus
- Bakhsh: Central
- Rural District: Kelarestaq-e Sharqi

Population (2016)
  - Total: 786
- Time zone: UTC+3:30 (IRST)

Mehdiabad (Persian: مهدئ آباد, also Romanized as Mehdiābād; also known as Mahdiābād) is a village in Kelarestaq-e Sharqi Rural District, in the Central District of Chalus County, Mazandaran Province, Iran.

At the time of the 2006 National Census, the village's population was 581 in 155 households. The following census in 2011 counted 720 people in 215 households. The 2016 census measured the population of the village as 786 people in 256 households.
