= Shahrak-e Mustafa Khomeyni =

Shahrak-e Mustafa Khomeyni or Shahrak-e Mostafa Khomeyni (Persian: شهرك مصطفي خميني) may refer to:

- Shahrak-e Mustafa Khomeyni, Mazandaran
- Shahrak-e Mustafa Khomeyni, Tehran
