= Darkala-ye Olya =

Darkala-ye Olya داركلاعليا
- Village
- Location within Iran
- Coordinates: 36°37′50″N 51°23′44″E
- Country: Iran
- Province: Mazandaran
- County: Chalus
- Bakhsh: Central
- Rural District: Kelarestaq-e Sharqi

Population (2006)
  - Total: 671
- Time zone: UTC+3:30 (IRST)

Darkala-ye Olya (Persian: داركلاعليا, also Romanized as Dārkalā-ye ‘Olyā; also known as Dārkalā) is a village in Kelarestaq-e Sharqi Rural District, in the Central District of Chalus County, Mazandaran Province, Iran. At the 2016 census, its population was 553, in 182 families. Down from 671 people in 2006.

It is located south of Chalus city, bordering Mazuposhteh to its west, Aliabad-e Chalus to its northwest, and Shahrara to its south.
