= Najjar Kola, Chalus =

Village in Mazandaran province, Iran

Najjar Kola Persian: نجاركلا
- Village
- Location within Iran
- Coordinates: 36°39′52″N 51°22′29″E
- Country: Iran
- Province: Mazandaran
- County: Chalus
- District: Central
- Rural District: Kelarestaq-e Gharbi

Population (2016)
  - Total: 314
- Time zone: UTC+3:30 (IRST)

Najjar Kola (Persian: نجاركلا) (Note: Also romanized as Najjār Kolā) is a village in Kelarestaq-e Gharbi Rural District of the Central District in Chalus County, Mazandaran province, Iran.

== Demographics ==
=== Population ===
At the time of the 2006 National Census, the village's population was 264 in 74 households. The following census in 2011 counted 286 people in 89 households. The 2016 census measured the population of the village as 314 people in 101 households.
