= Nematabad, Chalus =

Nematabad نعمت آباد
- Village
- Location within Iran
- Coordinates: 36°39′58″N 51°21′44″E
- Country: Iran
- Province: Mazandaran
- County: Chalus
- Bakhsh: Central
- Rural District: Kelarestaq-e Gharbi

Population (2016)
  - Total: 251
- Time zone: UTC+3:30 (IRST)

Nematabad (Persian: نعمت آباد, also Romanized as Ne‘matābād) is a village in Kelarestaq-e Gharbi Rural District, in the Central District of Chalus County, Mazandaran Province, Iran. At the 2016 census, its population was 251, in 91 families. Up from 190 people in 2006.
