= Zavat-e Gharb =

Zavat-e Gharb زوات غرب
- Village
- Location within Iran
- Coordinates: 36°38′51″N 51°22′22″E
- Country: Iran
- Province: Mazandaran
- County: Chalus
- Bakhsh: Central
- Rural District: Kelarestaq-e Sharqi

Population (2016)
  - Total: 304
- Time zone: UTC+3:30 (IRST)

Zavat-e Gharb (Persian: زوات غرب, also Romanized as Z̄avāt-e Gharb; also known as Z̄avāt) is a village in Kelarestaq-e Sharqi Rural District, in the Central District of Chalus County, Mazandaran Province, Iran.

At the time of the 2006 National Census, the village's population was 273 in 68 households. The following census in 2011 counted 277 people in 79 households. The 2016 census measured the population of the village as 304 people in 102 households.
