= Sibdeh =

Sibdeh سيب ده
- Village
- Location within Iran
- Coordinates: 36°40′01″N 51°22′02″E
- Country: Iran
- Province: Mazandaran
- County: Chalus
- Bakhsh: Central
- Rural District: Kelarestaq-e Gharbi

Population (2016)
  - Total: 131
- Time zone: UTC+3:30 (IRST)

Sibdeh (Persian: سيب ده, also Romanized as Sībdeh) is a village in Kelarestaq-e Gharbi Rural District, in the Central District of Chalus County, Mazandaran Province, Iran. At the 2016 census, its population was 131, in 45 families. Up from 103 in 2006.
