= Sinava =

Village in Mazandaran province, Iran

Sinava Persian: سينوا
- Village
- Location within Iran
- Coordinates: 36°37′44″N 51°23′35″E
- Country: Iran
- Province: Mazandaran
- County: Chalus
- District: Central
- Rural District: Kelarestaq-e Sharqi

Population (2016)
  - Total: 1,426
- Time zone: UTC+3:30 (IRST)

Sinava (Persian: سينوا) (Note: Also romanized as Sīnavā) is a village in Kelarestaq-e Sharqi Rural District of the Central District in Chalus County, Mazandaran province, Iran.

== Demographics ==
=== Population ===
At the time of the 2006 National Census, the village's population was 1,342 in 318 households. The following census in 2011 counted 1,467 people in 409 households. The 2016 census measured the population of the village as 1,426 people in 445 households.
