= Naseri Palace =

19th century palace in Iran

Coordinates: 35°56′42″N 51°22′29″E

- کاخ ناصری
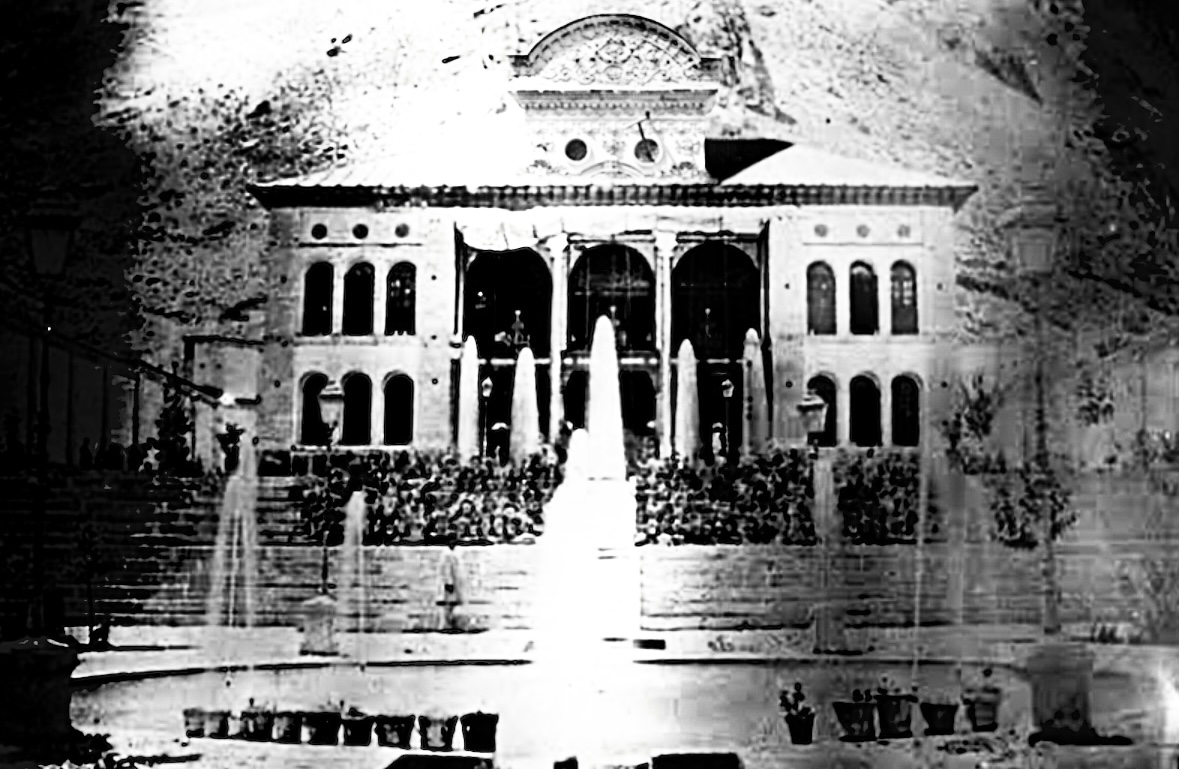
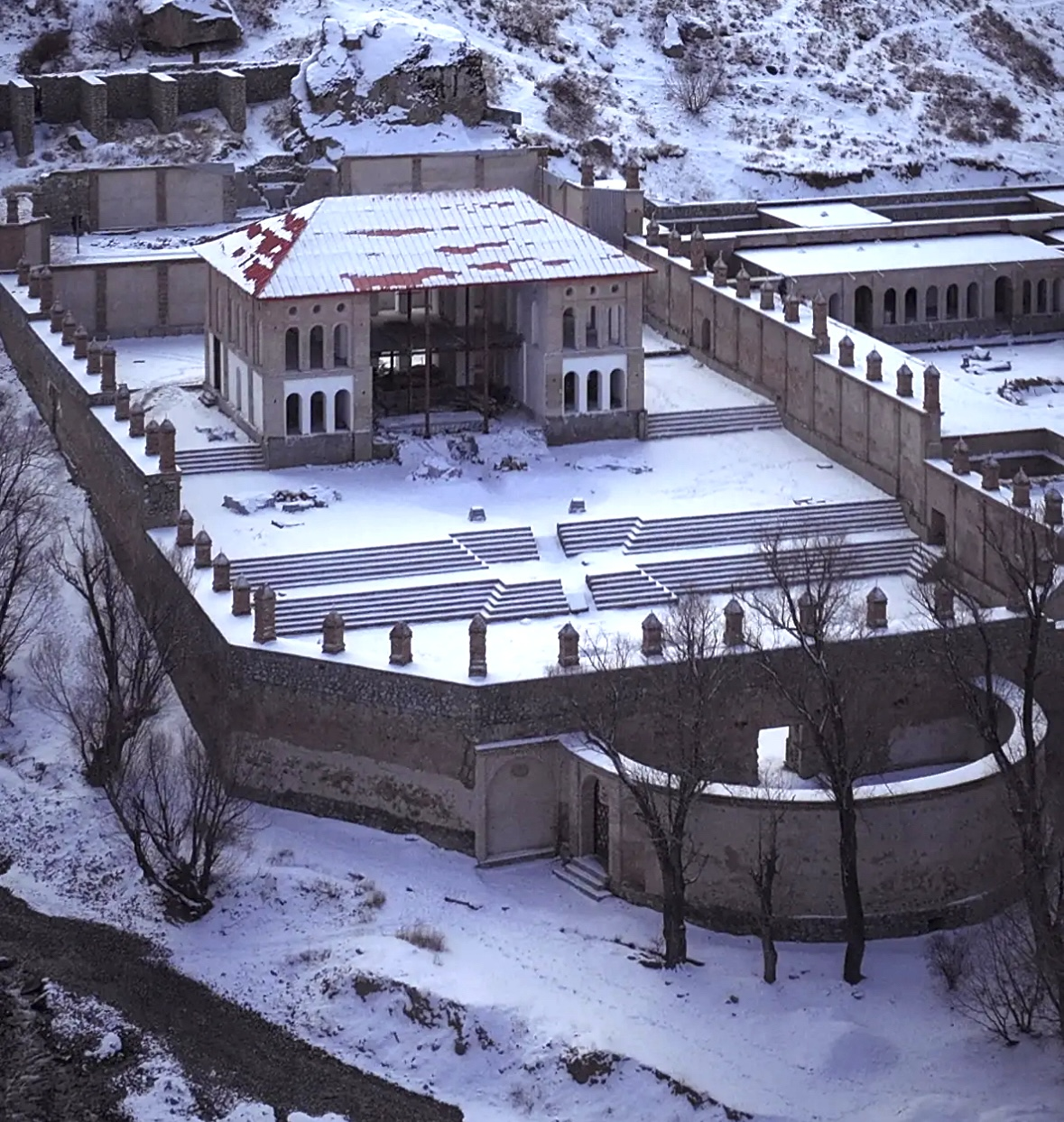
- Top: Naseri palace in 1879, photographed by Abdollah Mirza Qajar; bottom: Naseri Palace in 22 December 2024
- Interactive map of the Naseri Palace area

General information
- Architectural style: Iranian
- Location: Shahrestanak, Alborz
- Year built: 1878–1881

The Naseri Palace (Persian: کاخ ناصری), or Shahrestanak Palace (Persian: کاخ شهرستانک), is a 19th-century royal summer residence in Shahrestanak, a mountain village in the Alborz province, Iran. Commissioned by the Qajar ruler Naser al-Din Shah, the complex was constructed between 1878 and 1881 as a scenic retreat along the mountain route connecting Tehran to the northern province of Mazandaran.

Following a long period of abandonment and structural decay, the historic palace underwent an extensive multi-year revitalization project that was largely completed between 2021 and 2026. The fully restored complex is repurposed to serve as a boutique hotel, restaurant, art gallery, and cultural tourism hub.

== Gallery ==
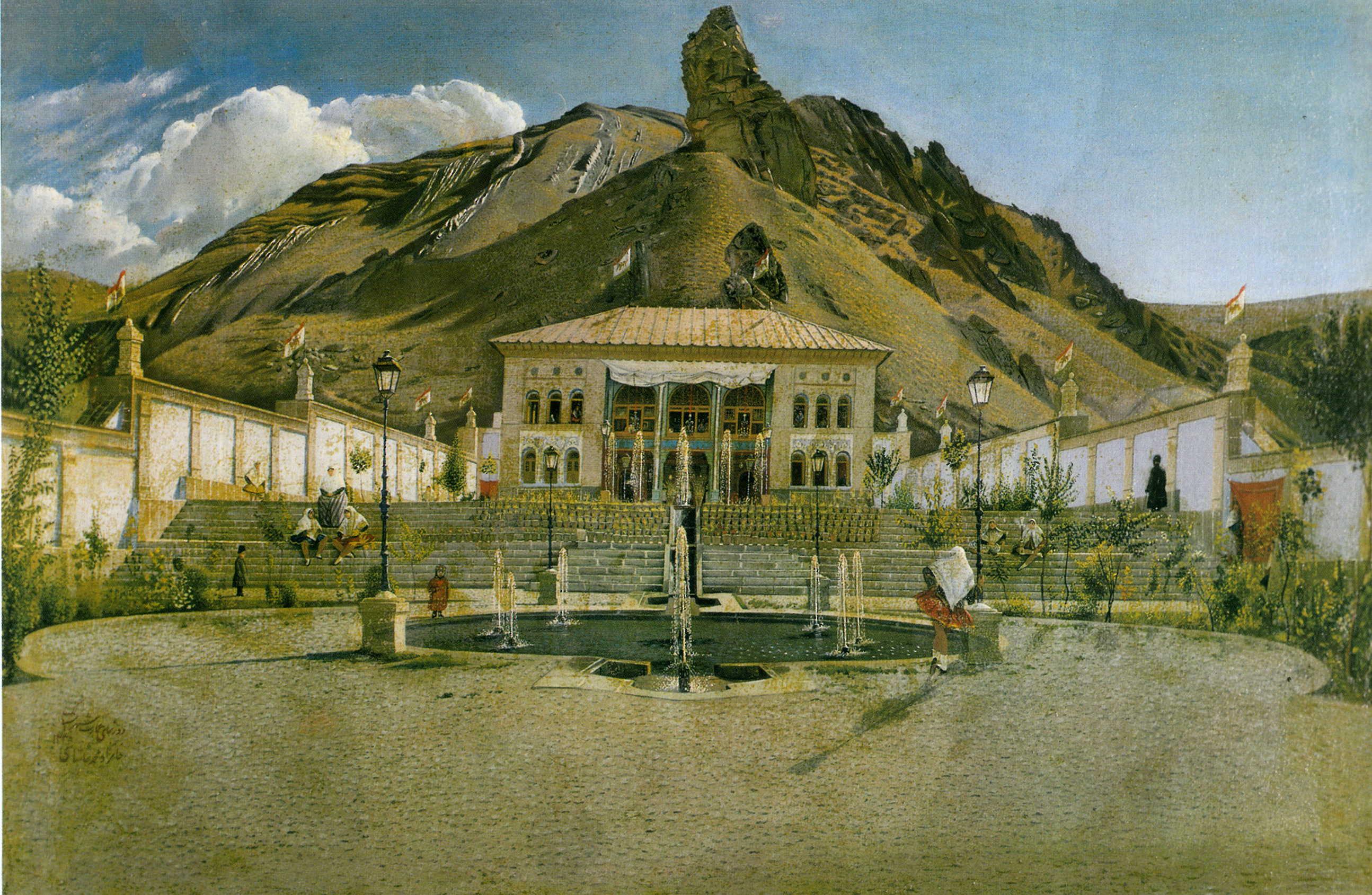
Oil painting of Shahrestanak Palace by Kamal-ol-molk, 1887

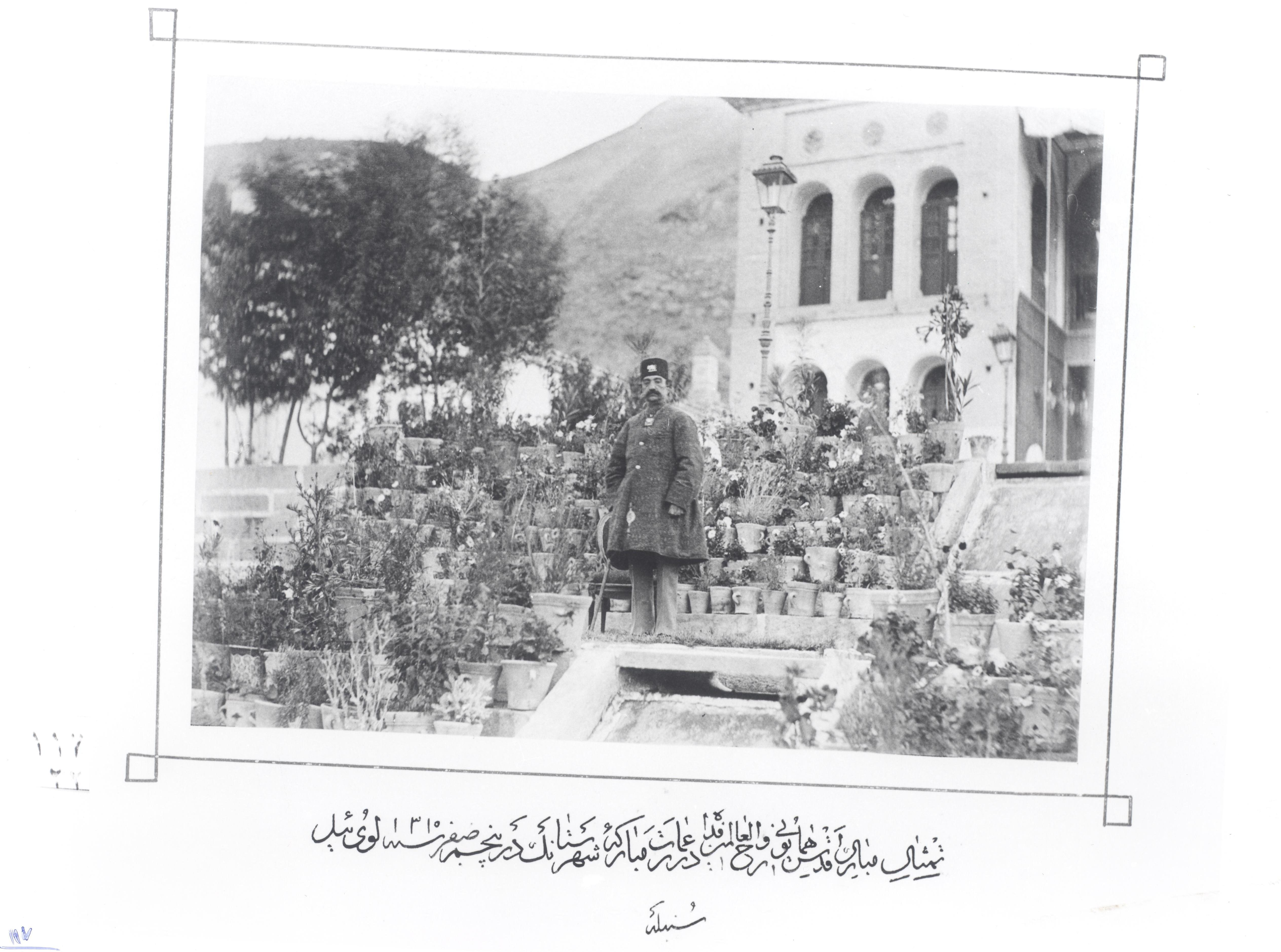
Naser al-Din Shah at the palace, August 1892

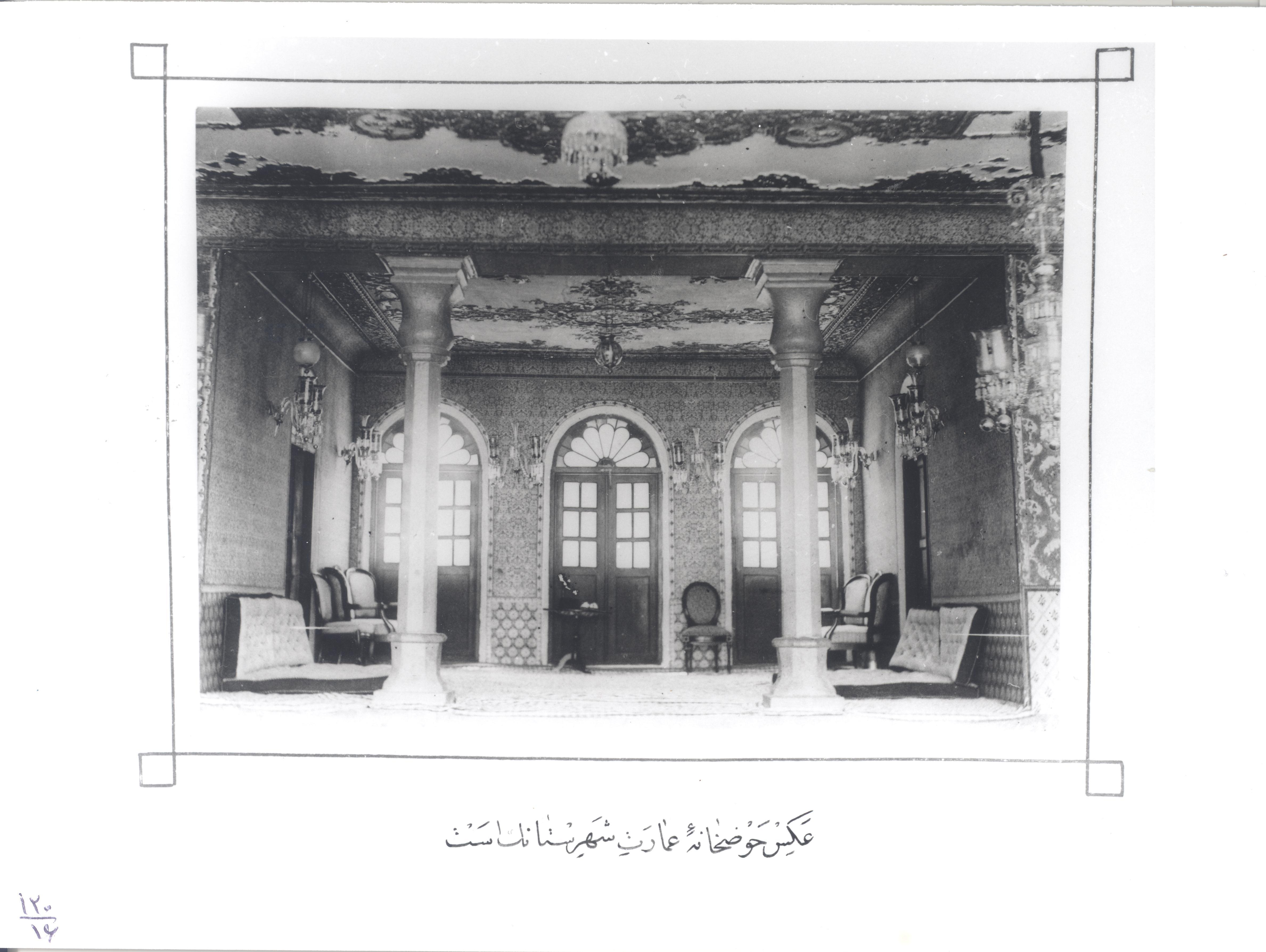
The interior of the palace by Hovsep Khan Hovsepiants, 1894/95

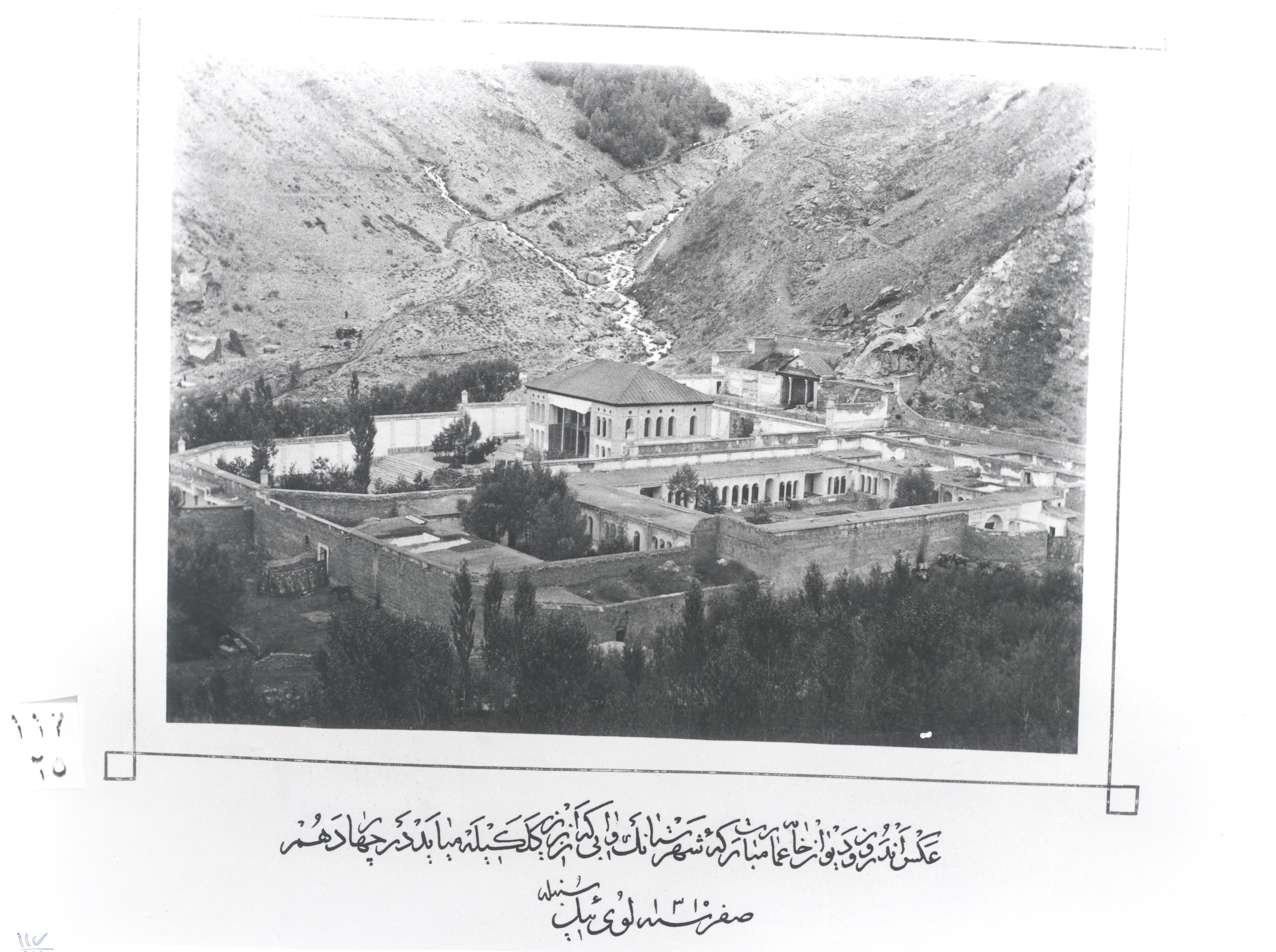
View of the palace, 1892
