= Tazehabad, Chalus =

Village in Mazandaran province, Iran

Tazehabad Persian: تازه اباد
- Village
- Location within Iran
- Coordinates: 36°39′47″N 51°23′41″E
- Country: Iran
- Province: Mazandaran
- County: Chalus
- District: Central
- Rural District: Kelarestaq-e Sharqi

Population (2016)
  - Total: 1,897
- Time zone: UTC+3:30 (IRST)

Tazehabad (Persian: تازه اباد) (Note: Also romanized as Tāzehābād) is a village in, and the capital of, Kelarestaq-e Sharqi Rural District in the Central District of Chalus County, Mazandaran province, Iran.

== Demographics ==
=== Population ===
At the time of the 2006 National Census, the village's population was 1,042 in 272 households. The following census in 2011 counted 1,527 people in 469 households. The 2016 census measured the population of the village as 1,897 people in 614 households.
