= Gil Kola, Chalus =

Village in Mazandaran province, Iran

Gil Kola Persian: گيل كلا
- Village
- Location within Iran
- Coordinates: 36°39′57″N 51°22′52″E
- Country: Iran
- Province: Mazandaran
- County: Chalus
- District: Central
- Rural District: Kelarestaq-e Gharbi

Population (2016)
  - Total: 316
- Time zone: UTC+3:30 (IRST)

Gil Kola (Persian: گيل كلا) (Note: Also romanized as Gīl Kolā; also known as Gīlkalā) is a village in Kelarestaq-e Gharbi Rural District of the Central District in Chalus County, Mazandaran province, Iran.

== Demographics ==
=== Population ===
At the time of the 2006 National Census, the village's population was 240 in 64 households. The following census in 2011 counted 264 people in 88 households. The 2016 census measured the population of the village as 316 people in 108 households.
