= Mohammadabad, Chalus =

Mohammadabad محمدآباد
- Village
- Location within Iran
- Coordinates: 36°35′28″N 51°23′04″E
- Country: Iran
- Province: Mazandaran
- County: Chalus
- Bakhsh: Central
- Rural District: Kelarestaq-e Sharqi

Population (2016)
  - Total: 43
- Time zone: UTC+3:30 (IRST)

Mohammadabad (Persian: محمدآباد, also Romanized as Moḩammadābād) is a village in Kelarestaq-e Sharqi Rural District, in the Central District of Chalus County, Mazandaran Province, Iran.

At the time of the 2006 National Census, the village's population was 35 in 8 households. The following census in 2011 counted 32 people in 10 households. The 2016 census measured the population of the village as 43 people in 15 households.
