= Mian Deh, Chalus =

Mian Deh ميانده
- village
- Location within Iran
- Coordinates: 36°40′45″N 51°23′19″E
- Country: Iran
- Province: Mazandaran
- County: Chalus
- Bakhsh: Central
- Rural District: Kelarestaq-e Gharbi

Area
  - Total: 0.44 km^{2} (0.17 sq mi)
- Elevation: 1,698 m (5,571 ft)

Population (2016)
  - Total: 272
  - Density: 620/km^{2} (1,600/sq mi)
- Time zone: UTC+3:30 (IRST)

Mian Deh (Persian: ميانده, also Romanized as Mīān Deh) is a village in Kelarestaq-e Gharbi Rural District, in the Central District of Chalus County, Mazandaran Province, Iran. At the 2016 census, its population was 272, in 88 families. Down from 303 in 2006.
