= Pichdeh, Chalus =

Pichdeh پيچده
- Village
- Location within Iran
- Coordinates: 36°40′17″N 51°22′16″E
- Country: Iran
- Province: Mazandaran
- County: Chalus
- Bakhsh: Central
- Rural District: Kelarestaq-e Gharbi

Population (2016)
  - Total: 125
- Time zone: UTC+3:30 (IRST)

Pichdeh (Persian: پيچده, also Romanized as Pīchdeh; also known as Pīchīdeh and Pījīdeh) is a village in Kelarestaq-e Gharbi Rural District, in the Central District of Chalus County, Mazandaran Province, Iran. As of the 2016 census, its population was 125, in 41 families.
