= Tehran-Shomal Freeway =

Freeway 3
- 3 آزادراه
- Tehran-Shomal Freeway آزادراه تهران - شمال

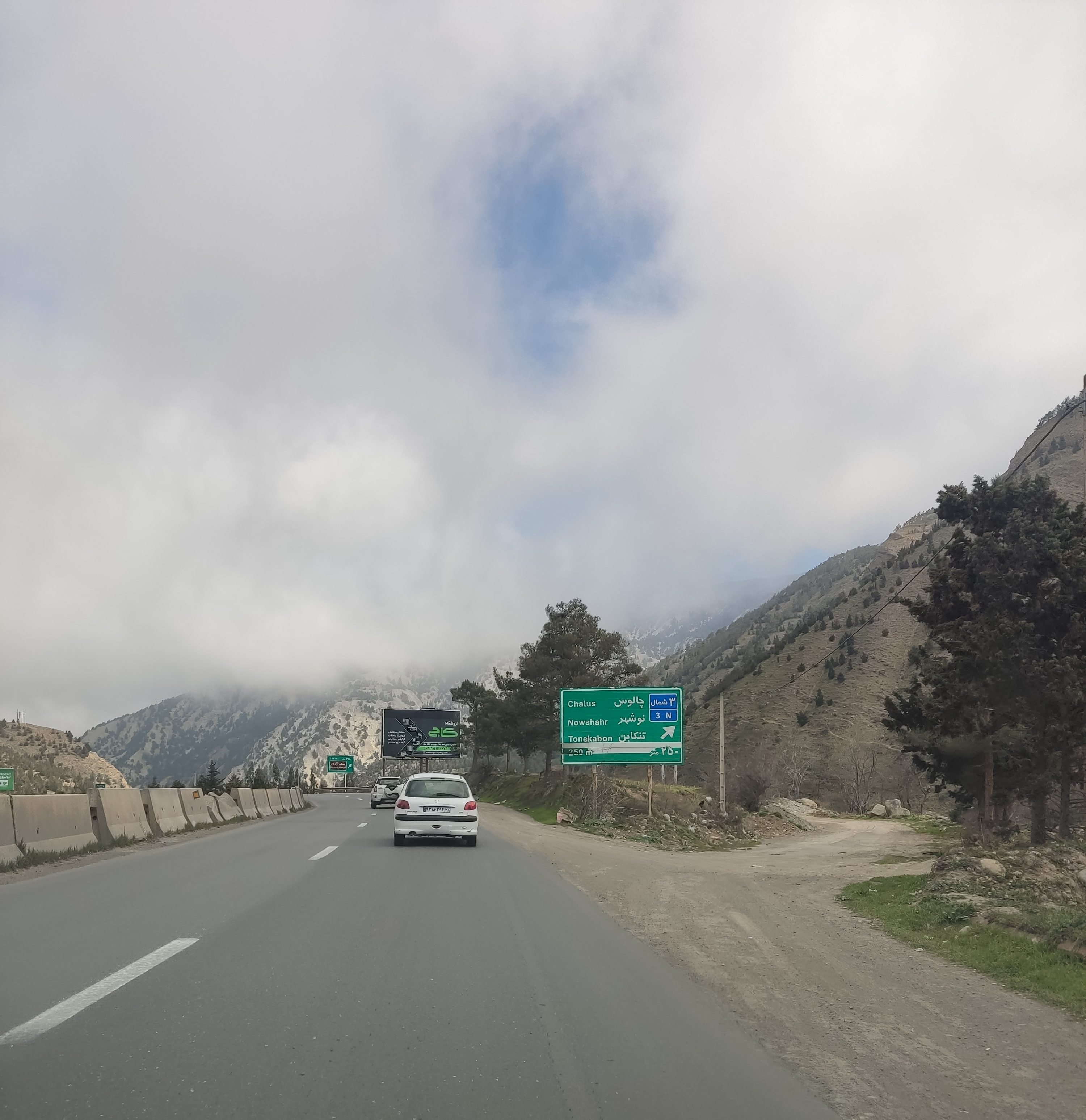

Route information
- Length: 121 km (75 mi)

Major junctions
- From: Chalus, Mazandaran; Road 22 (Chalus-Nowshahr Bypass Expressway)
- Road 59
- To: Tehran, Tehran; Azadegan Expressway; Hemmat Expressway

Location
- Country: Iran
- Provinces: Tehran, Alborz, Mazandaran
- Major cities: Tehran, Tehran; Chalus, Mazandaran

Highway system
- Highways in Iran; Freeways

Freeway 3, or more commonly known as Tehran-Shomal Freeway (Persian: آزادراه تهران - شمال; literally: Tehran-North Freeway) or Tehran-Chalus Freeway will be a freeway in Northern Iran, connecting Tehran to cities of western Mazandaran. Currently, sections 1, 2 & 4 are in service and section 3 is under construction. The freeway runs parallel to Road 59, the old road connecting Karaj to Chalus.

== Section 1 ==
This section is from interchange with Azadegan Expressway and Hemmat Expressway in northwestern Tehran city (Municipality District 21) to Doab, Shahrestanak, Alborz Province. This section opened for test service on February 12, 2020, and officially opened on February 25, 2020. The section is 32 km long, with 28 tunnels having an overall length of 28.4 km on both sides. The longest tunnel is Talun Tunnel which is 4870 m long.

== Sections 2 and 3 ==
Section 2 is from Doab, Shahrestanak, Alborz to Pol-e Zanguleh, Kelardasht District, Mazandaran Province. The total length is 25 km. The section has 20 tunnels with overall length of 24.2 km. The longest tunnel is Alborz Tunnel with a length of 6378 m. Section 3 is from Pol-e Zanguleh, Kelardasht District, Mazandaran Province to Marzan Abad, Kelardasht District, Mazandaran Province with a length of 46 km. This section will have 92 tunnels with overall length of 33.5 km. Section 2 was completed in 2023, but Section 3 is still under construction.

== Section 4 ==
Section 4 is from Marzan Abad, Kelardasht District, Mazandaran Province to Chalus. This section is 20 km long. It has 4 tunnels with an overall length of 1400 m. This section was opened in March 2013.

== Direction ==
From North to South
Road 22; East to Nowshahr-Sari-Gorgan; West to Tonekabon-Ramsar-Rasht
Chalous
Chalous Toll Station
Road 59; North to Chalous-Nowshahr; South to Marzanabad-Karaj-Tehran
Under Construction
Road 59
Under Construction
Road 59; North to Marzanabad-Chalous-Nowshahr; South to Gach Sar-Karaj-Tehran
Alborz Tonel
Mazandaran Province; Alborz Province
Alborz Tonel
Road 59; North to Gach Sar-Chalous-Nowshahr; South to Tehran
Alborz Province; Tehran Province
Tehran Toll Station
Tehran
Azadegan Expressway; North to Gach Sar-Nowshahr-Chalous; West to Kharrazi Expressway-Karaj; East to Hemmat Expressway
From South to North
