= Shahrak-e Shahid Rajai, Mazandaran =

Village in Mazandaran province, Iran

Shahid Rajaee Town Persian: شهرك شهيدرجائي
- Town
- Location within Iran
- Coordinates: 36°41′05″N 51°23′12″E
- Country: Iran
- Province: Mazandaran
- County: Chalus
- District: Central
- Rural District: Kelarestaq-e Gharbi

Population (2016)
  - Total: 337
- Time zone: UTC+3:30 (IRST)

Shahid Rajaee Town (Persian: شهرك شهيد رجائي, romanized: Shahrak-e Shahid Rajaee) is a town in Kelarestaq-e Gharbi Rural District of the Central District in Chalus County, Mazandaran province, Iran.

== Demographics ==
=== Population ===
At the time of the 2006 National Census, the village's population was 460 in 127 households. The following census in 2011 counted 417 people in 122 households. The 2016 census measured the population of the village as 337 people in 108 households.
