= Shahrestanak, Alborz =

Village in Alborz province, Iran

Shahrestanak شهرستانک
- Village
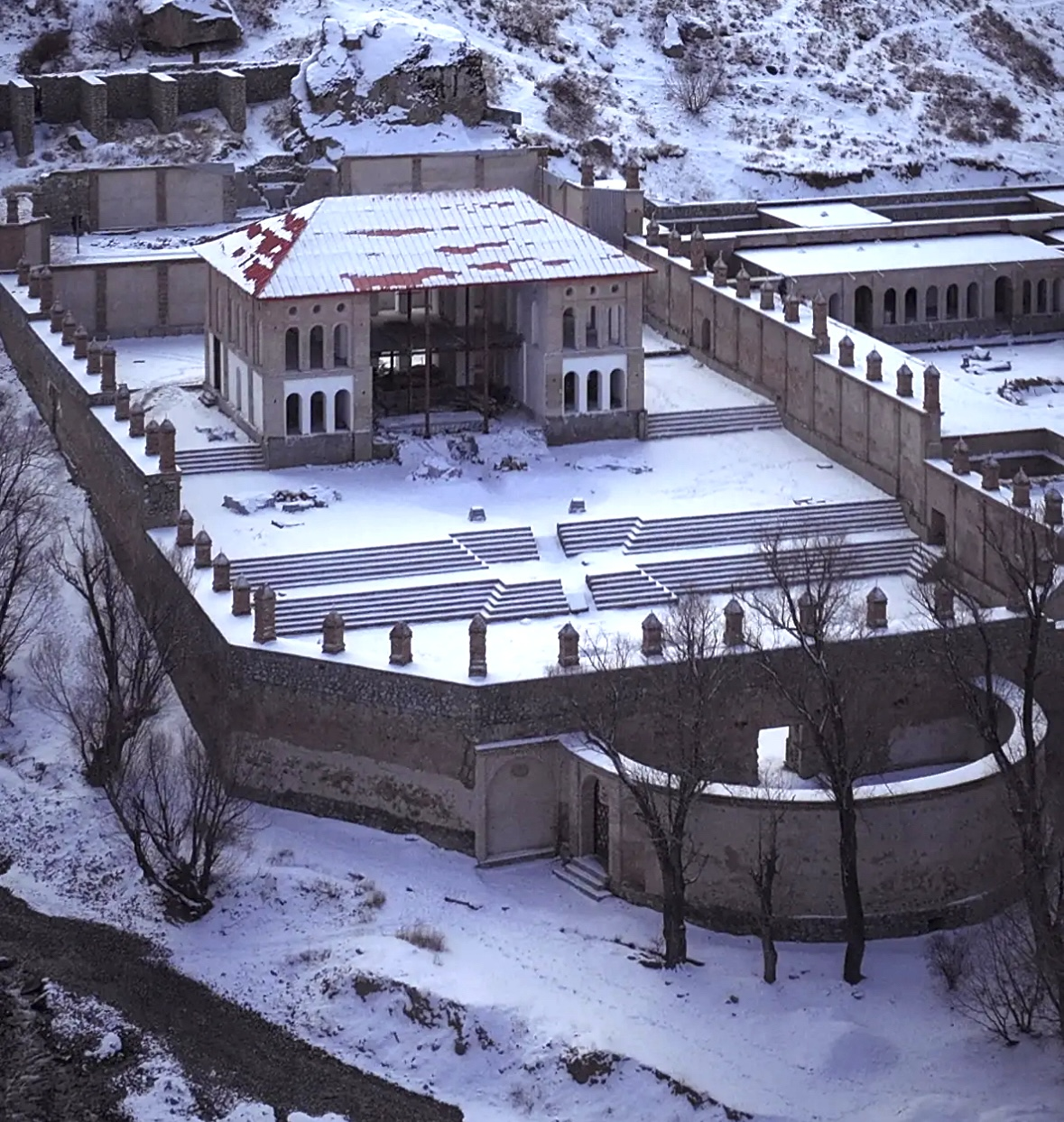
- The Naseri Palace, a royal summer residence in Shahrestanak

- Location within Iran
- Coordinates: 35°58′11″N 51°21′13″E
- Country: Iran
- Province: Alborz
- County: Karaj
- District: Asara
- Rural District: Asara

Population (2016)
  - Total: 1,307
- Time zone: UTC+3:30 (IRST)

Shahrestanak (Persian: شهرستانک) (Note: Also romanized as Shahrestānak; also known as Shahristānak) is a village in Asara Rural District of Asara District in Karaj County, Alborz province, Iran. The village is home to the Naseri Palace.

== Demographics ==
=== Population ===
At the time of the 2006 National Census, the village's population was 1,048 in 317 households, when it was in Tehran province. The 2016 census measured the population of the village as 1,307 people in 482 households, by which time the county had been separated from the province in the establishment of Alborz province. Shahrestanak was the most populous village in its rural district.
