= Gach Sar =

Village in Alborz province, Iran

Gach Sar Persian: گچسر
- Village
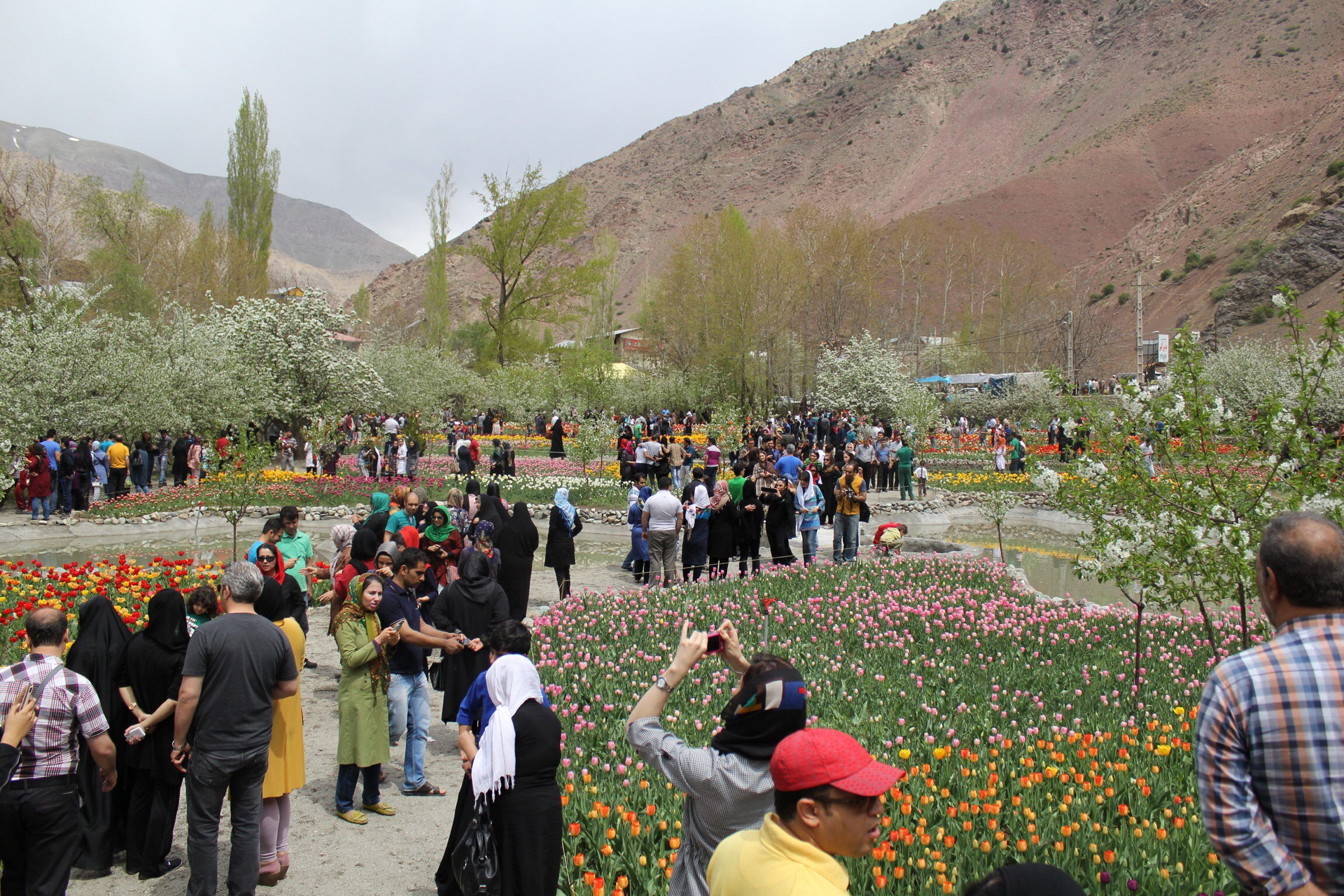
- Gach Sar Tulip Garden

- Location within Iran
- Country: Iran
- Province: Alborz
- County: Karaj
- District: Asara
- Rural District: Nesa

Population (2016)
  - Total: 141
- Time zone: UTC+3:30 (IRST)

Gach Sar (Persian: گچسر) (Note: Also romanized as Gach-i-Sar and Getschesar) is a village in Nesa Rural District of Asara District in Karaj County, Alborz province, Iran.

Located on the main road from Tehran to Chalus on the Caspian coast, 7 km south of the Kandavan Tunnel, Gach Sar has farmlands irrigated by the Karaj River, producing fruits, as well as plants for animal fodder.

The village has a gypsum mine, and a hotel built during the reign of Reza Shah Pahlavi as a royal lodge. The Qajar-era monarch Naser al-Din Shah vacationed here twice.

== Demographics ==
=== Population ===
At the time of the 2006 National Census, the village's population was 133 in 35 households, when it was in Tehran province. The 2016 census measured the population of the village as 141 people in 45 households, by which time the county had been separated from the province in the establishment of Alborz province.

== Wildlife ==
Naturally occurring local plants include marjoram, bugloss, and marshmallows. Wild animals include jackals, wolves, foxes, boars, and bears.
