= Zavat-e Sharq =

Village in Mazandaran province, Iran

Zavat-e Sharq Persian: زوات شرق
- Village
- Location within Iran
- Coordinates: 36°38′53″N 51°22′12″E
- Country: Iran
- Province: Mazandaran
- County: Chalus
- District: Central
- Rural District: Kelarestaq-e Sharqi

Population (2016)
  - Total: 1,276
- Time zone: UTC+3:30 (IRST)

Zavat-e Sharq (Persian: زوات شرق) (Note: Also romanized as Z̄avāt-e Sharq; also known as Zavāt and Zuvād) is a village in Kelarestaq-e Sharqi Rural District of the Central District in Chalus County, Mazandaran province, Iran.

== Demographics ==
=== Population ===
At the time of the 2006 National Census, the village's population was 1,225 in 305 households. The following census in 2011 counted 1,310 people in 386 households. The 2016 census measured the population of the village as 1,276 people in 412 households.
