= Hoseynabad-e Sofla, Mazandaran =

Village in Mazandaran province, Iran

Hoseynabad-e Sofla Persian: حسين آباد سفلی
- Village
- Location within Iran
- Coordinates: 36°39′33″N 51°24′24″E
- Country: Iran
- Province: Mazandaran
- County: Chalus
- District: Central
- Rural District: Kelarestaq-e Sharqi

Population (2016)
  - Total: 1,950
- Time zone: UTC+3:30 (IRST)

Hoseynabad-e Sofla (Persian: حسين آباد سفلی) (Note: Also romanized as Ḩoseynābād-e Soflá) is a village in Kelarestaq-e Sharqi Rural District of the Central District in Chalus County, Mazandaran province, Iran.

== Demographics ==
=== Population ===
At the time of the 2006 National Census, the village's population was 1,344 in 343 households. The following census in 2011 counted 1,635 people in 479 households. The 2016 census measured the population of the village as 1,950 people in 606 households. It was the most populous village in its rural district.
