= Kelarestaq-e Gharbi Rural District =

Rural district in Mazandaran province, Iran

Kelarestaq-e Gharbi Rural District Persian: دهستان كلارستاق غربی
- Rural District
- Location within Iran
- Coordinates: 36°39′N 51°20′E
- Country: Iran
- Province: Mazandaran
- County: Chalus
- District: Central
- Established: 1987
- Capital: Hachirud

Population (2016)
  - Total: 4,854
- Time zone: UTC+3:30 (IRST)

Kelarestaq-e Gharbi Rural District (Persian: دهستان كلارستاق غربی) is in the Central District of Chalus County, Mazandaran province, Iran. It is administered from the city of Hachirud.

== Demographics ==
=== Population ===
At the time of the 2006 National Census, the rural district's population was 13,953 in 3,877 households. There were 13,798 inhabitants in 4,342 households at the following census of 2011. The 2016 census measured the population of the rural district as 4,854 in 1,656 households. The most populous of its 15 villages was Sardab Rud, with 685 people.

=== Other settlements in the rural district ===
- Ahangar Kola
- Gil Kola
- Karimabad
- Kelachan
- Mian Deh
- Mianki
- Najjar Kola
- Nematabad
- Owja Kolah
- Pichdeh
- Shahrak-e Namak Abrud
- Shahrak-e Shahid Rejai
- Sibdeh
