= Chalus Road =

Road in Iran

Road 59
- جاده 59
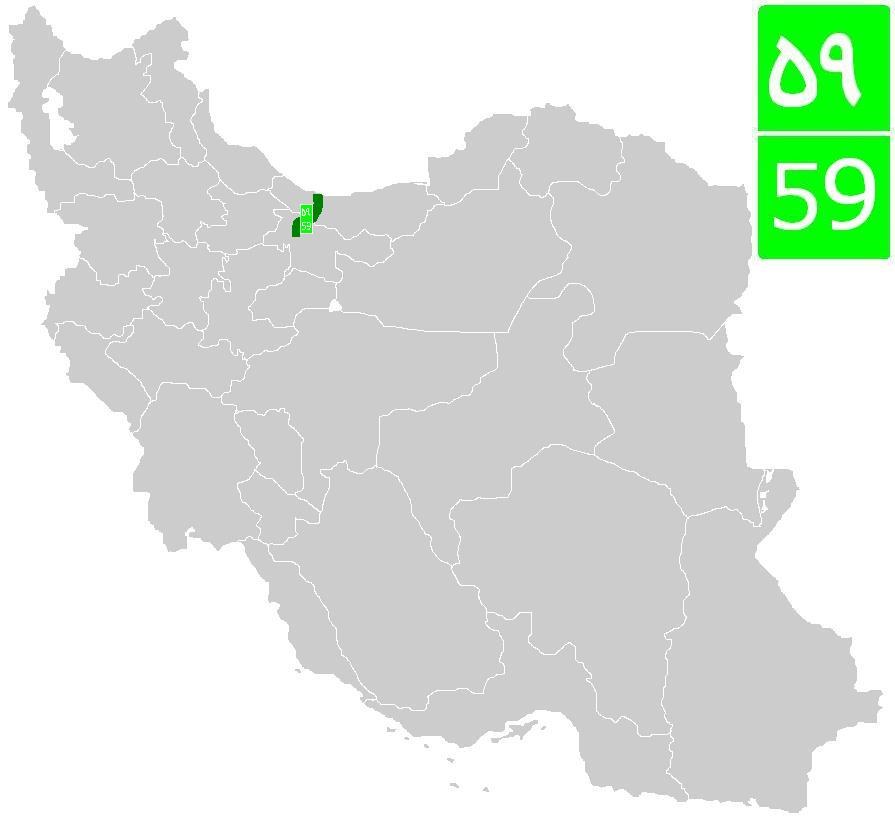

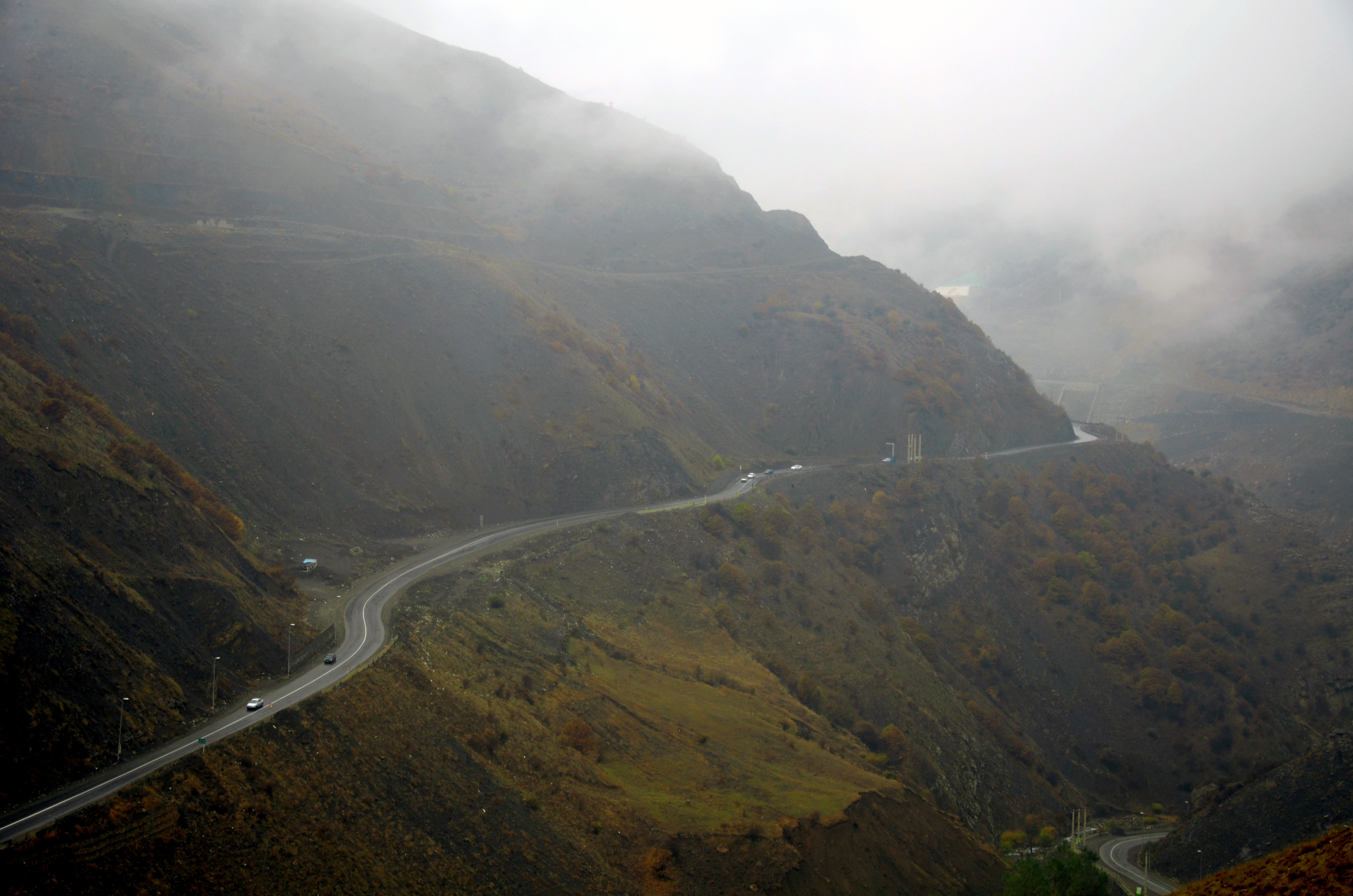

Route information
- Length: 160 km (99 mi)

Major junctions
- From: Karaj, Alborz; Freeway 2
- Tehran-Shomal Freeway
- To: Chalus, Mazandaran; Road 22 (Chalus Ring Road)

Location
- Country: Iran
- Provinces: Alborz, Mazandaran

Highway system
- Highways in Iran; Freeways

Chalus Road (Persian: جاده چالوس), officially known as "Road 59" is one of the most popular and busiest roads in Iran, which begins in Alborz province and connecting Karaj and Tehran to Chalus on the Caspian Sea coasts. Chalus road is also important for many people of Greater Tehran to go to popular tourist attractions in the Northern Iran on weekends and holidays. The main tunnel that crosses Alborz Massif on this road is Kandovan, which was built in 1938 as one of the first road tunnels in Iran.
