= Kelarestaq-e Sharqi Rural District =

Rural district in Mazandaran province, Iran

Kelarestaq-e Sharqi Rural District Persian: دهستان كلارستاق شرقی
- Rural District
- Location within Iran
- Coordinates: 36°36′N 51°22′E
- Country: Iran
- Province: Mazandaran
- County: Chalus
- District: Central
- Established: 1987
- Capital: Tazehabad

Population (2016)
  - Total: 15,776
- Time zone: UTC+3:30 (IRST)

Kelarestaq-e Sharqi Rural District (Persian: دهستان كلارستاق شرقی) is in the Central District of Chalus County, Mazandaran province, Iran. Its capital is the village of Tazehabad.

== Demographics ==
=== Population ===
At the time of the 2006 National Census, the rural district's population was 24,530 in 6,433 households. There were 26,537 inhabitants in 7,926 households at the following census of 2011. The 2016 census measured the population of the rural district as 15,776 in 5,069 households. The most populous of its 26 villages was Hoseynabad-e Sofla, with 1,950 people.

=== All villages in the rural district ===
- Akbarabad-e Bala
- Akbarabad-e Chalus
- Akbarabad-e Pain
- Aliabad-e Chalus
- Arab Kheyl
- Chenes
- Darkala-ye Olya
- Hoseynabad-e Olya
- Hoseynabad-e Sofla
- Mazuposhteh
- Mehdiabad
- Mohammadabad
- Pol-e Karat
- Sar Cheshmeh
- Shahrara
- Sinava
- Sinava Cheshmeh
- Talaju
- Tazehabad
- Tejen Kola-ye Olya
- Tejen Kola-ye Sofla
- Zavat-e Gharb
- Zavat-e Sharq
