= Chalus, Iran =

City in Mazandaran province, Iran

Chalus Persian: چالوس
- City
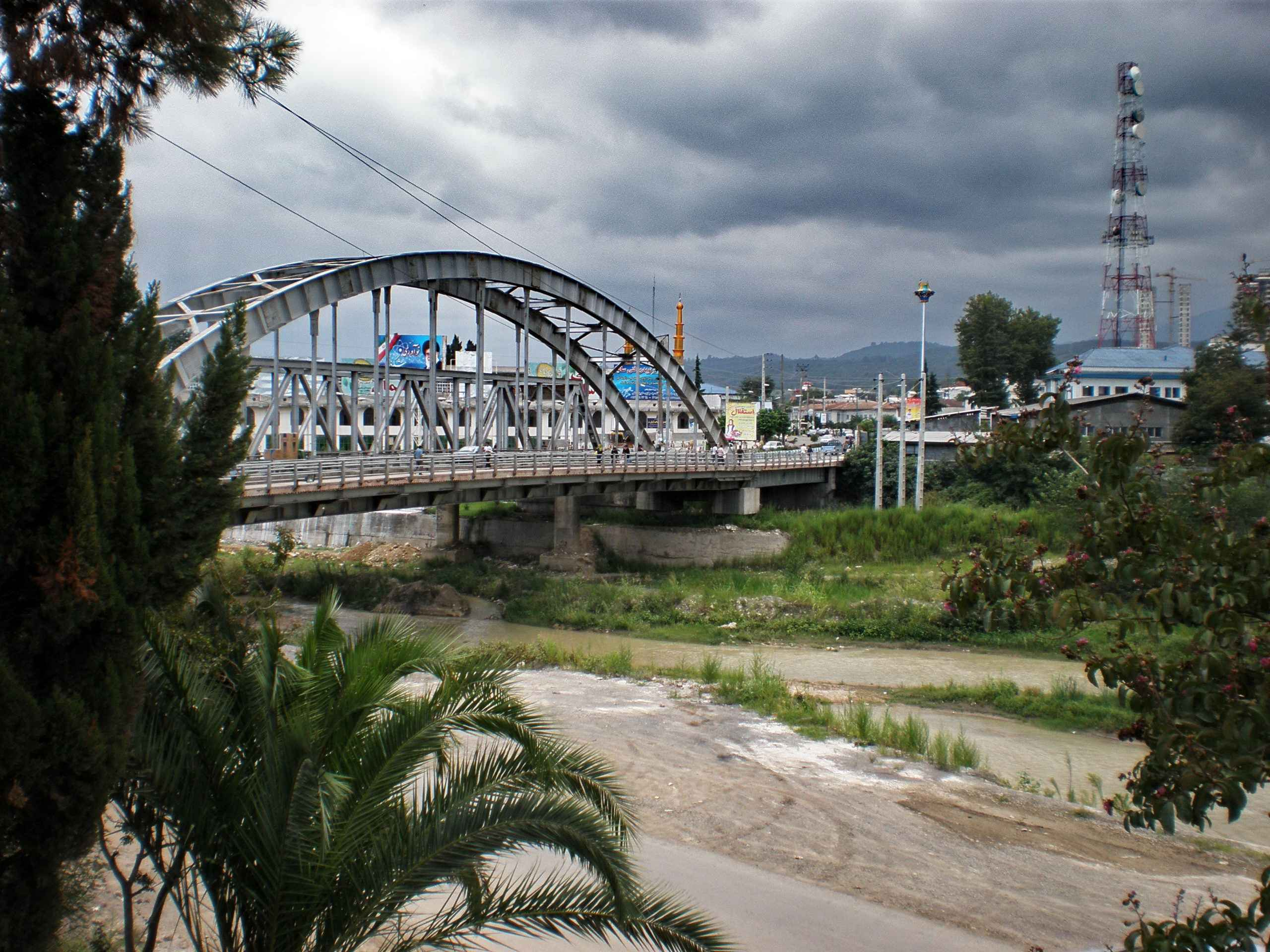
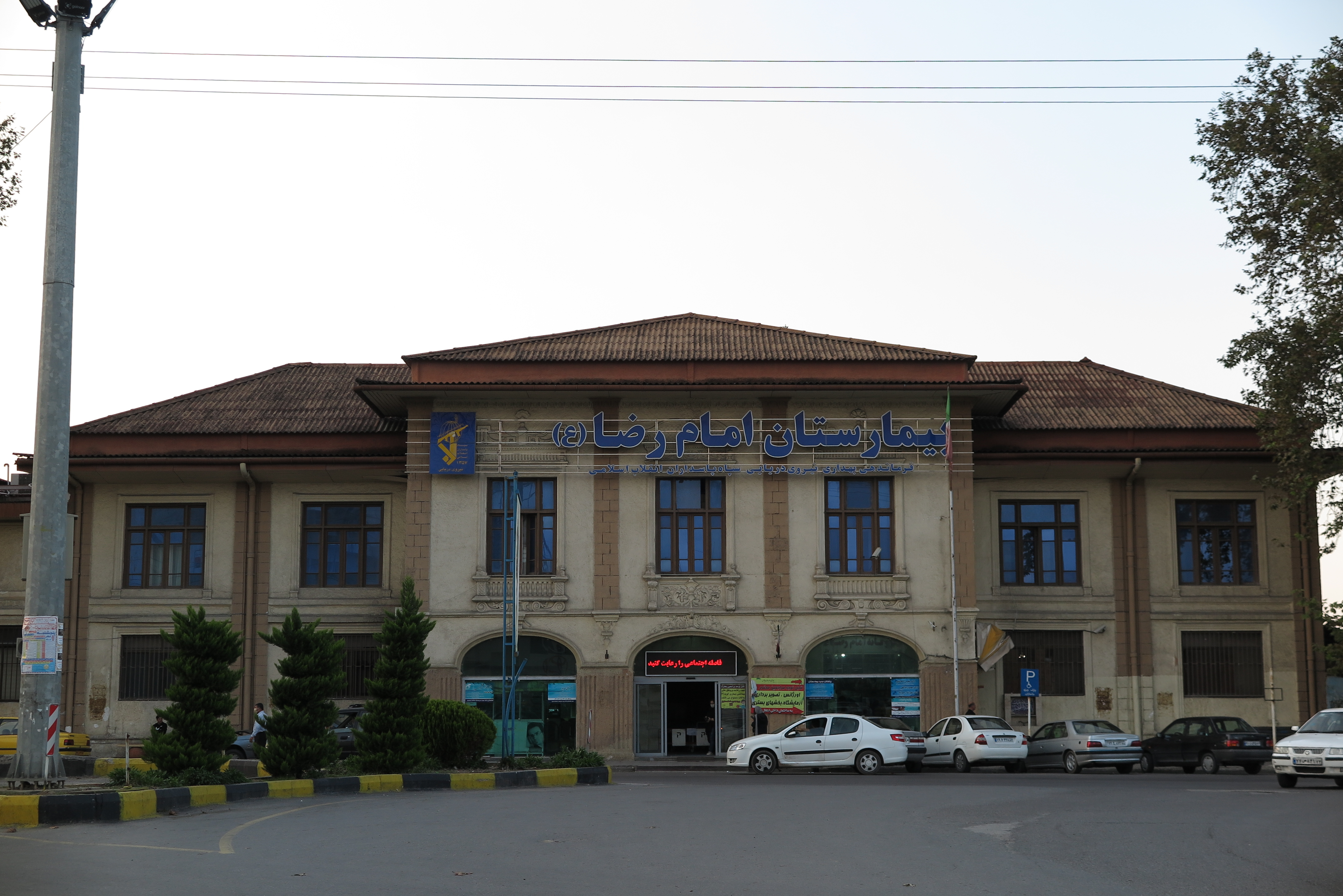
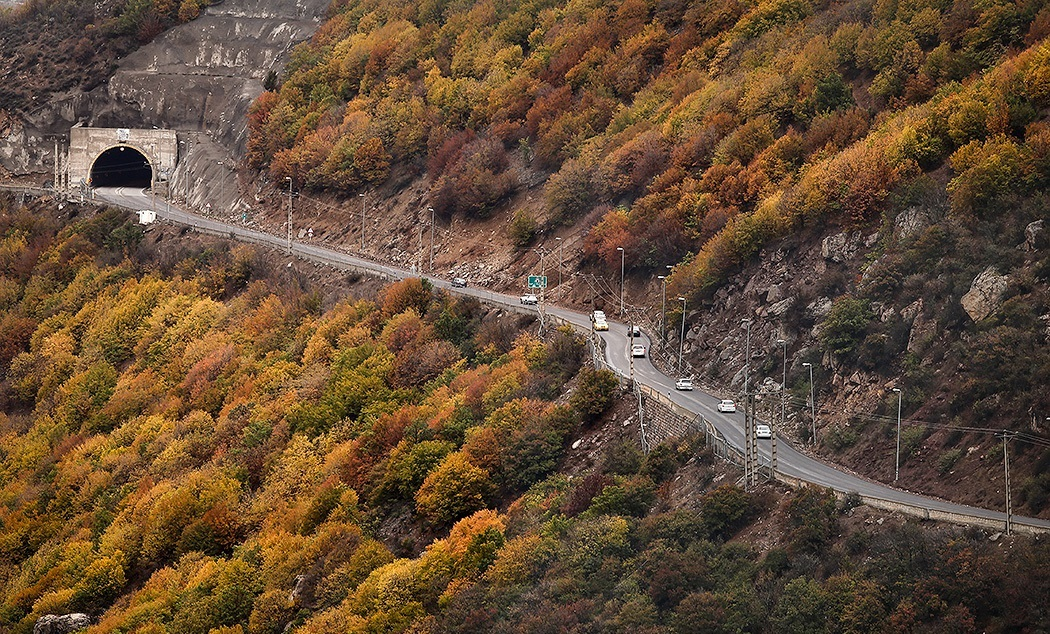
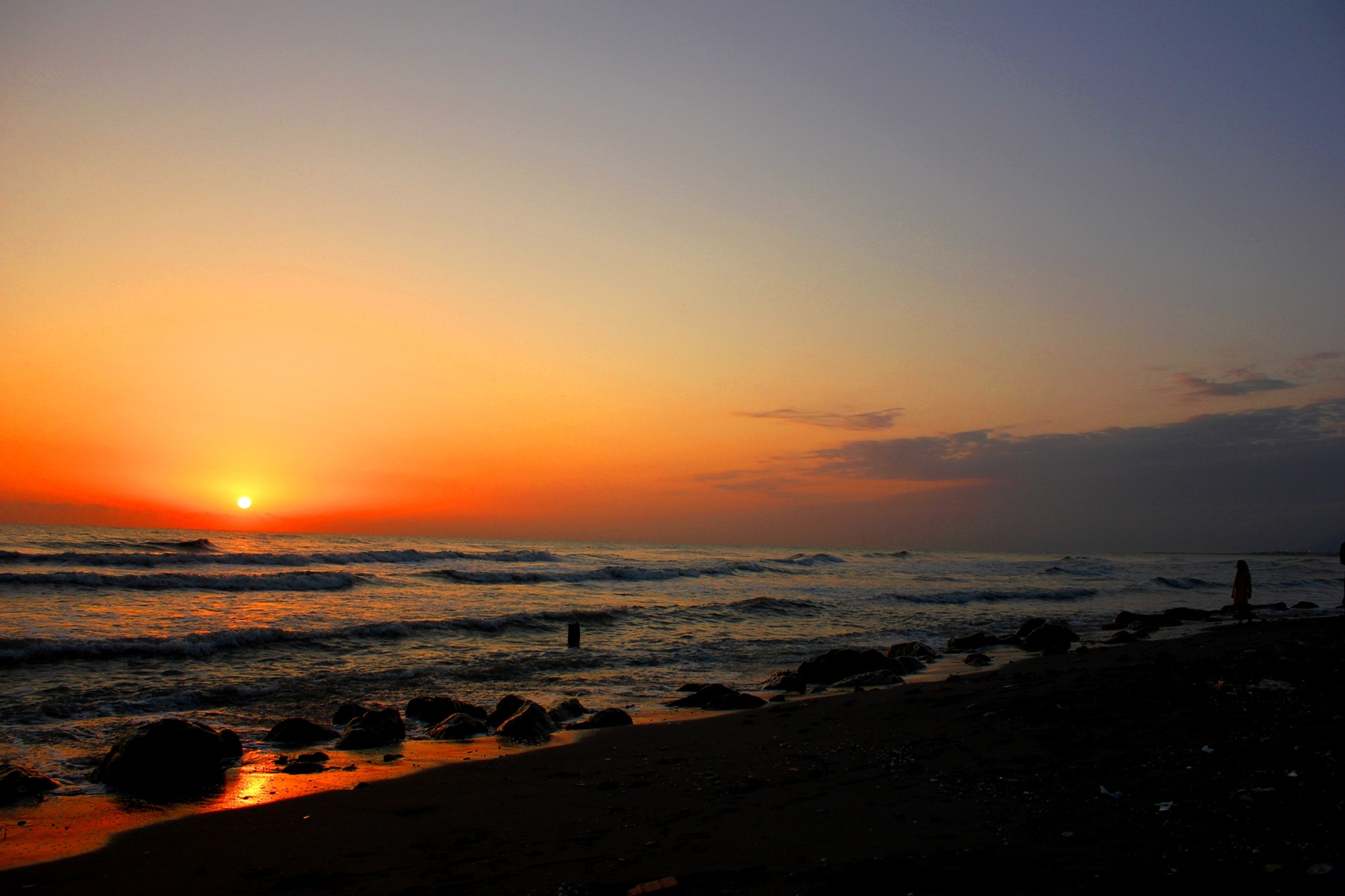

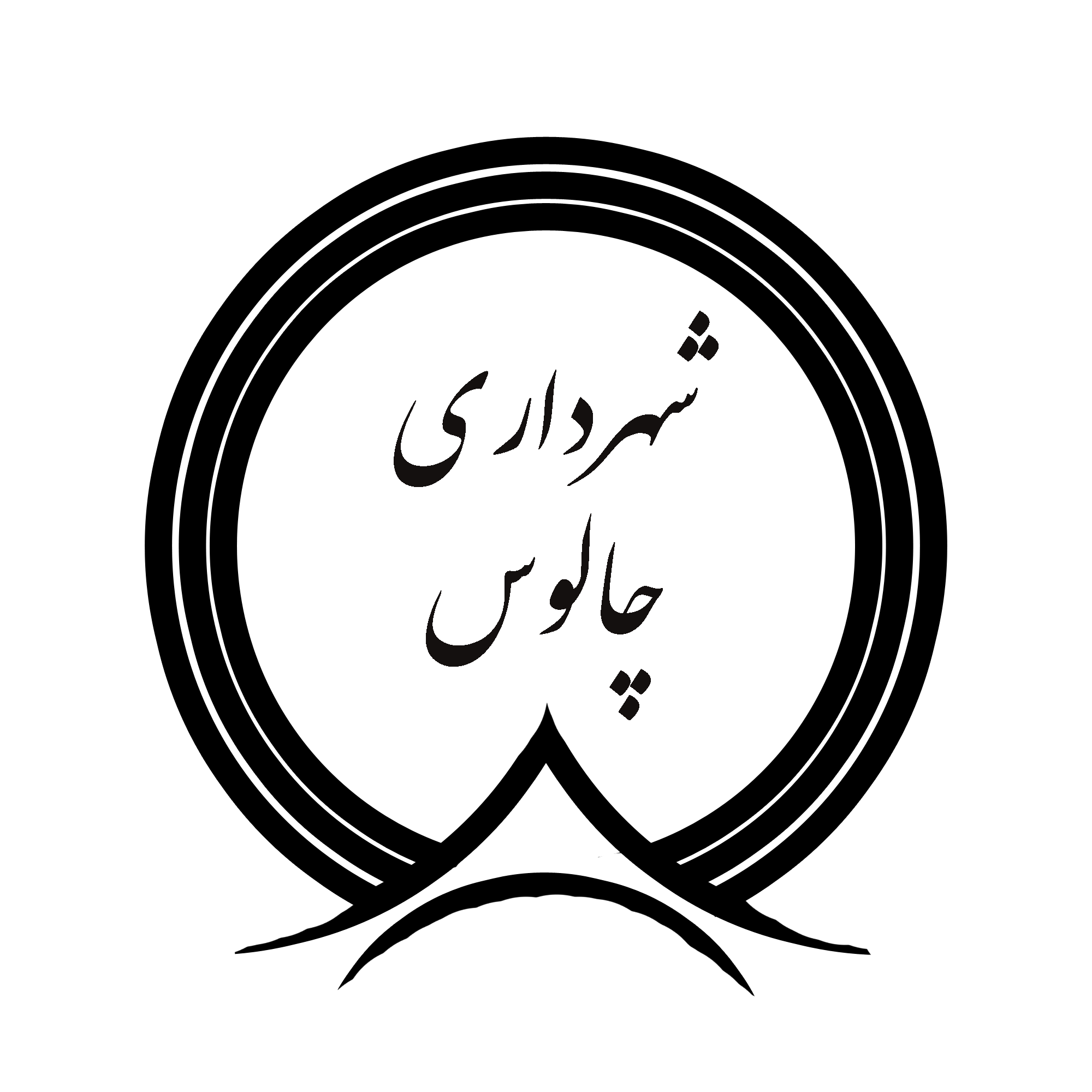
- Seal

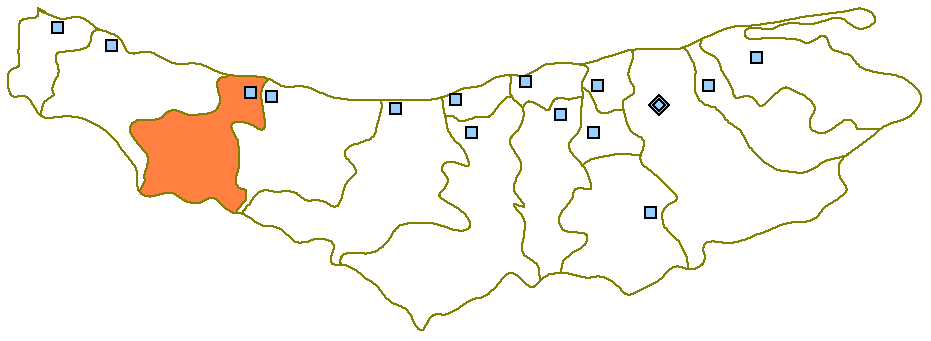

- Location within Iran
- Coordinates: 36°39′17″N 51°25′16″E
- Country: Iran
- Province: Mazandaran
- County: Chalus
- District: Central

Government
  - Type: Mayor, City Council
  - Mayor: Mahdi Tavakkoli
  - Representative in Majles: Mohammad Ali Mohseni Bandpey

Population (2016)
  - Total: 65,196
- Time zone: UTC+3:30 (IRST)
- Website: chalus.ir

Chalus (Persian: چالوس) (Note: Also romanized as Čâlus, Chaloos, Chalous, Chalousse, and Chālūs; Mazandarani: romanized as Chālus) is a city in the Central District of Chalus County, Mazandaran province, Iran, serving as capital of both the county and the district.

== History ==
In the past and under Arabic influence, Chalus was called "Salus" or "Shalus". It has a long history of rebellions and clashes with regional rulers or occupying foreign forces. Chalus used to have a large silk factory that was active from 1936 to 1958, and exported fabrics and other silk products to different countries.

Chalus is part of the Kelarestaq area of Ruyan (Tabaristan). Ruyan was an ancient land in the west of Mazandaran province during the Baduspanids era. This land includes Kojur, Kelarestaq and Tonekabon. The city of Kojur was the centre of the land of the Ruyans. Ruyan has always been part of the Tabaristan, nowadays called Mazandaran province. The Ruyan was also called the Rostamdār, Ostandār, and Rostamdele.

== Demographics ==
=== Language ===
The people residing in Chalus speak the western dialect of Mazandarani. In the west of Chalus, the Kalarestaqi dialect is spoken, and in the east of Chalus, people speak in the Kojuri dialect.

Mazandarani people have a background in Tabari ethnicity and speak Mazandarani. Their origin goes back to the Tapuri people. Their land was called Tapuria, the land of Tapuris. Tapuris were made to migrate to the south coast of the Caspian Sea during the Achaemenid dynasty.

The native people of Sari, Babol, Amol, Nowshahr, Chalus, and Tonekabon are Mazandarani people and speak Mazandarani.

Eastern Mazani is spoken in the entire valley of the Chalus River, though some Kurdish tribes were established in the villages of Kojur and Kelardasht during the Qajar period.

=== Population ===
At the time of the 2006 National Census, the city's population was 44,618 in 12,791 households. The following census in 2011 counted 47,881 people in 15,077 households. The 2016 census measured the population of the city as 65,196 people in 22,166 households.

=== Geography ===
The city is in Mazandaran province of northern Iran. The bordering counties are Nowshahr to the east, Tonekabon to the west (in Mazandaran province) and Tehran province to the south. It sits on the Chalus River by the Caspian Sea.

=== Climate ===
Chalus has a humid subtropical climate (Köppen: Cfa, Trewartha: Cf), with warm, humid summers and cool, damp winters.

== Tourism ==
Chalus is a major vacation destination for Iranians during holidays for its nice weather and natural attractions. One of the great attractions of Chalus is the mountainous road leading to Chalus, widely known as Chalus Road. This city has a reputation for a number of villages, one of which is called Namakab Rud. This town offers a variety of different entertaining activities, such as a cable car, offering a view of the surrounding mountains.

Gole Sorkhi, Mohavateh Kaakh (The Palace), Chalus Mahalleh, Radio Darya, Dahgiri, Sheykh Ghotb are among the most notable neighborhoods of Chalus.

The Taliesin Associated Architects (Frank Lloyd Wright Foundation) had three buildings built in Iran, one of which was the summer residence of Shams Pahlavi known as Mehrafarin Palace in Chalus (occupied by the local police as of 2004).

== See also ==
- Padishkhwargar
- Kandolus
