= Central District (Chalus County) =

District in Mazandaran province, Iran

Central District (Chalus County) Persian: بخش مرکزی شهرستان چالوس
- District
- Location within Iran
- Coordinates: 36°36′N 51°22′E
- Country: Iran
- Province: Mazandaran
- County: Chalus
- Established: 1996
- Capital: Chalus

Population (2016)
  - Total: 96,224
- Time zone: UTC+3:30 (IRST)

The Central District of Chalus County (Persian: بخش مرکزی شهرستان چالوس) is in Mazandaran province, Iran. Its capital is the city of Chalus.

== History ==
The village of Hachirud merged with other villages to become a city in 2010.

== Demographics ==
=== Population ===
At the time of the 2006 National Census, the district's population was 83,101 in 23,101 households. The following census in 2011 counted 88,216 people in 27,345 households. The 2016 census measured the population of the district as 96,224 inhabitants in 32,362 households.

=== Administrative divisions ===
Central District (Chalus County) Population
Administrative Divisions	2006	2011	2016
Kelarestaq-e Gharbi RD	13,953	13,798	4,854
Kelarestaq-e Sharqi RD	24,530	26,537	15,776
Chalus (city)	44,618	47,881	65,196
Hachirud (city)			10,398
Total	83,101	88,216	96,224
RD = Rural District
