= Tashkuh =

Tashkuh (Persian: تاشكوه) may refer to:

- Tashkuh (mountain), in Khuzestan Province
- Tashkuh-e Olya, Mazandaran Province
- Tashkuh-e Sofla, Mazandaran Province
- Tashkuh-e Vosta, Mazandaran Province
