= Kardgar Kola =

Kardgar Kola (Persian: كاردگركلا) may refer to:

- Kardgar Kola, Babol
- Kardgar Kola, Nur
