= Galand Rud =

Galand Rud گلندرود
- Village
- Location within Iran
- Coordinates: 36°26′44″N 51°54′26″E
- Country: Iran
- Province: Mazandaran
- County: Nur
- Bakhsh: Central
- Rural District: Mian Band

Population (2016)
  - Total: 150
- Time zone: UTC+3:30 (IRST)

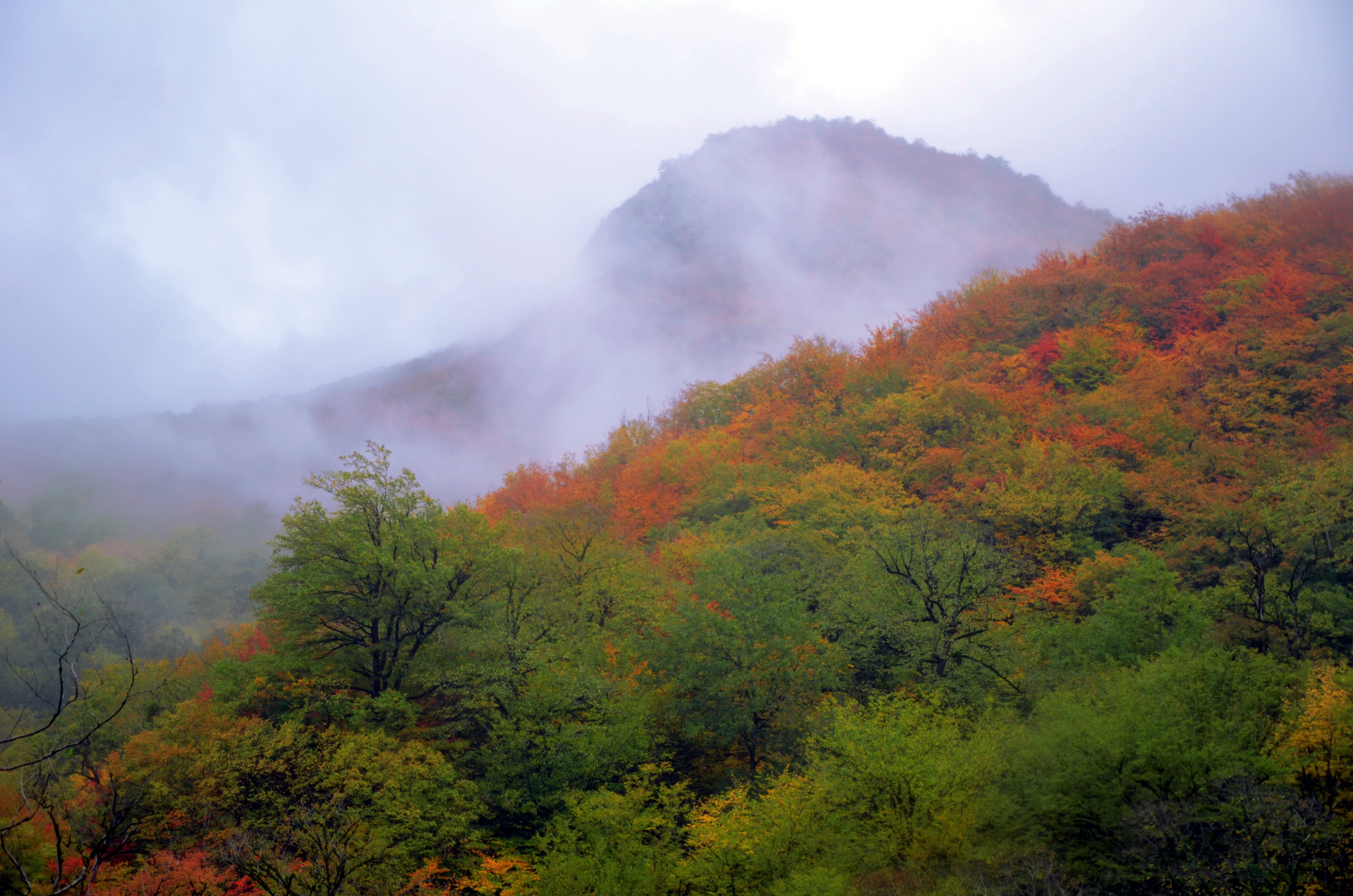
Forests near Galandrud

Galand Rud (Persian: گلندرود, also Romanized as Galand Rūd; also known as Galanrūd) is a village in Mian Band Rural District, in the Central District of Nur County, Mazandaran Province, Iran.

At the time of the 2006 National Census, the village's population was 57 in 18 households. The following census in 2011 counted 104 people in 35 households. The 2016 census measured the population of the village as 160 people in 52 households.
