= Peymot =

Peymot پيمط
- Village
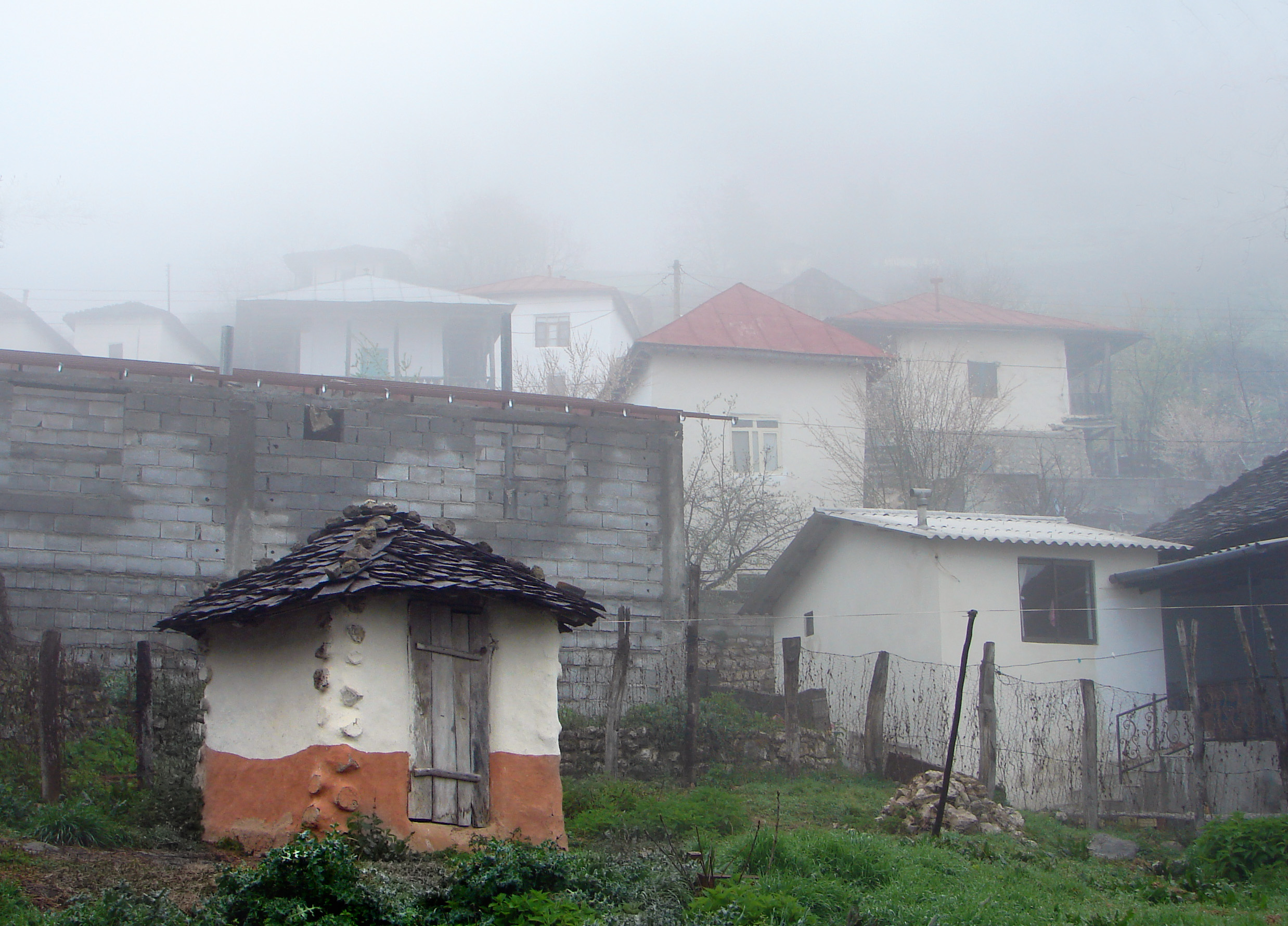

- Location within Iran
- Coordinates: 36°27′08″N 51°53′30″E
- Country: Iran
- Province: Mazandaran
- County: Nur
- Bakhsh: Central
- Rural District: Mian Band

Population (2016)
  - Total: 427
- Time zone: UTC+3:30 (IRST)

Peymot (Persian: پيمط, also Romanized as Peymoţ; also known as Peymod and Peymowd) is a village in Mian Band Rural District, in the Central District of Nur County, Mazandaran Province, Iran. At the 2016 census, its population was 427, in 154 families. Large increase from 84 people in 2006.
