= Lazir =

Lazir may refer to:

- Ləzir, Azerbaijan
- Lazir, Mandaran, Iran
- Lazir, Tehran, Iran
- Lazir, daikundi, afghanistan
