= Pas Peres =

Pas Peres پس پرس
- Village
- Location within Iran
- Coordinates: 36°22′38″N 51°51′52″E
- Country: Iran
- Province: Mazandaran
- County: Nur
- Bakhsh: Central
- Rural District: Mian Band

Population (2006)
  - Total: 107
- Time zone: UTC+3:30 (IRST)
  - Summer (DST): UTC+4:30 (IRDT)

Pas Peres (Persian: پس پرس, also Romanized as Pesperes) is a village in Mian Band Rural District, in the Central District of Nur County, Mazandaran Province, Iran. At the 2006 census, its population was 107, in 24 families.
