= Natel Kenar =

Natel Kenar (Persian: ناتل كنار) may refer to:

- Natel Kenar-e Olya Rural District
- Natel Kenar-e Sofla Rural District
