= List of multilingual countries and regions =

This is an incomplete list of areas with either multilingualism at the community level or at the personal level.

There is a distinction between social and personal bilingualism. Many countries, such as Belarus, Belgium, Canada, Finland, India, Ireland, South Africa and Switzerland, which are officially multilingual, may have many monolinguals in their population (Canada exemplifies this situation, as it is a country in which western provinces are predominantly anglophone while the province of Quebec, along with the bilingual New Brunswick, emphasize French prominence in the eastern side). Officially monolingual countries, on the other hand, such as France, can have sizable multilingual populations. Some countries have official languages but also have regional and local official languages, notably Brazil, China, Indonesia, Mexico, Philippines, Russia, Spain and Taiwan.

== Africa ==
=== Central Africa ===
- Cameroon: French and English (both official), as well as Cameroonian Pidgin. Many ethnic and tribal languages including Basaa, Duala, Manenguba, Bikya, Bung, Fula, Kanuri, Ngumba, Yeni, Bamum, Bafia, Bakweri language and many others. Some also have fluency in the German, Portuguese and Spanish languages.
- Central African Republic: French & Sango (both official) and 50 other African languages.
- Chad: French and Arabic (both official) + more than 100 African languages.
- Democratic Republic of the Congo: French (official) + Lingala, Kongo, Swahili & Tshiluba (national languages) + 238 other languages.
- Republic of the Congo: French (official), Lingala and Kituba national languages plus other dialects, including Kikongo and Kituba.
- Equatorial Guinea: Spanish, French and Portuguese are the official languages of the country. Fang, Bube, Igbo, Pidgin English, Annobonese are also spoken.
- Gabon: French (official and regional), English, Spanish, Portuguese, Fang, Mbere, Myene, Njebi, Punu, Teke, Vili (regional languages) as well as other languages.
- São Tomé and Principe: Portuguese (official), Forro Creole, Angolar Creole, Principense Creole (recognized creole languages) as well as other languages.

=== East Africa ===
- Burundi: Kirundi (national and official), French and English (both official).
- Kenya: English (official), Swahili (national and official) and 100+ other languages (Bantu, Nilotes, Cushites, Indians).
- Rwanda: Kinyarwanda, English, French and Swahili are all official languages. Kinyarwanda is the national language. English is the medium of instruction and the primary language of government and business.
- Seychelles: French, English & Seychellois Creole are official.
- Tanzania: Swahili is the national language and English and many other indigenous languages. Swahili and English are de facto official languages and Arabic is spoken in Zanzibar.
- Uganda: English (official), Swahili (second official), Arabic, Luganda, other Bantu and. Nilo-Saharan languages.

=== Horn of Africa ===
- Djibouti: French and Arabic (official) plus Somali (official) & Afar.
- Eritrea: Tigrinya, Arabic and English are predominantly used in commerce and government affairs. The use and development of nine Eritrean languages (Tigrinya, Bilen, Afar, Saho, Rashaida, Tigre, Kunama, Nara and Hidarib) is encouraged at the local level and children attend primary school through the fifth grade in their mother tongue. Italian is an additional language spoken in commerce.
- Ethiopia: The federal working language is Amharic. At a regional level, working languages are Tigrigna in Tigray, Afarigna in Afar, Afaan Oromoo in Oromia, Somali in Somali region, and Harari in Harari region.
- Somalia: Somali (official) and Arabic ("second language" official). plus English and Italian (foreign languages).

=== North Africa ===
- Algeria: Arabic and Amazigh (both official and national language in the constitution) plus Algerian Arabic and French (in media, education and business).
- Egypt: Arabic (official), Coptic, Egyptian Arabic, English and French.
- Libya: Arabic (official), Amazigh, Tamahaq, Italian and English.
- Mauritania: Arabic (official and national), French, Poular, Soninke, and Wolof (national).
- Morocco: Arabic and Amazigh (co-official). Moroccan Arabic, Hassaniya (present in the media), French (its wide use in education is legally established), Spanish.
  - Western Sahara (under Moroccan control): Hassaniya, Berber, Moroccan Arabic, Spanish and French.
  - Sahrawi Arab Democratic Republic (in exile): Arabic (official) and Spanish (official) and French.
- Sudan: Arabic and English (official working languages) plus indigenous African languages.
- South Sudan: Arabic, English and other indigenous languages.
- Tunisia: Modern Standard Arabic (official), Tunisian Arabic, French, Berber language, and English language.

=== Southern Africa ===
- Angola: Portuguese (official language), Cokwe, Kikongo, Oshiwambo, Umbundu, Kimbundu and 32 additional indigenous African languages
- Botswana: English, Tswana, Kalanga, Khoi, Herero, Afrikaans, Nama, San, Ndebele, Sign language, and 21 others.
- Comoros: Comorian, French (official) and Arabic.
- Eswatini (Swaziland): English and Swati.
- Lesotho: English and Sotho.
- Madagascar: French and Malagasy.
- Malawi: Chewa (de facto language of national identity) and English (statutory national working language). Both are official.
- Mauritius: English (official, national), French (administrative, national), Mauritian Creole (lingua franca), Hindi, Mandarin, Tamil, Telugu, Hakka, Urdu, Marathi, Bhojpuri and Arabic.
- Mozambique: Portuguese (official language) and 43 additional indigenous African languages
- Namibia: English (official), German, Afrikaans, and Ovambo (recognised regional languages)
- South Africa: Afrikaans, English, Ndebele, Northern Sotho, Sotho, Swazi, Tswana, Tsonga, Venda, Xhosa, Zulu (co-official), sign language, Khoi, Nama and San (the languages, which the government is obliged to promote and to create conditions for their development).
- Zambia: English (official), Bemba, Nyanja, Tonga, Lozi, Lunda, Kaonde, Luvale, Ila, Mambwe, Namwanga, Tumbuka, Aushi, Lenje, Lala and Lamba, and 57 others (72 in total).
- Zimbabwe: Chewa, Chibarwe, English, Kalanga, Koisan, Nambya, Ndau, Ndebele, Shangani, Shona, sign language, Sotho, Tonga, Tswana, Venda and Xhosa (officially recognised).

=== West Africa ===
- Benin: French (official) and many indigenous languages including Fon, Yoruba & Songhay (specifically Dendi).
- Burkina Faso: French (official), Moore and Jula (regional languages) and indigenous Sudanic languages.
- Cape Verde: Portuguese and Cape Verdean Creole.
- Gambia: English (official), Mandinka, Wolof, Fula and others.
- Ghana: English (official), Akan, Dagaare/Wale, Dagbane, Dangme, Ewe, Ga, Gonja, Kasem, Nzema and 70 others.
- Guinea: French (official), Maninka, Fula and Susu.
- Guinea-Bissau: Portuguese (official), Kriol and indigenous languages.
- Ivory Coast: French (official), Baule, Jula, and 60 other indigenous languages.
- Liberia: English (official) and 20 African languages.
- Mali: French (official), Bambara (most widely spoken), Fula and Songhay (specifically Dendi). 11 languages are used as mediums of instruction in primary schools
- Mauritania: Arabic (official and recognized national language), Pulaar, Soninke, Wolof, Zenaga (recognized national languages) as well as other languages.
- Niger: French (official) plus ten other languages recognised as national ones, including Hausa (spoken by half the population) and Songhay (specifically Zarma)
- Nigeria: English (official), Yoruba, Hausa and Igbo are the four languages of the parliament (each of which has over 20 million speakers) plus 529 other African languages (some of which have over a million speakers) and Nigerian Pidgin.
- Senegal: French (official), Wolof (widely spoken), Fula (specifically Pulaar), Diola, Malinké, Sérère, Soninké (national languages) plus other African languages
- Sierra Leone: English (official), Krio (most widely spoken), Mende, Temne and other African languages
- Togo: French (official), Ewe, Mina and Kabiyé.

== Americas ==
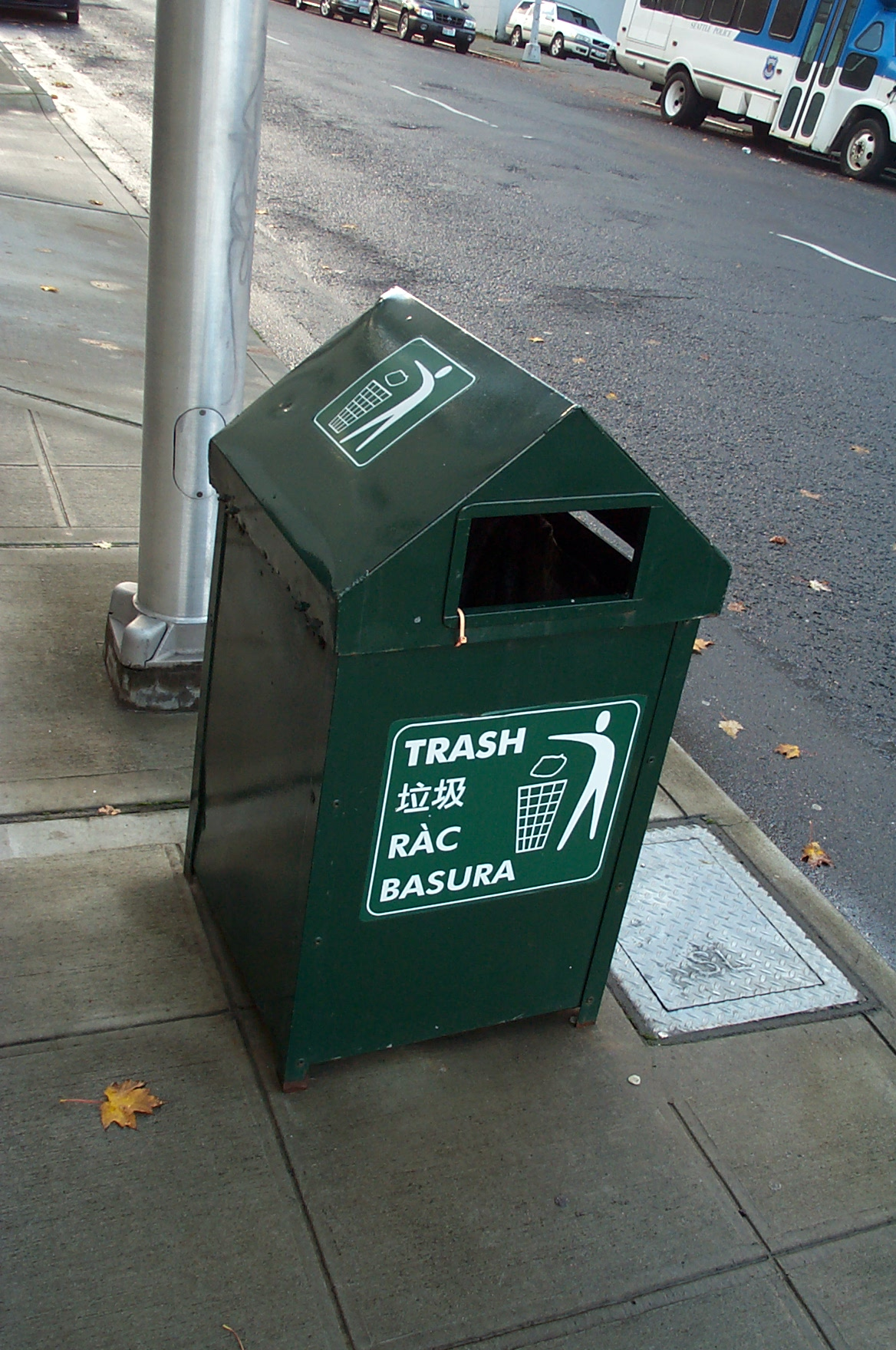
A trash can in Seattle labeled in four languages: English, Chinese (垃圾), Vietnamese (should be rác), and Spanish. The word basura is also present in the Tagalog language

=== Caribbean ===
- Antigua and Barbuda: No official language at national or local level. Antiguan and Barbudan Creole and English both spoken by majority of the population. Guyanese Creole and Jamaican Patois spoken by over 5% of the population each. Bilingual government services are often provided in Spanish.
- Aruba: Papiamento and Dutch are the official languages, with Spanish and English also widely spoken. All four languages are taught in schools.
- Caribbean Netherlands – Dutch (overall), English (Sint Eustatius and Saba) and Papiamentu (Bonaire).
- Curaçao – Papiamento, Dutch and English are official languages. Spanish is also widely spoken.
- Haiti: Creole and French
- Jamaica: English and Jamaican Patois
- Puerto Rico's official languages and languages of legislature are Spanish and English, yet 85 percent of its inhabitants reported that they did not speak English "very well."
- Saint Lucia: English and Saint Lucian French Creole
- Trinidad and Tobago – in the predominantly Trinidadian English Creole-speaking country where Trinidadian English is official, Spanish was introduced as the second language of bilingual traffic signs and is spoken among 5% of the population fluently. and is generally the "first foreign language". Trinidadian Hindustani is rarely used, only spoken among Indo Trinidadian families, mostly the elders who preserve their ancestral language. Sanskrit/Hindi is also used when singing songs of East Indian origins and in the Hindu Temples. Trinidadian French Creole (Patois) is widely spoken in the communities of the northern suburbs of Port of Spain such as Maraval and Paramin, where there are descendants of the early French Immigrants to Trinidad.

=== Central America ===
- Belize: English, Spanish and Mayan languages have some official usage, although the legacy of British rule emphasised English to be most commonly used for official purposes though the majority are Hispanophone.
- Dominican Republic: Spanish (official) as well as other languages.
- Guatemala has one official language which is Spanish; however, there are 22 distinct Mayan languages. Maya, Garifuna and Xincan languages are recognized to be essential elements of the national identity.
- Honduras: Spanish is the official language, despite Afro-Caribbean English, Garifuna and indigenous languages can be found in the rural outskirts of the country.
- In Nicaragua, even while Spanish is the official language (spoken by almost 95%, according to some sources), there are other de facto languages such as Creole, English, Miskitu, Rama and Mayangna (Sumu) in their own linguistic communities. According to the Constitution, the languages of the Atlantic Coasts should be used officially in cases established by law.
- In Panama, Spanish is the official language, and seven indigenous languages have been given official recognition

=== North America ===
- Canada is officially bilingual under the Official Languages Act and the Constitution of Canada that require the federal government to deliver services in both official languages: English and French. As well, minority language rights are guaranteed where numbers warrant. 56.9% of the population speak English as their first language while 22.9% are native speakers of French. The remaining population belong to some of Canada's many immigrant populations or to the indigenous population. See Bilingualism in Canada
  - Alberta has a specific French policy since 2017.
  - The Canadian province of British Columbia has a sizable population that speaks Mandarin or Cantonese, particularly in the city of Vancouver and its satellite town of Richmond. There is a provincial law on First Nations languages.
  - The Canadian province of New Brunswick, with a large Acadian population (33% French-speaking) is officially bilingual.
  - The Canadian province of Quebec, (7.9% English-speaking) Note: Quebec's largest city, Montreal, is a multilingual city with half the population having French as their mother tongue, and the other half having other languages (including English) as their mother tongue (see Language demographics of Quebec). A majority of Montrealers, whether they call themselves francophone, anglophone or allophone, know both French and English. The city's McGill University, an English-language institution, allows students to submit essays or tests in either English or French. Although there is a sizable English-speaking population in Quebec, French is the only official language of the provincial government. At the same time, many services are provided in English, such as health services, education, legislative activities and judiciary services. Many government services are available in English and French. In the Kahnawake reserve, Mohawk is the official language.
  - Manitoba has a particular French Language Services Policy and bilingual in capital city Winnipeg, as well as a special law on recognition of seven indigenous languages.
  - Nova Scotia has a governmental agency for Scots Gaelic language and culture affairs. French is regionally spoken, with a special law on French-language services.
  - In Newfoundland and Labrador, in the autonomous area of Nunatsiavut, English and Inuttut are co-official There is also a particular provincial French Language Services Policy In Port au Port Peninsula French language is used as well.
  - Nunavut is a Canadian territory with a population that is 85% Inuit. According to Official Languages Act, its official languages are Inuit, English and French.
  - Northwest Territories have Chipewyan, Cree, English, French, Gwich’in, Inuinnaqtun, Inuktitut, Inuvialuktun, North Slavey, South Slavey and Tłı̨chǫ Yatıì as the official languages.
  - Ontario delivers services under the French Language Services Act.
  - In Prince Edward Island, there is a Francophone region.
  - Saskatchewan has a particular French-language Services Policy.
  - Yukon allows the use of Yukon languages in its legislative assembly, along with French and English.
  - In the 2006 Canadian census, information and questions are available in sixty-two languages, including eighteen First Nations languages.
  - The city of Toronto is one of the most multilingual cities in the world. It is the home to over a dozen daily media outlets of different languages, including the Italian daily Corriere Canadese and the Chinese daily Sing Tao.
- Greenland: Greenlandic is the official language. Danish and English are spoken and taught; and all Greenlanders are Danish-Greenlandic bilinguals.
- Mexico: The government recognizes 62 indigenous languages, including Nahuatl, spoken by more than 1.5 million people and Aguacatec spoken by 27 people, along with Spanish. Indigenous languages are recognised as national languages in areas where they are spoken. There is no official language at the federal level, although Spanish is the de facto state language.
  - In Guerrero, state constitution provides for use of indigenous languages in education and translating of main provincial laws to these languages.
  - In Yucatán, Yucatec Maya language is recognised in the state constitution.
  - In Oaxaca state constitution, 15 indigenous communities are listed. Certain use of their languages in education and court proceedings is provided for.
  - In Puebla state constitution, use of indigenous languages in courts and education is provided for
  - In Campeche state constitution, use of indigenous languages in courts and teaching them in schools are provided for.
  - In Quintana Roo state constitution, use of indigenous languages in courts and education is provided for; also, the laws are to be published in Maya language.
  - In Chihuahua state constitution, use of indigenous languages in courts, education, health care and government-disseminated information is provided for.
  - In Chiapas state constitution, use of indigenous languages in courts and education is provided for.
- In the United States, at the federal level, there is no official language, although there have been efforts to make English the official language. Use of several languages in electoral process under certain circumstances is provided for by federal law, including Spanish in the whole states of Florida, California and Texas. There are federal statutes promoting Native American languages: Native American Languages Act of 1990 and Esther Martinez Native American Languages Preservation Act.
  - The US state of California has the Dymally-Alatorre Bilingual Services Act. requiring state and local agencies serving a "substantial number of non-English speaking people" to employ a "qualified bilingual staff" and to translate certain documents into clients' languages.
  - The US state of New Mexico provides certain guarantees for the use of Spanish, alongside English, in its constitution and electoral laws. Its state laws also provide for using Spanish and Native American languages in education
  - The US state of New York provides translation of vital documents and interpretation into six languages alongside English.
  - The US state of South Dakota recognises the Sioux language as the official indigenous language of the state.
  - The US state of Texas provides in its law for translating to Spanish certain information on agency websites.
  - The US state of Louisiana has mandated the Louisiana French Language Services Program and the Department of Culture, Recreation and Tourism to work on providing state government services in French, to the extent practicable It also expressly allows the use of French in legal process and publishing official documents. Spanish is also spoken.
  - The Saint John River valley in the US state of Maine and some areas in Vermont are unofficially bilingual (de facto) in English and French.
  - The US state of Hawaii is officially bilingual in English and Hawaiian.
  - The US state of Alaska officially recognizes English and the following twenty Alaska Native languages: Inupiaq, Siberian Yupik, Central Alaskan Yup'ik, Alutiiq, Unanga, Dena'ina, Deg Xinag, Holikachuk, Koyukon, Upper Kuskokwim, Gwich'in, Tanana, Upper Tanana, Tanacross, Hän, Ahtna, Eyak, Tlingit, Haida, Tsimshian languages. Russian is spoken.
  - Three US territories are also bilingual: American Samoa (Samoan and English), and Puerto Rico (Spanish and English). Guam Code provides for bilingual education (English and Chamorro). One US territory is trilingual: Northern Marianas Islands (English, Chamorro, and Carolinian).
  - In US, states with a large historic (New Spain and First Mexican Empire) and recently arrived Spanish-speaking population such as California, Nevada, Arizona, Colorado, New Mexico, Texas and Florida will often provide government services at the municipal level in Spanish as well as English. For example, in Florida, Hialeah recognizes both English and Spanish while Miami recognizes English and Spanish as official government languages.
  - Hopi Tribe constitution (Arizona) provides for specific requirements for Hopi language skills for officials
  - German is spoken due to Amish, German, Austrian and Swiss people. In Pennsylvania, the Pennsylvania Dutch dialect is spoken.

=== South America ===
- Argentina has several ethnic communities of European, Asian and indigenous origins (the Andean and northeast regions), who speak their own languages, but uses de facto Spanish as the official language of the country. In most of the country, there is a sizable but bilingual Italian-speaking population.
  - Chaco Province recognises Qom, Moqoit y Wichi as official languages of the province along with Spanish
  - Corrientes Province Guarani is recognised as the second official language
  - Santiago del Estero Province gives official recognition to Quechua in its constitution
- Bolivia is officially multilingual, supporting Spanish and 36 native languages.
- Brazil, Portuguese (official) and upwards to 100 languages spoken mainly in the urban areas (European and Asian) and indigenous languages in the Amazon. The use of indigenous languages in primary education is enshrined in the constitution.
  - Espírito Santo – German and East Pomeranian are recognized by constitution as part of the state's cultural heritage
  - Rio de Janeiro – Yoruba, Bantu and Jeje (African Languages) are recognized by constitution as part of the state's cultural heritage
  - Rio Grande do Sul – Talian (Italian dialect) and Riograndense Hünsrick (German dialect) are recognized by constitution as part of the state's cultural heritage
  - Santa Catarina – Talian are recognized by constitution as part of the state's cultural heritage
- Chile uses de facto Spanish as official language, but there are not an act that declares officiality. The Indigenous Act ratified in 1992 permites the official usage of four indigenous languages: Aimara, Mapudungun, Quechua and Rapa Nui (Easter Island in Polynesia) inside the indigenous communities and areas with high native population density. In the southern portion, there is a sizable but bilingual German-speaking population.
- Colombia The official language is Spanish. Languages of ethnic groups are official in their territories.
  English is co-official in San Andres and Providencia.
- Ecuador defines Spanish as its official language, but Spanish, Quechua and Shuar – as official languages of intercultural relations in the Article 2 of the 2008 Constitution.
- Falkland Islands, English is the official & dominant language. Spanish is spoken by a minority of the population who comes from Chile and Argentina.
- Guyana, English (official), Guyanese Hindustani (now mostly used among elders only from Indo-Guyanese community), Chinese, indigenous languages, and a small Portuguese-speaking community. The Amerindian Act orders the National Toshaos Council to promote the recognition and use of Amerindian languages.
- Paraguay, More than 46% of its population is bilingual in Guaraní and Spanish (both official languages of the Republic), of whom 37% speak only Guaraní and 8% only Spanish but the latter increases with the use of Jopará. There is a large Mennonite German colony in the Gran Chaco region as well.
- Peru's official languages are Spanish and, in the zones where they are predominant, Quechua, Aymara, and other aboriginal languages. In addition to that, in Peru there is a large community of immigrants, of which few keep their languages. Within those, there are the Japanese and the Chinese (Cantonese dialect), for example and in smaller numbers, the Germans (central Andes), Italian, the Arabic speakers, and the Urdu speakers retain their native languages in Peru. The last two are products of the recent wave of immigrants from Palestine and Pakistan. Lately English has been used by American and British residents.
- In Suriname, Dutch, Sranan, and English are spoken by large segments of the population (as the national, de facto working language, and common educational language, respectively). In addition, Chinese, Javanese, and various Indian languages, such as Hindustani, are spoken as well.
- Uruguay has a large Italian-speaking minority also proficient in Spanish. Its border with Brazil has a mixed Portuguese-speaking presence.
- Venezuela has declared Spanish the official language, while there are some European and Arabic languages spoken in urban areas, Caribbean English dialects in the Caribbean and indigenous languages spoken in the Guayana department. The prominent additional European languages spoken are Italian and German. The use of native languages also has official status for native peoples.

== Asia ==
=== Central Asia ===
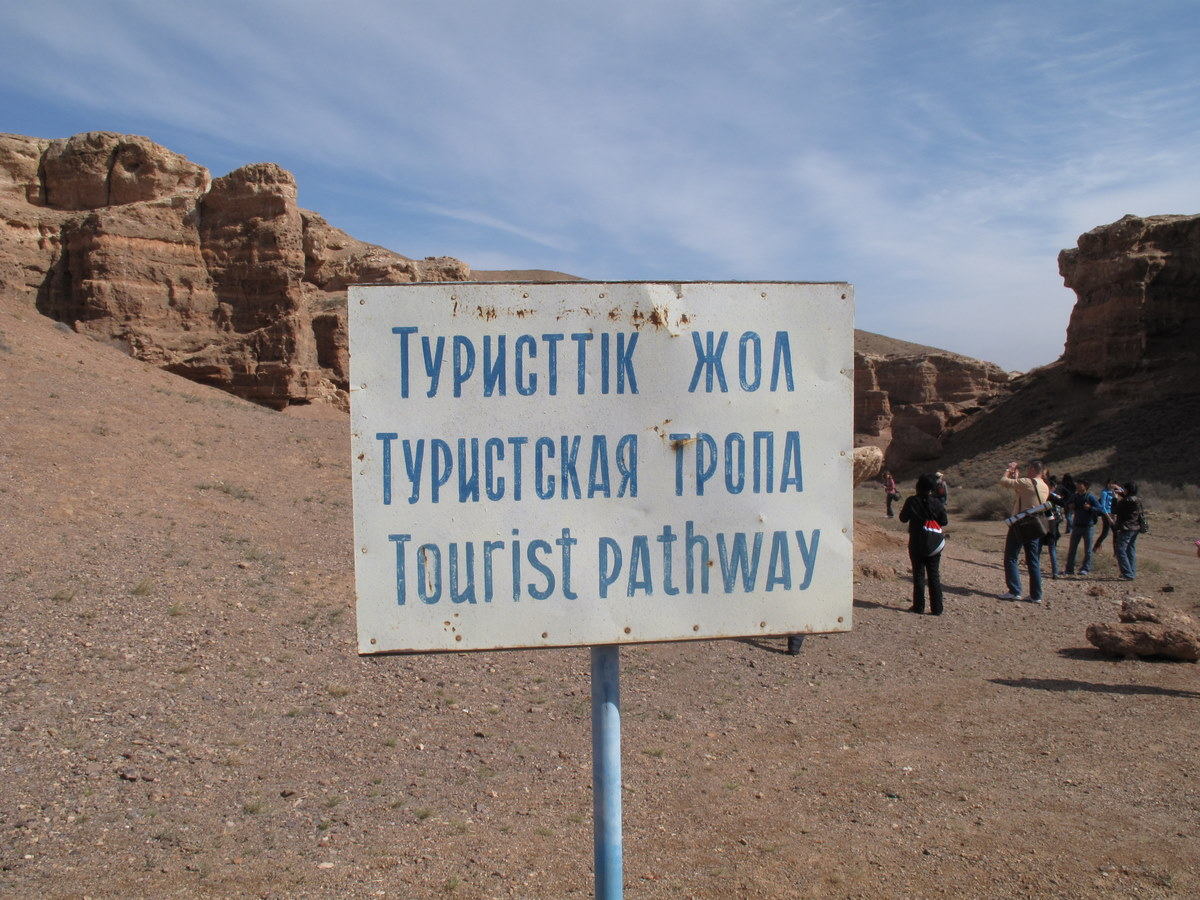
A sign in the Charyn Canyon indicating a tourist trail written in Kazakh, Russian and English.

- Kazakhstan: Kazakh and Russian both have official status—Kazakh as the "state" language and Russian as "officially used on equal grounds along with the Kazakh language". Kazakhstan is taking its huge step into multilingualism by accepting the trilingualism policy and making changes in law. Former president Nursultan Nazarbaev noted that "The multinationality and multilingualism are one of the values and the main feature of our state. "Dariga Nazarbayeva, then deputy prime minister and daughter of the then president, said in February 2016 that Kazakh children should learn Chinese in addition to Kazakh, Russian and English. “China is our friend, our trading partner and the biggest investor in the economy of our country", she said. "In the near future, we all need to know Chinese.”
- Kyrgyzstan: Kyrgyz is the state language and Russian "used in the capacity of an official language".
- Tajikistan: Tajik as the state language and Russian, designated as language of interethnic communication in the constitution, are widely spoken.
- Uzbekistan: In Uzbekistan, Uzbek (official), Tajik, and Russian are all widely spoken. Use of Russian (alongside Uzbek) is foreseen for notarized documents and civic records
  - Karakalpakstan: In Karakalpakstan, Karakalpak is an official one, alongside Uzbek.

=== East Asia ===
- In Mainland China, Standard Mandarin (Putonghua) is the official language and is spoken in all regions. It is used for official and formal purposes, by the media, and in education as the language of instruction. However, on money notes, there are texts both in Mandarin (Han) and in Mongolian, Tibetan, Uyghur, and Zhuang. In every locality and region, local varieties of Chinese are spoken in daily life. These range from being quite similar to Putonghua, such as Tianjin dialect, to those that are mutually unintelligible with Putonghua such as Jiangsu, Zhejiang and Shanghai dialect (Wu) or Guangzhou dialect (Cantonese). In the autonomous regions, minority languages are used (such as Tibetan in Tibet or Mongolian in Inner Mongolia, Uyghur, Kazakh and others in Xinjiang).
- Japan: a special law provides for promotion of Ainu in Hokkaido
- Taiwan: A national language in Taiwan is legally defined as "a natural language used by an original people group of Taiwan and the Taiwan Sign Language". This includes Formosan languages, Hakka, Mandarin and Taiwanese.
- In Hong Kong, English and Chinese are official languages. All road signs are written in both languages. English is the dominant language in the judiciary and in higher education. Hong Kong Cantonese is the first language of the majority of the population, and is the dominant language in many aspects of everyday life. While Cantonese is the widely spoken form of Chinese in Hong Kong, Standard Mandarin is also taught in schools. The degrees of proficiency in English and Mandarin vary from person to person.
- In Macau, both Chinese and Portuguese are official languages. While Cantonese is the dominant form of Chinese, Standard Mandarin (Putonghua) is also spoken. Chinese is taught in all schools, while Portuguese is mainly taught in government schools. In addition, English is also taught in many schools. Macanese Patois, a local Portuguese-based creole generally known as Patuá, is now spoken only by a few older Eurasian population.

=== North Asia ===
- Russia holds a List of minor indigenous peoples of Russia. This list currently mentions 50 peoples (40 until an amendment in 2015), and the "Law on the guarantees of the rights of the minor indigenous peoples of Russia" guarantees among other Federal programmes for the protection and development of their languages and cultures (article 5). The article 10 of the same law guarantees to people belonging to these peoples the right to preserve and develop their native language, and the right to receive and broadcast information in their native languages and to create media.
- Several Republics of Russia make locally official the language of the main people(s) of those Republics:
  - Buryatia – Russian and Buryat are co-official
  - Altai Republic – Russian and Altai are co-official
  - Tuva – Russian and Tuvan are co-official
  - Khakassia – Russian and Khakas are co-official
  - Sakha Republic – Russian and Sakha are co-official. The law "about the languages of the Sakha Republic" mentions in its article 6 that Evenki, Even, Yukagir, Dolgan, Chukchi languages are recognized as official in the places where those peoples live and are used as equal as the national languages. The Sakha Republic guarantees protection and care for the preservation and the free development of those languages. It is worth noting, however, that Chukchi has no official status in the neighbouring Chukotka. It is closely related to Koryak which is official in the North of Kamchatka (see below).
- Administrative-territorial units with special status (formerly Federal subjects of Russia, downgraded in 2007–2008):
  - Ust-Orda Buryat Okrug (Irkutsk Oblast) and Agin-Buryat Okrug (Zabaykalsky Krai): Buryat is co-official with Russian.
  - Koryak Okrug (Kamchatka Krai): Koryak is co-official with Russian.

=== South Asia ===
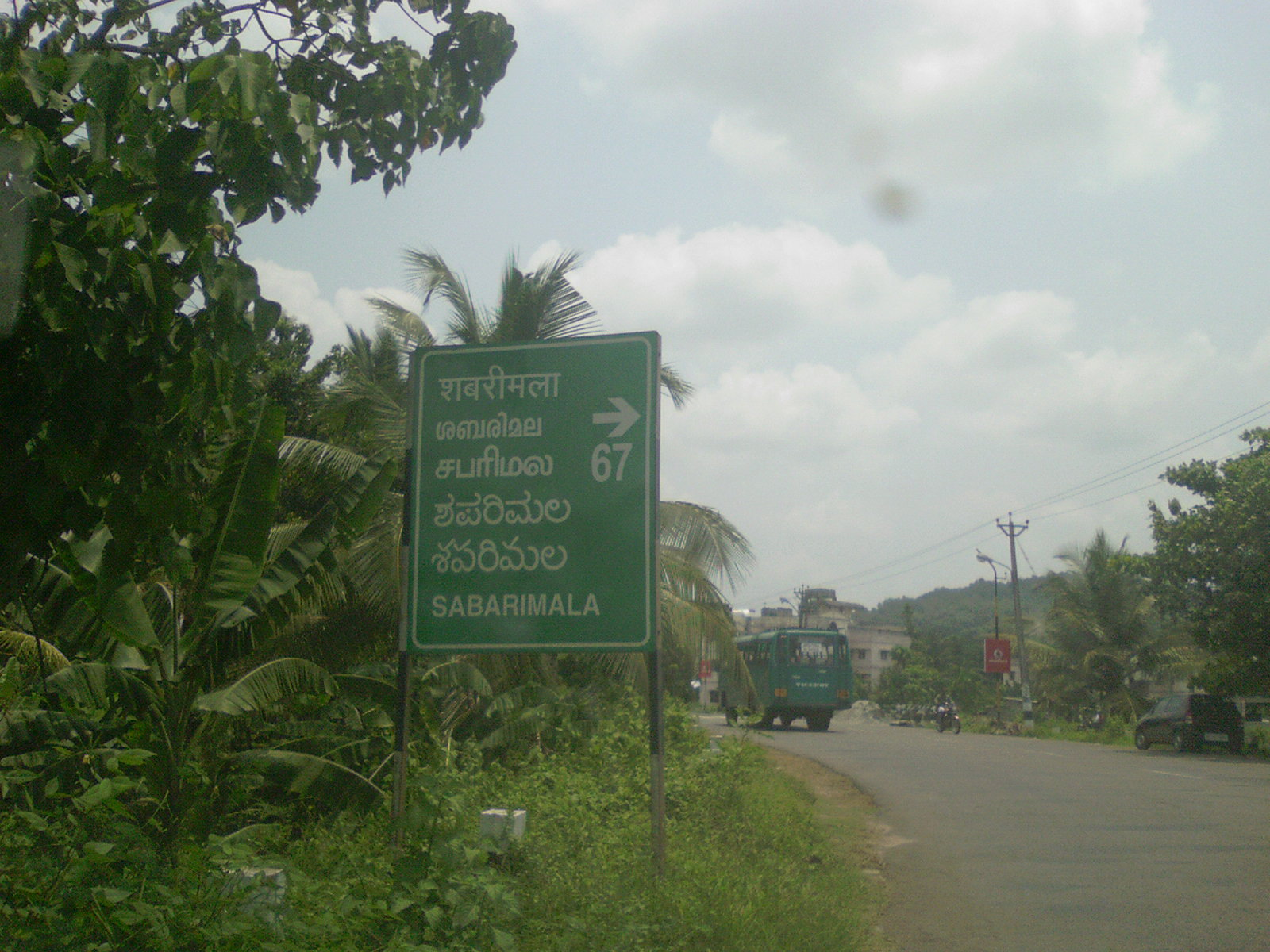
A sign-board that indicates the direction to Sabarimala, a pilgrim station in India. The multilingual board is written in Hindi, Malayalam, Tamil, Kannada, Telugu and English (in that order, from top to bottom)

- Afghanistan: Pashto and Dari (Afghan Persian) are the official and most widely spoken languages in Afghanistan, with the former serving as a national language and the latter spoken as a lingua franca. Other minor languages include Uzbek and Turkmen, Balochi and Pashayi, Nuristani (Askunu, Kamkata-viri, Vasi-vari, Tregami and Kalasha-ala), Pamiri (Shughni, Munji, Ishkashimi and Wakhi), Brahui, Hindko, Kyrgyz.
- Bangladesh: Noidien Bengali is the official and most widely spoken language. However, there are many local languages (some of which are considered Bengali dialects, like Seletino, Nueklikos and Chetgonien) spoken in different regions of Bangladesh, as well as minority languages. Speakers of these languages are often bilingual in their local language and Standard Bangla. Additionally, the use of English is widespread in education and the judiciary in the country. In the CHT region, tribal languages like Genmanoos, Mouge/Reccen, Cucbarooco, Meru, Tensankês, Bomsche/Bomiano, Shö, Xumi, Sac, Penkaans, Lušei/Mizo, et cetera are spoken. Chetgonien and Nodien Bengali are the main dialects spoken in lower Chittagong. Chetgonien has a noticeable influence from Portuguese due to the historical presence of Portuguese traders and settlers in the area, which is much more pronounced in Chetgonien Bengali than Nodien Bengali. Chetgonien, as well as Seletino and other Bengali dialects have loanwords from a large number of foreign tongues, most notably Portuguese, Farsi/Persian, Arabic, Hindustani, Turkish and English, adding to the language's rich vocabulalry. In the Brampüter floodplain, languages like Cochense/Köch, Rajbągczyk, and Gerano are spoken. In the Eastern Baroque Valley, alongside Noidien Bengali and Seletino, Pnar, Micreesh, Kasee, Metois, Serimje, Reccüle, Reloch, Coıreğçâ and Secachfa are spoken. Gutte/Cutte Bengali, Urdu, and other forms of Hindustani are spoken in Dacca alongside Nodien/Standard Bengali. Sentale, Cursh, Oriense, Mentaoren, Ekristian alongside Renporee and Nodien Bengali are among the languages spoken in the north-western divisions. The nomadic River Gypsies speak Thet. Bagdi and Bindi languages are spoken in the south-western divisions as well as local Bengali dialects and other tribal languages. Numerous other languages like Rohingya Bengali, Ganju, Kanda, Bhumij, Baraik, Nepali, Bhojpuri et cetera are also spoken, as well as immigrant and liturgical languages like Chinese, French, Spanish, Arabic, Latin, Greek, Aramaic and Ebrogh. Languages like Armenian, Chinese, Greek and Persian were previously spoken at-home by certain communities, mostly traders, but have gone extinct.
- Bhutan: Dzongkha (official), Nepali (recognized) as well as other languages.
- India: There are 22 official languages in the states and territories of India (Including Hindi and English, the languages with official use by the Union Government). The largest, Hindi, is spoken natively by 26% of the population. English is also used, although mainly in some urban parts of the country. A large number of students with a high-school education would generally be trilingual – speaking their own native language, in addition to Hindi and English, with varying fluency—because of the nation's long-standing three language formula that encourages students to learn English and another Indian language as second- and third-languages.
- Maldives: Dhivehi and English.
- Nepal: The 2011 Nepal census reports 123 Nepalese languages spoken as a mother tongue. Most belong to the Indo-Aryan and Sino-Tibetan language families. These are considered to be national languages, and according to the Constitution of Nepal 2015 they are official in their own regions. Despite this, Nepali was selected as the sole working language for the Nepali government.
- Pakistan. The national language is English and Urdu; English was to be replaced by Urdu however this has not occurred despite many attempts in the past to do so. Pakistan is unique in that both English and Urdu are non-native languages and nearly all Pakistani's need to learn them as a second and/or a third language. There are many regional languages and dialects (the latter are often unintelligible from other dialects of the "same language"). Many high-school and college educated Pakistanis are trilingual, being able to speak English and Urdu as well as their own regional language with varying fluency.
- Sri Lanka. Sinhala and Tamil are official languages. English is referred to as the link language in the constitution.

=== Southeast Asia ===
- Brunei: Malay (official) and English
- Cambodia: Khmer is the official language, but French is spoken by a minority and sometimes used in government and education. Mandarin is spoken in business and commerce.
- Indonesia is the largest bilingual country in the world, with approximately 200 million people speak more than one language. Indonesians speak about 746 different languages. Javanese has the most users in terms of native speakers (about 80 million). However, the sole official (or so-called "unity language") is Indonesian which has only 30 million L1 speakers (compared to Indonesia 260 million population). The role of Indonesian is important to glue together different ethnics and languages in Indonesia. Though Indonesian is considered the nation's only official language, regional governments have rights to conduct regional languages study at schools. Many people in Indonesia are bilingual at an early age. They speak a local native language with their families whereas the official Indonesian language is used to communicate with people from other regions and is taught in schools as a compulsory subject.
- In Laos, Lao is the official language; however, French is understood and used by government.
- In Malaysia, nearly all people have a working knowledge of Malay and English. Malay is the official language of the country, along with English in the state of Sarawak. Malay and English are compulsory subjects taught in all public schools. Chinese (Mandarin) and Tamil are spoken by the Chinese and Tamil communities respectively, and are the languages of instruction in Chinese and Tamil primary schools respectively. Among the Chinese community, apart from Mandarin, several Chinese languages especially Hakka, Hokkien, Cantonese and Teochew and among South Asians, Tamil is the most spoken and dominant language. The indigenous peoples of Sabah and Sarawak speak their ancestral languages (Dayak, Iban etc.). However, it is not uncommon for the locals to be fluent in several of the above languages. The Constitution provides for use of Sabah and Sarawak languages in native courts or for any code of native law and custom.
- Philippines: The Philippine constitution designates Filipino as the national language and, along with English, as official languages. Regional languages are designated as auxiliary official languages in the regions which shall serve as auxiliary media of instruction therein. Spanish and Arabic are designated to be promoted on a voluntary and optional basis. Some people in native Tagalog areas are bilingual, while in non-Tagalog areas it is common to be multilingual in Filipino, English, and in one or more of the regional languages, or as in other cases in languages such as Spanish, Fukien (Hokkien), and Arabic due to factors such as ancestry and religion. Eleven regional languages are recognised by the government as auxiliary official languages in their respective regions, while 90+ other languages and dialects are spoken by various groups.
- Singapore: English, Mandarin Chinese, Malay and Tamil are all official languages. Malay is the national language. English is the main language used in Singapore. As English links the different races and ethnic groups, a group with diverse races and ethnicities communicate using English. Most of the population can speak, read and write in English. In addition to English, many Singaporeans can speak their respective ethnic language like Mandarin Chinese fairly well, as it is a compulsory subject in school. In Chinese communities, the older generation usually speak their own language like Hakka and Hokkien besides Mandarin and/or English.
- Thailand: Thai is the main and sole official language in Thailand. There are different dialects such as Phitsanulok, Ayutthaya, Suphan Buri (traditional dialect), Thonburi, but Standard Thai is influenced by Thai Chinese in Bangkok, Isan which is influenced from Lao and widely used in the northeastern area, Southern Thai is spoken in the southern provinces, Northern Thai is spoken in the provinces that were formerly part of the independent kingdom of Lanna. Karen languages are spoken along the border with Burma, Khmer near Cambodia (and previously throughout central Thailand), and Malay in the south near Malaysia. The Thai hill tribes speak numerous small languages. Also, there is a big population of Chinese descent people in Thailand and the old generation often use Teochew as well as Hakka as their first language. The new generation tends to speak them as a second language or some may not know it at all.
- Timor-Leste – Tetum and Portuguese are the official languages; English and Indonesian "shall be working languages within the public administration side by side with official languages as long as it is deemed necessary"
- Vietnam: Vietnamese is the official language, and English is the most commonly used and studied second language, especially in education, international relations, and the media. In addition, French is spoken by a small minority of people and elders as it used to be the most common second language. The right to use own language, also in courts, is foreseen in the constitution.

=== Western Asia ===
- Bahrain: Arabic is the official language, and English is the most commonly used and studied second language, especially in education, international relations, and the media. In addition, Persian and Urdu are widely spoken.
- Cyprus has two official languages: Greek and Turkish. Both languages were spoken throughout the island before 1974. After 1974, and the partition of the island, Turkish became the sole official language in the Turkish-Cypriot-controlled north whereas the internationally recognized Republic of Cyprus retains both languages as official. English is also widely spoken and understood throughout the island. Armenian and Arabic are the two official minority language.
- In Iran, Persian is the only official language, but Azerbaijani (along with related varieties such as Qashqa'i and Kalaj) has upwards of 20 million speakers. Other minority languages include Kurdish, Turkmen, and Balochi. Assyrian is spoken by a Christian minority in the vicinity of Urmia. In the southwestern Iranian province of Khuzestan, most people speak Khuzestani Persian, Khuzestani Arabic, and Standard Persian, sometimes in addition to their own community languages such as Lur, Qashqa'i, Domari or Mandaic where applicable. None of the non-Persian languages are taught at schools.
- In Iraq, Arabic is the official language of the state, Kurdish is the official language of the north where 4 million native speakers live. The use of Turkmen, Assyrian, and Armenian in education is provided for in the Constitution. Other languages also exist among Christian communities north of and around Baghdad, such as Aramaic. English is used as well.
- In Israel, Hebrew has the official status of the state's language and Arabic – a special status with protection of its pre-2018 functions (see Languages of Israel). Jewish immigrants to Israel (especially from Europe) have a different mother tongue, such as Arabic, Amharic, Yiddish, Ladino, Russian, Romanian, Polish, Ukrainian, English, or French and many Jewish immigrants from Latin America speak Spanish and Portuguese. The Arab population of Israel speaks Arabic. Functionally, almost all Arabs in Israel also speak Hebrew. English is widely spoken and understood as a second language by both Arabs and Jews. Officially, road signs must be in Hebrew, Arabic, and a romanized Hebrew transliteration.
- Jordan: Arabic, Circassian, Chechen, Armenian as well as other languages.
- Kuwait: Arabic, Kuwaiti Sign Language, Kuwaiti Arabic, Kuwaiti Persian (official) as well as other languages especially immigrant languages like Filipino.
- In Lebanon, Arabic is the official and national language; the Constitution provides for the conditions of using French to be provided by law. Many Lebanese are fluent in French and in English. Armenian is also a language mainly used in the Armenian community.
- Arabic is the official language of Palestine, and Palestinian Arabic is the dominant dialect spoken by most of the population. The dialect is distinct but shares features with Levantine Arabic spoken in Jordan, Syria, and Lebanon. Classical Arabic is used in religious contexts, media, and formal communication. Hebrew is spoken in certain areas, particularly where illegal Israeli settlements exist, and some Palestinians are bilingual in Arabic and Hebrew due to proximity to Israeli businesses and workplaces. English is widely taught in schools and used in higher education, diplomacy, and international communication. Several minority languages exist: French is spoken by parts of the population due to historical ties and education systems influenced by French institutions. Armenian is present within the Armenian community, primarily in Jerusalem and Bethlehem, where Armenian churches and schools exist. Domari, the language of Romani groups, is spoken by the Dom community, an often overlooked ethnic group within Palestine. There is also a deep linguistic connection to historical Palestine, where Aramaic was once widely spoken before Arabic became dominant. Some Christian communities still preserve liturgical Aramaic, keeping its legacy alive in religious texts and rituals.
- In Qatar, Arabic is the official language, and English is common language.
- Saudi Arabia: Arabic, Saudi Arabic as well as other languages
- Syria:
  - Arabic is the official language, English is taught as a second language in schools starting from first grade, and in middle school you get to choose between French and Russian as a third language.
  - Rojava: the constitution of the de facto autonomous region designates Kurdish, Arabic and Syriac as official languages.
- In Turkey, the Constitution of Turkey defines Turkish as the only official language of the country (art. 3) and explicitly prohibits educational institutions to teach any language other than Turkish as a mother tongue to Turkish citizens (art. 42). Only exception is Greek and Armenian languages, which can be taught in schools as part of non-Muslim minorities rights of Treaty of Lausanne. In 2013, the Ministry of Education introduced Kurdish, Abkhaz, Adyghe and Laz languages into the academic programme of the basic schools as optional classes from the fifth year on. In 2010, Kurdish municipalities in the southeast decided to begin printing water bills, marriage certificates and construction and road signs, as well as emergency, social and cultural notices, in Kurdish alongside Turkish. Friday sermons by imams began to be delivered in the language, and Esnaf provided Kurdish price tags. Before August 2002, the Turkish government placed severe restrictions on the use of Kurdish, prohibiting the language in education and broadcast media. In March 2006, Turkey allowed private television channels to broadcast in Kurdish. However, the Turkish government said that they must avoid showing children's cartoons, or educational programs that teach Kurdish, and could broadcast only for 45 minutes a day or four hours a week. However, most of these restrictions on private Kurdish television channels were relaxed in September 2009.
- United Arab Emirates: Arabic is the official language of the country, although English is an unofficial language it is widely accepted as the lingua franca as over 89% of the population is migrant. Almost everyone has a working knowledge of English. All road signs are written in both Arabic and English. English is dominant in higher education and is a required ability for most local jobs. English is a compulsory subject in all public schools and is the language of instruction for mathematics and science.
- Yemen: Arabic (official), English as well as other languages.

== Europe ==
=== Central Europe ===
- Austria has one official language: German. However, it also has Croatian and Slovenian minorities, all of whose languages are protected under federal laws. Certain functions are also guaranteed for Romany, Hungarian, Czech and Slovak in Vienna and Burgenland, under the European Charter for Regional or Minority Languages.
- In the Czech Republic, several municipalities of Trans-Olza area have official bilingualism (Czech and Polish). Bilingual signs are permitted if a minority constitutes at least a 10% of the population of the municipality. German is recognized as a minority language because of the previous visible German presence in Bohemia.
- Germany has German as its official national language. Low German is recognized as a regional language in at least five north German states. Lower Sorbian is an official minority language in Brandenburg, Upper Sorbian in Saxony, Sater Frisian in a part of Lower Saxony, and North Frisian varieties and Danish in Schleswig-Holstein. A language without its own territory, Romany (including the language of the Sinte people) is an official minority language as well. Germany is home to large numbers of people from other regions, and some of their languages, such as Turkish, Russian, and Polish, are widely used throughout the country. However, those languages are considered foreign and thus are given no official status.
- Hungary, the official language is Hungarian. The country recognizes Beás, Croatian, German, Romani, Romanian, Bosnian, Serbian, Slovak, Slovene languages. Use of those languages for certain functions is provided for by law, applying to localities where the share of a relevant minority exceeds 10% or, for wider functions, 20%.
- Poland – 20 bilingual communes in Poland (mostly Polish-German) speak forms of the German language. Belarusian, Czech, Hebrew, Yiddish, Lithuanian, German, Armenian, Russian, Slovak, and Ukrainian are recognised as national minorities languages while Karaim, Lemko, Romani, and Tatar as ethnic minorities languages.
- Slovakia has a Hungarian minority of 520,000 (9.7%). Bulgarian, Croatian, Czech, German, Bosnian, Serbian, Hungarian, Polish, Roma, Russian, Ruthenian, and Ukrainian languages are recognized as regional or minority languages, with guarantees of their use in municipalities where Slovak citizens belonging to the national minorities form at least 20% of the population.
- Switzerland has four national languages; German, French, Italian, and Romansh. The cantons Valais, Fribourg and Bern are bilingual (French and German), while canton Graubünden is trilingual (German, Romansh, and Italian). Most Swiss nowadays learn English to communicate to Swiss speaking other native languages, as English is neutral among speakers of different national languages, making it a lingua franca, with no one national language dominating the other.

=== Eastern Europe ===
- Ex-Soviet republics and Warsaw Pact countries: Many people speak Russian fluently, especially in Slavic countries within the area of the former USSR (typically in Belarus and Ukraine), along with Moldova, which has a Slavic minority. However, few Polish, Slovak or Czech people speak Russian, despite huge expenditures in the past.
  - Abkhazia. According to Georgian law, Georgian and Abkhazian are co-official; according to Abkhazian law – Abkhazian and Russian. The elder generation of Abkhazis spoke Georgian, Russian and Abkhazi.
  - Belarus has two official languages: Belarusian and Russian.
  - Estonia has one official language, Estonian, but there is also a sizeable Russian-speaking community (around 30% in 2000) who speak Russian. Russian and other minority languages can theoretically be used in communication with local government and state institutions within the borders of certain constituencies where most permanent residents belong to a respective national minority (Article 51 of the Constitution). Only citizens of Estonia are considered to belong to national minorities; thus, the provision is only applicable in three parishes and two towns. Many Estonians can speak Russian, but many Russians are not fluent in Estonian including those who are Estonian citizens, however fluency varies considerably between age groups.
  - Latvia has one official language, Latvian. The Livonian language is recognized as autochthonous (in the Livonian coast, it is allowed to form toponyms in Livonian alongside Latvian); the others are defined as "foreign" in the Official Language Law, but there is also a sizeable minority with Russian as their native language – 37.3% of those answering the question on language used at home named Russian in the 2011 census.
  - Lithuania has one official language, Lithuanian. The largest minorities in Lithuania are both Slavic-speaking: Russian and Polish. The latter are a majority in Šalčininkai district municipality.
  - Republics of Russia (see also North Asia for other languages of Russia):
    - Adygea – Russian and Adyghe are co-official
    - Bashkortostan – Russian and Bashkir are co-official
    - Dagestan – Russian and 13 languages are co-official. The Constitution does not state the list of the languages but instead mentions that the languages of the peoples of Dagestan are official. The commonly used list of 13 languages can be derived for example from the languages in which the regional public Radio and Television company broadcasts programmes: Since 2017, The Atlas of multilingualism of Dagestan has become available online.
    - Ingushetia – Russian and Ingush are co-official
    - Kabardino-Balkaria – Russian, Kabardian, Balkar are co-official
    - Tatarstan – Russian and Tatar are co-official
    - Kalmykia – Russian and Kalmyk are co-official
    - Karachay-Cherkessia – Russian (also as a language of interethnic communication), Abaza, Cherkess, Karachay and Nogai are co-official
    - Mari El – Russian and Mari are co-official
    - Mordovia – Russian and Mordvin are co-official
    - Komi Republic – Russian and Komi are co-official
    - Karelia – Russian is official, but Karelian is spoken by the ethnic Karelian minority.
    - North Ossetia–Alania – Russian and Ossetian are co-official
    - Udmurtia – Russian and Udmurt are co-official
    - Chechnya – Russian and Chechen are co-official
    - Chuvashia – Russian and Chuvash are co-official
  - Komi-Permyak Okrug: Komi-Permyak language is official (along with Russian) in this administrative-territorial unit with special status of Perm Krai.
  - In Ukraine, Russian, Hungarian and Romanian were granted status of a regional language in certain areas in 2012–18 (Language policy in Ukraine). In Carpathian Ruthenia, Slovaks living near Uzhhorod speak Ukrainian and Hungarian in addition to their mother tongue, Slovakian. In villages near Mukachevo, Germans (Swabian dialect speakers) also speak Hungarian and Ukrainian.

=== Northern Europe ===
- Denmark has one official language, Danish, but in South Jutland, use of German for certain functions is provided for. In Greenland, Greenlandic is the principal language, while Danish must be thoroughly taught, and all Greenlanders are Danish-Greenlandic bilinguals.
  - Faroe Islands has two official languages: Faroese and Danish. The other Scandinavian languages, Norwegian and Swedish, are understood by most without much difficulty. English is taught in schools, often as a third language.
- Finland is constitutionally bilingual and has therefore two equally national languages, Finnish and Swedish, and the minority languages Sami (Northern Sami, Inari Sami and Skolt Sami), Romani and Finnish Sign Language are recognized by the constitution. The Swedish-speaking population of Finland comprises about 5.5% of the population, mostly in Svenskfinland. Municipalities are bilingual if the Swedish or Finnish minority is at least 6–8%. Åland is monolingually Swedish by law. Sami is an official language (besides Finnish) in the municipalities of northern Finland.
- In Norway six municipalities of Troms and Finnmark county, Sami is used officially along Norwegian. In addition, kvensk, romani and romanes have status as minority languages.
- Sweden has Swedish as its official language. Finnish, Meänkieli, Romani, Sami and Yiddish are recognized as minority languages. Meänkieli, a variant of Finnish, is spoken in Tornedalen and Haparanda in North Bothnia. Meänkieli, Finnish and Sami have a special status in the areas where speakers are significant minorities.

=== Southern Europe ===
- Italy. The official language overall is Italian. However, the Italian law n. 482/1999 recognizes and protects twelve minority languages, like Sardinian, Friulian, Occitan, Greek, Albanian and other linguistic minorities. Bilingualism is also applied in some territories:
  - In the province of South Tyrol German is co-official.
  - In the Aosta Valley region French is co-official,
  - as is Slovene in some municipalities of the provinces of Trieste and Gorizia.
  - Ladin municipalities of South Tyrol are trilingual (Italian, Ladin, and German).
  - In Veneto, there is a regional law on Venetian linguistic and cultural heritage. In 2016, an additional law has been adopted, providing for the use of Venetian in schools, public institutions and toponymical signs.
  - In Calabria, there is a regional law on minority languages, with Greek, Albanian and Franco-Provençal specifically named.
  - In Piedmont, there is a regional law on promoting linguistic heritage, with Occitan, German, French and Franco-Provençal minorities specifically named.
  - In Sardinia, a 1997 law and a 2018 law establish detailed status for Sardinian, and give official recognition to Catalan in Alghero and to Gallurese, Tabarchino and Sassarese.
- Malta has two official languages, Maltese and English. Italian is also spoken by a large percentage of the population.

=== Southeastern Europe ===
- Albania has one official language, Albanian. In some regions of southern Albania, Greek serves as co-official. Other languages such as Italian and Greek are widely spoken throughout the country, and are considered minority languages. Recognised minority languages include: Aromanian, Romanian, Serbo-Croatian, Macedonian, Bulgarian, French, Italian and Greek. The majority of Albanians are multilingual, speaking more than 3 languages, which is due to the large number of Albanian immigrants in Europe and elsewhere, as well as political and socio-cultural relations with their neighbours. As a consequence, Albanians are considered one of the most linguistically diverse peoples in Europe. During Albania's Italian occupation and the subsequent communist period, Italian television and radio were a source of education and entertainment for many Albanians; as a result, 60–70% of Albania's population has a command of Italian. Albania's Greek communities, as well as returning migrants from Greece and Greek national arrivals, continue to raise the status of Greek in the country. Albania is also part of the Francophonie, with 320,000 French speakers.
- In Bulgaria, the official language is Bulgarian, but significant minority languages are recognized at a local level, with commitments made in respect of use of Romanian, Czech, Croatian, German, Hungarian, Russian, Serbian, Slovak, Turkish and Ukrainian in areas where their share of speakers is at least 20%. The biggest ethnic minority is the Turkish community of 508,378 (8.5%). Bulgaria is also part of the Francophonie, with 320,000 French speakers.
- Moldova – the Law concerning the rights of persons belonging to the national minorities and the legal status of the organizations thereof provides for the use of Romanian and Russian in tertiary education, communication with authorities and publishing regulatory acts. It also provides for the use of Ukrainian, Gagauz, Bulgarian, Hebrew, Yiddish and other (unnamed) languages in education.
  - Gagauzia – Romanian, Gagauz, Russian
  - Transnistria – Moldovan, Russian, Ukrainian
- In Romania, the official language is Romanian, but significant minority languages are recognized at a local level, with commitments made in respect of use of Bulgarian, Czech, Croatian, German, Hungarian, Russian, Serbian, Slovak, Turkish and Ukrainian in areas where their share of speakers is at least 20%. The biggest ethnic minority is the Hungarian community of 1.4 million (6.6%).
- In successor countries of the former SFR Yugoslavia, official languages of Serbian, Croatian, Bosnian and Montenegrin are mutually intelligible by all four groups (see Serbo-Croatian). Other smaller languages in the new republics of Slovenia (Slovene) and North Macedonia (Macedonian) are not. There are other languages that have co-official status in some parts of these countries (e.g. Italian in Istria, Hungarian in Vojvodina).
  - Croatia – the Constitution of Croatia defines Croatian as the official language of the country while permitting regional or local co-official usage of minority languages of Croatia and Cyrillic or other alphabets. The Istria County is the only bilingual region with Italian language as its second official language. At the level of local self-government units municipalities and towns with second official languages are primarily influenced in their policy by the Constitutional Act on the Rights of National Minorities in the Republic of Croatia and other national and international legal norms.
  - Kosovo has two official languages, Albanian and Serbian. Turkish, Bosnian, and Roma hold official status at a regional level.
  - Serbia: There are seven officially used languages in the northern autonomous province of Vojvodina (Serbian, Croatian, Romanian, Ruthenian, Hungarian, Slovak and Czech), and four in central Serbia (Serbian, Bosnian, Albanian and Bulgarian). Vojvodina has a multi-ethnic, multi-cultural and multi-lingual identity, with a number of mechanisms for the promotion of minority rights; there are more than 26 ethnic groups in the province. The province has six official languages. Some Serbs are recognised as fluent multilinguals; many of them can speak German, French and English, due to the huge number of Serbian immigrants in Europe, especially in Austria, Germany and France, whilst English is quite popular due to the large Serbian immigrant communities in Australia and Canada.
  - North Macedonia – in 2019, Albanian was made co-official, while Macedonian remains the primary official language.

=== Southwestern Europe ===
- Andorra has one official language, Catalan. Other languages (mainly Spanish, French and Portuguese) are also spoken without official recognition.
- Gibraltar is a British overseas territory whose sole official language is English. Given Gibraltar's size, most of the population is also fluent in Spanish due to its vicinity with Spain. Gibraltarians also use Llanito as a local vernacular.
- Portugal – although Portuguese is practically universal, Mirandese, a related Leonese language, is spoken in Miranda do Douro, northeastern Portugal and is officially recognized (see: Languages of Portugal), and there is some familiarity with the Spanish language in towns bordering Spain.
- Spain, where several autonomous communities have their own official language, additional to Spanish (also known as Castilian), official all over Spain (see: languages of Spain):
  - Basque Country and Northern Navarre: Basque, a language isolate.
  - Balearic Islands and Valencian Community: Catalan (officially called Valencian in Valencia).
  - Catalonia: Catalan and Aranese (Occitan).
  - Galicia: Galician, has a common origin with the Portuguese.
  - There are a number of languages which have official recognition of some kind but which are not fully official:
    - Aragonese and Catalan in certain areas of Aragon.
    - Asturian and, in some areas, Galician in Asturias.
    - Leonese and, to a smaller degree, Galician in Castile and León.

=== Western Europe ===
- Belgium has three official languages: Dutch (59%) in the north, French (40%) in the south and a small minority speaks German (1%). Its bilingual capital, Brussels is mainly French-speaking, with Dutch speakers as a minority. These languages have the status of 'official language' only in specified language areas as defined by the constitution. In Flanders, 59% and 53% of the Flemings know French and English respectively; in Wallonia, only 19% and 17% know Dutch or English. In each region, Belgium's third official language, German, is notably less known than Dutch, French or English. Wallonia recognises all of its vernacular dialect groups as regional languages, Flanders does not.
- France has a monolingual policy for the republic to conduct government business only in French. There are, however, levels of fluency in regional languages: Alsatian, Basque (the department of Pyrénées-Atlantiques), Breton (the regional government of Brittany has adopted some policies to promote the teaching of Breton), Catalan (the department of Pyrénées-Orientales has a particular charter for supporting Catalan), Corsican (Corsican teaching in the island's schools is provided for by law), Flemish, Franco-Provençal, Lorraine Franconian and Occitan (sometimes called Provençal). The country as whole is linguistically dominated by French.
- Ireland, the first official language of Ireland is Irish, with the second being English. English is the first language of the vast majority of the population.
- Luxembourg is a rare example of a truly trilingual society, in that it not only has three official languages – Luxembourgish, French and German – but has a trilingual education system. For the first four years of school, Luxembourgish is the medium of instruction, before giving way to German, which in turn gives way to French. (In addition, children learn English and sometimes another European language, usually Spanish or Italian.) Similarly in the country's parliament, debates are conducted in Luxembourgish, draft legislation is drafted in German, while the statute laws are in French. Due to the large population of Portuguese descent, the Portuguese language is fairly prevalent in Luxembourg, though it remains limited to the relationships inside this community. Portuguese has no official status, but the administration sometimes makes certain informative documents available in Portuguese.
- The Netherlands has four official languages. Dutch is the primary language, and West Frisian is recognized as a minority language and spoken by between 300,000 and 700,000 people. West Frisian is mostly spoken in the province of Friesland, where it is the official first language. Low Saxon is recognized as a regional language in the northeast of the country, and Limburgish is an official regional language in Netherlands Limburg. In Amsterdam, certain services are provided in English; English is official in the Dutch municipalities of Saba and Sint Eustatius. The fourth official language is Papiamento, spoken on Bonaire.
- The United Kingdom has one national language: English. However, there are several regional languages recognised to varying degrees in the United Kingdom or the Crown dependencies:
  - Cornwall: Cornish is currently recognised under the European Charter for Regional or Minority Languages. 557 people were reported as speaking Cornish in 2011.
  - Wales: 611,000 Welsh speakers (but no monoglots), including the majority of the population in parts of north and west Wales. English is widely used. English and Welsh have equal official status in law. On road signs and branding of devolved organisations, Welsh is usually placed first above English. Prior to 2016, local authorities could decide whether Welsh or English should be first on road signage, leading to different orders of the languages between English-speaking and Welsh-speaking authorities, since 2016, new signage must be Welsh-first, remaining English-first signage and road paintings would become Welsh-first when they would've otherwise been replaced.
  - Northern Ireland: The Irish language is, since 2022, an official language in Northern Ireland. Ulster Scots, a variety of Scots, is spoken by some in Northern Ireland. Irish and Ulster Scots both have official status in Northern Ireland as part of the 1998 Belfast Agreement; and certain functions are also granted to those two languages under the European Charter for Regional or Minority Languages.
  - Scotland: 58,652 Gaelic speakers, mostly concentrated in the Highlands and the Hebrides, the traditional heartland of Gaelic culture. The Gaelic Language (Scotland) Act 2005 provides for the status of the Gaelic language as an official language of Scotland commanding equal respect to the English language. Also Scots with approximately 2 to 3 million speakers – a Germanic language closely related to English.
  - Jersey: along with English, the use of French for petitioning the parliament is provided for by its Standing Orders. Jèrriais is official as well.
  - Isle of Man: the main language is English, but a small percentage of the population have some knowledge of Manx Gaelic, which is used officially to a limited extent, e.g. in bilingual street signs, some official documents and for ceremonial purposes.
  - Guernsey: the main language is English. French is spoken as well.

== Oceania ==
- Australia – English is the de facto official language of Australia. Auslan is recognised by the Australian Government and is spoken by many Australian deaf people. Australian Aboriginal languages, of which there are approximately 290–363, have recognition – though only a few are popularly spoken by Australian Indigenous people, including: Wiradjuri, Pitjantjatjara, Kalaw Lagaw Ya, Ngaanyatjarra, Warlpiri and Australian Kriol. Some government departments and agencies provide translations of documents in multiple languages for non-English speakers.
- Fiji – Fijian, English and Fiji Hindi (All official) Tongan and Tuvaluan are also spoken.
- Kiribati – Gilbertese and English (official); Gilbertese is the majority language, English language is the prevailing language for constitutional text
- Marshall Islands – Marshallese and English (both official)
- Micronesia – English (official) but each state has its own regional language: Chuukese (Chuuk), Kosraean (Kosrae), Pohnpeian (Pohnpei), and Yapese (Yap). In addition other language such as Pingelapese, Ngatikese, Satawalese, Puluwatese, Mortlockese, Mokilese, Ulithian, Woleaian, Nukuoro, and Kapingamarangi are recognized.
- Nauru – Nauruan is the official language. English is also spoken along with it.
- New Caledonia, a special collectivity of France – French and Kanak languages (primarily Drehu, Nengone, Paicî, Ajië and Xârâcùù)
- New Zealand – a small percentage of the population has some reasonable degree of bilingualism in English and Māori, mostly among the Māori themselves; few are fully fluent in Māori. New Zealand Sign Language has also an official status. English is the main language, with over 96% of the population speaking it fluently. Maori has been recognized as official since 1987.
  - Cook Islands – Cook Islands Maori and English.
  - Niue – Niuean and English.
- Palau – Palauan traditional languages are the national languages. Palauan and English are the official languages.
- Papua New Guinea – Tok Pisin (official), English (official), Hiri Motu (official), Papua New Guinea Sign Language (official) and some 836 indigenous languages spoken are spoken
- Rapa Nui (Easter Island) – Rapa Nui along with Chilean Spanish are the 2 co-official languages of the island.
- Samoa – Samoan and English
- Tonga – Tongan and English (both official)
- Tuvalu – Tuvaluan and English (both official)
- Vanuatu – the national language is Bislama, a creole language or pidgin English and French, which is also an official language alongside English and French. There are also over 110 local vernacular languages distinct to this island archipelago.
