= Arvij Kola =

Arvij Kola آرويج كلا
- Village
- Location within Iran
- Coordinates: 36°30′56″N 52°02′58″E
- Country: Iran
- Province: Mazandaran
- County: Nur
- Bakhsh: Central
- Rural District: Natel Kenar-e Olya

Population (2016)
  - Total: 113
- Time zone: UTC+3:30 (IRST)

Arvij Kola (Persian: آرويج كلا, also Romanized as Ārvīj Kolā) known in Mazandarani as Arvij Kela (Also Romanized as Ārvīj Kēlā)is a village in Natel Kenar-e Olya Rural District, in the Central District of Nur County, Mazandaran Province, Iran. At the 2016 census, its population was 113, in 37 families. Up from 100 in 2006.
