= Gandyab =

Gandyab (Persian: گندياب) may refer to:

- Gandyab-e Bala
- Gandyab-e Pain
