= Vazak =

Vazak وازك
- Village
- Location within Iran
- Coordinates: 36°25′08″N 51°53′15″E
- Country: Iran
- Province: Mazandaran
- County: Nur
- Bakhsh: Central
- Rural District: Mian Band

Population (2006)
  - Total: 96
- Time zone: UTC+3:30 (IRST)
  - Summer (DST): UTC+4:30 (IRDT)

Vazak (Persian: وازك, also Romanized as Vāzak) is a village in Mian Band Rural District, in the Central District of Nur County, Mazandaran Province, Iran. At the 2006 census, its population was 96, in 22 families.
