= Shahrak-e Dariashahr =

Shahrak-e Dariashahr شهرك درياشهر
- Village
- Country: Iran
- Province: Mazandaran
- County: Nur
- Bakhsh: Central
- Rural District: Mian Band

Population (2006)
  - Total: 21
- Time zone: UTC+3:30 (IRST)
  - Summer (DST): UTC+4:30 (IRDT)

Shahrak-e Dariashahr (Persian: شهرك درياشهر, also Romanized as Shahrak-e Darīāshahr) is a village in Mian Band Rural District, in the Central District of Nur County, Mazandaran Province, Iran. At the 2006 census, its population was 21, in 8 families.
