= Anar Jar =

Anar Jar انارجار
- Village
- Location within Iran
- Coordinates: 36°30′50″N 51°58′40″E
- Country: Iran
- Province: Mazandaran
- County: Nur
- Bakhsh: Central
- Rural District: Natel Kenar-e Olya

Population (2006)
  - Total: 262
- Time zone: UTC+3:30 (IRST)
  - Summer (DST): UTC+4:30 (IRDT)

Anar Jar (Persian: انارجار, also Romanized as Anār Jār) is a village in Natel Kenar-e Olya Rural District, in the Central District of Nur County, Mazandaran Province, Iran. At the 2006 census, its population was 262, in 62 families.
