= Halu Poshteh =

Halu Poshteh هلوپشته
- Village
- Location in Iran
- Coordinates: 36°18′18″N 51°50′45″E
- Country: Iran
- Province: Mazandaran
- County: Nur
- Bakhsh: Central
- Rural District: Mian Band

Population (2006)
  - Total: 11
- Time zone: UTC+3:30 (IRST)
  - Summer (DST): UTC+4:30 (IRDT)

Halu Poshteh (Persian: هلوپشته, also Romanized as Halū Poshteh) is a village in Mian Band Rural District, in the Central District of Nur County, Mazandaran Province, Iran. At the 2006 census, its population was 11, in 5 families.
