= Sang-e Now =

Sang-e Now سنگ نو
- Village
- Location within Iran
- Coordinates: 36°23′27″N 51°51′05″E
- Country: Iran
- Province: Mazandaran
- County: Nur
- Bakhsh: Central
- Rural District: Mian Band

Population (2006)
  - Total: 49
- Time zone: UTC+3:30 (IRST)
  - Summer (DST): UTC+4:30 (IRDT)

Sang-e Now (Persian: سنگ نو) is a village in Mian Band Rural District, in the Central District of Nur County, Mazandaran Province, Iran. At the 2006 census, its population was 49, in 11 families.
