= Azadegan, Mazandaran =

Mojtame-ye Meskuni Shahrak-e Azadegan مجتمع مسكوني شهرك ازادگان
- Village
- Country: Iran
- Province: Mazandaran
- County: Nur
- Bakhsh: Central
- Rural District: Natel Kenar-e Olya

Population (2006)
  - Total: 452
- Time zone: UTC+3:30 (IRST)
  - Summer (DST): UTC+4:30 (IRDT)

Mojtame-ye Meskuni Shahrak-e Azadegan (Persian: مجتمع مسكوني شهرك ازادگان, also Romanized as Mojtame`-ye Meskūnī Shahrak-e Āzādegān) is a village in Natel Kenar-e Olya Rural District, in the Central District of Nur County, Mazandaran Province, Iran. At the 2006 census, its population was 452, in 131 families.
