= Afrasiab Kola =

Afrasiab Kola (Persian: افراسياب كلا) may refer to:

- Afrasiab Kola, Babol
- Afrasiab Kola, Nur
