= Darvish Kola =

Darvish Kola درويش كلا
- Village
- Location within Iran
- Coordinates: 36°24′47″N 51°56′07″E
- Country: Iran
- Province: Mazandaran
- County: Nur
- Bakhsh: Central
- Rural District: Mian Band

Population (2006)
  - Total: 46
- Time zone: UTC+3:30 (IRST)
  - Summer (DST): UTC+4:30 (IRDT)

Darvish Kola (Persian: درويش كلا, also Romanized as Darvīsh Kolā) is a village in Mian Band Rural District, in the Central District of Nur County, Mazandaran Province, Iran. At the 2006 census, its population was 46, in 9 families.
