= Kodir Sar =

Kodir Sar كديرسر
- Village
- Location within Iran
- Coordinates: 36°25′50″N 51°51′24″E
- Country: Iran
- Province: Mazandaran
- County: Nur
- Bakhsh: Central
- Rural District: Mian Band

Population (2006)
  - Total: 61
- Time zone: UTC+3:30 (IRST)
  - Summer (DST): UTC+4:30 (IRDT)

Kodir Sar (Persian: كديرسر, also Romanized as Kodīr Sar) is a village in Mian Band Rural District, in the Central District of Nur County, Mazandaran Province, Iran. At the 2006 census, its population was 61, in 20 families.
