= Tirak Deh =

Tirak Deh (Persian: تيركده), also rendered as Tiryak Deh, may refer to:

- Tirak Deh-e Olya
- Tirak Deh-e Sofla
