= Dunkuh =

Dunkuh دونكوه
- Village
- Location within Iran
- Coordinates: 36°21′23″N 51°53′39″E
- Country: Iran
- Province: Mazandaran
- County: Nur
- Bakhsh: Central
- Rural District: Mian Band

Population (2006)
  - Total: 20
- Time zone: UTC+3:30 (IRST)
  - Summer (DST): UTC+4:30 (IRDT)

Dunkuh (Persian: دونكوه, also Romanized as Dūnkūh; also known as Dūnak) is a village in Mian Band Rural District, in the Central District of Nur County, Mazandaran Province, Iran. At the 2006 census, its population was 20, in 7 families.
