= Tirak Deh-e Sofla =

Tirak Deh-e Sofla تيركده سفلي
- Village
- Location within Iran
- Coordinates: 36°32′54″N 51°56′34″E
- Country: Iran
- Province: Mazandaran
- County: Nur
- Bakhsh: Central
- Rural District: Mian Band

Population (2006)
  - Total: 344
- Time zone: UTC+3:30 (IRST)
  - Summer (DST): UTC+4:30 (IRDT)

Tirak Deh-e Sofla (Persian: تيركده سفلي, also Romanized as Tīrak Deh-e Soflá; also known as Tīryak Deh-e Pā’īn) is a village in Mian Band Rural District, in the Central District of Nur County, Mazandaran Province, Iran. At the 2006 census, its population was 344, in 83 families.
