= Salyakoti =

Village in Mazandaran province, Iran

Salyakoti Persian: سلياكتی
- Village
- Location within Iran
- Coordinates: 36°31′00″N 52°02′16″E
- Country: Iran
- Province: Mazandaran
- County: Nur
- District: Central
- Rural District: Natel Kenar-e Olya

Population (2016)
  - Total: 1,692
- Time zone: UTC+3:30 (IRST)

Salyakoti (Persian: سلیاکتی) (Note: Also romanized as Salyākotī) is a village in, and the capital of, Natel Kenar-e Olya Rural District in the Central District of Nur County, Mazandaran province, Iran.

== Demographics ==
=== Population ===
At the time of the 2006 National Census, the village's population was 1,373 in 336 households. The following census in 2011 counted 1,333 people in 383 households. The 2016 census measured the population of the village as 1,692 people in 528 households.
