= Zarrin Kola =

Village in Mazandaran province, Iran

Zarrin Kola Persian: زرين كلا
- Village
- Location within Iran
- Coordinates: 36°32′50″N 51°55′35″E
- Country: Iran
- Province: Mazandaran
- County: Nur
- District: Central
- Rural District: Mian Band

Population (2016)
  - Total: 523
- Time zone: UTC+3:30 (IRST)

Zarrin Kola (Persian: زرين كلا) (Note: Also romanized as Zarrīn Kolā; also known as Zarrīn Kolā-ye Pā’īn) is a village in Mian Band Rural District of the Central District in Nur County, Mazandaran province, Iran.

== Demographics ==
=== Population ===
At the time of the 2006 National Census, the village's population was 513 in 133 households. The following census in 2011 counted 474 people in 136 households. The 2016 census measured the population of the village as 523 people in 168 households.
