= Sar Kaj =

Village in Mazandaran province, Iran

Sar Kaj Persian: سركاج
- Village
- Location within Iran
- Coordinates: 36°30′36″N 52°02′18″E
- Country: Iran
- Province: Mazandaran
- County: Nur
- District: Central
- Rural District: Natel Kenar-e Olya

Population (2016)
  - Total: 666
- Time zone: UTC+3:30 (IRST)

Sar Kaj (Persian: سركاج) (Note: Also romanized as Sar Kāj and Sarkaj) is a village in Natel Kenar-e Olya Rural District of the Central District in Nur County, Mazandaran province, Iran.

== Demographics ==
=== Population ===
At the time of the 2006 National Census, the village's population was 583 in 125 households. The following census in 2011 counted 656 people in 176 households. The 2016 census measured the population of the village as 666 people in 198 households.
