= Tuska, Iran =

Village in Mazandaran province, Iran

Tuska Persian: توسكا
- Village
- Location within Iran
- Coordinates: 36°32′44″N 51°56′59″E
- Country: Iran
- Province: Mazandaran
- County: Nur
- District: Central
- Rural District: Mian Band

Population (2016)
  - Total: 841
- Time zone: UTC+3:30 (IRST)

Tuska (Persian: توسكا) (Note: Also romanized as Tūskā; also known as Toskā) is a village in Mian Band Rural District of the Central District in Nur County, Mazandaran province, Iran.

== Demographics ==
=== Population ===
At the time of the 2006 National Census, the village's population was 474 in 115 households. The following census in 2011 counted 847 people in 240 households. The 2016 census measured the population of the village as 841 people in 249 households.
