= Lazir, Iran =

Lazir لزير
- Village
- Location within Iran
- Coordinates: 36°24′22″N 51°55′52″E
- Country: Iran
- Province: Mazandaran
- County: Nur
- Bakhsh: Central
- Rural District: Mian Band

Population (2006)
  - Total: 99
- Time zone: UTC+3:30 (IRST)
  - Summer (DST): UTC+4:30 (IRDT)

Lazir (Persian: لزير, also Romanized as Lazīr; also known as Larīr) is a village in Mian Band Rural District, in the Central District of Nur County, Mazandaran Province, Iran. At the 2006 census, its population was 99, in 26 families.
