= Abbasa =

Abbasa may refer to:

- Abbasa, Iran, a village in northern Iran
- Abbasa bint al-Mahdi, 8th-century Abbasid princess
- Abbasa bint Sulayman, the daughter of Abbasid prince Sulayman and wife of Abbasid caliph Harun al-Rashid (r. 786–809)
