= Kalaj =

Kalaj كالج
- Village
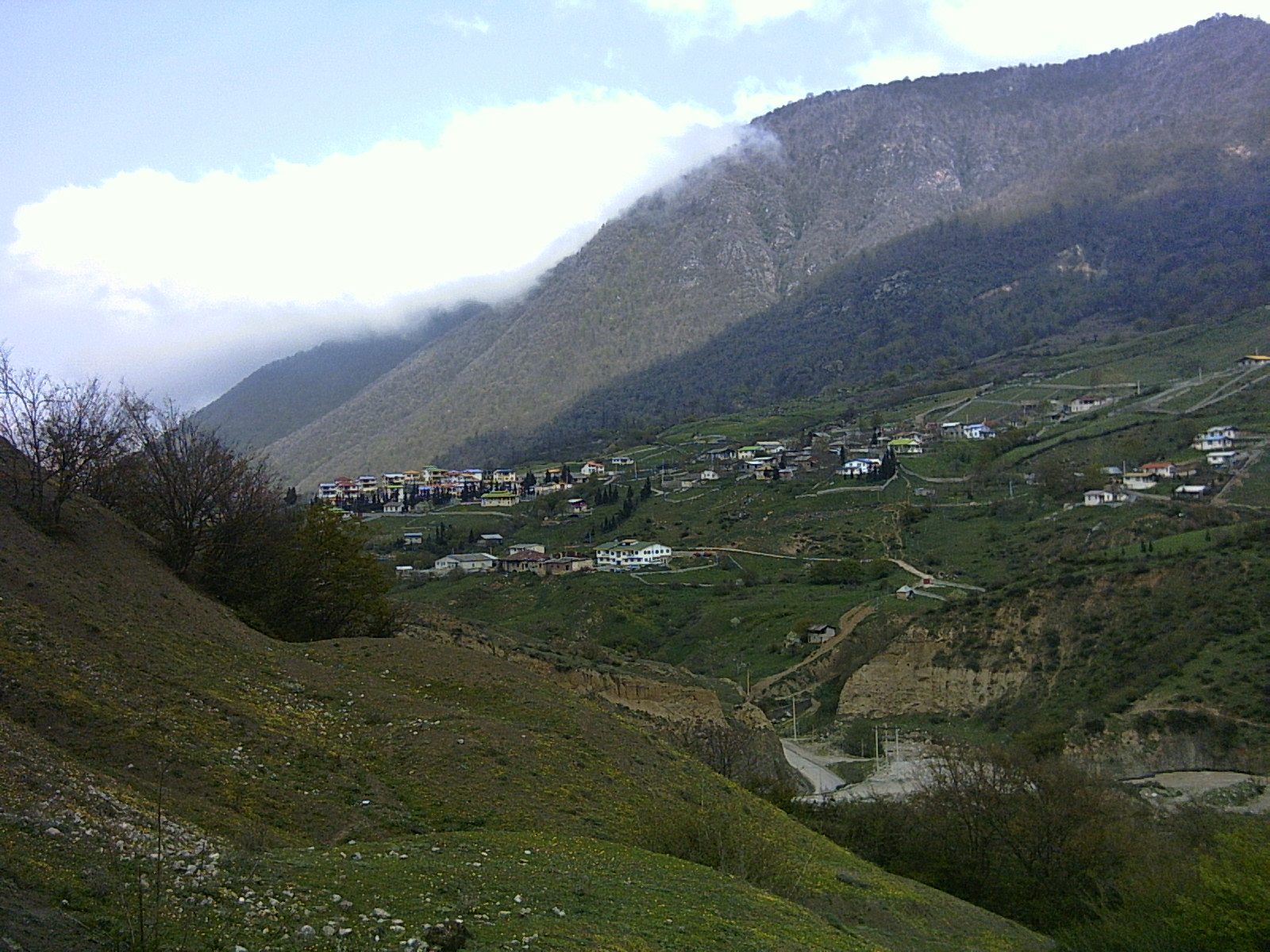

- Location within Iran
- Coordinates: 36°21′14″N 51°52′02″E
- Country: Iran
- Province: Mazandaran
- County: Nur
- Bakhsh: Central
- Rural District: Mian Band

Population (2006)
  - Total: 53
- Time zone: UTC+3:30 (IRST)

Kalaj (Persian: كالج, also Romanized as Kālaj; also known as Kālach and Kelaj) is a village in Mian Band Rural District, in the Central District of Nur County, Mazandaran Province, Iran. At the 2006 census, its population was 53, in 16 families. At the 2016 census, its recorded population was 0.
