= Siah Kola, Nur =

Village in Mazandaran province, Iran

Siah Kola Persian: سياه كلا
- Village
- Location within Iran
- Coordinates: 36°32′25″N 52°06′29″E
- Country: Iran
- Province: Mazandaran
- County: Nur
- District: Central
- Rural District: Natel Kenar-e Sofla

Population (2016)
  - Total: 418
- Time zone: UTC+3:30 (IRST)

Siah Kola (Persian: سياه كلا) (Note: Also romanized as Sīāh Kolā and Sīyah Kalā) is a village in Natel Kenar-e Sofla Rural District of the Central District in Nur County, Mazandaran province, Iran.

== Demographics ==
=== Population ===
At the time of the 2006 National Census, the village's population was 419 in 105 households. The following census in 2011 counted 397 people in 120 households. The 2016 census measured the population of the village as 418 people in 144 households.
