= Kasegar Mahalleh =

Kasegar Mahalleh or Kas Gar Mahalleh (Persian: كاسگرمحله) may refer to:

- Kasegar Mahalleh, Babolsar
- Kasegar Mahalleh, Nur

== See also ==
- Kaseh Gar Mahalleh
