= Hoseynabad, Nur =

Village in Mazandaran province, Iran

Hoseynabad Persian: حسين اباد
- Village
- Location within Iran
- Coordinates: 36°33′23″N 51°57′02″E
- Country: Iran
- Province: Mazandaran
- County: Nur
- District: Central
- Rural District: Mian Band

Population (2016)
  - Total: 1,395
- Time zone: UTC+3:30 (IRST)

Hoseynabad (Persian: حسين اباد) (Note: Also romanized as Ḩoseynābād) is a village in Mian Band Rural District of the Central District in Nur County, Mazandaran province, Iran.

== Demographics ==
=== Population ===
At the time of the 2006 National Census, the village's population was 1,079 in 268 households. The following census in 2011 counted 1,230 people in 353 households. The 2016 census measured the population of the village as 1,395 people in 431 households.
