= Tirak Deh-e Olya =

Village in Mazandaran, Iran

Tirak Deh-e Olya تيركده عليا
- Village
- Location within Iran
- Coordinates: 36°32′49″N 51°56′13″E
- Country: Iran
- Province: Mazandaran
- County: Nur
- Bakhsh: Central
- Rural District: Mian Band

Population (2006)
  - Total: 426
- Time zone: UTC+3:30 (IRST)
  - Summer (DST): UTC+4:30 (IRDT)

Tirak Deh-e Olya (Persian: تيركده عليا, also Romanized as Tīrak Deh-e ‘Olyā; also known as Nīrak Deh-e Bālā and Tīryak Deh-e Bālā) is a village in Mian Band Rural District, in the Central District of Nur County, Mazandaran Province, Iran. At the 2006 census, its population was 426, in 99 families.
