= Khvoriyeh =

Village in Mazandaran province, Iran

Khvoriyeh Persian: خوريه
- Village
- Location within Iran
- Coordinates: 36°30′34″N 52°01′11″E
- Country: Iran
- Province: Mazandaran
- County: Nur
- District: Central
- Rural District: Natel Kenar-e Olya

Population (2016)
  - Total: 846
- Time zone: UTC+3:30 (IRST)

Khvoriyeh (Persian: خوريه) (Note: Also romanized as Khowrīyeh, Khūrīyeh, and Khvorīyeh) is a village in Natel Kenar-e Olya Rural District of the Central District in Nur County, Mazandaran province, Iran.

== Demographics ==
=== Population ===
At the time of the 2006 National Census, the village's population was 677 in 166 households. The following census in 2011 counted 762 people in 234 households. The 2016 census measured the population of the village as 846 people in 274 households.
