= Shahr Kola =

Village in Mazandaran province, Iran

Shahr Kola Persian: شهركلا
- Village
- Location within Iran
- Coordinates: 36°32′40″N 52°00′02″E
- Country: Iran
- Province: Mazandaran
- County: Nur
- District: Central
- Rural District: Natel Kenar-e Olya

Population (2016)
  - Total: 1,367
- Time zone: UTC+3:30 (IRST)

Shahr Kola (Persian: شهركلا) (Note: Also romanized as Shahr Kolā) is a village in Natel Kenar-e Olya Rural District of the Central District in Nur County, Mazandaran province, Iran.

== Demographics ==
=== Population ===
At the time of the 2006 National Census, the village's population was 1,025 in 240 households. The following census in 2011 counted 1,194 people in 320 households. The 2016 census measured the population of the village as 1,367 people in 419 households.
