= Ganj-e Yab-e Pain =

Village in Mazandaran province, Iran

Ganj-e Yab-e Pain Persian: گنج ياب پايين
- Village
- Location within Iran
- Coordinates: 36°32′19″N 52°02′07″E
- Country: Iran
- Province: Mazandaran
- County: Nur
- District: Central
- Rural District: Natel Kenar-e Olya

Population (2016)
  - Total: 1,381
- Time zone: UTC+3:30 (IRST)

Ganj-e Yab-e Pain (Persian: گنج ياب پايين) (Note: Also romanized as Ganj-e Yāb-e Pā’īn; formerly known as Gandyab-e Pain (گندياب پائين), also romanized as Gandyāb-e Pā’īn) is a village in Natel Kenar-e Olya Rural District of the Central District in Nur County, Mazandaran province, Iran.

== Demographics ==
=== Population ===
At the time of the 2006 National Census, the village's population, as Gandyab-e Pain, was 745 in 181 households. The following census in 2011 counted 889 people in 241 households. The 2016 census measured the population of the village as 1,381 people in 414 households, by which time the village was listed as Ganj-e Yab-e Pain.
