= Izadshahr =

City in Mazandaran province, Iran

Izadshahr Persian: ايزدشهر
- City
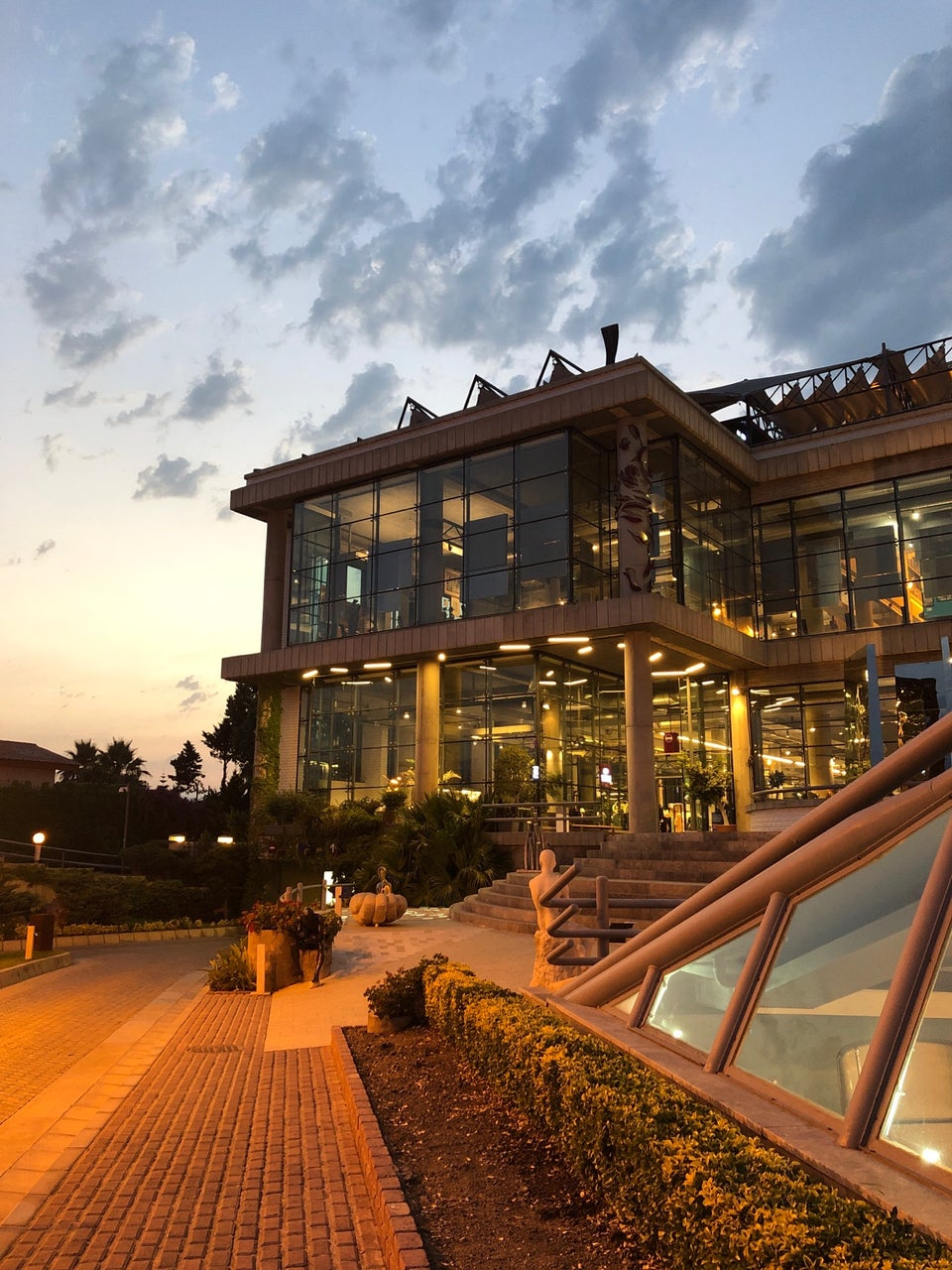
- Didi Gallery Museum in central Izadshahr

- Location within Iran
- Coordinates: 36°35′54″N 52°08′06″E
- Country: Iran
- Province: Mazandaran
- County: Nur
- District: Central
- Established as a city: 2005

Population (2016)
  - Total: 7,439
- Time zone: UTC+3:30 (IRST)

Izadshahr (Persian: ايزدشهر) (Note: Formerly the village of Izdeh-e Bazarsar (ایزده بازارسر), also romanized as Īzdeh-e Bāzārsar; also known as ‘Īz Deh, Iz-e-Deh, Izdeh, Īzdeh, and Izedeh) is a city in the Central District of Nur County, Mazandaran province, Iran, serving as the administrative center for Natel Kenar-e Sofla Rural District. It is on the Caspian Sea. The villages of Izdeh-e Bazarsar (ایزده بازار سر) was merged with the villages of Izdeh-e Siraj Mahalleh (ایزده سراج محله) and Amirabad-e Kenareh (امیرآباد کناره) to become the city of Izadshahr in 2005.

== Demographics ==
=== Population ===
At the time of the 2006 National Census, the city's population was 6,882 in 1,923 households. The following census in 2011 counted 6,797 people in 2,065 households. The 2016 census measured the population of the city as 7,439 people in 2,514 households.
