= Kardgar Kola, Nur =

Village in Mazandaran province, Iran

Kardgar Kola Persian: كارد گركلا
- Village
- Location within Iran
- Coordinates: 36°30′47″N 52°03′46″E
- Country: Iran
- Province: Mazandaran
- County: Nur
- District: Central
- Rural District: Natel Kenar-e Olya

Population (2016)
  - Total: 746
- Time zone: UTC+3:30 (IRST)

Kardgar Kola (Persian: كارد گركلا) (Note: Also romanized as Kārdgar Kolā; also known as Kārgard Kolā) is a village in Natel Kenar-e Olya Rural District of the Central District in Nur County, Mazandaran province, Iran.

== Demographics ==
=== Population ===
At the time of the 2006 National Census, the village's population was 636 in 145 households. The following census in 2011 counted 729 people in 210 households. The 2016 census measured the population of the village as 746 people in 238 households.
