= Bərcan =

- Municipality
- Location within Azerbaijan
- Coordinates: 39°01′15″N 48°24′00″E
- Country: Azerbaijan
- Rayon: Yardymli

Population
  - Total: 200
- Time zone: UTC+4 (AZT)
  - Summer (DST): UTC+5 (AZT)

Bərcan (also, Bardzhan and Byardzhan) is a village and municipality in the Yardymli Rayon of Azerbaijan. It has a population of 200. The municipality consists of the villages of Bərcan and Ləzir.
