= Abbasa, Iran =

Village in Mazandaran province, Iran

Abbasa Persian: عباسا
- Village
- Location within Iran
- Coordinates: 36°32′52″N 51°59′25″E
- Country: Iran
- Province: Mazandaran
- County: Nur
- District: Central
- Rural District: Natel Kenar-e Olya

Population (2016)
  - Total: 2,685
- Time zone: UTC+3:30 (IRST)

Abbasa (Persian: عباسا) (Note: Also romanized as ‘Abbāsā) is a village in Natel Kenar-e Olya Rural District of the Central District in Nur County, Mazandaran province, Iran.

== Demographics ==
=== Population ===
At the time of the 2006 National Census, the village's population was 2,380 in 562 households. The following census in 2011 counted 2,553 people in 711 households. The 2016 census measured the population of the village as 2,685 people in 813 households, the most populous in its rural district.
