= Afrasiab Kola, Nur =

Village in Mazandaran province, Iran

Afrasiab Kola Persian: افراسياب كلا
- Village
- Location within Iran
- Coordinates: 36°32′12″N 52°03′32″E
- Country: Iran
- Province: Mazandaran
- County: Nur
- District: Central
- Rural District: Natel Kenar-e Olya

Population (2016)
  - Total: 558
- Time zone: UTC+3:30 (IRST)

Afrasiab Kola (Persian: افراسياب كلا) (Note: Also romanized as Afrāsīāb Kolā) is a village in Natel Kenar-e Olya Rural District of the Central District in Nur County, Mazandaran province, Iran.

== Demographics ==
=== Population ===
At the time of the 2006 National Census, the village's population was 497 in 127 households. The following census in 2011 counted 546 people in 161 households. The 2016 census measured the population of the village as 558 people in 188 households.
