= Kasegar Mahalleh, Nur =

Village in Mazandaran province, Iran

Kasegar Mahalleh Persian: كاسگرمحله
- Village
- Location within Iran
- Coordinates: 36°32′14″N 51°56′37″E
- Country: Iran
- Province: Mazandaran
- County: Nur
- District: Central
- Rural District: Mian Band

Population (2016)
  - Total: 1,484
- Time zone: UTC+3:30 (IRST)

Kasegar Mahalleh (Persian: كاسگرمحله) (Note: Also romanized as Kāsegar Mahalleh; also known as Kāseh Gar Maḩalleh) is a village in, and the capital of, Mian Band Rural District in the Central District of Nur County, Mazandaran province, Iran.

== Demographics ==
=== Population ===
At the time of the 2006 National Census, the village's population was 1,121 in 251 households. The following census in 2011 counted 1,311 people in 342 households. The 2016 census measured the population of the village as 1,484 people in 466 households, the most populous in its rural district.
