= Ganj-e Yab-e Bala =

Village in Mazandaran province, Iran

Ganj-e Yab-e Bala Persian: گنج ياب بالا
- Village
- Location within Iran
- Coordinates: 36°31′52″N 52°02′23″E
- Country: Iran
- Province: Mazandaran
- County: Nur
- District: Central
- Rural District: Natel Kenar-e Olya

Population (2016)
  - Total: 549
- Time zone: UTC+3:30 (IRST)

Ganj-e Yab-e Bala (Persian: گنج ياب بالا) (Note: Also romanized as Ganj-e Yāb-e Bālā; formerly known as Gandyab-e Bala (گندياب بالا), also romanized as Gandyāb-e Bālā; also known as Gandyāb) is a village in Natel Kenar-e Olya Rural District of the Central District in Nur County, Mazandaran province, Iran.

== Demographics ==
=== Population ===
At the time of the 2006 National Census, the village's population, as Gandyab-e Bala, was 347 in 86 households. The following census in 2011 counted 353 people in 105 households. The 2016 census measured the population of the village as 549 people in 177 households, by which time the village was listed as Ganj-e Yab-e Bala.
