= Tashkuh-e Olya =

Village in Mazandaran province, Iran

Tashkuh-e Olya Persian: تاشكوه عليا
- Village
- Location within Iran
- Coordinates: 36°32′41″N 51°57′10″E
- Country: Iran
- Province: Mazandaran
- County: Nur
- District: Central
- Rural District: Mian Band

Population (2016)
  - Total: 1,266
- Time zone: UTC+3:30 (IRST)

Tashkuh-e Olya (Persian: تاشكوه عليا) (Note: Also romanized as Tāshkūh-e ‘Olyā) is a village in Mian Band Rural District of the Central District in Nur County, Mazandaran province, Iran.

== Demographics ==
=== Population ===
At the time of the 2006 National Census, the village's population was 1,481 in 349 households. The following census in 2011 counted 1,333 people in 362 households. The 2016 census measured the population of the village as 1,266 people in 389 households.
