= Tashkuh-e Sofla =

Village in Mazandaran province, Iran

Tashkuh-e Sofla Persian: تاشكوه سفلي
- Village
- Location within Iran
- Coordinates: 36°33′08″N 51°57′19″E
- Country: Iran
- Province: Mazandaran
- County: Nur
- District: Central
- Rural District: Mian Band

Population (2016)
  - Total: 1,086
- Time zone: UTC+3:30 (IRST)

Tashkuh-e Sofla (Persian: تاشكوه سفلي) (Note: Also romanized as Tāshkūh-e Soflá) is a village in Mian Band Rural District of the Central District in Nur County, Mazandaran province, Iran.

== Demographics ==
=== Population ===
At the time of the 2006 National Census, the village's population was 988 in 241 households. The following census in 2011 counted 1,263 people in 372 households. The 2016 census measured the population of the village as 1,086 people in 328 households.
