= Tashkuh-e Vosta =

Village in Mazandaran province, Iran

Tashkuh-e Vosta Persian: تاشكوه وسطي
- Village
- Location within Iran
- Coordinates: 36°32′57″N 51°57′18″E
- Country: Iran
- Province: Mazandaran
- County: Nur
- District: Central
- Rural District: Mian Band

Population (2016)
  - Total: 612
- Time zone: UTC+3:30 (IRST)

Tashkuh-e Vosta (Persian: تاشكوه وسطي) (Note: Also romanized as Tāshkūh-e Vosţá) is a village in Mian Band Rural District of the Central District in Nur County, Mazandaran province, Iran.

== Demographics ==
=== Population ===
At the time of the 2006 National Census, the village's population was 476 in 114 households. The following census in 2011 counted 575 people in 153 households. The 2016 census measured the population of the village as 612 people in 180 households.
