= Kardgar Kola, Babol =

Kardar Kola كاردركلا
- Village
- Location within Iran
- Coordinates: 36°18′27″N 52°45′40″E
- Country: Iran
- Province: Mazandaran
- County: Babol
- Bakhsh: Bandpey-ye Gharbi
- Rural District: Khvosh Rud

Population (2006)
  - Total: 190
- Time zone: UTC+3:30 (IRST)
  - Summer (DST): UTC+4:30 (IRDT)

Kardar Kola (Persian: كاردركلا, also Romanized as Kārdar Kolā and Kārdar Kalā) is a village in Khvosh Rud Rural District, Bandpey-ye Gharbi District, Babol County, Mazandaran Province, Iran. At the 2006 census, its population was 190, in 57 families.
