= Dhivehi =

Dhivehi or Divehi may refer to:

- Dhivehi language, an Indo-Aryan language spoken by about 500,000 people predominantly in the Republic of Maldives
  - Dhivehi script, any of the Maldivian writing systems
- Dhivehi people, an ethnic group native to region of the Republic of Maldives
