= Natel Kenar-e Sofla Rural District =

Rural district in Mazandaran province, Iran

Natel Kenar-e Sofla Rural District Persian: دهستان ناتل كنار سفلي
- Rural District
- Location within Iran
- Coordinates: 36°35′N 52°07′E
- Country: Iran
- Province: Mazandaran
- County: Nur
- District: Central
- Established: 1987
- Capital: Izadshahr

Population (2016)
  - Total: 3,091
- Time zone: UTC+3:30 (IRST)

Natel Kenar-e Sofla Rural District (Persian: دهستان ناتل كنار سفلي) is in the Central District of Nur County, Mazandaran province, Iran. It is administered from the city of Izadshahr. (Note: Formerly the village of Izdeh-e Bazarsar)

== Demographics ==
=== Population ===
At the time of the 2006 National Census, the rural district's population was 2,975 in 818 households. There were 3,161 inhabitants in 977 households at the following census of 2011. The 2016 census measured the population of the rural district as 3,091 in 1,011 households. The most populous of its two town was Rostam Rud, with 2,673 people.

=== Other villages in the rural district ===
- Siah Kola
