= Afrasiab Kola, Babol =

Afrasiab Kola افراسياب كلا
- Village
- Location within Iran
- Coordinates: 36°22′04″N 52°34′13″E
- Country: Iran
- Province: Mazandaran
- County: Babol
- Bakhsh: Bandpey-ye Gharbi
- Rural District: Khvosh Rud

Population (2006)
  - Total: 174
- Time zone: UTC+3:30 (IRST)
  - Summer (DST): UTC+4:30 (IRDT)

Afrasiab Kola (Persian: افراسياب كلا, also Romanized as Afrāsīāb Kolā) is a village in Khvosh Rud Rural District, Bandpey-ye Gharbi District, Babol County, Mazandaran Province, Iran. At the 2006 census, its population was 174, in 55 families.
