= Natel Kenar-e Olya Rural District =

Rural district in Mazandaran province, Iran

Natel Kenar-e Olya Rural District Persian: دهستان ناتل كنار عليا
- Rural District
- Location within Iran
- Coordinates: 36°31′N 52°01′E
- Country: Iran
- Province: Mazandaran
- County: Nur
- District: Central
- Established: 1987
- Capital: Salyakoti

Population (2016)
  - Total: 13,328
- Time zone: UTC+3:30 (IRST)

Natel Kenar-e Olya Rural District (Persian: دهستان ناتل كنار عليا) is in the Central District of Nur County, Mazandaran province, Iran. Its capital is the village of Salyakoti.

== Demographics ==
=== Population ===
At the time of the 2006 National Census, the rural district's population was 10,809 in 2,591 households. There were 11,524 inhabitants in 3,261 households at the following census of 2011. The 2016 census measured the population of the rural district as 13,328 in 4,157 households. The most populous of its 24 villages was Abbasa, with 2,685 people.

=== Other villages in the rural district ===
- Afrasiab Kola
- Ganj-e Yab-e Bala
- Ganj-e Yab-e Pain
- Kardgar Kola
- Khvoriyeh
- Sar Kaj
- Shahr Kola
