= Mian Band Rural District =

Rural district in Mazandaran province, Iran

Mian Band Rural District Persian: دهستان ميان بند
- Rural District
- Location within Iran
- Coordinates: 36°25′N 51°55′E
- Country: Iran
- Province: Mazandaran
- County: Nur
- District: Central
- Established: 1987
- Capital: Kasegar Mahalleh

Population (2016)
  - Total: 11,065
- Time zone: UTC+3:30 (IRST)

Mian Band Rural District (Persian: دهستان ميان بند) is in the Central District of Nur County, Mazandaran province, Iran. Its capital is the village of Kasegar Mahalleh.

== Demographics ==
=== Population ===
At the time of the 2006 National Census, the rural district's population was 8,719 in 2,138 households. There were 9,935 inhabitants in 2,830 households at the following census of 2011. The 2016 census measured the population of the rural district as 11,065 in 3,477 households. The most populous of its 37 villages was Kasegar Mahalleh, with 1,484 people.

=== Other villages in the rural district ===
- Hoseynabad
- Tashkuh-e Olya
- Tashkuh-e Sofla
- Tashkuh-e Vosta
- Tuska
- Zarrin Kola
