= Central District (Nur County) =

District in Mazandaran province, Iran

Central District (Nur County) Persian: بخش مرکزی شهرستان نور
- District
- Location within Iran
- Coordinates: 36°26′N 52°00′E
- Country: Iran
- Province: Mazandaran
- County: Nur
- Capital: Nur

Population (2016)
  - Total: 69,601
- Time zone: UTC+3:30 (IRST)

The Central District of Nur County (Persian: بخش مرکزی شهرستان نور) is in Mazandaran province, Iran. Its capital is the city of Nur.

== Demographics ==
=== Population ===
At the time of the 2006 National Census, the district's population was 57,530 in 15,342 households. The following census in 2011 counted 61,497 people in 18,029 households. The 2016 census measured the population of the district as 69,601 inhabitants in 22,217 households.

=== Administrative divisions ===
Central District (Nur County) Population
Administrative Divisions	2006	2011	2016
Mian Band RD	8,719	9,935	11,065
Natel Kenar-e Olya RD	10,809	11,524	13,328
Natel Kenar-e Sofla RD	2,975	3,161	3,091
Izadshahr (city)	6,882	6,797	7,439
Nur (city)	21,806	22,978	26,947
Ruyan (city)	6,339	7,102	7,731
Total	57,530	61,497	69,601
RD = Rural District
