= Qaleh Koti, Nur =

Qaleh Koti قلعه كتي
- Village
- Location within Iran
- Coordinates: 36°27′42″N 52°11′06″E
- Country: Iran
- Province: Mazandaran
- County: Nur
- Bakhsh: Chamestan
- Rural District: Mianrud

Population (2006)
  - Total: 242
- Time zone: UTC+3:30 (IRST)
  - Summer (DST): UTC+4:30 (IRDT)

Qaleh Koti (Persian: قلعه كتي, also Romanized as Qal‘eh Kotī; also known as Qalā Kotī) is a village in Mianrud Rural District, Chamestan District, Nur County, Mazandaran Province, Iran. At the 2006 census, its population was 242, in 61 families.
