= Rudbarak, Mazandaran =

Rudbarak رودبارک
- Village
- Location within Iran
- Coordinates: 36°15′39″N 52°04′24″E
- Country: Iran
- Province: Mazandaran
- County: Nur
- Bakhsh: Chamestan
- Rural District: Natel-e Restaq

Population (2016)
  - Total: 28
- Time zone: UTC+3:30 (IRST)

Rudbarak (Persian: رودبارک, also Romanized as Rūdbārak) is a village in Natel-e Restaq Rural District, Chamestan District, Nur County, Mazandaran Province, Iran.

At the time of the 2006 National Census, the village's population was 25 in 12 households. The following census in 2011 counted 17 people in 9 households. The 2016 census measured the population of the village as 28 people in 15 households.
