= Anna Deh =

Anna Deh اناده
- Village
- Location within Iran
- Coordinates: 36°31′28″N 52°08′36″E
- Country: Iran
- Province: Mazandaran
- County: Nur
- Bakhsh: Chamestan
- Rural District: Natel-e Restaq

Population (2006)
  - Total: 415
- Time zone: UTC+3:30 (IRST)
  - Summer (DST): UTC+4:30 (IRDT)

Anna Deh (Persian: اناده, also Romanized as Annā Deh) is a village in Natel-e Restaq Rural District, Chamestan District, Nur County, Mazandaran Province, Iran. At the 2006 census, its population was 415, in 100 families.
