= Turan Kola =

Tireng Kola تیرنگ كلا توران کلا
- Village
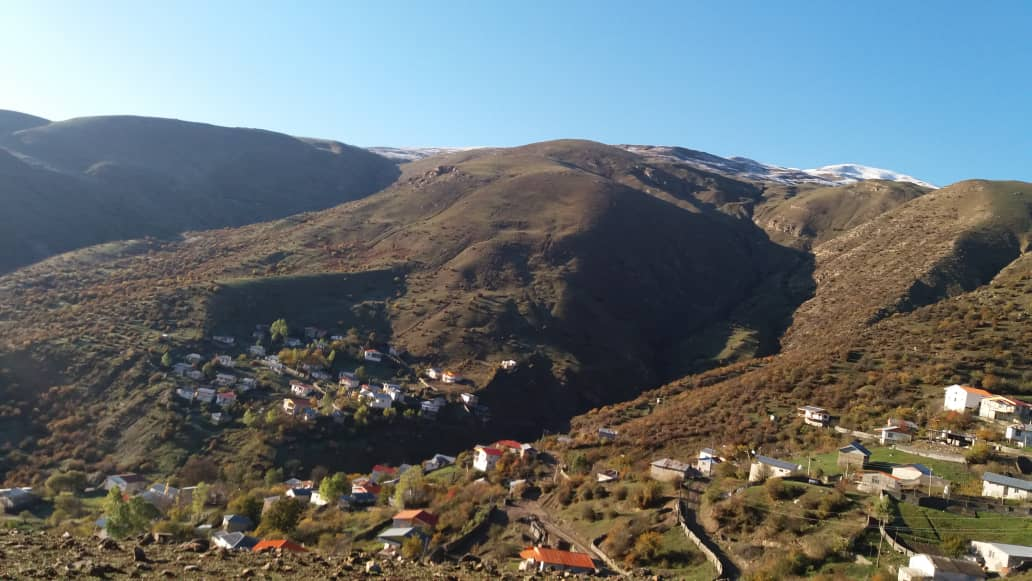

- Location within Iran
- Coordinates: 36°28′23″N 52°11′59″E
- Country: Iran
- Province: Mazandaran
- County: Nur
- Bakhsh: Chamestan
- Rural District: Mianrud

Population (2016)
  - Total: 406
- Time zone: UTC+3:30 (IRST)

Tireng Kola (Persian: تیرنگ كلا, also Romanized as Trin Kelā and Tarvan Kolā) is a village in Mianrud Rural District of Chamestan District, Nur County in Mazandaran Province, Iran. At the 2016 census, its population was 406, in 124 families.
