= Kenespa =

Kenespa كنس پا
- Village
- Location within Iran
- Coordinates: 36°27′43″N 52°13′11″E
- Country: Iran
- Province: Mazandaran
- County: Nur
- Bakhsh: Chamestan
- Rural District: Mianrud

Population (2006)
  - Total: 131
- Time zone: UTC+3:30 (IRST)
  - Summer (DST): UTC+4:30 (IRDT)

Kenespa (Persian: كنس پا, also Romanized as Kenespā) is a village in Mianrud Rural District, Chamestan District, Nur County, Mazandaran Province, Iran. At the 2006 census, its population was 131, in 29 families.
