= Rameshi =

Rameshi رمشي
- Village
- Location within Iran
- Coordinates: 36°28′36″N 52°11′08″E
- Country: Iran
- Province: Mazandaran
- County: Nur
- Bakhsh: Chamestan
- Rural District: Mianrud

Population (2006)
  - Total: 210
- Time zone: UTC+3:30 (IRST)
  - Summer (DST): UTC+4:30 (IRDT)

Rameshi (Persian: رمشي, also Romanized as Rameshī; also known as Rameh Shīr) is a village in Mianrud Rural District, Chamestan District, Nur County, Mazandaran Province, Iran. At the 2006 census, its population was 210, in 55 families.
