= Valirkan =

Valirkan وليركان
- Village
- Location within Iran
- Coordinates: 36°26′42″N 52°14′59″E
- Country: Iran
- Province: Mazandaran
- County: Nur
- Bakhsh: Chamestan
- Rural District: Mianrud

Population (2006)
  - Total: 250
- Time zone: UTC+3:30 (IRST)
  - Summer (DST): UTC+4:30 (IRDT)

Valirkan (Persian: وليركان, also Romanized as Valīrkān) is a village in Mianrud Rural District, Chamestan District, Nur County, Mazandaran Province, Iran. At the 2006 census, its population was 250, in 64 families.
