= Sheykh Ali Kola =

Sheykh Ali Kola شيخ علي كلا
- Village
- Location within Iran
- Coordinates: 36°30′24″N 52°06′24″E
- Country: Iran
- Province: Mazandaran
- County: Nur
- Bakhsh: Chamestan
- Rural District: Natel-e Restaq

Population (2006)
  - Total: 167
- Time zone: UTC+3:30 (IRST)
  - Summer (DST): UTC+4:30 (IRDT)

Sheykh Ali Kola (Persian: شيخ علي كلا, also Romanized as Sheykh ‘Alī Kolā) is a village in Natel-e Restaq Rural District, Chamestan District, Nur County, Mazandaran Province, Iran. At the 2006 census, its population was 167, in 35 families.
