= Marzandeh =

Marzandeh مرزنده
- village
- Location within Iran
- Coordinates: 36°31′41″N 52°09′29″E
- Country: Iran
- Province: Mazandaran
- County: Nur
- Bakhsh: Chamestan
- Rural District: Natel-e Restaq

Population (2016)
  - Total: 276
- Time zone: UTC+3:30 (IRST)
  - Summer (DST): UTC+4:30 (IRDT)

Marzandeh (Persian: مرزنده) is a village in Natel-e Restaq Rural District, Chamestan District, Nur County, Mazandaran Province, Iran. At the 2016 census, its population was 276, in 84 families.

== Population ==
Statistical unit	People
• Household	84
• Population	276
• Male	136
• Female	140

== Gallery ==
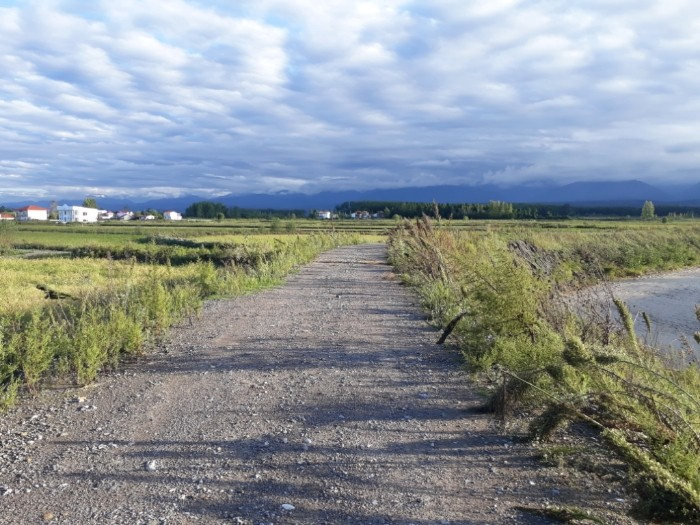
