= Tasbih Kola =

Tasbih Kola تسبيح كلا
- Village
- Location within Iran
- Coordinates: 36°28′00″N 52°13′00″E
- Country: Iran
- Province: Mazandaran
- County: Nur
- Bakhsh: Chamestan
- Rural District: Mianrud

Population (2006)
  - Total: 329
- Time zone: UTC+3:30 (IRST)
  - Summer (DST): UTC+4:30 (IRDT)

Tasbih Kola (Persian: تسبيح كلا, also Romanized as Tasbīḩ Kolā) is a village in Mianrud Rural District, Chamestan District, Nur County, Mazandaran Province, Iran. At the 2006 census, its population was 329, in 75 families.
