= Abbas Kola =

Abbas Kola (Persian: عباس كلا) may refer to:

- Abbas Kola, Babol
- Abbas Kola, Chalus
- Abbas Kola, Nur
