= Belvij =

Belvij بلويج
- Village
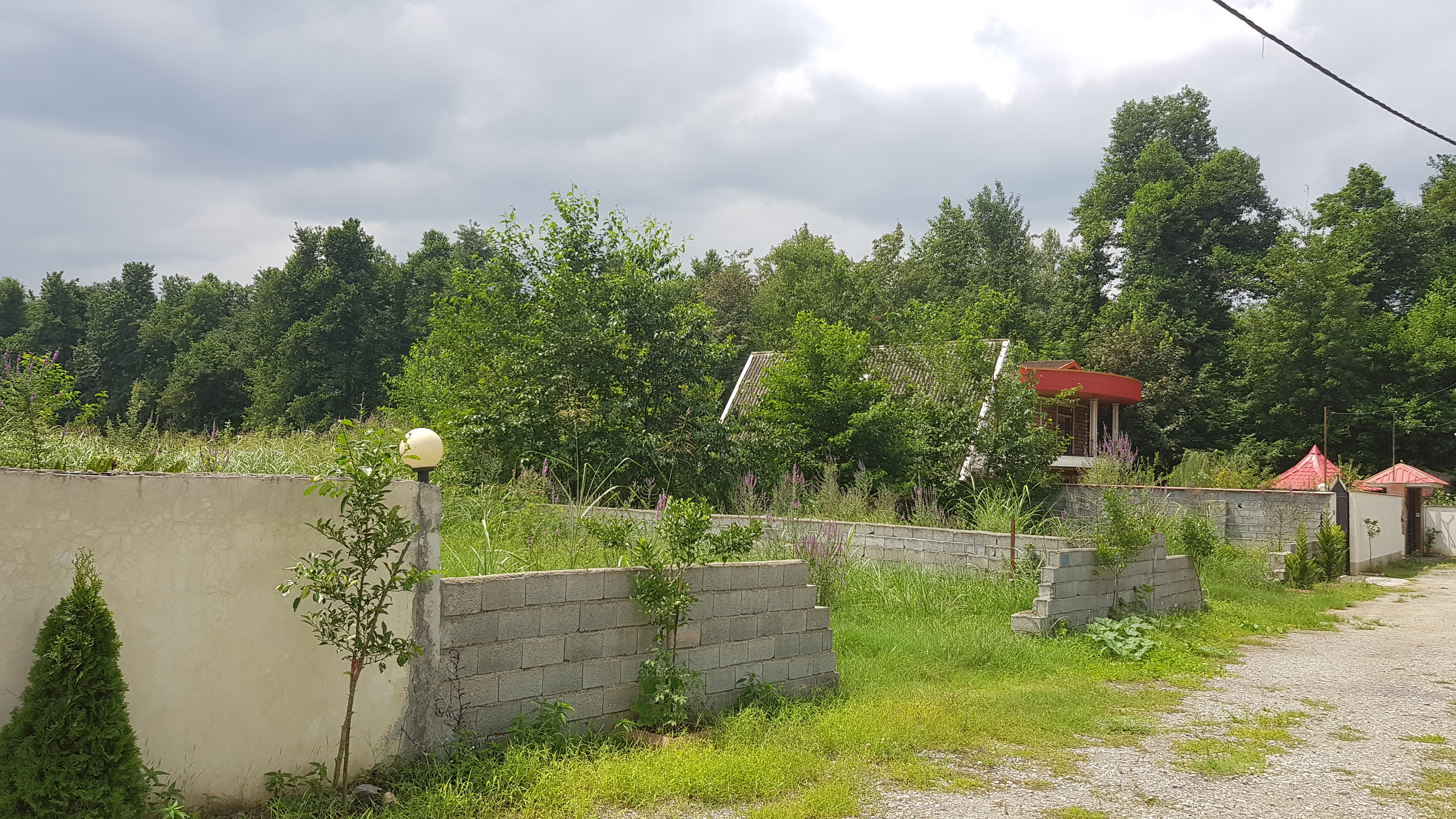

- Location within Iran
- Coordinates: 36°28′25″N 52°10′14″E
- Country: Iran
- Province: Mazandaran
- County: Nur
- Bakhsh: Chamestan
- Rural District: Mianrud

Population (2016)
  - Total: 112
- Time zone: UTC+3:30 (IRST)

Belvij (Persian: بلويج, also Romanized as Belvīj; also known as Belvīch) is a village in Mianrud Rural District, Chamestan District, Nur County, Mazandaran Province, Iran. At the 2006 census, its population was 113, in 30 families. In 2016, its population was 112, in 35 households.

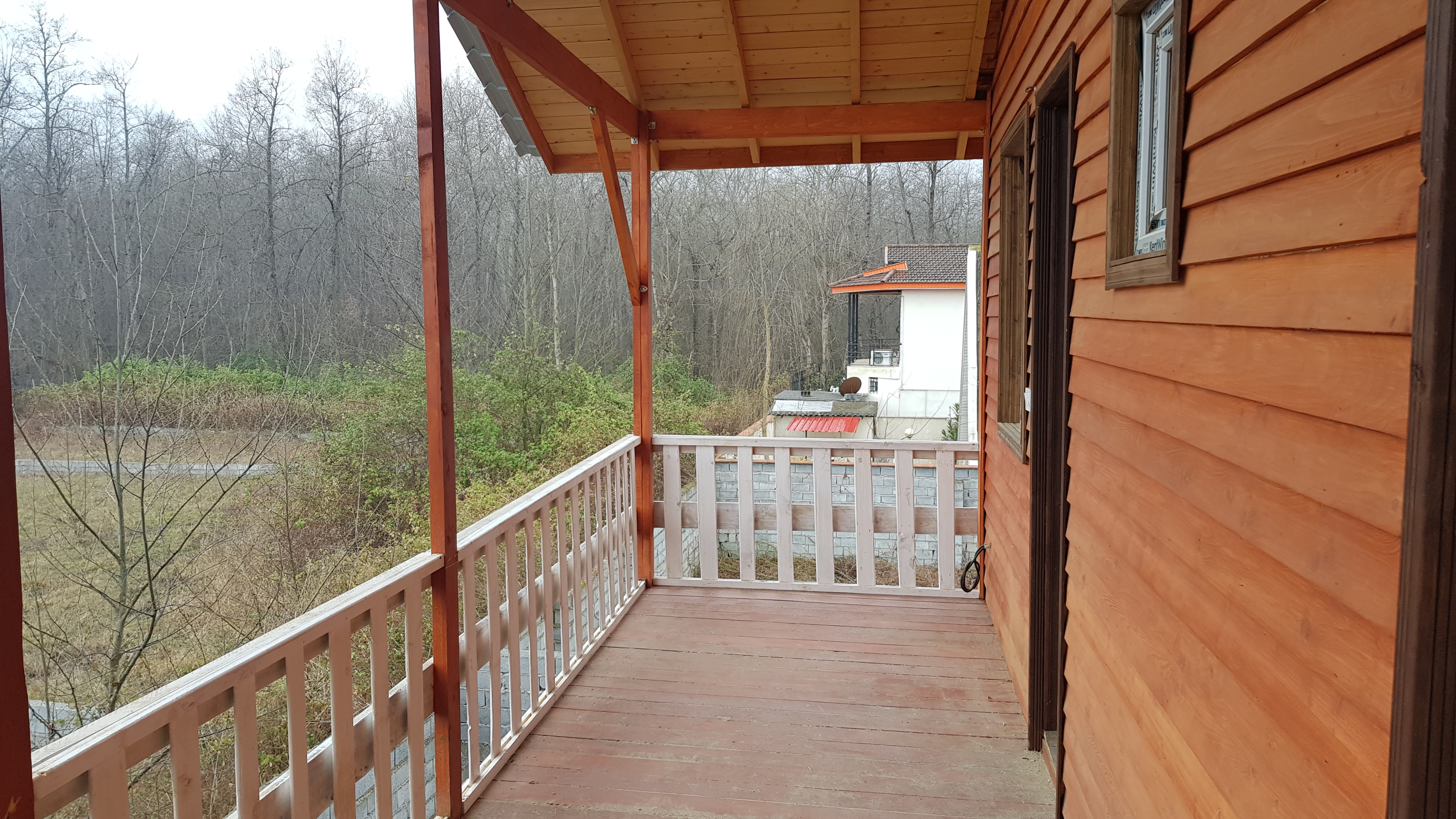
Belvij village, Chamestan, Noor, Mazandaran, Iran
