= Kiab Sar =

Kiab Sar كياب سر
- Village
- Location within Iran
- Coordinates: 36°27′39″N 52°12′44″E
- Country: Iran
- Province: Mazandaran
- County: Nur
- Bakhsh: Chamestan
- Rural District: Mianrud

Population (2006)
  - Total: 225
- Time zone: UTC+3:30 (IRST)
  - Summer (DST): UTC+4:30 (IRDT)

Kiab Sar (Persian: كياب سر, also Romanized as Kīāb Sar; also known as Kīā Besar) is a village in Mianrud Rural District, Chamestan District, Nur County, Mazandaran Province, Iran. At the 2006 census, its population was 225, in 52 families.
