= Buteh Deh =

Buteh Deh بوته ده
- Village
- Location within Iran
- Coordinates: 36°29′05″N 52°13′00″E
- Country: Iran
- Province: Mazandaran
- County: Nur
- Bakhsh: Chamestan
- Rural District: Mianrud

Population (2006)
  - Total: 174
- Time zone: UTC+3:30 (IRST)
  - Summer (DST): UTC+4:30 (IRDT)

Buteh Deh (Persian: بوته ده, also Romanized as Būteh Deh) is a village in Mianrud Rural District, Chamestan District, Nur County, Mazandaran Province, Iran. At the 2006 census, its population was 174, in 43 families.
