= Gazna Sara =

Gazna Sara گزناسرا
- Village
- Location within Iran
- Coordinates: 36°16′52″N 52°11′15″E
- Country: Iran
- Province: Mazandaran
- County: Nur
- Bakhsh: Chamestan
- Rural District: Natel-e Restaq

Population (2006)
  - Total: 19
- Time zone: UTC+3:30 (IRST)
  - Summer (DST): UTC+4:30 (IRDT)

Gazna Sara (Persian: گزناسرا, also romanized as Gaznā Sarā and Geznesera; also known as Kaznā Sarā) is a village in Natel-e Restaq Rural District. It is situated in Chamestan District, Nur County, Mazandaran Province, Iran. At the 2006 census, its population was 19, in 6 families.
