= Angeta Rud-e Pain =

Angeta Rud-e Pain انگتارودپائين
- Village
- Location within Iran
- Coordinates: 36°23′28″N 52°12′33″E
- Country: Iran
- Province: Mazandaran
- County: Nur
- Bakhsh: Chamestan
- Rural District: Mianrud

Population (2006)
  - Total: 420
- Time zone: UTC+3:30 (IRST)
  - Summer (DST): UTC+4:30 (IRDT)

Angeta Rud-e Pain (Persian: انگتارودپائين, also Romanized as Angetā Rūd-e Pā’īn; also known as Angetā Rūd) is a village in Mianrud Rural District, Chamestan District, Nur County, Mazandaran Province, Iran. At the 2006 census, its population was 420, in 88 families.
