= Sang Chalak =

Sang Chalak سنگ چالك
- Village
- Location within Iran
- Coordinates: 36°31′42″N 52°08′03″E
- Country: Iran
- Province: Mazandaran
- County: Nur
- Bakhsh: Chamestan
- Rural District: Natel-e Restaq

Population (2006)
  - Total: 229
- Time zone: UTC+3:30 (IRST)
  - Summer (DST): UTC+4:30 (IRDT)

Sang Chalak (Persian: سنگ چالك, also Romanized as Sang Chālak) is a village in Natel-e Restaq Rural District, Chamestan District, Nur County, Mazandaran Province, Iran. At the 2006 census, its population was 229, in 56 families.
