= Mordab =

Mordab مرداب
- Village
- Location within Iran
- Coordinates: 36°30′36″N 52°05′19″E
- Country: Iran
- Province: Mazandaran
- County: Nur
- Bakhsh: Chamestan
- Rural District: Natel-e Restaq

Population (2006)
  - Total: 469
- Time zone: UTC+3:30 (IRST)
  - Summer (DST): UTC+4:30 (IRDT)

Mordab (Persian: مرداب, also Romanized as Mordāb) is a village in Natel-e Restaq Rural District, Chamestan District, Nur County, Mazandaran Province, Iran. At the 2006 census, its population was 469, in 108 families.
