= Rais Kola, Nur =

Village in Mazandaran province, Iran

Rais Kola Persian: كياكلا
- Village
- Location within Iran
- Coordinates: 36°22′58″N 52°02′05″E
- Country: Iran
- Province: Mazandaran
- County: Nur
- District: Chamestan
- Rural District: Lavij

Population (2016)
  - Total: 456
- Time zone: UTC+3:30 (IRST)

Rais Kola (Persian: رئيس كلا) (Note: Also romanized as Ra’īs Kalā and Ra’īs Kolā) is a village in, and the capital of, Lavij Rural District in Chamestan District of Nur County, Mazandaran province, Iran.

== Demographics ==
=== Population ===
At the time of the 2006 National Census, the village's population was 539 in 120 households. The following census in 2011 counted 540 people in 151 households. The 2016 census measured the population of the village as 456 people in 141 households.
