= Aghuz Koti, Nur =

Village in Mazandaran province, Iran

Aghuz Koti Persian: اغوزكتي
- Village
- Location within Iran
- Coordinates: 36°25′N 52°3′E
- Country: Iran
- Province: Mazandaran
- County: Nur
- District: Chamestan
- Rural District: Lavij

Population (2016)
  - Total: 25
- Time zone: UTC+3:30 (IRST)

Aghuz Koti (Persian: اغوزكتي) (Note: Also romanized as Āghūz Kotī) is a village in Lavij Rural District of Chamestan District in Nur County, Mazandaran province, Iran.

== Demographics ==
=== Population ===
At the time of the 2006 National Census, the village's population was 23 in five households. The following census in 2011 counted 16 people in five households. The 2016 census measured the population of the village as 25 people in 11 households.
