= Vaz-e Tangeh =

Vaz-e Tangeh وازتنگه
- Village
- Country: Iran
- Province: Mazandaran
- County: Nur
- Bakhsh: Chamestan
- Rural District: Natel-e Restaq

Population (2006)
  - Total: 236
- Time zone: UTC+3:30 (IRST)
  - Summer (DST): UTC+4:30 (IRDT)

Vaz-e Tangeh (Persian: وازتنگه, also Romanized as Vāz-e Tangeh) is a village in Natel-e Restaq Rural District, Chamestan District, Nur County, Mazandaran Province, Iran. At the 2006 census, its population was 236, in 60 families.
