= Kerdabad, Mazandaran =

Village in Mazandaran province, Iran

Kerdabad Persian: كرداباد
- Village
- Location within Iran
- Coordinates: 36°29′40″N 52°05′50″E
- Country: Iran
- Province: Mazandaran
- County: Nur
- District: Chamestan
- Rural District: Natel-e Restaq

Population (2016)
  - Total: 1,290
- Time zone: UTC+3:30 (IRST)

Kerdabad (Persian: كرداباد) (Note: Also romanized as Kerdābād) is a village in Natel-e Restaq Rural District of Chamestan District in Nur County, Mazandaran province, Iran.

== Demographics ==
=== Population ===
At the time of the 2006 National Census, the village's population was 1,087 in 292 households. The following census in 2011 counted 1,324 people in 392 households. The 2016 census measured the population of the village as 1,290 people in 409 households.
