= Talebabad =

Talebabad (Persian: طالب اباد) may refer to:

- Talebabad, Gilan
- Talebabad, Khuzestan
- Talebabad, Mazandaran
- Talebabad, Kashmar, Razavi Khorasan Province
- Talebabad, Tehran
- Talebabad, West Azerbaijan
- Talebabad, Yazd
