= Moghan Deh =

Village in Mazandaran province, Iran

Moghan Deh Persian: مغان ده
- Village
- Location within Iran
- Coordinates: 36°32′08″N 52°07′22″E
- Country: Iran
- Province: Mazandaran
- County: Nur
- District: Chamestan
- Rural District: Natel-e Restaq

Population (2016)
  - Total: 722
- Time zone: UTC+3:30 (IRST)

Moghan Deh (Persian: مغان ده) (Note: Also romanized as Moghān Deh) is a village in Natel-e Restaq Rural District of Chamestan District in Nur County, Mazandaran province, Iran.

== Demographics ==
=== Population ===
At the time of the 2006 National Census, the village's population was 629 in 150 households. The following census in 2011 counted 623 people in 187 households. The 2016 census measured the population of the village as 722 people in 227 households.
