= Varazdeh =

Varazdeh (Persian: ورازده) may refer to:

- Varazdeh-e Olya
- Varazdeh-e Sofla
