= Vaz-e Sofla =

Vaz-e Sofla وازسفلي
- village
- Location within Iran
- Coordinates: 36°20′26″N 52°06′32″E
- Country: Iran
- Province: Mazandaran
- County: Nur
- Bakhsh: Chamestan
- Rural District: Natel-e Restaq

Population (2006)
  - Total: 174
- Time zone: UTC+3:30 (IRST)
  - Summer (DST): UTC+4:30 (IRDT)
- ISO 3166 code: IRN

Vaz-e Sofla (Persian: وازسفلي, also Romanized as Vāz-e Soflá; also known as Vāz, Vāz-e Pā’īn, Vāz Pā’īn, and Waz) is a village in Natel-e Restaq Rural District, Chamestan District, Nur County, Mazandaran Province, Iran. At the 2006 census, its population was 174, in 42 families.
