= Saldeh =

Saldeh (Persian: سالده) may refer to:

- Saldeh-e Olya
- Saldeh-e Sofla
