= Narges Koti =

Narges Koti or Narges Kati (Persian: نرگس كتي) may refer to:

- Narges Koti, Babol, a village in Sajjadrud Rural District, Iran
- Narges Kati, Nur, a village in Mianrud Rural District, Iran
