= Masumabad, Nur =

Village in Mazandaran province, Iran

Masumabad Persian: معصوم اباد
- Village
- Location within Iran
- Coordinates: 36°31′34″N 52°13′29″E
- Country: Iran
- Province: Mazandaran
- County: Nur
- District: Chamestan
- Rural District: Mianrud

Population (2016)
  - Total: 728
- Time zone: UTC+3:30 (IRST)

Masumabad (Persian: معصوم اباد) (Note: Also romanized as Ma‘şūmābād) is a village in Mianrud Rural District of Chamestan District in Nur County, Mazandaran province, Iran.

== Demographics ==
=== Population ===
At the time of the 2006 National Census, the village's population was 735 in 191 households. The following census in 2011 counted 752 people in 218 households. The 2016 census measured the population of the village as 728 people in 236 households.
