= Molla Kola, Nur =

Village in Mazandaran province, Iran

Molla Kola Persian: ملاكلا
- Village
- Location within Iran
- Country: Iran
- Province: Mazandaran
- County: Nur
- District: Chamestan
- Rural District: Lavij

Population (2016)
  - Total: 227
- Time zone: UTC+3:30 (IRST)

Molla Kola (Persian: ملاكلا) (Note: Also romanized as Mollā Kolā) is a village in Lavij Rural District of Chamestan District in Nur County, Mazandaran province, Iran.

== Demographics ==
=== Population ===
At the time of the 2006 National Census, the village's population was 203 in 50 households. The following census in 2011 counted 192 people in 60 households. The 2016 census measured the population of the village as 227 people in 69 households.
