= Dizin Kola =

Village in Mazandaran province, Iran

Dizin Kola Persian: ديزنكلا
- Village
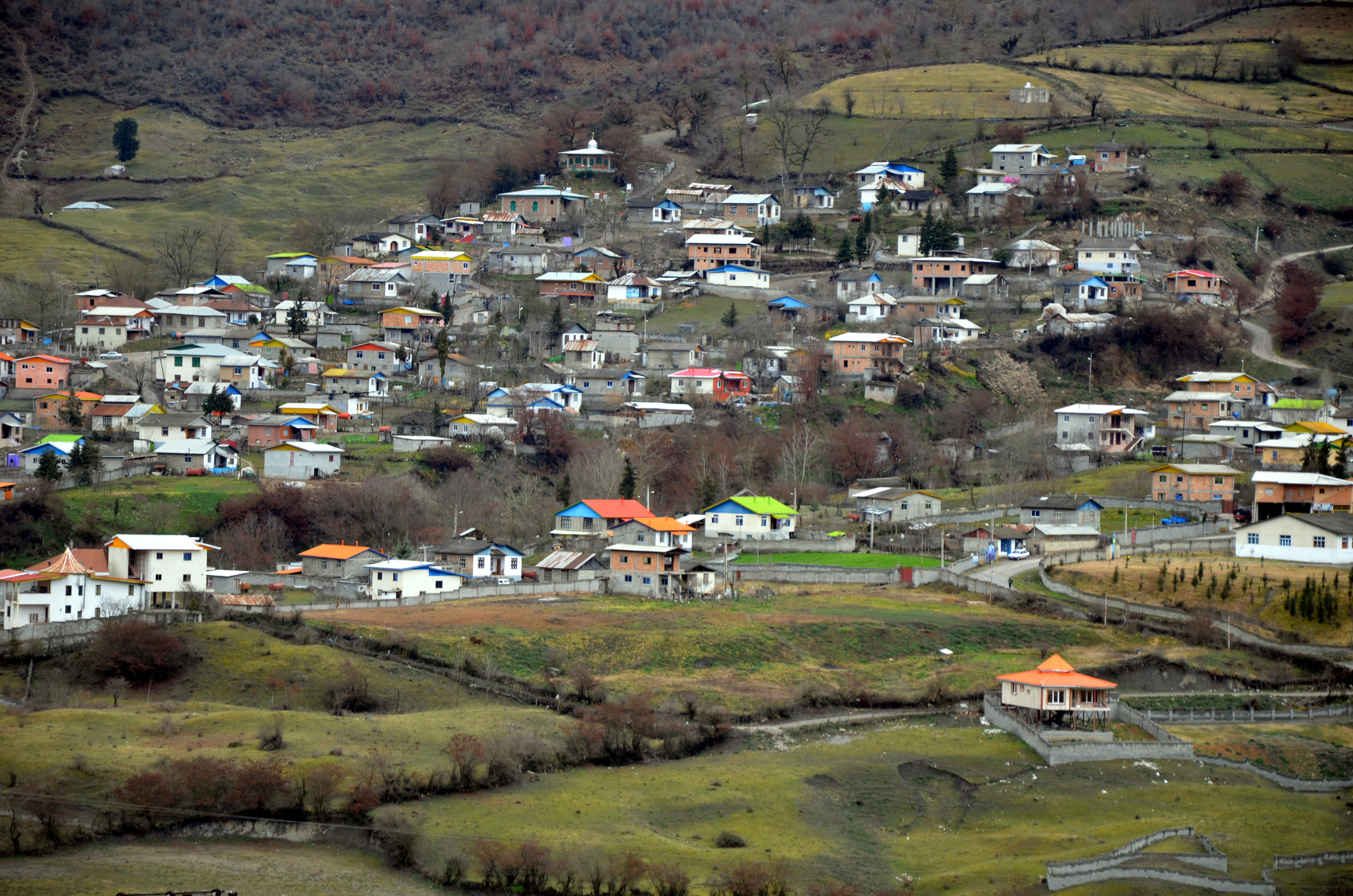
- The village of Dizin Kola

- Location within Iran
- Coordinates: 36°23′23″N 52°02′25″E
- Country: Iran
- Province: Mazandaran
- County: Nur
- District: Chamestan
- Rural District: Lavij

Population (2016)
  - Total: 626
- Time zone: UTC+3:30 (IRST)

Dizin Kola (Persian: ديزنكلا) (Note: Also romanized as Dīzīn Kolā) is a village in Lavij Rural District of Chamestan District in Nur County, Mazandaran province, Iran.

== Demographics ==
=== Population ===
At the time of the 2006 National Census, the village's population was 601 in 127 households. The following census in 2011 counted 587 people in 162 households. The 2016 census measured the population of the village as 626 people in 192 households.
