= Talebabad, Mazandaran =

Talebabad طالب اباد
- Village
- Location within Iran
- Coordinates: 36°31′06″N 52°07′05″E
- Country: Iran
- Province: Mazandaran
- County: Nur
- Bakhsh: Chamestan
- Rural District: Natel-e Restaq

Population (2016)
  - Total: 163
- Time zone: UTC+3:30 (IRST)

Talebabad (Persian: طالب اباد, also Romanized as Ţālebābād) is a village in Natel-e Restaq Rural District, Chamestan District, Nur County, Mazandaran Province, Iran. At the 2006 census, its population was 288, in 66 families. Decreased to 163 people in 56 households in 2016.
