= Molla Mahalleh, Nur =

Village in Mazandaran province, Iran

Molla Mahalleh Persian: ملامحله
- Village
- Location within Iran
- Coordinates: 36°22′51″N 52°02′24″E
- Country: Iran
- Province: Mazandaran
- County: Nur
- District: Chamestan
- Rural District: Lavij

Population (2016)
  - Total: 181
- Time zone: UTC+3:30 (IRST)

Molla Mahalleh (Persian: ملامحله) (Note: Also romanized as Mollā Maḩalleh) is a village in Lavij Rural District of Chamestan District in Nur County, Mazandaran province, Iran.

== Demographics ==
=== Population ===
At the time of the 2006 National Census, the village's population was 155 in 35 households. The following census in 2011 counted 114 people in 31 households. The 2016 census measured the population of the village as 181 people in 58 households.
