= Khvortab-e Rudbar =

Village in Mazandaran province, Iran

Khvortab-e Rudbar Persian: خورتاب رودبار
- Village
- Location within Iran
- Coordinates: 36°18′17″N 51°55′31″E
- Country: Iran
- Province: Mazandaran
- County: Nur
- District: Chamestan
- Rural District: Lavij

Population (2016)
  - Total: 68
- Time zone: UTC+3:30 (IRST)

Khvortab-e Rudbar (Persian: خورتاب رودبار) (Note: Also romanized as Khowrtāb-e Rūdbār and Khvortāb-e Rūdbār; also known as Khortāb Rūd and Khvortāb Rūd) is a village in Lavij Rural District of Chamestan District in Nur County, Mazandaran province, Iran.

== Demographics ==
=== Population ===
At the time of the 2006 National Census, the village's population was 93 in 26 households. The following census in 2011 counted 76 people in 24 households. The 2016 census measured the population of the village as 68 people in 20 households.
