= Narges Koti, Nur =

Narges Koti نرگس كتي
- Village
- Location within Iran
- Coordinates: 36°32′12″N 52°13′04″E
- Country: Iran
- Province: Mazandaran
- County: Nur
- Bakhsh: Chamestan
- Rural District: Mianrud

Population (2006)
  - Total: 97
- Time zone: UTC+3:30 (IRST)
  - Summer (DST): UTC+4:30 (IRDT)

Narges Koti (Persian: نرگس كتي, also Romanized as Narges Kati, Narges Katī and Narges Kotī) is a village in Mianrud Rural District, Chamestan District, Nur County, Mazandaran Province, Iran. At the 2006 census, its population was 97, in 23 families.
