= Karat Koti =

Village in Mazandaran province, Iran

Karat Koti Persian: كرات كتي
- Village
- Location within Iran
- Coordinates: 36°29′34″N 52°08′53″E
- Country: Iran
- Province: Mazandaran
- County: Nur
- District: Chamestan
- Rural District: Natel-e Restaq

Population (2016)
  - Total: 712
- Time zone: UTC+3:30 (IRST)

Karat Koti (Persian: كرات كتي) (Note: Also romanized as Karāt Kotī; also known as Karatkatī) is a village in Natel-e Restaq Rural District of Chamestan District in Nur County, Mazandaran province, Iran.

== Demographics ==
=== Population ===
At the time of the 2006 National Census, the village's population was 757 in 177 households. The following census in 2011 counted 766 people in 209 households. The 2016 census measured the population of the village as 712 people in 220 households.
