= Banafsheh Deh, Nur =

Village in Mazandaran province, Iran

Banafsheh Deh Persian: بنفشه ده
- Village
- Location within Iran
- Coordinates: 36°28′36″N 52°13′41″E
- Country: Iran
- Province: Mazandaran
- County: Nur
- District: Chamestan
- Rural District: Mianrud

Population (2016)
  - Total: 473
- Time zone: UTC+3:30 (IRST)

Banafsheh Deh (Persian: بنفشه ده) is a village in, and the capital of, Mianrud Rural District in Chamestan District of Nur County, Mazandaran province, Iran.

== Demographics ==
=== Population ===
At the time of the 2006 National Census, the village's population was 478 in 132 households. The following census in 2011 counted 448 people in 130 households. The 2016 census measured the population of the village as 473 people in 155 households.
