= Bari Kola =

Bari Kola (Persian: باريكلا or بريكلا) may refer to:

- Bari Kola (Bārī Kolā) (باريكلا - Bārī Kolā)
- Bari Kola (Barī Kolā) (بريكلا - Barī Kolā)
