= Saldeh-e Sofla =

Saldeh-e Sofla سالده سفلي
- Village
- Location within Iran
- Coordinates: 36°31′50″N 52°10′29″E
- Country: Iran
- Province: Mazandaran
- County: Nur
- Bakhsh: Chamestan
- Rural District: Natel-e Restaq

Population (2006)
  - Total: 177
- Time zone: UTC+3:30 (IRST)
  - Summer (DST): UTC+4:30 (IRDT)

Saldeh-e Sofla (Persian: سالده سفلي, also Romanized as Sāldeh-e Soflá; also known as Pā’īn Sāldeh) is a village in Natel-e Restaq Rural District, Chamestan District, Nur County, Mazandaran Province, Iran. As of the 2006 census, its population was 177, in 43 families.
