= Ahu Dasht, Nur =

Village in Mazandaran province, Iran

Ahu Dasht Persian: اهودشت
- Village
- Location within Iran
- Coordinates: 36°30′06″N 52°09′03″E
- Country: Iran
- Province: Mazandaran
- County: Nur
- District: Chamestan
- Rural District: Natel-e Restaq

Population (2016)
  - Total: 1,594
- Time zone: UTC+3:30 (IRST)

Ahu Dasht (Persian: اهودشت) (Note: Also romanized as Āhū Dasht) is a village in Natel-e Restaq Rural District of Chamestan District in Nur County, Mazandaran province, Iran.

== Demographics ==
=== Population ===
At the time of the 2006 National Census, the village's population was 1,459 in 361 households. The following census in 2011 counted 1,418 people in 400 households. The 2016 census measured the population of the village as 1,594 people in 493 households.
