= Sadat Mahalleh, Chamestan =

Village in Mazandaran province, Iran

Sadat Mahalleh Persian: سادات محله
- Village
- Location within Iran
- Coordinates: 36°22′39″N 52°02′15″E
- Country: Iran
- Province: Mazandaran
- County: Nur
- District: Chamestan
- Rural District: Lavij

Population (2016)
  - Total: 85
- Time zone: UTC+3:30 (IRST)

Sadat Mahalleh (Persian: سادات محله) (Note: Also romanized as Sādāt Maḩalleh) is a village in Lavij Rural District of Chamestan District in Nur County, Mazandaran province, Iran.

== Demographics ==
=== Population ===
At the time of the 2006 National Census, the village's population was 100 in 22 households. The following census in 2011 counted 96 people in 24 households. The 2016 census measured the population of the village as 85 people in 27 households.
