= Khatib Kola =

Khatib Kola (Persian: خطيب كلا) may refer to:

- Khatib Kola, Lavij
- Khatib Kola, Mianrud
