= Varazdeh-e Olya =

Varazdeh-e Olya ورازده عليا
- Village
- Location within Iran
- Coordinates: 36°27′12″N 52°11′39″E
- Country: Iran
- Province: Mazandaran
- County: Nur
- Bakhsh: Chamestan
- Rural District: Mianrud

Population (2006)
  - Total: 292
- Time zone: UTC+3:30 (IRST)
  - Summer (DST): UTC+4:30 (IRDT)

Varazdeh-e Olya (Persian: ورازده عليا, also Romanized as Varāzdeh-e ‘Olyā; also known as Varāzdeh-ye Bālā) is a village in Mianrud Rural District, Chamestan District, Nur County, Mazandaran Province, Iran. At the 2006 census, its population was 292, in 72 families.
