= Seyyed Kola, Nur =

Village in Mazandaran province, Iran

Seyyed Kola Persian: صيدكلا
- Village
- Location within Iran
- Coordinates: 36°30′09″N 52°05′20″E
- Country: Iran
- Province: Mazandaran
- County: Nur
- District: Chamestan
- Rural District: Natel-e Restaq

Population (2016)
  - Total: 1,007
- Time zone: UTC+3:30 (IRST)

Seyyed Kola (Persian: صيدكلا) (Note: Also romanized as Seyyed Kalā, Şeyyed Kolā, and Seyyed Kolā) is a village in Natel-e Restaq Rural District of Chamestan District in Nur County, Mazandaran province, Iran.

== Demographics ==
=== Population ===
At the time of the 2006 National Census, the village's population was 966 in 241 households. The following census in 2011 counted 983 people in 265 households. The 2016 census measured the population of the village as 1,007 people in 300 households.
