= Korchi, Iran =

Village in Mazandaran province, Iran

Korchi Persian: كرچي
- Village
- Location within Iran
- Coordinates: 36°23′22″N 52°01′24″E
- Country: Iran
- Province: Mazandaran
- County: Nur
- District: Chamestan
- Rural District: Lavij

Population (2016)
  - Total: 245
- Time zone: UTC+3:30 (IRST)

Korchi (Persian: كرچي) (Note: Also romanized as Korchī; also known as Korjī) is a village in Lavij Rural District of Chamestan District in Nur County, Mazandaran province, Iran.

== Demographics ==
=== Population ===
At the time of the 2006 National Census, the village's population was 317 in 68 households. The following census in 2011 counted 251 people in 70 households. The 2016 census measured the population of the village as 245 people in 70 households.
