= Chammaz Kola, Nur =

Chammaz Kola چمازكلا
- Village
- Location within Iran
- Coordinates: 36°32′37″N 52°07′21″E
- Country: Iran
- Province: Mazandaran
- County: Nur
- Bakhsh: Chamestan
- Rural District: Natel-e Restaq

Population (2006)
  - Total: 465
- Time zone: UTC+3:30 (IRST)
  - Summer (DST): UTC+4:30 (IRDT)

Chammaz Kola (Persian: چمازكلا, also Romanized as Chammāz Kolā) is a village in Natel-e Restaq Rural District, Chamestan District, Nur County, Mazandaran Province, Iran. At the 2006 census, its population was 465, in 120 families.
