= Shir Kola, Nur =

Village in Mazandaran province, Iran

Shir Kola Persian: شيركلا
- Village
- Location within Iran
- Coordinates: 36°31′04″N 52°13′03″E
- Country: Iran
- Province: Mazandaran
- County: Nur
- District: Chamestan
- Rural District: Mianrud

Population (2016)
  - Total: 1,342
- Time zone: UTC+3:30 (IRST)

Shir Kola (Persian: شيركلا) (Note: Also romanized as Shīr Kolā) is a village in Mianrud Rural District of Chamestan District in Nur County, Mazandaran province, Iran.

== Demographics ==
=== Population ===
At the time of the 2006 National Census, the village's population was 1,348 in 328 households. The following census in 2011 counted 1,386 people in 406 households. The 2016 census measured the population of the village as 1,342 people in 444 households, the most populous in its rural district.
