= Khatib Kola, Mianrud =

Khatib Kola خطيب كلا
- Village
- Location within Iran
- Coordinates: 36°28′38″N 52°10′39″E
- Country: Iran
- Province: Mazandaran
- County: Nur
- Bakhsh: Chamestan
- Rural District: Mianrud

Population (2006)
  - Total: 149
- Time zone: UTC+3:30 (IRST)
  - Summer (DST): UTC+4:30 (IRDT)

Khatib Kola (Persian: خطيب كلا, also Romanized as Khaţīb Kolā) is a village in Mianrud Rural District, Chamestan District, Nur County, Mazandaran Province, Iran. At the 2006 census, its population was 149, in 39 families.
