= Jalikan =

Jalikan (Persian: جليكان) may refer to:

- Jalikan-e Olya
- Jalikan-e Sofla
