= Espi Kola =

Village in Mazandaran province, Iran

Espi Kola Persian: اسپي كلا
- Village
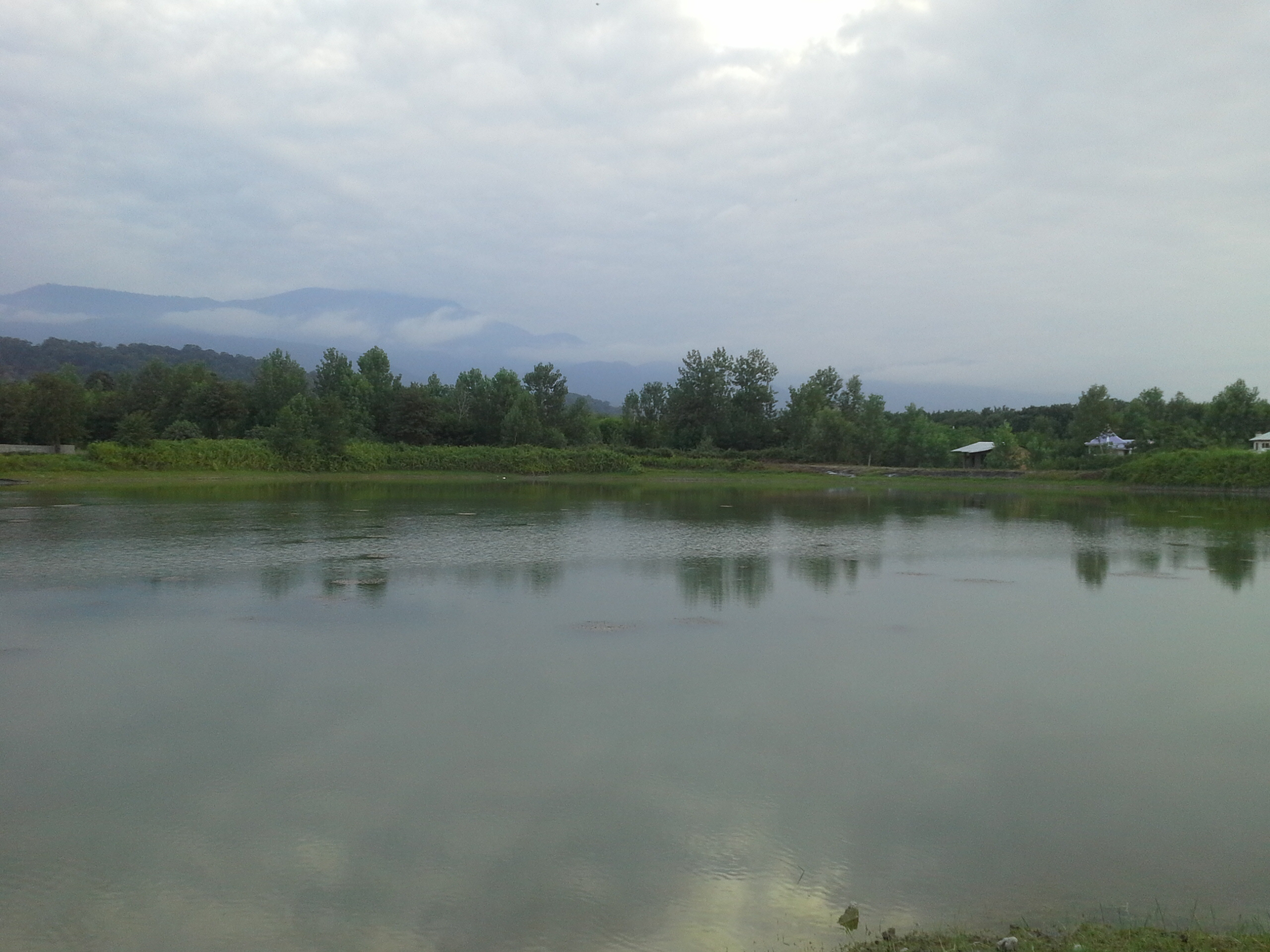
- Espi Kola Lake

- Location within Iran
- Coordinates: 36°29′24″N 52°05′44″E
- Country: Iran
- Province: Mazandaran
- County: Nur
- District: Chamestan
- Rural District: Natel-e Restaq

Population (2016)
  - Total: 834
- Time zone: UTC+3:30 (IRST)

Espi Kola (Persian: اسپي كلا) (Note: Also romanized as Espī Kolā) is a village in Natel-e Restaq Rural District of Chamestan District in Nur County, Mazandaran province, Iran.

== Demographics ==
=== Population ===
At the time of the 2006 National Census, the village's population was 670 in 170 households. The following census in 2011 counted 702 people in 197 households. The 2016 census measured the population of the village as 834 people in 264 households.
