= Beh Bonak =

Village in Mazandaran province, Iran

Beh Bonak Persian: به بنك
- Village
- Location within Iran
- Coordinates: 36°22′44″N 52°00′50″E
- Country: Iran
- Province: Mazandaran
- County: Nur
- District: Chamestan
- Rural District: Lavij

Population (2016)
  - Total: 252
- Time zone: UTC+3:30 (IRST)

Beh Bonak (Persian: به بنك) (Note: Also romanized as Behbanak) is a village in Lavij Rural District of Chamestan District in Nur County, Mazandaran province, Iran.

== Demographics ==
=== Population ===
At the time of the 2006 National Census, the village's population was 276 in 74 households. The following census in 2011 counted 241 people in 76 households. The 2016 census measured the population of the village as 252 people in 88 households.
