= Kia Kola, Nur =

Village in Mazandaran province, Iran

Kia Kola Persian: كياكلا
- Village
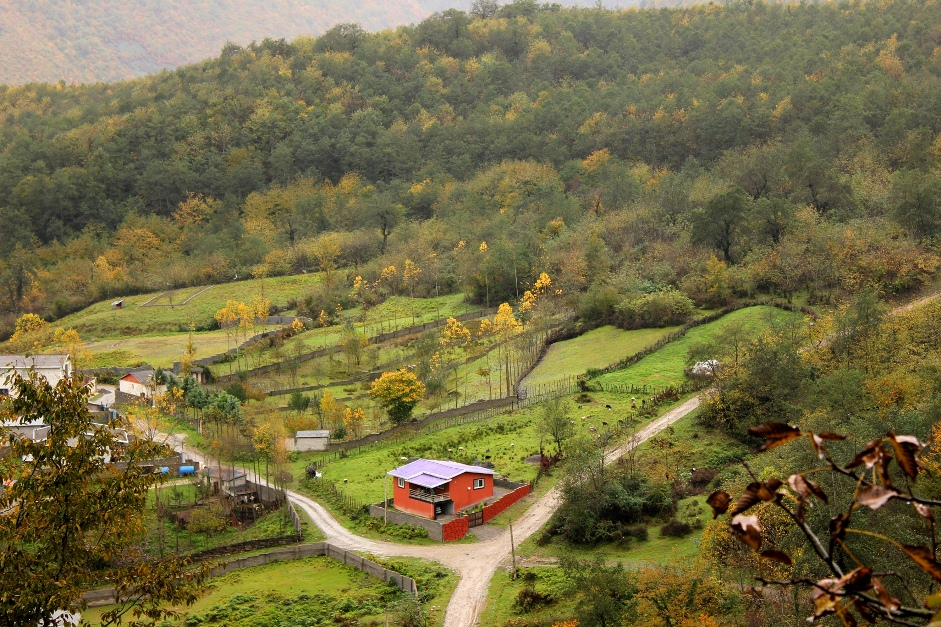
- Landscape near the village of Kia Kola

- Location within Iran
- Coordinates: 36°22′11″N 52°02′22″E
- Country: Iran
- Province: Mazandaran
- County: Nur
- District: Chamestan
- Rural District: Lavij

Population (2016)
  - Total: 873
- Time zone: UTC+3:30 (IRST)

Kia Kola (Persian: كياكلا) (Note: Also romanized as Kīā Kalā, Kīā Kolā, and Kīyā Kalā) is a village in Lavij Rural District of Chamestan District in Nur County, Mazandaran province, Iran.

== Demographics ==
=== Population ===
At the time of the 2006 National Census, the village's population was 784 in 186 households. The following census in 2011 counted 738 people in 226 households. The 2016 census measured the population of the village as 873 people in 284 households, the most populous in its rural district.
