= Abbas Kola, Nur =

Abbas Kola عباس كلا
- Village
- Location within Iran
- Coordinates: 36°30′32″N 52°06′03″E
- Country: Iran
- Province: Mazandaran
- County: Nur
- Bakhsh: Chamestan
- Rural District: Natel-e Restaq

Population (2016)
  - Total: 604
- Time zone: UTC+3:30 (IRST)

Abbas Kola (Persian: عباس كلا, also Romanized as ‘Abbās Kolā) is a village in Natel-e Restaq Rural District, Chamestan District, Nur County, Mazandaran Province, Iran.

At the time of the 2006 National Census, the village's population was 579 in 149 households. The following census in 2011 counted 572 people in 175 households. The 2016 census measured the population of the village as 604 people in 195 households.
