= Saldeh-e Olya =

Saldeh-e Olya سالده عليا
- Village
- Location within Iran
- Coordinates: 36°31′22″N 52°10′36″E
- Country: Iran
- Province: Mazandaran
- County: Nur
- Bakhsh: Chamestan
- Rural District: Natel-e Restaq

Population (2006)
  - Total: 401
- Time zone: UTC+3:30 (IRST)
  - Summer (DST): UTC+4:30 (IRDT)

Saldeh-e Olya (Persian: سالده عليا, also Romanized as Sāldeh-e ‘Olyā; also known as Bālā Sāldeh and Sāldeh-e Bālā) is a village in Natel-e Restaq Rural District, Chamestan District, Nur County, Mazandaran Province, Iran. At the 2006 census, its population was 401, in 93 families.
