= Vaz-e Olya =

Vaz-e Olya وازعليا
- Village
- Location within Iran
- Coordinates: 36°19′50″N 52°07′25″E
- Country: Iran
- Province: Mazandaran
- County: Nur
- Bakhsh: Chamestan
- Rural District: Natel-e Restaq

Population (2006)
  - Total: 265
- Time zone: UTC+3:30 (IRST)
  - Summer (DST): UTC+4:30 (IRDT)

Vaz-e Olya (Persian: وازعليا, also Romanized as Vāz-e ‘Olyā; also known as Vāz Bālā and Vāz-e Bālā) is a village in Natel-e Restaq Rural District, Chamestan District, Nur County, Mazandaran Province, Iran. At the 2006 census, its population was 265, in 68 families.
