= Beri Kola =

Village in Mazandaran province, Iran

Beri Kola Persian: بريكلا
- Village
- Location within Iran
- Coordinates: 36°29′26″N 52°12′50″E
- Country: Iran
- Province: Mazandaran
- County: Nur
- District: Chamestan
- Rural District: Mianrud

Population (2016)
  - Total: 362
- Time zone: UTC+3:30 (IRST)

Beri Kola (Persian: بريكلا) (Note: Also romanized as Bari Kola, Barī Kolā, and Berī Kolā) is a village in Mianrud Rural District of Chamestan District in Nur County, Mazandaran province, Iran.

== Demographics ==
=== Population ===
At the time of the 2006 National Census, the village's population was 351 in 85 households. The following census in 2011 counted 367 people in 103 households. The 2016 census measured the population of the village as 362 people in 120 households.
