= Jalikan-e Sofla =

Village in Mazandaran province, Iran

Jalikan-e Sofla Persian: جليكان سفلي
- Village
- Location within Iran
- Coordinates: 36°29′38″N 52°11′25″E
- Country: Iran
- Province: Mazandaran
- County: Nur
- District: Chamestan
- Rural District: Mianrud

Population (2016)
  - Total: 739
- Time zone: UTC+3:30 (IRST)

Jalikan-e Sofla (Persian: جليكان سفلي) (Note: Also romanized as Jalīkān-e Soflá; also known as Jalīkān-e Pā’īn) is a village in Mianrud Rural District of Chamestan District in Nur County, Mazandaran province, Iran.

== Demographics ==
=== Population ===
At the time of the 2006 National Census, the village's population was 878 in 227 households. The following census in 2011 counted 852 people in 260 households. The 2016 census measured the population of the village as 739 people in 269 households.
