= Waz =

Waz or WAZ may refer to:

- Waz (Bangladesh), a traditional Islamic preaching event in Bangladesh
- Waz, Iran (disambiguation), places in Iran
- WAZ-Mediengruppe, German newspaper and magazine publisher
- Wąż, a Polish coat of arms
- WΔZ, a 2007 crime/horror film starring Stellan Skarsgård, Melissa George, Ashley Walters, and Selma Blair
- Westdeutsche Allgemeine Zeitung, a German newspaper
- Worked All Zones, an amateur radio operating award
- Warwick Airport (Queensland), IATA airport code "WAZ"
