= Vaz =

Vaz or VAZ also may refer to:

- Vaz (surname), people named Vaz
- Vaz, Iran (disambiguation), places in Iran
- AutoVAZ, a Russian automobile manufacturer
