= Khatib Kola, Lavij =

Village in Mazandaran province, Iran

Khatib Kola Persian: خطيب كلا
- Village
- Location within Iran
- Coordinates: 36°22′29″N 52°01′56″E
- Country: Iran
- Province: Mazandaran
- County: Nur
- District: Chamestan
- Rural District: Lavij

Population (2016)
  - Total: 201
- Time zone: UTC+3:30 (IRST)

Khatib Kola (Persian: خطيب كلا) (Note: Also romanized as Khaţīb Kolā) is a village in Lavij Rural District of Chamestan District in Nur County, Mazandaran province, Iran.

== Demographics ==
=== Population ===
At the time of the 2006 National Census, the village's population was 138 in 28 households. The following census in 2011 counted 117 people in 37 households. The 2016 census measured the population of the village as 201 people in 62 households.
