= Jurband =

Jurband (Persian: جوربند) may refer to:

- Jurband, Behshahr
- Jurband, Nur
