= Jurband, Nur =

Village in Mazandaran province, Iran

Jurband Persian: جوربند
- Village
- Location within Iran
- Coordinates: 36°26′25″N 52°07′18″E
- Country: Iran
- Province: Mazandaran
- County: Nur
- District: Chamestan
- Rural District: Natel-e Restaq

Population (2016)
  - Total: 1,911
- Time zone: UTC+3:30 (IRST)

Jurband (Persian: جوربند) (Note: Also romanized as Jūrband; also known as Jorband) is a village in Natel-e Restaq Rural District of Chamestan District in Nur County, Mazandaran province, Iran.

== Demographics ==
=== Population ===
At the time of the 2006 National Census, the village's population was 1,870 in 537 households. The following census in 2011 counted 1,911 people in 598 households. The 2016 census measured the population of the village as 1,911 people in 626 households, the most populous in its rural district.
