= Chamaz Kola =

Chamaz Kola or Chammaz Kola (Persian: چمازكلا) may refer to one of several villages in Mazandaran Province, Iran:

- Chamaz Kola, Babol
- Chammaz Kola, Nur
- Chamaz Kola, Qaem Shahr
