= Dar Kola, Nur =

Village in Mazandaran province, Iran

Dar Kola Persian: داركلا
- Village
- Location within Iran
- Coordinates: 36°27′52″N 52°11′37″E
- Country: Iran
- Province: Mazandaran
- County: Nur
- District: Chamestan
- Rural District: Mianrud

Population (2016)
  - Total: 643
- Time zone: UTC+3:30 (IRST)

Dar Kola (Persian: داركلا) (Note: Also romanized as Dār Kolā) is a village in Mianrud Rural District of Chamestan District in Nur County, Mazandaran province, Iran.

== Demographics ==
=== Population ===
At the time of the 2006 National Census, the village's population was 616 in 161 households. The following census in 2011 counted 607 people in 181 households. The 2016 census measured the population of the village as 643 people in 201 households.
