= Varazdeh-e Sofla =

Village in Mazandaran province, Iran

Varazdeh-e Sofla Persian: ورازده سفلي
- Village
- Location within Iran
- Coordinates: 36°27′55″N 52°10′50″E
- Country: Iran
- Province: Mazandaran
- County: Nur
- District: Chamestan
- Rural District: Mianrud

Population (2016)
  - Total: 660
- Time zone: UTC+3:30 (IRST)

Varazdeh-e Sofla (Persian: ورازده سفلي) (Note: Also romanized as Varāzdeh-e Soflá; also known as Varāzdeh-ye Pā’īn) is a village in Mianrud Rural District of Chamestan District in Nur County, Mazandaran province, Iran.

== Demographics ==
=== Population ===
At the time of the 2006 National Census, the village's population was 546 in 139 households. The following census in 2011 counted 637 people in 192 households. The 2016 census measured the population of the village as 660 people in 220 households.
