= Sangtab =

Sangtab or Sang Tab (Persian: سنگ تاب) may refer to:

- Sangtab, Nur
- Sangtab, Simorgh
