= Mirna =

Mirna may refer to:

== Places ==
- Mirna (Adriatic Sea), a river in Croatia
- Mirna, Iran, a village in Iran

=== in Slovenia ===
- Mirna (Sava), a river in Slovenia
- Mirna Valley, a valley in Slovenia
- Mirna, Mirna, Slovenia; the seat of the eponymous municipality
- Municipality of Mirna, a municipality in Slovenia
- Mount Mirna, a hill in Slovenia

== People ==
- Mirna (name), a female name

== Other uses ==
- microRNA, abbreviated as miRNA
- USS Mirna (SP-1214), a United States Navy patrol boat in commission from 1917 to 1918
- Mirna-class patrol boat (Type 171), a Yugoslav patrol boat class
