= Dar Kola =

Dar Kola (Persian: داركلا) may refer to:

- Dar Kola, Amol
- Dar Kola, Nur
