= Bari Kola, Iran =

Village in Mazandaran province, Iran

Bari Kola Persian: باريكلا
- Village
- Location within Iran
- Coordinates: 36°27′14″N 52°12′06″E
- Country: Iran
- Province: Mazandaran
- County: Nur
- District: Chamestan
- Rural District: Mianrud

Population (2016)
  - Total: 568
- Time zone: UTC+3:30 (IRST)

Bari Kola (Persian: باريكلا) (Note: Also romanized as Bārī Kolā) is a village in Mianrud Rural District of Chamestan District in Nur County, Mazandaran province, Iran.

== Demographics ==
=== Population ===
At the time of the 2006 National Census, the village's population was 546 in 115 households. The following census in 2011 counted 547 people in 150 households. The 2016 census measured the population of the village as 568 people in 172 households.
