= Jalikan-e Olya =

Village in Mazandaran province, Iran

Jalikan-e Olya Persian: جليكان عليا
- Village
- Location within Iran
- Coordinates: 36°29′53″N 52°10′50″E
- Country: Iran
- Province: Mazandaran
- County: Nur
- District: Chamestan
- Rural District: Mianrud

Population (2016)
  - Total: 558
- Time zone: UTC+3:30 (IRST)

Jalikan-e Olya (Persian: جليكان عليا) (Note: Also romanized as Jalīkān-e ‘Olyā; also known as Jalīkān and Jalīkān-e Bālā) is a village in Mianrud Rural District of Chamestan District in Nur County, Mazandaran province, Iran.

== Demographics ==
=== Population ===
At the time of the 2006 National Census, the village's population was 548 in 142 households. The following census in 2011 counted 573 people in 173 households. The 2016 census measured the population of the village as 558 people in 180 households.
