= Vaz, Iran =

Vaz or Waz (Persian: واز) in Iran may refer to:

- Vaz-e Olya
- Vaz-e Sofla
- Vaz-e Tangeh
