= Sang-e Vares =

Neighborhood in Mazandaran province, Iran

Sang-e Vares Persian: سنگ وارث
- Neighborhood
- Location within Iran
- Coordinates: 36°40′01″N 51°19′40″E
- Country: Iran
- Province: Mazandaran
- County: Chalus
- District: Central
- City: Hachirud

Population (2011)
  - Total: 1,034
- Time zone: UTC+3:30 (IRST)

Sang-e Vares (Persian: سنگ وارث) (Note: Also romanized as Sang-e Vāres̄) is a neighborhood in the city of Hachirud in the Central District of Chalus County, Mazandaran province, Iran.

== Demographics ==
=== Population ===
At the time of the 2006 National Census, Sang-e Vares's population was 957 in 267 households, when it was a village in Kelarestaq-e Gharbi Rural District. The following census in 2011 counted 1,034 people in 313 households.

In 2010, the village of Hachirud merged with the villages of Abbas Kola, Akbarabad, Chakhani, Delgosha, Dujman, Emamrud, Herteh Kola, Kia Kola, Mesedeh, Mohammad Hoseynabad, Nursar, and Sang-e Vares in the establishment of the new city of Hachirud.
