= Hachirud =

City in Mazandaran province, Iran

Hachirud Persian: هچیرود
- City
- Location within Iran
- Coordinates: 36°41′08″N 51°20′42″E
- Country: Iran
- Province: Mazandaran
- County: Chalus
- District: Central
- Established as a city: 2010

Population (2016)
  - Total: 10,398
- Time zone: UTC+3:30 (IRST)

Hachirud (Persian: هچیرود) (Note: Also romanized as Hachi Rūd and Hachīrūd; also known as Hacherūd) is a city in the Central District of Chalus County, Mazandaran province, Iran, serving as the administrative center for Kelarestaq-e Gharbi Rural District.

== Demographics ==
=== Population ===
At the time of the 2006 National Census, Hachirud's population was 1,750 in 476 households, when it was a village in Kelarestaq-e Gharbi Rural District. The following census in 2011 counted 1,750 people in 557 households. The 2016 census measured the population as 10,398 people in 3,471 households, by which time the village had been converted to a city after merging with 12 villages: Abbas Kola, Akbarabad, Chakhani, Delgosha, Dujman, Emamrud, Herteh Kola, Kia Kola, Mesedeh, Mohammad Hoseynabad, Nursar, and Sang-e Vares.
