= Chakhani =

Neighborhood in Mazandaran province, Iran

Neighborhood Persian: چاخانی
- Former Village
- Location within Iran
- Coordinates: 36°40′01″N 51°20′07″E
- Country: Iran
- Province: Mazandaran
- County: Chalus
- District: Central
- City: Hachirud

Population (2011)
  - Total: 481
- Time zone: UTC+3:30 (IRST)

Chakhani (Persian: چاخانی) (Note: Also romanized as Chākhānī) is a neighborhood in the city of Hachirud in the Central District of Chalus County, Mazandaran province, Iran.

== Demographics ==
=== Population ===
At the time of the 2006 National Census, Chakhani's population was 513 in 150 households, when it was a village in Kelarestaq-e Gharbi Rural District. The following census in 2011 counted 481 people in 151 households.

In 2010, the village of Hachirud merged with the villages of Abbas Kola, Akbarabad, Chakhani, Delgosha, Dujman, Emamrud, Herteh Kola, Kia Kola, Mesedeh, Mohammad Hoseynabad, Nursar, and Sang-e Vares in the establishment of the new city of Hachirud.
