= Dujman =

Neighborhood in Mazandaran province, Iran

Dujman Persian: دلگشا
- Neighborhood
- Location within Iran
- Coordinates: 36°41′10″N 51°22′20″E
- Country: Iran
- Province: Mazandaran
- County: Chalus
- District: Central
- City: Hachirud

Population (2011)
  - Total: 389
- Time zone: UTC+3:30 (IRST)

Dujman (Persian: دوجمان) (Note: Also romanized as Dūjmān) is a neighborhood in the city of Hachirud in the Central District of Chalus County, Mazandaran province, Iran.

== Demographics ==
=== Population ===
At the time of the 2006 National Census, Dujman's population was 386 in 118 households, when it was a village in Kelarestaq-e Gharbi Rural District. The following census in 2011 counted 389 people in 128 households.

In 2010, the village of Hachirud merged with the villages of Abbas Kola, Akbarabad, Chakhani, Delgosha, Dujman, Emamrud, Herteh Kola, Kia Kola, Mesedeh, Mohammad Hoseynabad, Nursar, and Sang-e Vares in the establishment of the new city of Hachirud.
