= Nursar =

Neighborhood in Mazandaran province, Iran

Nursar Persian: نورسر
- Neighborhood
- Location within Iran
- Coordinates: 36°41′12″N 51°19′37″E
- Country: Iran
- Province: Mazandaran
- County: Chalus
- District: Central
- City: Hachirud

Population (2011)
  - Total: 794
- Time zone: UTC+3:30 (IRST)

Nursar (Persian: نورسر) (Note: Also romanized as Nūr-e Sar and Nūrsar) is a neighborhood in the city of Hachirud in the Central District of Chalus County, Mazandaran province, Iran.

== Demographics ==
=== Population ===
At the time of the 2006 National Census, Nursar's population was 865 in 242 households, when it was a village in Kelarestaq-e Gharbi Rural District. The following census in 2011 counted 794 people in 251 households.

In 2010, the village of Hachirud merged with the villages of Abbas Kola, Akbarabad, Chakhani, Delgosha, Dujman, Emamrud, Herteh Kola, Kia Kola, Mesedeh, Mohammad Hoseynabad, Nursar, and Sang-e Vares in the establishment of the new city of Hachirud.
