= Chamestan =

City in Mazandaran province, Iran

Chamestan Persian: چمستان
- City
- Location within Iran
- Coordinates: 36°28′45″N 52°07′10″E
- Country: Iran
- Province: Mazandaran
- County: Nur
- District: Chamestan

Population (2016)
  - Total: 11,194
- Time zone: UTC+3:30 (IRST)

Chamestan (Persian: چمستان) (Note: Also romanized as Chamestān and Chomastan) is a city in, and the capital of, Chamestan District in Nur County, Mazandaran province, Iran. It also serves as the administrative center for Natel-e Restaq Rural District.

== Demographics ==
=== Population ===
At the time of the 2006 National Census, the city's population was 9,481 in 2,420 households. The following census in 2011 counted 10,617 people in 3,078 households. The 2016 census measured the population of the city as 11,194 people in 3,492 households.
