= Lavij Rural District =

Rural district in Mazandaran province, Iran

Lavij Rural District Persian: دهستان لاويج
- Rural District
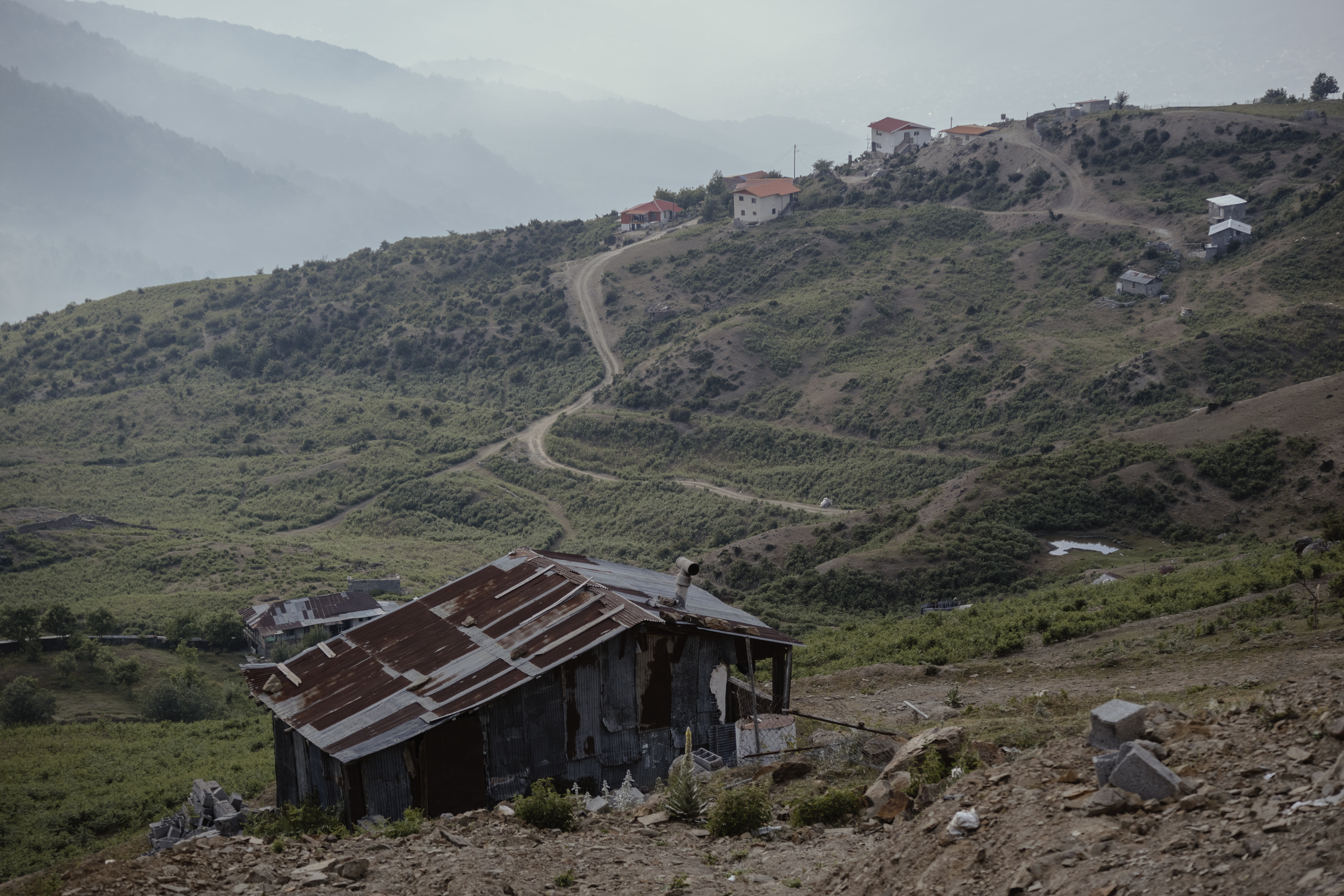
- Lavij Rural District

- Location within Iran
- Coordinates: 36°22′N 51°59′E
- Country: Iran
- Province: Mazandaran
- County: Nur
- District: Chamestan
- Established: 1990
- Capital: Rais Kola

Population (2016)
  - Total: 3,239
- Time zone: UTC+3:30 (IRST)

Lavij Rural District (Persian: دهستان لاويج) is in Chamestan District of Nur County, Mazandaran province, Iran. Its capital is the village of Rais Kola.

== Demographics ==
=== Population ===
At the time of the 2006 National Census, the rural district's population was 3,229 in 741 households. There were 2,968 inhabitants in 866 households at the following census of 2011. The 2016 census measured the population of the rural district as 3,239 in 1,022 households. The most populous of its 15 villages was Kia Kola, with 873 people.

=== Other villages in the rural district ===
- Aghuz Koti
- Beh Bonak
- Dizin Kola
- Khatib Kola
- Khvortab-e Rudbar
- Korchi
- Molla Kola
- Molla Mahalleh
- Sadat Mahalleh
