= Emamrud =

Neighborhood in Mazandaran province, Iran

Emamrud Persian: امامرود
- Neighborhood
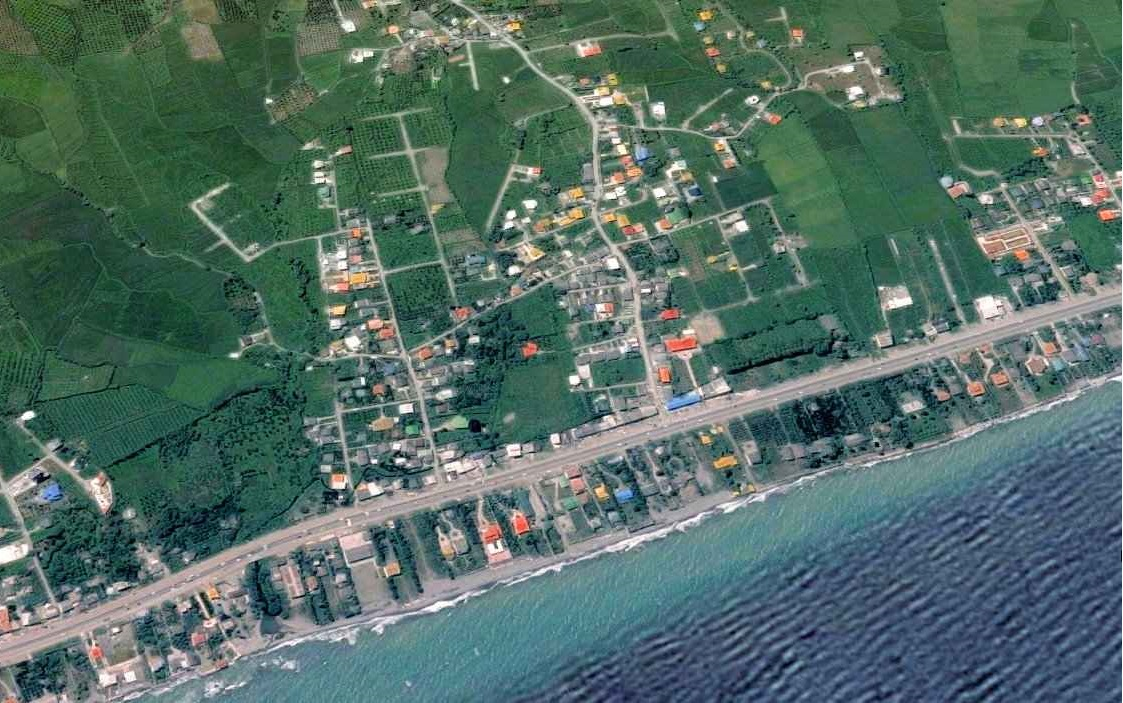
- Aerial view of the neighborhood of Emamrud in the city of Hachirud

- Location within Iran
- Coordinates: 36°41′03″N 51°21′33″E
- Country: Iran
- Province: Mazandaran
- County: Chalus
- District: Central
- City: Hachirud

Population (2011)
  - Total: 680
- Time zone: UTC+3:30 (IRST)

Emamrud (Persian: امامرود) (Note: Also romanized as Emāmrūd) is a neighborhood in the city of Hachirud in the Central District of Chalus County, Mazandaran province, Iran.

== Demographics ==
=== Population ===
At the time of the 2006 National Census, Emamrud's population was 660 in 190 households, when it was a village in Kelarestaq-e Gharbi Rural District. The following census in 2011 counted 680 people in 215 households.

In 2010, the village of Hachirud merged with the villages of Abbas Kola, Akbarabad, Chakhani, Delgosha, Dujman, Emamrud, Herteh Kola, Kia Kola, Mesedeh, Mohammad Hoseynabad, Nursar, and Sang-e Vares in the establishment of the new city of Hachirud.
