= Mesedeh =

Neighborhood in Mazandaran province, Iran

Mesedeh Persian: مسده
- Neighborhood
- Location within Iran
- Coordinates: 36°40′15″N 51°18′54″E
- Country: Iran
- Province: Mazandaran
- County: Chalus
- District: Central
- City: Hachirud

Population (2011)
  - Total: 818
- Time zone: UTC+3:30 (IRST)

Mesedeh (Persian: مسده) (Note: Also known as Bālā Mesedeh and Sangvārs) is a neighborhood in the city of Hachirud in the Central District of Chalus County, Mazandaran province, Iran.

== Demographics ==
=== Population ===
At the time of the 2006 National Census, Mesedeh's population was 841 in 222 households, when it was a village in Kelarestaq-e Gharbi Rural District. The following census in 2011 counted 818 people in 236 households.

In 2010, the village of Hachirud merged with the villages of Abbas Kola, Akbarabad, Chakhani, Delgosha, Dujman, Emamrud, Herteh Kola, Kia Kola, Mesedeh, Mohammad Hoseynabad, Nursar, and Sang-e Vares in the establishment of the new city of Hachirud.
