= Kelar Mound =

Tappeh Kelar تپه کلار

- Location within Iran
- 36°31′7.5″N 51°12′0.5″E
- Location: Kelardasht, Mazandaran, Iran

Iran National Heritage List
- Official name: Tappeh Kelar
- Type: Mound
- Designated: 1965
- Reference no.: 489
- Conservation organization: Cultural Heritage, Handicrafts and Tourism Organization of Iran

Kelar Mound or Kelar Tappeh is a Neolithic archaeological site in Mazandaran Province, Iran. It lies on the Kelardasht plain in the Alborz Mountains. The 10-meter high mound covers an area of 6,000 hectares. Studies of the carbon-14 remains (coal and bone) have dated the site to 6,000 before present. A cylinder seal recovered at the site depicts a man and a goat.
