= Herteh Kola =

Neighborhood in Mazandaran province, Iran

Herteh Kola Persian: هرطه كلاا
- Neighborhood
- Location within Iran
- Coordinates: 36°40′11″N 51°20′59″E
- Country: Iran
- Province: Mazandaran
- County: Chalus
- District: Central
- City: Hachirud

Population (2011)
  - Total: 1,021
- Time zone: UTC+3:30 (IRST)

Herteh Kola (Persian: هرطه كلا) (Note: Also romanized as Herţeh Kolā; also known as Hart Kolā and Hert Kalā) is a neighborhood in the city of Hachirud in the Central District of Chalus County, Mazandaran province, Iran.

== Demographics ==
=== Population ===
At the time of the 2006 National Census, Herteh Kola's population was 1,009 in 280 households, when it was a village in Kelarestaq-e Gharbi Rural District. The following census in 2011 counted 1,021 people in 327 households.

In 2010, the village of Hachirud merged with the villages of Abbas Kola, Akbarabad, Chakhani, Delgosha, Dujman, Emamrud, Herteh Kola, Kia Kola, Mesedeh, Mohammad Hoseynabad, Nursar, and Sang-e Vares in the establishment of the new city of Hachirud.
