= Mohammad Hoseynabad =

Neighborhood in Mazandaran province, Iran

Mohammad Hoseynabad Persian: محمدحسين آباد
- Neighborhood
- Location within Iran
- Coordinates: 36°41′24″N 51°19′59″E
- Country: Iran
- Province: Mazandaran
- County: Chalus
- District: Central
- City: Hachirud

Population (2011)
  - Total: 283
- Time zone: UTC+3:30 (IRST)

Mohammad Hoseynabad (Persian: محمدحسين آباد) (Note: Also romanized as Moḩammad Ḩoseynābād) is a neighborhood in the city of Hachirud in the Central District of Chalus County, Mazandaran province, Iran.

== Demographics ==
=== Population ===
At the time of the 2006 National Census, Mohammad Hoseynabad's population was 322 in 94 households, when it was a village in Kelarestaq-e Gharbi Rural District. The following census in 2011 counted 283 people in 88 households.

In 2010, the village of Hachirud merged with the villages of Abbas Kola, Akbarabad, Chakhani, Delgosha, Dujman, Emamrud, Herteh Kola, Kia Kola, Mesedeh, Mohammad Hoseynabad, Nursar, and Sang-e Vares in the establishment of the new city of Hachirud.
