= Kia Kola, Chalus =

Neighborhood in Mazandaran province, Iran

Kia Kola Persian: كياكلا
- Neighborhood
- Location within Iran
- Coordinates: 36°41′10″N 51°18′52″E
- Country: Iran
- Province: Mazandaran
- County: Chalus
- District: Central
- City: Hachirud

Population (2011)
  - Total: 517
- Time zone: UTC+3:30 (IRST)

Kia Kola (Persian: كياكلا) (Note: Also romanized as Kīā Kolā) is a neighborhood in the city of Hachirud in the Central District of Chalus County, Mazandaran province, Iran.

== Demographics ==
=== Population ===
At the time of the 2006 National Census, Kia Kola's population was 625 in 188 households, when it was a village in Kelarestaq-e Gharbi Rural District. The following census in 2011 counted 517 people in 163 households.

In 2010, the village of Hachirud merged with the villages of Abbas Kola, Akbarabad, Chakhani, Delgosha, Dujman, Emamrud, Herteh Kola, Kia Kola, Mesedeh, Mohammad Hoseynabad, Nursar, and Sang-e Vares in the establishment of the new city of Hachirud.
