= Abbas Kola, Chalus =

Neighborhood in Mazandaran province, Iran

Abbas Kola Persian: عباس كلا
- Neighborhood
- Location within Iran
- Coordinates: 36°40′45″N 51°22′48″E
- Country: Iran
- Province: Mazandaran
- County: Chalus
- District: Central
- City: Hachirud

Population (2011)
  - Total: 456
- Time zone: UTC+3:30 (IRST)

Abbas Kola (Persian: عباس كلا) (Note: Also romanized as ‘Abbās Kolā) is a neighborhood in the city of Hachirud in the Central District of Chalus County, Mazandaran province, Iran.

== Demographics ==
=== Population ===
At the time of the 2006 National Census, Abbas Kola's population was 562 in 154 households, when it was a village in Kelarestaq-e Gharbi Rural District. The following census in 2011 counted 456 people in 152 households.

In 2010, the village of Hachirud merged with the villages of Abbas Kola, Akbarabad, Chakhani, Delgosha, Dujman, Emamrud, Herteh Kola, Kia Kola, Mesedeh, Mohammad Hoseynabad, Nursar, and Sang-e Vares in the establishment of the new city of Hachirud.

Some parts of Abbas Kola remained out of Hachirud's urban limits. This part had a population of 93 people in 31 households at the time of the 2016 census.
