= Abbas Kola, Babol =

Coordinates: 36.2185°N 52.6777°E

Abbas Kola عباس كلا
- Village
- Interactive map of Abbas Kola
- Country: Iran
- Province: Mazandaran
- County: Babol
- Bakhsh: Bandpey-ye Sharqi
- Rural District: Firuzjah
- Elevation: 520 m (1,710 ft)

Population (2016)
  - Total: 0
- Time zone: UTC+3:30 (IRST)

Abbas Kola (Persian: عباس كلا, also Romanized as ʿAbbās Kolā) is a village in Firuzjah Rural District, Bandpey-ye Sharqi District, Babol County, Mazandaran Province, Iran.

At the time of the 2006 National Census, the village's population was 44 in 11 households. The following census in 2011 counted 28 people in 6 households. The 2016 census measured no households residing in the village.
