= Tappeh, West Azerbaijan =

Tappeh تپه
- Village
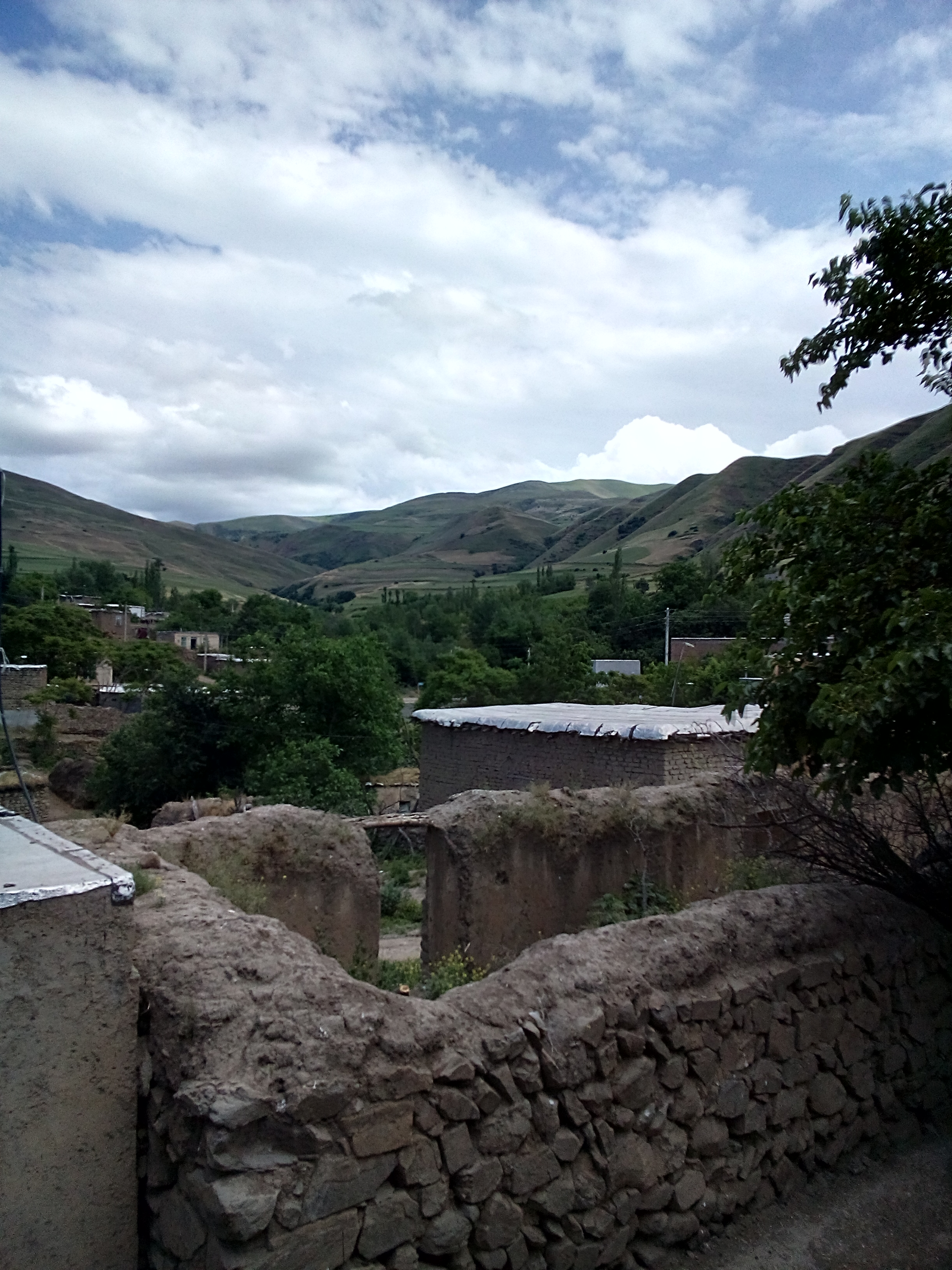
- Tappeh Village from Iran Azerbaijan

- Location within Iran
- Coordinates: 37°28′35″N 45°14′16″E
- Country: Iran
- Province: West Azerbaijan
- County: Urmia
- Bakhsh: Central
- Rural District: Torkaman

Population (2006)
  - Total: 23
- Time zone: UTC+3:30 (IRST)
  - Summer (DST): UTC+4:30 (IRDT)

Tappeh (Persian: تپه; also known as Ţālebābād) is a village in Torkaman Rural District, in the Central District of Urmia County, West Azerbaijan Province, Iran. At the 2006 census, its population was 23, in 4 families.
