= Natel-e Restaq Rural District =

Rural district in Mazandaran province, Iran

Natel-e Restaq Rural District Persian: دهستان ناتل رستاق
- Rural District
- Location within Iran
- Coordinates: 36°24′N 52°06′E
- Country: Iran
- Province: Mazandaran
- County: Nur
- District: Chamestan
- Established: 1987
- Capital: Chamestan

Population (2016)
  - Total: 15,608
- Time zone: UTC+3:30 (IRST)

Natel-e Restaq Rural District (Persian: دهستان ناتل رستاق) is in Chamestan District of Nur County, Mazandaran province, Iran. It is administered from the city of Chamestan.

== Demographics ==
=== Population ===
At the time of the 2006 National Census, the rural district's population was 14,067 in 3,557 households. There were 14,507 inhabitants in 4,198 households at the following census of 2011. The 2016 census measured the population of the rural district as 15,608 in 4,966 households. The most populous of its 33 villages was Jurband, with 1,911 people.

=== Other villages in the rural district ===
- Ahu Dasht
- Espi Kola
- Karat Koti
- Kerdabad
- Moghan Deh
- Seyyed Kola
