= Mianrud Rural District =

Rural district in Mazandaran province, Iran

Mianrud Rural District Persian: دهستان ميانرود
- Rural District
- Location within Iran
- Coordinates: 36°27′N 52°12′E
- Country: Iran
- Province: Mazandaran
- County: Nur
- District: Chamestan
- Established: 1987
- Capital: Banafsheh Deh

Population (2016)
  - Total: 14,259
- Time zone: UTC+3:30 (IRST)

Mianrud Rural District (Persian: دهستان ميانرود) is in Chamestan District of Nur County, Mazandaran province, Iran. Its capital is the village of Banafsheh Deh.

== Demographics ==
=== Population ===
At the time of the 2006 National Census, the rural district's population was 13,906 in 3,499 households. There were 13,953 inhabitants in 4,172 households at the following census of 2011. The 2016 census measured the population of the rural district as 14,259 in 4,707 households. The most populous of its 42 villages was Shir Kola, with 1,342 people.

=== Other villages in the rural district ===
- Bari Kola
- Beri Kola
- Dar Kola
- Jalikan-e Olya
- Jalikan-e Sofla
- Masumabad
- Varazdeh-e Sofla
