= Nur County =

County in Mazandaran province, Iran

Nur County Persian: شهرستان نور
- County
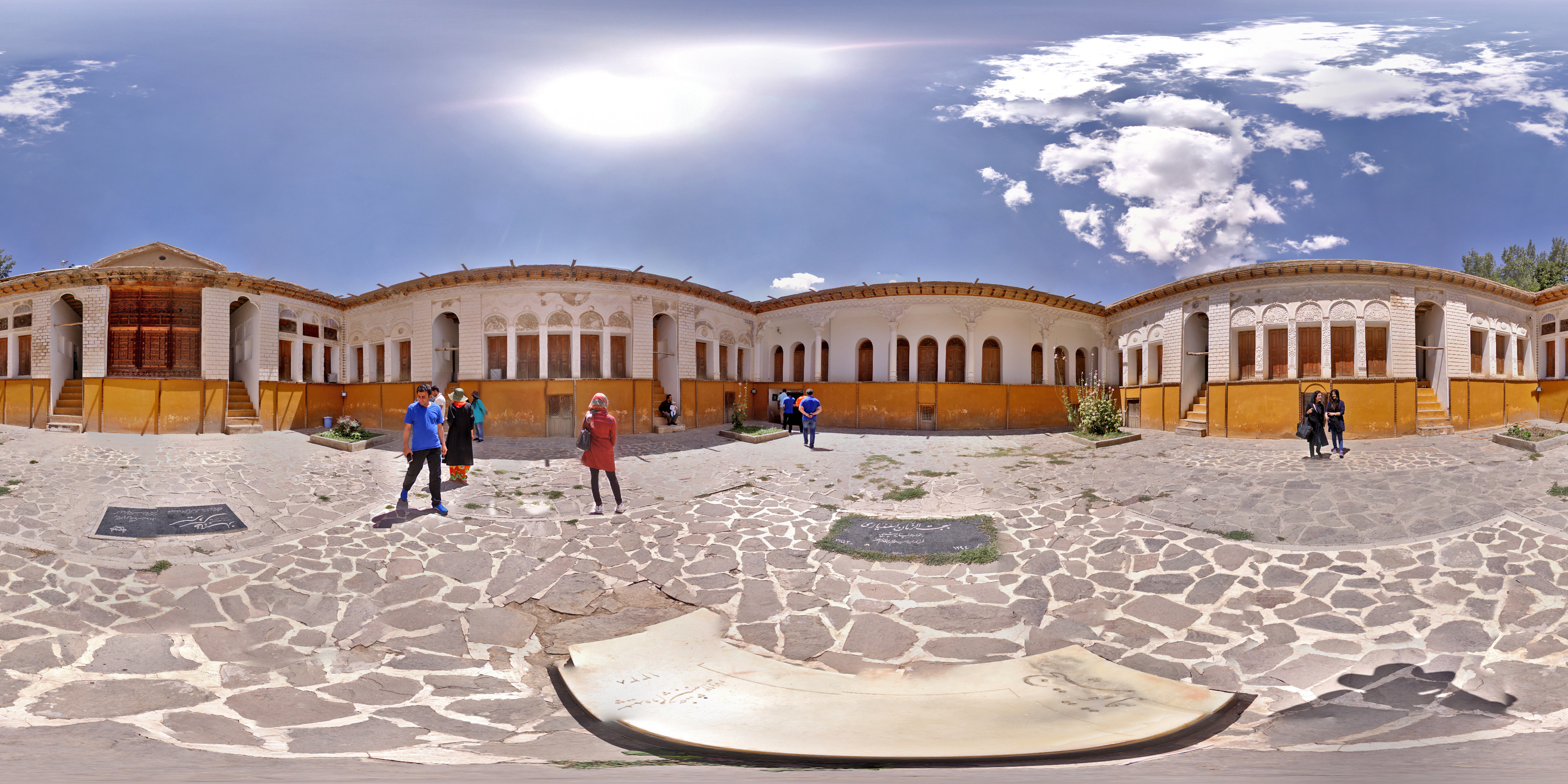

- Location of Nur County in Mazandaran province (center left, pink)

- Location of Mazandaran province in Iran
- Coordinates: 36°19′N 51°49′E
- Country: Iran
- Province: Mazandaran
- Capital: Nur
- Districts: Central, Baladeh, Chamestan

Area
  - Total: 2,675.00 km^{2} (1,032.82 sq mi)

Population (2016)
  - Total: 121,531
  - Density: 45.4321/km^{2} (117.669/sq mi)
- Time zone: UTC+3:30 (IRST)

Nur County (Persian: شهرستان نور) is in Mazandaran province, Iran. Its capital is the city of Nur.

== Demographics ==
=== Population ===
At the time of the 2006 National Census, the county's population was 104,807 in 27,699 households. The following census in 2011 counted 109,281 people in 32,461 households. The 2016 census measured the population of the county as 121,531 in 39,350 households.

=== Administrative divisions ===
Nur County's population history and administrative structure over three consecutive censuses are shown in the following table.

Nur County Population
Administrative Divisions	2006	2011	2016
Central District	57,530	61,497	69,601
Mian Band RD	8,719	9,935	11,065
Natel Kenar-e Olya RD	10,809	11,524	13,328
Natel Kenar-e Sofla RD	2,975	3,161	3,091
Izadshahr (city)	6,882	6,797	7,439
Nur (city)	21,806	22,978	26,947
Ruyan (city)	6,339	7,102	7,731
Baladeh District	6,594	5,739	7,630
Owzrud RD	1,811	1,400	2,452
Sheykh Fazlolah-e Nuri RD	2,114	2,327	3,231
Tatarestaq RD	1,535	975	977
Baladeh (city)	1,134	1,037	970
Chamestan District	40,683	42,045	44,300
Lavij RD	3,229	2,968	3,239
Mianrud RD	13,906	13,953	14,259
Natel-e Restaq RD	14,067	14,507	15,608
Chamestan (city)	9,481	10,617	11,194
Total	104,807	109,281	121,531
RD = Rural District

== See also ==
Media related to Nur County at Wikimedia Commons
