= Chamestan District =

District in Mazandaran province, Iran

Chamestan District Persian: بخش چمستان
- District
- Location within Iran
- Coordinates: 36°24′N 52°04′E
- Country: Iran
- Province: Mazandaran
- County: Nur
- Capital: Chamestan

Population (2016)
  - Total: 44,300
- Time zone: UTC+3:30 (IRST)

Chamestan District (Persian: بخش چمستان) is in Nur County, Mazandaran province, Iran. Its capital is the city of Chamestan.

== Demographics ==
=== Population ===
At the time of the 2006 National Census, the district's population was 40,683 in 10,217 households. The following census in 2011 counted 42,045 people in 12,314 households. The 2016 census measured the population of the district as 44,300 inhabitants in 14,187 households.

=== Administrative divisions ===
Chamestan District Population
Administrative Divisions	2006	2011	2016
Lavij RD	3,229	2,968	3,239
Mianrud RD	13,906	13,953	14,259
Natel-e Restaq RD	14,067	14,507	15,608
Chamestan (city)	9,481	10,617	11,194
Total	40,683	42,045	44,300
RD = Rural District
