= Kalenow =

Kalenow (Persian: كلنو) may refer to:

- Kalenow-e Olya
- Kalenow-e Sofla
