= Kalenow-e Olya =

Village in Mazandaran province, Iran

Kalenow-e Olya Persian: كلنوعليا
- Village
- Location within Iran
- Coordinates: 36.516°N 51.259°E
- Country: Iran
- Province: Mazandaran
- County: Kelardasht
- District: Central
- Rural District: East Kelardasht
- Village: Kalenow

Population (2011)
  - Total: 440
- Time zone: UTC+3:30 (IRST)

Kalenow-e Olya (Persian: كلنوعليا) (Note: Also romanized as Kalenow-ye ‘Olyā; also known as Kalenow-ye Bālā) is a neighborhood in the village of Kalenow in Kelardasht County of Mazandaran province, Iran.

It was formerly a village in Birun Bashm Rural District of Marzanabad District in Chalus County.

== Demographics ==
=== Population ===
At the time of the 2006 National Census, the village's population was 666 in 167 households, when it was in the former Kelardasht District. The following census in 2011 counted 440 people in 136 households, by which time the rural district had been separated from the district in the formation of Marzanabad District. The village merged with Kalenow-ye Sofla to form the village of Kalenow by the time of the 2016 census. Kalenow was later transferred to Kelardasht County.
