= Kalenow, Iran =

Village in Mazandaran province, Iran

Kalenow Persian: کلنو
- Village
- Location within Iran
- Coordinates: 36°30′40″N 51°15′26″E
- Country: Iran
- Province: Mazandaran
- County: Kelardasht
- District: Central
- Rural District: Kelardasht-e Sharqi

Population (2016)
  - Total: 1,241
- Time zone: UTC+3:30 (IRST)

Kalenow (Persian: كلنو) (Note: Formerly known as Kalenow-e Sofla (كلنو سفلي), also romanized as Kalenow-ye Soflá; also known as Kalenow-ye Pā’īn) is a village in Kelardasht-e Sharqi Rural District (Note: Formerly Kelardasht Rural District) of the Central District in Kelardasht County, (Note: Formerly Kelardasht District of Chalus County) Mazandaran province, Iran.

== Demographics ==
=== Population ===
At the time of the 2006 National Census, the village's population was 686 in 185 households, when it was in Birun Bashm Rural District of Kelardasht District (Note: Renamed Kelardasht County) in Chalus County and listed as Kalenow-e Sofla. The following census in 2011 counted 847 people in 261 households, by which time the rural district had been separated from the district in the formation of Marzanabad District. The 2016 census measured the population of the village as 1,241 people in 408 households, when it was listed as Kalenow.

Kalenow was transferred to Kelardasht-e Sharqi Rural District of the Central District in Kelardasht County in 2019.
