= Zarrinabad (disambiguation) =

Zarrinabad is a city in Zanjan Province, Iran.

Zarrinabad (Persian: زرين اباد) may also refer to:

- Zarrin Rud, a city in Zanjan Province, Iran
- Zarrinabad, Fars, a village
- Zarrinabad, Kerman, a village
- Zarrinabad, Bijar, Kurdistan Province, a village
- Zarrinabad, Qorveh, Kurdistan Province, a village
- Zarrinabad, Lorestan, a village
- Zarrinabad-e Olya, Mazandaran Province, a village
- Zarrinabad-e Sofla, Mazandaran Province, a village
- Zarrinabad, Qazvin, a village
- Zarrinabad, Buin Zahra, Qazvin Province, a village
- Zarrinabad, Semnan, a village
- Zarrinabad, Tehran, a village
- Zarrinabad District, in Ilam Province, Iran
