= Pasha Kola =

Pasha Kola or Pasha Kala (Persian: پاشاكلا) may refer to:

- Pasha Kola, Chelav, Amol County
- Pasha Kola, Dabuy-ye Jonubi, Amol County
- Pasha Kola, Dasht-e Sar, Amol County
- Pasha Kola, Harazpey-ye Jonubi, Amol County
- Pasha Kola-ye Bish Mahalleh, Harazpey-ye Jonubi Rural District, Amol County
- Pasha Kola, Nowshahr
- Pasha Kola, Qaem Shahr
- Pasha Kola, Bisheh Sar, Qaem Shahr County
- Pasha Kola, Sari
- Pasha Kola-ye Arbabi, Sari County
- Pasha Kola-ye Enteqali, Sari County
- Pasha Kola, Savadkuh
- Pasha Kola, Shirgah, Savadkuh County
