= Tajanak =

Tajanak (Persian: تجنك) may refer to:

- Tajanak, Amol
- Tajanak, Babol
- Tajanak-e Olya, Sari County
- Tajanak-e Sofla, Sari County
