= Sang-e Rizeh =

Sang-e Rizeh or Sang Rizeh (Persian: سنگ ريزه) may refer to:

- Sang Rizeh, Mazandaran
- Bala Sang Rizeh, Mazandaran Province
- Pain Sang Rizeh, Mazandaran Province
