= Moallem Kola =

Moallem Kola or Moallem Kala (Persian: معلم كلا) may refer to:

- Moallem Kola, Amol
- Moallem Kola, Babol
- Moallem Kola, Mahmudabad
- Bala Moallem Kola, Sari County
- Pain Moallem Kola, Sari County
