= Maleyek =

Naighborhood in Mazandaran, Iran

Maleyek, Bala Maleyek ملیک، بالا ملیک
- Neighborhood
- Location within Iran
- Coordinates: 36°32′45″N 53°01′43″E
- Country: Iran
- Province: Mazandaran
- County: Sari
- Bakhsh: Central
- City: Sari

Population (2016)
  - Total: 335
- Time zone: UTC+3:30 (IRST)

Maleyek (Persian: ملیک), also known as Bala Maleyek, is a western suburb of Sari city in Mazandaran province, Iran.

Formerly, it was a village in Esfivard-e Shurab Rural District, in the Central District of Sari County, Mazandaran Province, Iran. It was incorporated into the 3rd District of Sari city's Municipality in 2017 as Bala Maleyek neighborhood.

== Demographics ==
Maleyek population history
Year	Pop.	±%
1966	112	—
1976	170	+51.8%
1986	700	+311.8%
2006	329	−53.0%
2011	308	−6.4%
2016	335	+8.8%

At the time of the 1986 census, Maleyek had a population of 700 in 142 households. It had tap water, electricity connection, school and mosque. The agricultural products of the village have been wheat and rice.

The 2006 census measured a population of 329 people, by which time the northern part of Maleyek became a separate village named Pain Malik. At the 2016 census, the southern part had a population was 335, in 106 households.
