= Golema =

Golema or Golma (Persian: گلما) may refer to:

- Bala Golema
- Pain Golema
