= Hevela =

Neighborhood in Mazandaran province, Iran

Hevela Persian: هولا
- Neighborhood
- Location within Iran
- Coordinates: 36°33′52″N 53°07′11″E
- Country: Iran
- Province: Mazandaran
- County: Sari
- District: Central
- City: Sari

Population (2016)
  - Total: 2,784
- Time zone: UTC+3:30 (IRST)

Hevela (Persian: هولا) (Note: Also romanized as Hevelā; also known as Hevelā-ye Bālā and Hevelā-ye Pā’īn) is an eastern suburb of Sari city in Sari County, Mazandaran province, Iran. It is the easternmost neighborhood in the urban area, with Zoghal Chal neighborhood to its west and Ab Bandan Sar village and Road 22 to its south.

It was formerly a village in Miandorud-e Kuchak Rural District of the Central District.

== Demographics ==
=== Population ===
At the time of the 2006 National Census, the village's population was 2,384 in 597 households. The following census in 2011 counted 2,511 people in 698 households. The 2016 census measured the population of the village as 2,784 people in 868 households.

Hevela and Zoghal Chal were incorporated into the 1st District of Sari city's municipality in 2017.
