= Kuy Sahab ol Zeman =

Kuy Sahab ol Zeman كوي صاحب الزمان
- Village
- Interactive map of Kuy Sahab ol Zeman
- Coordinates: 36°32′16.96″N 53°0′29.21″E
- Country: Iran
- Province: Mazandaran
- County: Sari
- Bakhsh: Central
- Rural District: Esfivard-e Shurab

Population (2016)
  - Total: 312
- Time zone: UTC+3:30 (IRST)

Kuy Sahab ol Zeman (Persian: كوي صاحب الزمان, also Romanized as Kūy Şāḩab ol Zemān) is a suburb of Sari city, Mazandaran Province, Iran, located in Esfivard-e Shurab Rural District, in the Central District of Sari County At the 2006 census, its population was 322, in 82 families. In 2016 its population was 312 people in 103 households. It borders Shahrak-e Janbazan to its west.
