= Sharafdar Kola =

Sharafdar Kola (Persian: شرفداركلا) may refer to:

- Sharafdar Kola-ye Olya
- Sharafdar Kola-ye Sofla
