= Semes Kandeh =

Semes Kandeh or Semeskandeh or Samaskandeh (Persian: سمسكنده) may refer to:

- Pain Semes Kandeh
- Semes Kandeh-ye Olya
