= Mashhadi Kola =

Mashhadi Kola (Persian: مشهدي كلا) may refer to:

- Mashhadi Kola, Babol
- Mashhadi Kola, Sari
