= Taher Deh =

Taher Deh طاهرده
- Village
- Location within Iran
- Coordinates: 36°36′17″N 53°08′04″E
- Country: Iran
- Province: Mazandaran
- County: Sari
- Bakhsh: Central
- Rural District: Miandorud-e Kuchak

Population (2006)
  - Total: 598
- Time zone: UTC+3:30 (IRST)

Taher Deh (Persian: طاهرده, also Romanized as Ţāher Deh) is a village in Miandorud-e Kuchak Rural District, in the Central District of Sari County, Mazandaran Province, Iran. At the 2016 census, its population was 588, in 205 families. Down from 598 in 2006.
