= Zarrinabad-e Sofla =

Village in Mazandaran, Iran

Zarrinabad-e Sofla زرين آباد سفلی
- Village
- Location within Iran
- Coordinates: 36°31′56″N 53°11′18″E
- Country: Iran
- Province: Mazandaran
- County: Sari
- Bakhsh: Central
- Rural District: Miandorud-e Kuchak

Population (2016)
  - Total: 765
- Time zone: UTC+3:30 (IRST)

Zarrinabad-e Sofla (Persian: زرين آباد سفلی, also Romanized as Zarrīnābād-e Soflá; also known as Pā’īn Zarrīnābād and Zarrīnābād-e Pā’īn) is a village in Miandorud-e Kuchak Rural District, in the Central District of Sari County, Mazandaran Province, Iran. At the 2016 census, its population was 765, in 238 families. Up from 631 people in 2006.

It is located northwest of Zarrinabad-e Olya village.
