= Zarvijan =

Zarvijan زرويجان
- Village
- Location within Iran
- Coordinates: 36°33′25″N 53°00′09″E
- Country: Iran
- Province: Mazandaran
- County: Sari
- Bakhsh: Central
- Rural District: Esfivard-e Shurab

Population (2016)
  - Total: 998
- Time zone: UTC+3:30 (IRST)

Zarvijan (Persian: زرويجان, also Romanized as Zarvījān and Zervī Jān) is a village in Esfivard-e Shurab Rural District, in the Central District of Sari County, Mazandaran Province, Iran. At the 2016 census, its population was 998 in 341 families, up from 968 in 2006.
