= Zoghal Chal, Sari =

Neighborhood in Mazandaran province, Iran

Zoghal Chal Persian: ذغال چال
- Neighborhood
- Location within Iran
- Coordinates: 36°34′01″N 53°06′41″E
- Country: Iran
- Province: Mazandaran
- County: Sari
- District: Central
- City: Sari

Population (2016)
  - Total: 3,964
- Time zone: UTC+3:30 (IRST)

Zoghal Chal (Persian: ذغال چال) (Note: Also romanized as Z̄oghāl Chāl) is an eastern suubrb of Sari city, formerly a village in Miandorud-e Kuchak Rural District of the Central District in Sari County, Mazandaran province, Iran.

== Demographics ==
=== Population ===
At the time of the 2006 National Census, the village's population was 3,228 in 821 households. The following census in 2011 counted 3,102 people in 926 households. The 2016 census measured the population of the village as 3,964 people in 1,238 households, the most populous in its rural district.

Zoghal Chal and Hevela were incorporated into the 1st District of Sari city's municipality in 2017.
