= Akhor Sar =

Akhvor Sar آخورسر
- Village
- Location within Iran
- Coordinates: 36°35′03″N 53°01′20″E
- Country: Iran
- Province: Mazandaran
- County: Sari
- Bakhsh: Central
- Rural District: Mazkureh

Population (2016)
  - Total: 475
- Time zone: UTC+3:30 (IRST)

Akhvor Sar (Persian: آخورسر, also Romanized as Ākhvor Sar; also known as Ākhvor Kolā) is a village in Mazkureh Rural District, in the Central District of Sari County, Mazandaran Province, Iran. At the 2006 census, its population was 475, in 148 families. Up from 380 people in 2006.
