= Bandar Kheyl =

Village in Mazandaran province, Iran

Bandar Kheyl Persian: بندارخيل
- Village
- Location within Iran
- Coordinates: 36°35′25″N 53°02′00″E
- Country: Iran
- Province: Mazandaran
- County: Sari
- District: Central
- Rural District: Mazkureh

Population (2016)
  - Total: 6,365
- Time zone: UTC+3:30 (IRST)

Bandar Kheyl (Persian: بندارخيل) (Note: Also romanized as Bandār Kheyl; also known as Pendār Kheyl) is a village in, and the capital of, Mazkureh Rural District in the Central District of Sari County, Mazandaran province, Iran.

== Demographics ==
=== Population ===
At the time of the 2006 National Census, the village's population was 5,255 in 1,385 households. The following census in 2011 counted 5,273 people in 1,594 households. The 2016 census measured the population of the village as 6,365 people in 2,066 households.
