= Khan Abbasi =

Village in Mazandaran province, Iran

Khan Abbasi Persian: خان عباسی
- Village
- Location within Iran
- Coordinates: 36°30′48″N 53°05′35″E
- Country: Iran
- Province: Mazandaran
- County: Sari
- District: Central
- Rural District: Kolijan Rostaq-e Sofla

Population (2016)
  - Total: 247
- Time zone: UTC+3:30 (IRST)

Khan Abbasi (Persian: خان عباسی) (Note: Also romanized as Khān ‘Abbāsī) is a village in Kolijan Rostaq-e Sofla Rural District of the Central District in Sari County, Mazandaran province, Iran.

== Demographics ==
=== Population ===
At the time of the 2006 National Census, the village's population was 291 in 72 households. The following census in 2011 counted 279 people in 77 households. The 2016 census measured the population of the village as 247 people in 83 households.
