= Marmat (disambiguation) =

Marmat is a village in Mazandaran Province, Iran.

Marmat may also refer to:

- Marmat (tehsil), a village and tehsil in Doda district of Jammu and Kashmir, India

== See also ==
- Marmato, a 2014 American documentary film
