= Div Koti =

Village in Mazandaran province, Iran

Div Koti Persian: ديوكتي
- Village
- Location within Iran
- Coordinates: 36°36′00″N 53°03′17″E
- Country: Iran
- Province: Mazandaran
- County: Sari
- District: Central
- Rural District: Mazkureh

Population (2016)
  - Total: 677
- Time zone: UTC+3:30 (IRST)

Div Koti (Persian: ديوكتي) (Note: Also romanized as Dīv Kotī) is a village in Mazkureh Rural District of the Central District in Sari County, Mazandaran province, Iran.

== Demographics ==
=== Population ===
At the time of the 2006 National Census, the village's population was 658 in 179 households. The following census in 2011 counted 706 people in 226 households. The 2016 census measured the population of the village as 677 people in 230 households.
