= Zavar Mahalleh =

Zavar Mahalleh زوارمحله
- Village
- Location within Iran
- Coordinates: 36°38′00″N 53°02′00″E
- Country: Iran
- Province: Mazandaran
- County: Sari
- Bakhsh: Central
- Rural District: Mazkureh

Population (2016)
  - Total: 274
- Time zone: UTC+3:30 (IRST)

Zavar Mahalleh (Persian: زوارمحله, also Romanized as Zavār Maḩalleh) is a village in Mazkureh Rural District, in the Central District of Sari County, Mazandaran Province, Iran. At the 2006 census its population was 274, in 86 families. Up from 264 in 2006.
