= Bala Abdang =

Bala Abdang بالا آبدنگ
- Village
- Location within Iran
- Coordinates: 36°34′27″N 53°06′53″E
- Country: Iran
- Province: Mazandaran
- County: Sari
- Bakhsh: Central
- Rural District: Miandorud-e Kuchak

Population (2016)
  - Total: 364
- Time zone: UTC+3:30 (IRST)

Bala Abdang (Persian: بالا آبدنگ, also Romanized as Bālā Ābdāng) is a village in Miandorud-e Kuchak Rural District, in the Central District of Sari County, Mazandaran Province, Iran. At the 2016 census, its population was 364, in 118 families.
