= Daryek, Mazandaran =

Daryek دریک
- Village
- Location within Iran
- Coordinates: 36°35′59″N 53°03′29″E
- Country: Iran
- Province: Mazandaran
- County: Sari
- Bakhsh: Central
- Rural District: Mazkureh

Population (2016)
  - Total: 492
- Time zone: UTC+3:30 (IRST)

Daryek (Persian: دریک) is a village in Mazkureh Rural District, in the Central District of Sari County, Mazandaran province, Iran. At the 2016 census, its population was 492, in 167 families. Up from 331 people in 2006.
