= Valashid, Sari =

Valashed ولاشد
- village
- Location within Iran
- Coordinates: 36°32′47″N 53°11′06″E
- Country: Iran
- Province: Mazandaran
- County: Sari
- Bakhsh: Central
- Rural District: Miandorud-e Kuchak

Population (2006)
  - Total: 240
- Time zone: UTC+3:30 (IRST)

Valashed (Persian: ولاشيد, also Romanized as Valāshīd and Velāshīd; also known as Velesht) is a village in Miandorud-e Kuchak Rural District, in the Central District of Sari County, Mazandaran Province, Iran. At the 2016 census, its population was 228, in 74 families. Down from 240 in 2006.
