= Mofti Kola =

Village in Mazandaran province, Iran

Mofti Kola Persian: مفتي كلا
- Village
- Location within Iran
- Coordinates: 36°34′06″N 53°00′42″E
- Country: Iran
- Province: Mazandaran
- County: Sari
- District: Central
- Rural District: Mazkureh

Population (2016)
  - Total: 729
- Time zone: UTC+3:30 (IRST)

Mofti Kola (Persian: مفتي كلا) (Note: Also romanized as Moftī Kolā) is a village in Mazkureh Rural District of the Central District in Sari County, Mazandaran province, Iran.

== Demographics ==
=== Population ===
At the time of the 2006 National Census, the village's population was 506 in 130 households. The following census in 2011 counted 652 people in 189 households. The 2016 census measured the population of the village as 729 people in 223 households.
