= Asiab Sar, Sari =

Asiab Sar آسيابسر
- Village
- Location within Iran
- Coordinates: 36°32′19″N 53°05′44″E
- Country: Iran
- Province: Mazandaran
- County: Sari
- Bakhsh: Central
- Rural District: Miandorud-e Kuchak

Population (2006)
  - Total: 242
- Time zone: UTC+3:30 (IRST)

Asiab Sar (Persian: آسيابسر, also Romanized as Āsīāb Sar) is a village in Miandorud-e Kuchak Rural District, in the Central District of Sari County, Mazandaran Province, Iran. At the 2016 census, its population was 241, in 79 families.
