= Khvoshab, Mazandaran =

Khvoshab خوشاب
- Village
- Location within Iran
- Coordinates: 36°36′42″N 52°59′27″E
- Country: Iran
- Province: Mazandaran
- County: Sari
- Bakhsh: Central
- Rural District: Mazkureh

Population (2016)
  - Total: 331
- Time zone: UTC+3:30 (IRST)

Khvoshab (Persian: خوشاب, also Romanized as Khvoshāb; also known as Khvoshāb Pā’īn Maḩalleh) is a village in Mazkureh Rural District, in the Central District of Sari County, Mazandaran Province, Iran. At the 2016 census, its population was 331, in 111 families. Up from 291 in 2006.
