= Machak Posht =

Village in Mazandaran province, Iran

Machak Posht Persian: ماچك پشت
- Village
- Location within Iran
- Coordinates: 36°33′36″N 52°56′22″E
- Country: Iran
- Province: Mazandaran
- County: Sari
- District: Central
- Rural District: Esfivard-e Shurab

Population (2016)
  - Total: 1,863
- Time zone: UTC+3:30 (IRST)

Machak Posht (Persian: ماچك پشت) (Note: Also romanized as Māchak Posht) is a village in Esfivard-e Shurab Rural District of the Central District in Sari County, Mazandaran province, Iran.

== Demographics ==
=== Population ===
At the time of the 2006 National Census, the village's population was 1,999 in 579 households. The following census in 2011 counted 1,983 people in 636 households. The 2016 census measured the population of the village as 1,863 people in 651 households.
