= Khorramabad, Sari =

Khorramabad خرم آباد
- Village
- Location within Iran
- Coordinates: 36°36′46″N 53°01′27″E
- Country: Iran
- Province: Mazandaran
- County: Sari
- Bakhsh: Central
- Rural District: Mazkureh

Population (2016)
  - Total: 545
- Time zone: UTC+3:30 (IRST)

Khorramabad (Persian: خرم آباد, also Romanized as Khorramābād) is a village in Mazkureh Rural District, in the Central District of Sari County, Mazandaran Province, Iran. At the 2006 census, its population was 558, in 148 families. In 2016, it had 545 people in 182 households.
