= Ragan Dasht =

Village in Mazandaran province, Iran

Ragan Dasht Persian: رگندشت
- Village
- Location within Iran
- Coordinates: 36°34′30″N 53°01′00″E
- Country: Iran
- Province: Mazandaran
- County: Sari
- District: Central
- Rural District: Mazkureh

Population (2016)
  - Total: 615
- Time zone: UTC+3:30 (IRST)

Ragan Dasht (Persian: رگندشت) (Note: Also known as Lagan Dasht) is a village in Mazkureh Rural District of the Central District in Sari County, Mazandaran province, Iran.

== Demographics ==
=== Population ===
At the time of the 2006 National Census, the village's population was 500 in 126 households. The following census in 2011 counted 525 people in 145 households. The 2016 census measured the population of the village as 615 people in 193 households.
