= Ardeshir Mahalleh =

Ardeshir Mahalleh اردشيرمحله
- Village
- Location within Iran
- Coordinates: 36°37′55″N 53°06′30″E
- Country: Iran
- Province: Mazandaran
- County: Sari
- Bakhsh: Central
- Rural District: Miandorud-e Kuchak

Population (2016)
  - Total: 610
- Time zone: UTC+3:30 (IRST)

Ardeshir Mahalleh (Persian: اردشيرمحله, also Romanized as Ardeshīr Maḩalleh) is a village in Miandorud-e Kuchak Rural District, in the Central District of Sari County, Mazandaran Province, Iran. At the 2016 census, its population was 610, in 214 families. Up from 524 people in 2006.
