= Shahrak-e Farhangian =

Shahrak-e Farhangian شهرک فرهنگیان
- township
- Interactive map of Shahrak-e Farhangian
- Coordinates: 36°31′23.585″N 53°0′26.464″E
- Country: Iran
- Province: Mazandaran
- County: Sari
- Bakhsh: Central
- Rural District: Esfivard-e Shurab

Population (2016)
  - Total: 911
- Time zone: UTC+3:30 (IRST)

Shahrak-e Farhangian (Persian: شهرک فرهنگیان, also Romanized as Shahrak-e Farhangīān) is a township in Esfivard-e Shurab Rural District, in the Central District of Sari County, Mazandaran Province, Iran. At the 2006 census, its population was 1,103, in 278 families. In 2016, its population was 911 people in 298 households.
