= Qoroq, Sari =

Neighborhood in Mazandaran province, Iran

Qoroq Persian: قرق
- Neighborhood
- Location within Iran
- Coordinates: 36°35′26″N 53°03′09″E
- Country: Iran
- Province: Mazandaran
- County: Sari
- District: Central
- City: Sari

Population (2016)
  - Total: 10,704
- Time zone: UTC+3:30 (IRST)

Qoroq (Persian: قرق) is a neighborhood in the city of Sari in Sari County, Mazandaran province, Iran.

Formerly, it was a village in Mazkureh Rural District of the Central District.

== Demographics ==
=== Population ===
At the time of the 2006 National Census, the village's population was 6,046 in 1,634 households. The following census in 2011 counted 6,597 people in 1,935 households. The 2016 census measured the population of the village as 10,704 people in 3,407 households, the most populous in its rural district.

Qoroq became part of the city's urban area in 2017, and was fully incorporated in 2025.
