= Esbu Kola, Sari =

Village in Mazandaran province, Iran

Esbu Kola Persian: اسبوكلا
- Village
- Location within Iran
- Coordinates: 36°32′32″N 53°12′20″E
- Country: Iran
- Province: Mazandaran
- County: Sari
- District: Central
- Rural District: Miandorud-e Kuchak

Population (2016)
  - Total: 1,948
- Time zone: UTC+3:30 (IRST)

Esbu Kola (Persian: اسبوكلا) (Note: Also romanized as Asbū Kalā, Asbū Kolā, and Esbū Kolā) is a village in Miandorud-e Kuchak Rural District of the Central District in Sari County, Mazandaran province, Iran.

== Demographics ==
=== Population ===
At the time of the 2006 National Census, the village's population was 1,790 in 496 households. The following census in 2011 counted 1,954 people in 593 households. The 2016 census measured the population of the village as 1,948 people in 640 households.
