= Tazehabad-e Jehad =

Tazehabad-e Jehad تازه آباد جهاد
- Village
- Interactive map of Tazehabad-e Jehad
- Coordinates: 36°37′23″N 53°07′35″E
- Country: Iran
- Province: Mazandaran
- County: Sari
- Bakhsh: Central
- Rural District: Miandorud-e Kuchak

Population (2016)
  - Total: 454
- Time zone: UTC+3:30 (IRST)

Tazehabad-e Jehad (Persian: تازه آباد جهاد, also Romanized as Tāzehābād-e Jehād) is a village in Miandorud-e Kuchak Rural District, in the Central District of Sari County, Mazandaran Province, Iran. At the 2016 census, its population was 454, in 125 families.
