= Galleh Kola-ye Kar Kandeh =

Galleh Kola-ye Kar Kandeh گله كلاكاركنده
- Village
- Location within Iran
- Coordinates: 36°37′00″N 52°58′00″E
- Country: Iran
- Province: Mazandaran
- County: Sari
- Bakhsh: Central
- Rural District: Mazkureh

Population (2016)
  - Total: 209
- Time zone: UTC+3:30 (IRST)

Galleh Kola-ye Kar Kandeh (Persian: گله كلاكاركنده, also Romanized as Galleh Kolā-ye Kār Kandeh; also known as Galleh Kolā) is a village in Mazkureh Rural District, in the Central District of Sari County, Mazandaran Province, Iran. At the 2006 census, its population was 228, in 64 families. In 2016, it had 209 people in 73 households.
