= Tur Bedar =

Tur Bedar طوربدار
- Village
- Location within Iran
- Coordinates: 36°36′31″N 53°02′15″E
- Country: Iran
- Province: Mazandaran
- County: Sari
- Bakhsh: Central
- Rural District: Mazkureh

Population (2016)
  - Total: 129
- Time zone: UTC+3:30 (IRST)

Tur Bedar (Persian: طوربدار, also Romanized as Tūr Bedār and Tūrbedār) is a village in Mazkureh Rural District, in the Central District of Sari County, Mazandaran Province, Iran. At the 2006 census, its population was 145, in 39 families. In 2016, it had 129 people in 46 households.
