= Kord Kheyl, Esfivard-e Shurab =

Kord Kheyl كردخيل
- Village
- Location within Iran
- Coordinates: 36°30′24″N 53°00′27″E
- Country: Iran
- Province: Mazandaran
- County: Sari
- Bakhsh: Central
- Rural District: Esfivard-e Shurab

Population (2016)
  - Total: 967
- Time zone: UTC+3:30 (IRST)

Kord Kheyl (Persian: كردخيل) is a village in Esfivard-e Shurab Rural District, in the Central District of Sari County, Mazandaran Province, Iran. At the 2006 census, its population was 1,055, in 277 families. In 2016, it had 967 people in 351 households.
