= Malekabad-e Bala =

Malekabad-e Bala ملک آباد بالا
- Village
- Location within Iran
- Coordinates: 36°38′35″N 53°08′19″E
- Country: Iran
- Province: Mazandaran
- County: Sari
- Bakhsh: Central
- Rural District: Miandorud-e Kuchak

Population (2006)
  - Total: 400
- Time zone: UTC+3:30 (IRST)

Malekabad-e Bala (Persian: ملک آباد بالا, also Romanized as Malekābād-e Bālā) is a village in Miandorud-e Kuchak Rural District, in the Central District of Sari County, Mazandaran Province, Iran. At the 2016 census, its population was 391, in 150 families. Down from 400 in 2006.

It is located southwest of Malekabad-e Pain village.
