= Kharik =

Kharik may refer to:

- Khar Yek, village in Mazandaran, Iran
- Kharik, Bhagalpur, village in Bihar, India
