= Sorkh Kola, Sari =

Village in Mazandaran province, Iran

Sorkh Kola Persian: سرخ كلا
- Village
- Location within Iran
- Coordinates: 36°30′56″N 52°59′55″E
- Country: Iran
- Province: Mazandaran
- County: Sari
- District: Central
- Rural District: Esfivard-e Shurab

Population (2016)
  - Total: 2,039
- Time zone: UTC+3:30 (IRST)

Sorkh Kola (Persian: سرخ كلا) (Note: Also romanized as Sorkh Kalā and Sorkh Kolā; also known as Sorkh Kūlā) is a village in Esfivard-e Shurab Rural District of the Central District in Sari County, Mazandaran province, Iran.

== Demographics ==
=== Population ===
At the time of the 2006 National Census, the village's population was 1,656 in 434 households. The following census in 2011 counted 2,246 people in 659 households. The 2016 census measured the population of the village as 2,039 people in 649 households.
