= Jandin =

Coordinates: 36°42′10″N 53°08′09″E

Jandin جندين
- Village
- Interactive map of Jandin
- Country: Iran
- Province: Mazandaran
- County: Sari
- Bakhsh: Central
- Rural District: Miandorud-e Kuchak

Population (2016)
  - Total: 141
- Time zone: UTC+3:30 (IRST)

Jandin (Persian: جندين, also Romanized as Jandīn) is a village in Miandorud-e Kuchak Rural District, in the Central District of Sari County, Mazandaran Province, Iran. At the 2016 census, its population was 141, in 48 families. Down from 151 in 2006.
