= Gug Bagh =

Gug Bagh گوگ باغ
- Village
- Location within Iran
- Coordinates: 36°34′50″N 53°06′43″E
- Country: Iran
- Province: Mazandaran
- County: Sari
- Bakhsh: Central
- Rural District: Miandorud-e Kuchak

Population (2016)
  - Total: 309
- Time zone: UTC+3:30 (IRST)

Gug Bagh (Persian: گوگ باغ, also Romanized as Gūg Bāgh) is a village in Miandorud-e Kuchak Rural District, in the Central District of Sari County, Mazandaran Province, Iran. At the 2016 census, its population was 309, in 103 families. Up from 290 in 2006.
