= Gorji Kola =

Gorji Kola گرجي كلا
- Village
- Location within Iran
- Coordinates: 36°32′28″N 53°01′02″E
- Country: Iran
- Province: Mazandaran
- County: Sari
- Bakhsh: Central
- Rural District: Esfivard-e Shurab

Population (2016)
  - Total: 868
- Time zone: UTC+3:30 (IRST)

Gorji Kola (Persian: گرجي كلا, also Romanized as Gorjī Kolā) is a village in Esfivard-e Shurab Rural District, in the Central District of Sari County, Mazandaran Province, Iran. At the 2016 census, its population was 868, in 291 families. Up from 675 people in 2006.
