= Limun =

Limun ليمون
- Village
- Location within Iran
- Coordinates: 36°35′41″N 53°00′32″E
- Country: Iran
- Province: Mazandaran
- County: Sari
- Bakhsh: Central
- Rural District: Mazkureh

Population (2016)
  - Total: 365
- Time zone: UTC+3:30 (IRST)

Limun (Persian: ليمون, also Romanized as Līmūn) is a village in Mazkureh Rural District, in the Central District of Sari County, Mazandaran Province, Iran. At the 2016 census, its population was 365, in 117 families.
