= Malekabad-e Pain =

Malekabad-e Pain ملک آباد پایین
- Village
- Location within Iran
- Coordinates: 36°38′45″N 53°08′40″E
- Country: Iran
- Province: Mazandaran
- County: Sari
- Bakhsh: Central
- Rural District: Miandorud-e Kuchak

Population (2016)
  - Total: 410
- Time zone: UTC+3:30 (IRST)

Malekabad-e Pain (Persian: ملک آباد پایین, also Romanized as Malekābād-e Pā’īn) is a village in Miandorud-e Kuchak Rural District, in the Central District of Sari County, Mazandaran Province, Iran. At the 2016 census, its population was 410, in 150 families.

It is located northeast of Malekabad-e Bala village.
