= Kar Kondeh =

Kar Kondeh and Kar Kandeh (Persian: كاركنده) may refer to:

- Kar Kondeh, Golestan
- Kar Kandeh, Mazandaran
