= Bandafruz =

Bandafruz بندافروز
- Village
- Location within Iran
- Coordinates: 36°31′49″N 53°09′23″E
- Country: Iran
- Province: Mazandaran
- County: Sari
- Bakhsh: Central
- Rural District: Miandorud-e Kuchak

Population (2016)
  - Total: 232
- Time zone: UTC+3:30 (IRST)

Bandafruz (Persian: بندافروز, also Romanized as Bandafrūz and Bandaforūz) is a village in Miandorud-e Kuchak Rural District, in the Central District of Sari County, Mazandaran Province, Iran. At the 2016 census, its population was 232, in 76 families. Down from 274 in 2006.
