= Hajji Kola, Sari =

Hajji Kola حاجي كلا
- Village
- Location within Iran
- Coordinates: 36°31′26″N 52°57′06″E
- Country: Iran
- Province: Mazandaran
- County: Sari
- Bakhsh: Central
- Rural District: Esfivard-e Shurab

Population (2016)
  - Total: 766
- Time zone: UTC+3:30 (IRST)

Hajji Kola (Persian: حاجي كلا, also Romanized as Ḩājjī Kolā) is a village in Esfivard-e Shurab Rural District, in the Central District of Sari County, Mazandaran Province, Iran. At the 2006 census, its population was 873, in 221 families. In 2016, it had 766 people in 258 households.
