= Chenar Bon, Sari =

Chenar Bon چناربن
- Village
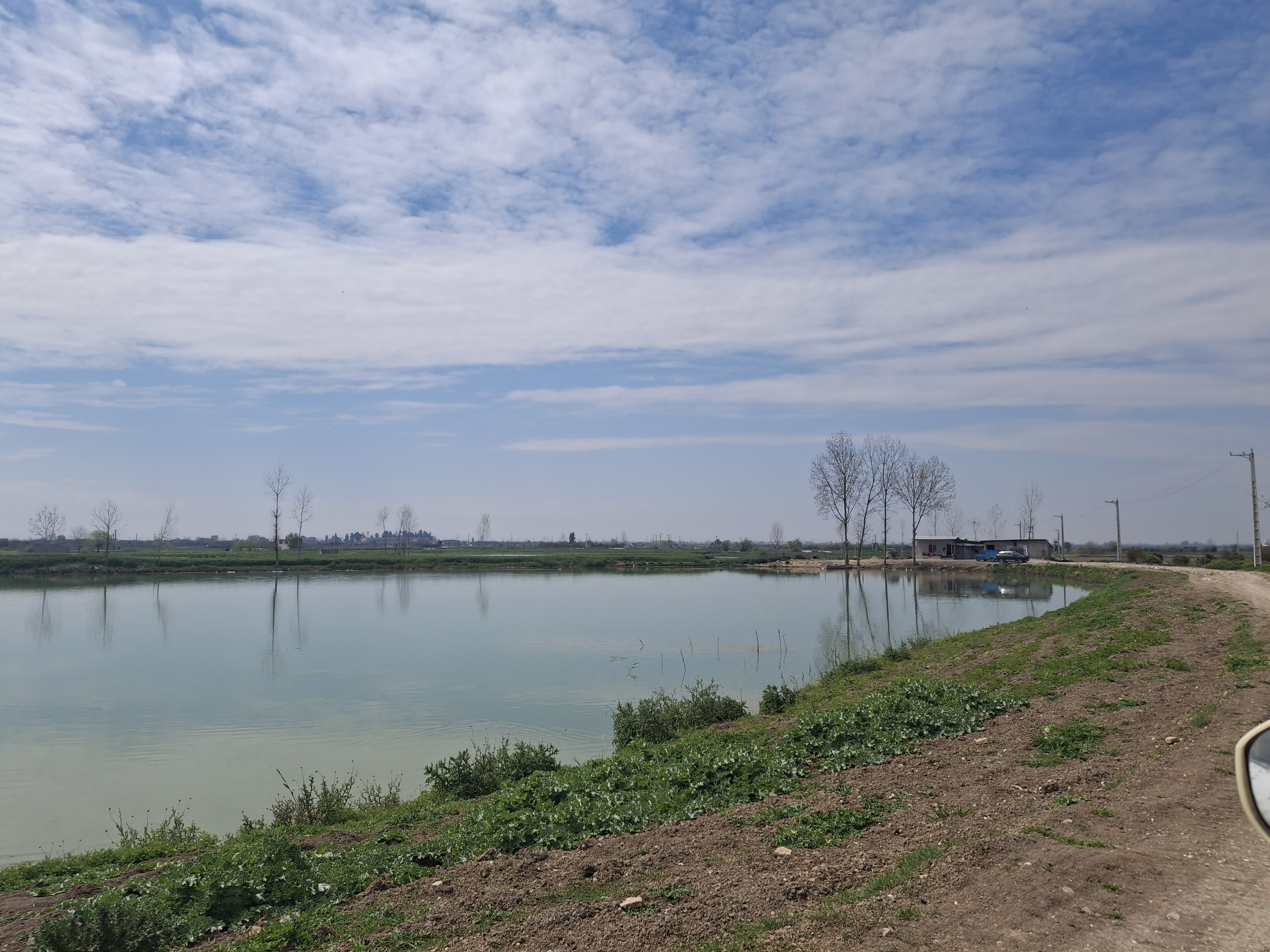

- Location within Iran
- Coordinates: 36°35′14″N 52°59′02″E
- Country: Iran
- Province: Mazandaran
- County: Sari
- Bakhsh: Central
- Rural District: Mazkureh

Population (2016)
  - Total: 325
- Time zone: UTC+3:30 (IRST)

Chenar Bon (Persian: چناربن, also Romanized as Chenār Bon) is a village in Mazkureh Rural District, in the Central District of Sari County, Mazandaran Province, Iran. At the 2006 census, its population was 348, in 103 families. In 2016, it had 325 people in 112 households.
