= Goleh Dun =

Village in Mazandaran province, Iran

Goleh Dun Persian: گله دون
- Village
- Location within Iran
- Coordinates: 36°34′43″N 53°05′28″E
- Country: Iran
- Province: Mazandaran
- County: Sari
- District: Central
- Rural District: Miandorud-e Kuchak

Population (2016)
  - Total: 2,351
- Time zone: UTC+3:30 (IRST)

Goleh Dun (Persian: گله دون) (Note: Also romanized as Gallehdūn and Goleh Dūn) is a village in Miandorud-e Kuchak Rural District of the Central District in Sari County, Mazandaran province, Iran. It is northeast of the city of Sari.

== Demographics ==
=== Population ===
At the time of the 2006 National Census, the village's population was 1,394 in 381 households. The following census in 2011 counted 1,576 people in 478 households. The 2016 census measured the population of the village as 2,351 people in 799 households.
