= Sharafabad, Mazandaran =

Neighborhood in Mazandaran province, Iran

Sharafabad Persian: شرف آباد
- Neighborhood
- Location within Iran
- Coordinates: 36°34′38″N 53°02′27″E
- Country: Iran
- Province: Mazandaran
- County: Sari
- District: Central
- City: Sari

Population (2016)
  - Total: 3,122
- Time zone: UTC+3:30 (IRST)

Sharafabad (Persian: شرف آباد) (Note: Also romanized as Sharafābād; also known as Pā’īn Sharafābād) is a suburban neighbourhood in the city of Sari in Mazandaran province, Iran.

Formerly, it was a village in Mazkureh Rural District of the Central District in Sari County. it is a northern suburb of the urban area in the city's 2nd municipal district.

== Demographics ==
=== Population ===
At the time of the 2006 National Census, the village's population was 2,843 in 764 households. The following census in 2011 counted 3,464 people in 1,042 households. The 2016 census measured the population of the village as 3,122 people in 1,024 households.

ُSharafabad became part of the city's urban area after the census.
