= Ali Koti =

Ali Koti علی کتی
- Village
- Location within Iran
- Coordinates: 36°34′02″N 53°00′11″E
- Country: Iran
- Province: Mazandaran
- County: Sari
- Bakhsh: Central
- Rural District: Mazkureh

Population (2016)
  - Total: 135
- Time zone: UTC+3:30 (IRST)

Ali Koti (Persian: علی کتی, also Romanized as ‘Alī Kotī; also known as Alkotī) is a village in Mazkureh Rural District, in the Central District of Sari County, Mazandaran Province, Iran. At the 2016 census, its population was 135, in 46 families.
