= Bala Golema =

Bala Golema بالاگلما
- Village
- Location within Iran
- Coordinates: 36°35′53″N 53°06′41″E
- Country: Iran
- Province: Mazandaran
- County: Sari
- Bakhsh: Central
- Rural District: Miandorud-e Kuchak

Population (2006)
  - Total: 766
- Time zone: UTC+3:30 (IRST)

Bala Golema (Persian: بالاگلما, also Romanized as Bālā Golemā; also known as Golemā-ye Bālā and Golmā-ye Bālā) is a village in Miandorud-e Kuchak Rural District, in the Central District of Sari County, Mazandaran Province, Iran. At the 2016 census, its population was 704, in 237 families. Down from 766 in 2006.

It is located south of Pain Golema village.
