= Sang Tarashan, Mazandaran =

Village in Mazandaran province, Iran

Sang Tarashan Persian: سنگ تراشان
- Village
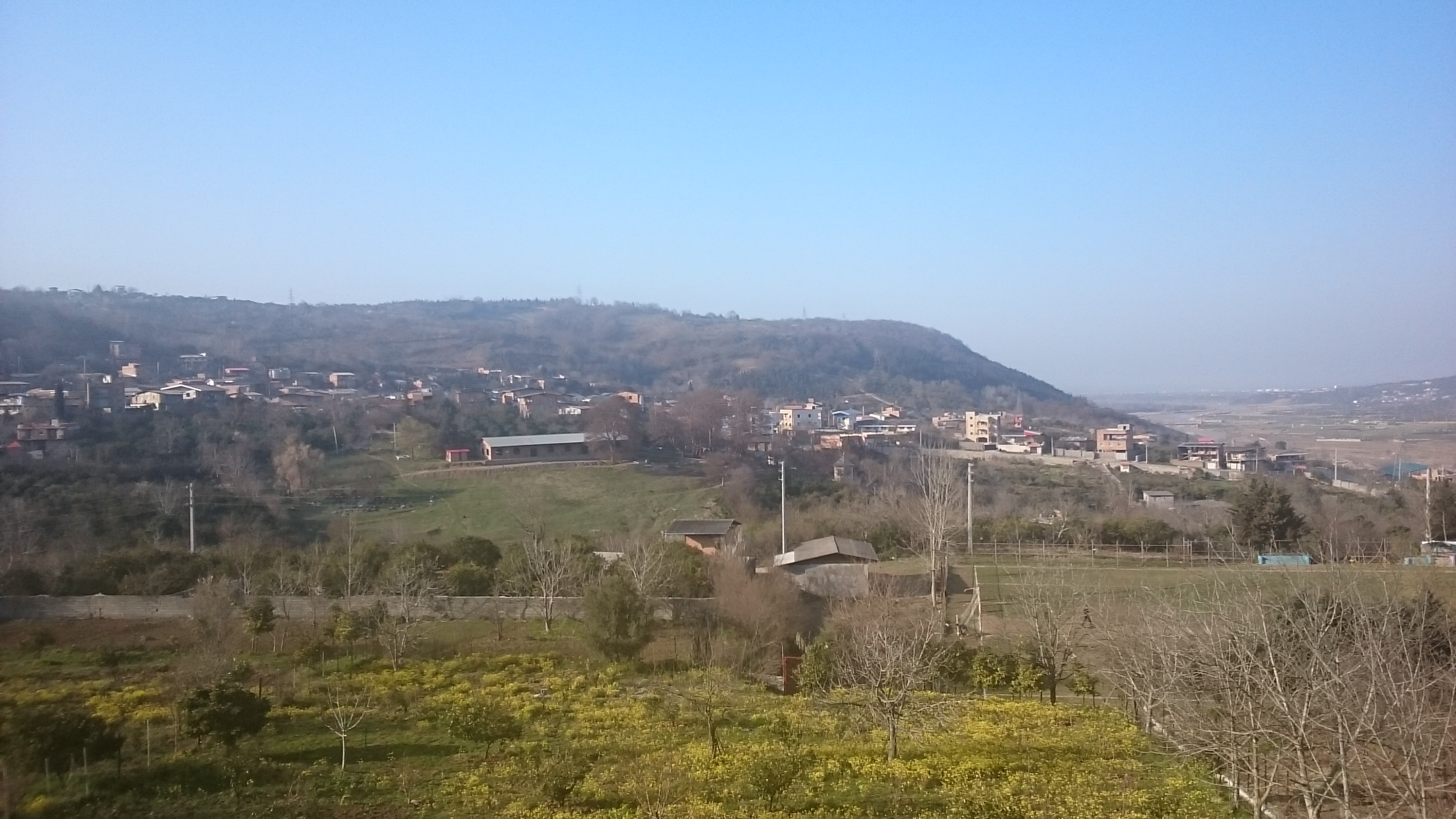
- The village of Sang Tarashan

- Location within Iran
- Coordinates: 36°29′12″N 53°04′29″E
- Country: Iran
- Province: Mazandaran
- County: Sari
- District: Central
- Rural District: Kolijan Rostaq-e Sofla

Population (2016)
  - Total: 1,712
- Time zone: UTC+3:30 (IRST)

Sang Tarashan (Persian: سنگ تراشان) (Note: Also romanized as Sang Tarāshān) is a village in, and the capital of, Kolijan Rostaq-e Sofla Rural District in the Central District of Sari County, Mazandaran province, Iran.

== Demographics ==
=== Population ===
At the time of the 2006 National Census, the village's population was 1,718 in 437 households. The following census in 2011 counted 1,752 people in 540 households. The 2016 census measured the population of the village as 1,712 people in 574 households.
