= Vared Mahalleh =

Village in Mazandaran province, Iran

Vared Mahalleh Persian: واردمحله
- Village
- Location within Iran
- Coordinates: 36°29′29″N 53°07′39″E
- Country: Iran
- Province: Mazandaran
- County: Sari
- District: Central
- Rural District: Kolijan Rostaq-e Sofla

Population (2016)
  - Total: 662
- Time zone: UTC+3:30 (IRST)

Vared Mahalleh (Persian: واردمحله) (Note: Also romanized as Vāred Maḩalleh; also known as Vāred and Vāred Maḩalleh-ye Pā’īn Kūlā) is a village in Kolijan Rostaq-e Sofla Rural District of the Central District in Sari County, Mazandaran province, Iran.

== Demographics ==
=== Population ===
At the time of the 2006 National Census, the village's population was 682 in 166 households. The following census in 2011 counted 649 people in 213 households. The 2016 census measured the population of the village as 662 people in 218 households.
