= Deza, Iran =

Deza (Persian: دزا) in Iran may refer to:

- Bala Deza
- Pain Deza
