= Kalak, Sari =

Kalak کلاک
- Village
- Interactive map of Kalak
- Coordinates: 36°35′50.478″N 53°5′32.561″E
- Country: Iran
- Province: Mazandaran
- County: Sari
- Bakhsh: Central
- Rural District: Miandorud-e Kuchak

Population (2016)
  - Total: 60
- Time zone: UTC+3:30 (IRST)

Kalak (Persian: کلاک, also Romanized as Kalāk) is a village in Miandorud-e Kuchak Rural District, in the Central District of Sari County, Mazandaran Province, Iran. At the 2016 census, its population was 60, in 21 families.
