= Miar Kola, Sari =

Village in Mazandaran province, Iran

Miar Kola Persian: مياركلا
- Village
- Location within Iran
- Coordinates: 36°35′36″N 52°56′04″E
- Country: Iran
- Province: Mazandaran
- County: Sari
- District: Central
- Rural District: Mazkureh

Population (2016)
  - Total: 1,514
- Time zone: UTC+3:30 (IRST)

Miar Kola (Persian: مياركلا) (Note: Also romanized as Mīār Kolā) is a village in Mazkureh Rural District of the Central District in Sari County, Mazandaran province, Iran.

== Demographics ==
=== Population ===
At the time of the 2006 National Census, the village's population was 1,458 in 405 households. The following census in 2011 counted 1,473 people in 452 households. The 2016 census measured the population of the village as 1,514 people in 498 households.
