= Rud Posht, Sari =

Rud Posht رودپشت
- Village
- Location within Iran
- Coordinates: 36°31′33″N 53°00′58″E
- Country: Iran
- Province: Mazandaran
- County: Sari
- Bakhsh: Central
- Rural District: Esfivard-e Shurab

Government

Population (2016)
  - Total: 497
- Time zone: UTC+3:30 (IRST)

Rud Posht (Persian: رودپشت, also Romanized as Rūd Posht) is a village in Esfivard-e Shurab Rural District, in the Central District of Sari County, Mazandaran Province, Iran. At the 2016 census, its population was 497, in 171 families.
