= Dowlatabad, Mazandaran =

Village in Mazandaran province, Iran

Dowlatabad Persian: دولت اباد
- Village
- Location within Iran
- Coordinates: 36°36′11″N 53°00′48″E
- Country: Iran
- Province: Mazandaran
- County: Sari
- District: Central
- Rural District: Mazkureh

Population (2016)
  - Total: 612
- Time zone: UTC+3:30 (IRST)

Dowlatabad (Persian: دولت اباد) (Note: Also romanized as Dowlatābād) is a village in Mazkureh Rural District of the Central District in Sari County, Mazandaran province, Iran.

== Demographics ==
=== Population ===
At the time of the 2006 National Census, the village's population was 531 in 137 households. The following census in 2011 counted 635 people in 209 households. The 2016 census measured the population of the village as 612 people in 197 households.
