= Term, Iran =

Village in Mazandaran province, Iran

Term Persian: ترم
- Village
- Location within Iran
- Coordinates: 36°28′29″N 53°04′47″E
- Country: Iran
- Province: Mazandaran
- County: Sari
- District: Central
- Rural District: Kolijan Rostaq-e Sofla

Population (2016)
  - Total: 368
- Time zone: UTC+3:30 (IRST)

Term (Persian: ترم) (Note: Also known as Term Şaḩrā) is a village in Kolijan Rostaq-e Sofla Rural District of the Central District in Sari County, Mazandaran province, Iran.

== Demographics ==
=== Population ===
At the time of the 2006 National Census, the village's population was 420 in 101 households. The following census in 2011 counted 413 people in 120 households. The 2016 census measured the population of the village as 368 people in 127 households.
