= Khar Kesh, Mazandaran =

Village in Mazandaran province, Iran

Khar Kesh Persian: خاركش
- Village
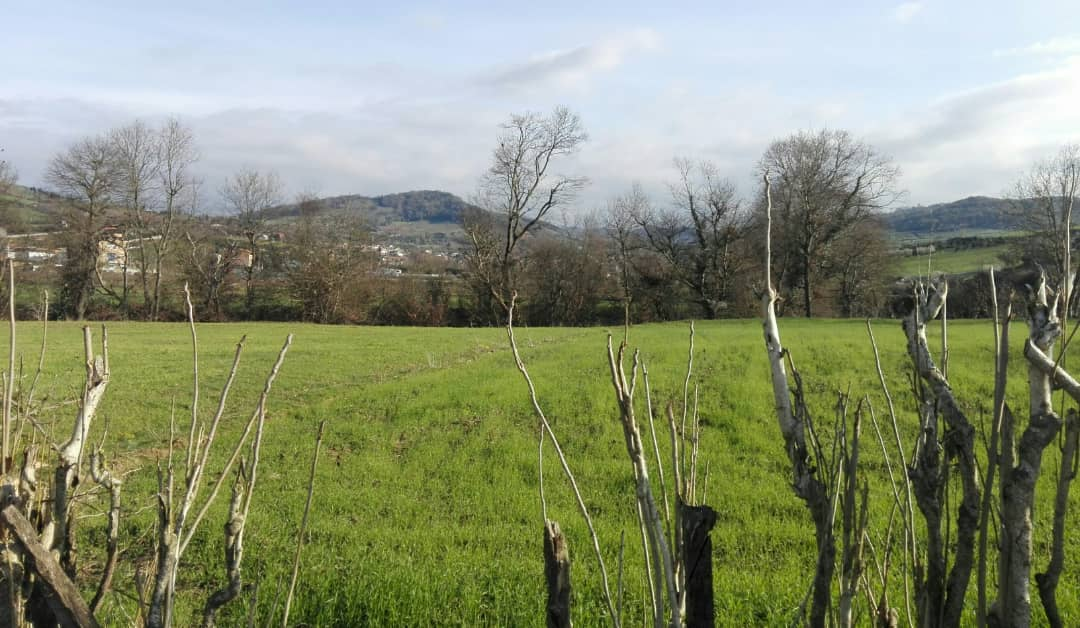
- The village of Khar Kesh

- Location within Iran
- Coordinates: 36°30′51″N 53°08′51″E
- Country: Iran
- Province: Mazandaran
- County: Sari
- District: Central
- Rural District: Miandorud-e Kuchak

Population (2016)
  - Total: 1,008
- Time zone: UTC+3:30 (IRST)

Khar Kesh (Persian: خاركش) (Note: Also romanized as Khār Kesh and Khārkash) is a village in Miandorud-e Kuchak Rural District of the Central District in Sari County, Mazandaran province, Iran.

== Demographics ==
=== Population ===
At the time of the 2006 National Census, the village's population was 1,144 in 301 households. The following census in 2011 counted 1,020 people in 319 households. The 2016 census measured the population of the village as 1,008 people in 340 households.
