= Hemmatabad, Sari =

Hemmatabad همت آباد
- Village
- Location within Iran
- Coordinates: 36°35′17″N 53°07′38″E
- Country: Iran
- Province: Mazandaran
- County: Sari
- Bakhsh: Central
- Rural District: Miandorud-e Kuchak

Population (2016)
  - Total: 919
- Time zone: UTC+3:30 (IRST)

Hemmatabad (Persian: همت آباد, also romanized as Hemmatābād) is a village in Miandorud-e Kuchak Rural District, in the Central District of Sari County, Mazandaran Province, Iran. At the 2016 census, its population was 919, in 329 families. Up from 910 in 2006.
