= Mian Rud, Sari =

Village in Mazandaran province, Iran

Mian Rud Persian: ميانرود
- Village
- Location within Iran
- Coordinates: 36°32′14″N 53°03′17″E
- Country: Iran
- Province: Mazandaran
- County: Sari
- District: Central
- Rural District: Esfivard-e Shurab

Population (2016)
  - Total: 1,087
- Time zone: UTC+3:30 (IRST)

Mian Rud (Persian: ميانرود) (Note: Also romanized as Mīān Rūd) is a village in Esfivard-e Shurab Rural District of the Central District in Sari County, Mazandaran province, Iran.

== Demographics ==
=== Population ===
At the time of the 2006 National Census, the village's population was 675 in 181 households. The following census in 2011 counted 929 people in 280 households. The 2016 census measured the population of the village as 1,087 people in 362 households.
