= Hajjiabad, Mazkureh =

Hajjiabad حاجی آباد
- Village
- Location within Iran
- Coordinates: 36°35′31″N 52°59′46″E
- Country: Iran
- Province: Mazandaran
- County: Sari
- Bakhsh: Central
- Rural District: Mazkureh

Population (2016)
  - Total: 240
- Time zone: UTC+3:30 (IRST)

Hajjiabad (Persian: حاجی آباد, also Romanized as Ḩājjīābād) is a village in Mazkureh Rural District, in the Central District of Sari County, Mazandaran Province, Iran. At the 2016 census, its population was 240, in 80 families. Up from 192 people in 2006.
