= Dangsarak, Sari =

Village in Mazandaran province, Iran

Dangsarak Persian: دنگ سرک
- Village
- Location within Iran
- Coordinates: 36°39′14″N 53°09′27″E
- Country: Iran
- Province: Mazandaran
- County: Sari
- District: Central
- Rural District: Miandorud-e Kuchak

Population (2016)
  - Total: 1,049
- Time zone: UTC+3:30 (IRST)

Dangsarak (Persian: دنگ سرک) (Note: Also romanized as Dengesarak; also known as Dengesarak-e Do) is a village in Miandorud-e Kuchak Rural District of the Central District in Sari County, Mazandaran province, Iran.

== Demographics ==
=== Population ===
At the time of the 2006 National Census, the village's population was 1,176 in 335 households. The following census in 2011 counted 1,053 people in 323 households. The 2016 census measured the population of the village as 1,049 people in 380 households.
