= Khonarabad =

Khonarabad خنارآباد
- Village
- Interactive map of Khonarabad
- Coordinates: 36°30′1.25″N 52°59′34.25″E
- Country: Iran
- Province: Mazandaran
- County: Sari
- Bakhsh: Central
- Rural District: Esfivard-e Shurab

Population (2016)
  - Total: 111
- Time zone: UTC+3:30 (IRST)

Khonarabad (Persian: خنارآباد, also Romanized as Khonārābād) is a village in Esfivard-e Shurab Rural District, in the Central District of Sari County, Mazandaran Province, Iran. At the 2016 census, its population was 111, in 39families. Down from 125 in 2006.
