= Moqam =

Moqam مقام
- Village
- Location within Iran
- Coordinates: 36°35′43″N 53°04′56″E
- Country: Iran
- Province: Mazandaran
- County: Sari
- Bakhsh: Central
- Rural District: Mazkureh

Population (2016)
  - Total: 344
- Time zone: UTC+3:30 (IRST)

Moqam (Persian: مقام, also Romanized as Moqām) is a village in Mazkureh Rural District, in the Central District of Sari County, Mazandaran Province, Iran. At the 2016 census, its population was 344, in 122 families. Up from 277 people in 2006.
