= Mahdasht, Mazandaran =

Village in Mazandaran province, Iran

Mahdasht Persian: مهدشت
- Neighborhood
- Location within Iran
- Coordinates: 36°31′06″N 53°04′07″E
- Country: Iran
- Province: Mazandaran
- County: Sari
- District: Central
- City: Sari

Population (2016)
  - Total: 4,220
- Time zone: UTC+3:30 (IRST)

Mahdasht (Persian: مهدشت) is a southern suburb of Sari city in Mazandaran province, Iran.

Formerly, it was a village in Kolijan Rostaq-e Sofla Rural District, in the Central District of Sari County.

== Demographics ==
=== Population ===
At the time of the 2016 National Census, its population was 4,220 people in 1,266 households, the most populous village in its rural district. Mahdasht was incorporated into the 3rd District of Sari city's Municipality after the census.
