= Sheykh Kola =

Sheykh Kola شيخ كلا
- Village
- Location within Iran
- Coordinates: 36°32′58″N 53°00′11″E
- Country: Iran
- Province: Mazandaran
- County: Sari
- Bakhsh: Central
- Rural District: Esfivard-e Shurab

Population (2016)
  - Total: 593
- Time zone: UTC+3:30 (IRST)

Sheykh Kola (Persian: شيخ كلا, also Romanized as Sheykh Kolā) is a village in Esfivard-e Shurab Rural District, in the Central District of Sari County, Mazandaran Province, Iran. At the 2016 census, its population was 593, in 193 families.
