= Barar Deh, Sari =

Barar Deh برارده
- Village
- Location within Iran
- Coordinates: 36°41′05″N 53°09′47″E
- Country: Iran
- Province: Mazandaran
- County: Sari
- Bakhsh: Central
- Rural District: Miandorud-e Kuchak

Population (2006)
  - Total: 247
- Time zone: UTC+3:30 (IRST)

Barar Deh (Persian: برارده, also Romanized as Barār Deh and Barārdeh) is a village in Miandorud-e Kuchak Rural District, in the Central District of Sari County, Mazandaran Province, Iran. At the 2016 census, its population was 241, in 80 families.
