= Sahebi =

Sahebi صاحبی
- Village
- Location within Iran
- Coordinates: 36°40′41″N 53°08′37″E
- Country: Iran
- Province: Mazandaran
- County: Sari
- Bakhsh: Central
- Rural District: Miandorud-e Kuchak

Population (2006)
  - Total: 911
- Time zone: UTC+3:30 (IRST)

Sahebi (Persian: صاحبی, also Romanized as Sâhebī) is a village in Miandorud-e Kuchak Rural District, in the Central District of Sari County, Mazandaran Province, Iran. At the 2016 census, its population was 761, in 275 families. Down from 911 people in 2006.
