= Deza =

Deza may refer to:

== People ==
- Alfredo Deza (high jumper) (born 1979), former Peruvian athlete specializing in the high jump
- Davis Deza (born 1991), Peruvian football midfielder
- Elena Deza (born 1961), French-Russian mathematician
- Diego Deza (1444–1523), inquisitor
- Jean Deza (born 1993), Peruvian footballer
- Michel Deza (1939–2016), Soviet and French mathematician
- Pedro de Deza (1520–1600), Spanish Roman Catholic cardinal and bishop

== Places ==
- O Deza, a region in Spain
- Deza, Soria, a municipality in Soria Province, Spain
- Deza, Iran (disambiguation)

== Other ==
- Swiss Agency for Development and Cooperation, agency in Switzerland, in German Direktion für Entwicklung und Zusammenarbeit (DEZA)
