= Pain Kula, Iran =

Village in Mazandaran province, Iran

Pain Kula Persian: پايين كولا
- Village
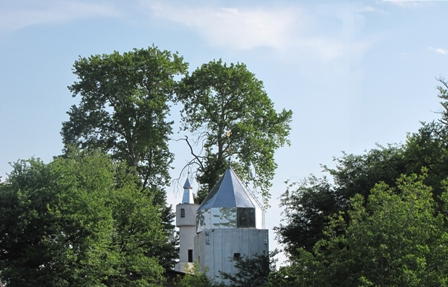
- The village of Pain Kula

- Location within Iran
- Coordinates: 36°29′17″N 53°07′32″E
- Country: Iran
- Province: Mazandaran
- County: Sari
- District: Central
- Rural District: Kolijan Rostaq-e Sofla

Population (2016)
  - Total: 597
- Time zone: UTC+3:30 (IRST)

Pain Kula (Persian: پايين كولا) (Note: Also romanized as Paein Koola, Pā’īn Koolā, and Pā’īn Kūlā; also known as Pā’īn Kolā) is a village in Kolijan Rostaq-e Sofla Rural District of the Central District in Sari County, Mazandaran province, Iran.

== Demographics ==
=== Population ===
At the time of the 2006 National Census, the village's population was 589 in 162 households. The following census in 2011 counted 651 people in 210 households. The 2016 census measured the population of the village as 597 people in 200 households.
