= Now Deh, Miandorud-e Kuchak =

Now Deh نوده
- Village
- Location within Iran
- Coordinates: 36°31′24″N 53°05′53″E
- Country: Iran
- Province: Mazandaran
- County: Sari
- Bakhsh: Central
- Rural District: Miandorud-e Kuchak

Population (2016)
  - Total: 254
- Time zone: UTC+3:30 (IRST)

Now Deh (Persian: نوده) is a village in Miandorud-e Kuchak Rural District, in the Central District of Sari County, Mazandaran Province, Iran. At the 2016 census, its population was 254, in 83 families. Up from 184 people in 2006.
