= Ab Bandan Kash =

Ab Bandan Kash اببندانكش (Persian) آبندون کش (Mazandarani)
- village
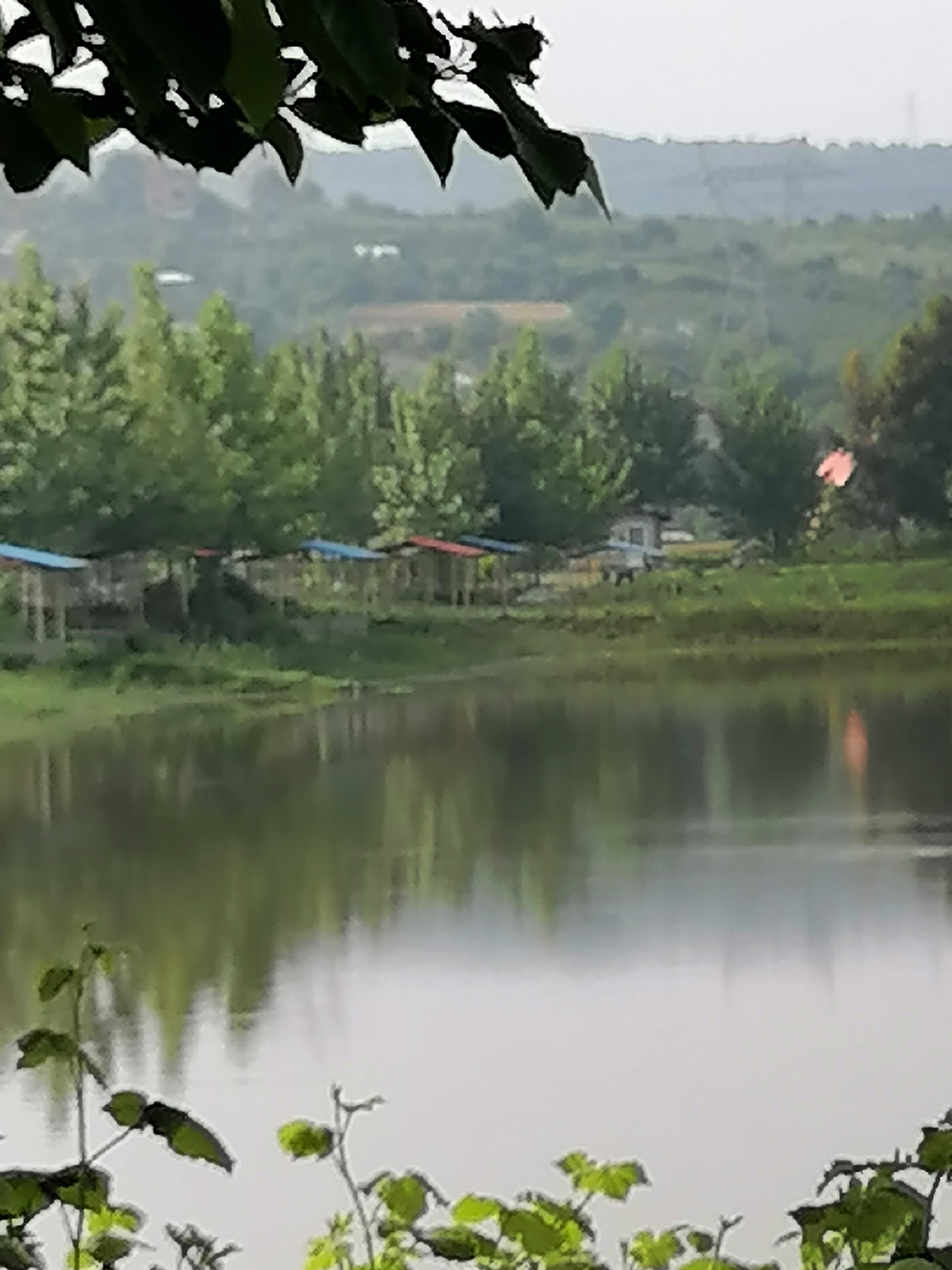

- Location within Iran
- Coordinates: 36°32′10″N 53°06′44″E
- Country: Iran
- Province: Mazandaran
- County: Sari
- Bakhsh: Central
- Rural District: Miandorud-e Kuchak

Population (2016)
  - Total: 617
- Time zone: UTC+3:30 (IRST)

Ab Bandan Kash (Persian: اببندانكش, also Romanized as Āb Bandān Kash, Mazandarani: Ābēndun Kaš) is a village in Miandorud-e Kuchak Rural District, in the Central District of Sari County, Mazandaran province, Iran. At the 2016 census, its population was 617, in 202 families. up from 604 in 2006.
