= Qadi Kola, Miandorud-e Kuchak =

Qadi Kola قاديكلا
- Village
- Location within Iran
- Coordinates: 36°40′27″N 53°06′26″E
- Country: Iran
- Province: Mazandaran
- County: Sari
- Bakhsh: Central
- Rural District: Miandorud-e Kuchak

Population (2006)
  - Total: 972
- Time zone: UTC+3:30 (IRST)

Qadi Kola (Persian: قاديكلا, also Romanized as Qādī Kolā and Qādī Kalā) is a village in Miandorud-e Kuchak Rural District, in the Central District of Sari County, Mazandaran Province, Iran. At the 2016 census, its population was 949, in 331 families. Down from 972 in 2006.
