= Aghur Kash =

Village in Tehran province, Iran

Aghur Kash Persian: آغورکش
- Village
- Location within Iran
- Coordinates: 36°34′10.72″N 53°01′7.92″E
- Country: Iran
- Province: Mazandaran
- County: Sari
- District: Central
- Rural District: Mazkureh

Population (2016)
  - Total: 359
- Time zone: UTC+3:30 (IRST)

Aghur Kash (Persian: آغورکش) (Note: also romanized as Āghur Kash) is a village in Mazkureh Rural District in the Central District of Sari County, Mazandaran province, Iran.

At the time of the 2011 census, Aghur Kash had a population of 308 people in 89 households. The 2016 census measured the population of the village as 359 people in 118 households.
