= Salu Kola =

Salu Kola سلوكلا
- Village
- Location within Iran
- Coordinates: 36°32′57″N 52°59′28″E
- Country: Iran
- Province: Mazandaran
- County: Sari
- Bakhsh: Central
- Rural District: Esfivard-e Shurab

Population (2016)
  - Total: 469
- Time zone: UTC+3:30 (IRST)

Salu Kola (Persian: سلوكلا, also Romanized as Salū Kolā) is a village in Esfivard-e Shurab Rural District, in the Central District of Sari County, Mazandaran Province, Iran. At the 2016 census, its population was 469, in 151 families. Up from 410 people in 2006.
