= Dimturan =

Dimturan دیم توران
- Village
- Location within Iran
- Coordinates: 36°35′37″N 53°04′14″E
- Country: Iran
- Province: Mazandaran
- County: Sari
- Bakhsh: Central
- Rural District: Mazkureh

Population (2016)
  - Total: 329
- Time zone: UTC+3:30 (IRST)

Dimturan (Persian: دیم توران, also Romanized as Dīmţūrān; also known as Dim Tooran and Dīmţorūn) is a village in Mazkureh Rural District, in the Central District of Sari County, Mazandaran Province, Iran. At the 2016 census, its population was 329, in 107 families. Up from 255 people in 2006.
