= Zargar Bagh =

Zargar Bagh زرگرباغ
- Village
- Location within Iran
- Coordinates: 36°35′43″N 53°02′33″E
- Country: Iran
- Province: Mazandaran
- County: Sari
- Bakhsh: Central
- Rural District: Mazkureh

Population (2016)
  - Total: 315
- Time zone: UTC+3:30 (IRST)

Zargar Bagh (Persian: زرگرباغ, also Romanized as Zargar Bāgh) is a village in Mazkureh Rural District, in the Central District of Sari County, Mazandaran Province, Iran. At the 2016 census, its population was 315, in 109 families. Up from 257 in 2006.
