= Pol-e Gardan =

Neighborhood in Mazandaran province, Iran

Pol-e Gardan Persian: پل گردن
- Neighborhood
- Location within Iran
- Coordinates: 36°32′42″N 53°04′32″E
- Country: Iran
- Province: Mazandaran
- County: Sari
- District: Central
- City: Sari

Population (2016)
  - Total: 2,819
- Time zone: UTC+3:30 (IRST)

Pol-e Gardan (Persian: پل گردن) (Note: Also romanized as Pol Gardan and Pol-e Gardan) is a southern suburb of Sari city in Mazandaran province, Iran.

Formerly, it was a village in Kolijan Rostaq-e Sofla Rural District, in the Central District of Sari County.

== Demographics ==
=== Population ===
At the time of the 2006 National Census, the village's population was 1,091 in 294 households. The following census in 2011 counted 2,375 people in 663 households. The 2016 census measured the population of the village as 2,819 people in 784 households.

Pol-e Gardan was incorporated into the 3rd District of Sari city's Municipality after the census.
