= Talu Bagh =

Talu Bagh تلوباغ
- Village
- Location within Iran
- Coordinates: 36°31′53″N 53°01′42″E
- Country: Iran
- Province: Mazandaran
- County: Sari
- Bakhsh: Central
- Rural District: Esfivard-e Shurab

Population (2016)
  - Total: 917
- Time zone: UTC+3:30 (IRST)

Talu Bagh (Persian: تلوباغ, also Romanized as Talū Bāgh) is a village in Esfivard-e Shurab Rural District, in the Central District of Sari County, Mazandaran Province, Iran. At the 2006 census, its population was 957, in 234 families. In 2016, it had 917 people in 307 households.
