= Shahab Lilam =

Shahab Lilam شهاب ليلم
- Village
- Location within Iran
- Coordinates: 36°37′17″N 53°00′14″E
- Country: Iran
- Province: Mazandaran
- County: Sari
- Bakhsh: Central
- Rural District: Mazkureh

Population (2016)
  - Total: 554
- Time zone: UTC+3:30 (IRST)

Shahab Lilam (Persian: شهاب ليلم, also Romanized as Shahāb Līlam) is a village in Mazkureh Rural District, in the Central District of Sari County, Mazandaran Province, Iran. At the 2006 census, its population was 607, in 160 families. In 2016, it had 554 people in 188 households.
