= Ahudasht =

Ahudasht or Ahu Dasht (Persian: اهودشت) may refer to:

- Ahu Dasht, Nur, Mazandaran Province
- Ahu Dasht, Sari, Mazandaran Province
- Ahu Dasht, alternate name of Ahi Dasht, Sari County, Mazandaran Province
- Ahudasht Rural District, in Khuzestan Province
