= Espurez =

Espurez اسپورز
- Village
- Location within Iran
- Coordinates: 36°31′58″N 53°08′15″E
- Country: Iran
- Province: Mazandaran
- County: Sari
- Bakhsh: Central
- Rural District: Miandorud-e Kuchak

Population (2016)
  - Total: 681
- Time zone: UTC+3:30 (IRST)

Espurez (Persian: اسپورز, also Romanized as Espūrez; also known as Esbūrez, Esbūzar, and Ezbūroz) is a village in Miandorud-e Kuchak Rural District, in the Central District of Sari County, Mazandaran Province, Iran. At the 2016 census, its population was 681, in 234 families. Up from 606 in 2006.
