= Gileh Kola-ye Olya =

Gileh Kola-ye Olya گيله كلا عليا
- Village
- Location within Iran
- Coordinates: 36°30′01″N 52°59′44″E
- Country: Iran
- Province: Mazandaran
- County: Sari
- Bakhsh: Central
- Rural District: Esfivard-e Shurab

Population (2016)
  - Total: 368
- Time zone: UTC+3:30 (IRST)

Gileh Kola-ye Olya (Persian: گيله كلا عليا, also Romanized as Gīleh Kolā-ye ‘Olyā; also known as Gīleh Kolā) is a village in Esfivard-e Shurab Rural District, in the Central District of Sari County, Mazandaran Province, Iran. At the 2016 census, its population was 368, in 120 families. Up from 333 in 2006.
