= Yur Mahalleh, Sari =

Yur Mahalleh يورمحله
- Village
- Location within Iran
- Coordinates: 36°34′10″N 52°56′51″E
- Country: Iran
- Province: Mazandaran
- County: Sari
- Bakhsh: Central
- Rural District: Esfivard-e Shurab

Population (2016)
  - Total: 201
- Time zone: UTC+3:30 (IRST)

Yur Mahalleh (Persian: يورمحله, also Romanized as Yūr Maḩalleh; also known as Yūr) is a village in Esfivard-e Shurab Rural District, in the Central District of Sari County, Mazandaran Province, Iran. At the 2006 census, its population was 212, in 56 families. In 2016, it had 201 people in 70 households.
