= Hoseynabad, Sari =

Hoseynabad حسين آباد
- Village
- Location within Iran
- Coordinates: 36°35′19″N 53°06′50″E
- Country: Iran
- Province: Mazandaran
- County: Sari
- Bakhsh: Central
- Rural District: Miandorud-e Kuchak

Population (2016)
  - Total: 460
- Time zone: UTC+3:30 (IRST)

Hoseynabad (Persian: حسين آباد, also Romanized as Ḩoseynābād) is a village in Miandorud-e Kuchak Rural District, in the Central District of Sari County, Mazandaran Province, Iran. At the 2016 census, its population was 460, in 158 families. Up from 448 in 2006.
