= San Kheyl =

Village in Mazandaran province, Iran

San Kheyl Persian: سانخيل
- Village
- Location within Iran
- Coordinates: 36°29′08″N 53°08′10″E
- Country: Iran
- Province: Mazandaran
- County: Sari
- District: Central
- Rural District: Kolijan Rostaq-e Sofla

Population (2016)
  - Total: 309
- Time zone: UTC+3:30 (IRST)

San Kheyl (Persian: سانخيل) (Note: Also romanized as Sān Kheyl; also known as Sāneh Kheyl) is a village in Kolijan Rostaq-e Sofla Rural District of the Central District in Sari County, Mazandaran province, Iran.

== Demographics ==
=== Population ===
At the time of the 2006 National Census, the village's population was 314 in 72 households. The following census in 2011 counted 294 people in 83 households. The 2016 census measured the population of the village as 309 people in 100 households.
