= Lak Dasht, Sari =

Lak Dasht لاک دشت
- Village
- Location within Iran
- Coordinates: 36°32′49″N 53°05′28″E
- Country: Iran
- Province: Mazandaran
- County: Sari
- Bakhsh: Central
- Rural District: Miandorud-e Kuchak

Population (2006)
  - Total: 311
- Time zone: UTC+3:30 (IRST)

Lak Dasht (Persian: لاک دشت, also Romanized as Lāk Dasht) is a village in Miandorud-e Kuchak Rural District, in the Central District of Sari County, Mazandaran Province, Iran. At the 2016 census, its population was 256, in 87 families. Down from 311 people in 2006.
