= Tir Kola, Sari =

Village in Mazandaran province, Iran

Tir Kola Persian: تيركلا
- Village
- Location within Iran
- Coordinates: 36°33′46″N 52°56′19″E
- Country: Iran
- Province: Mazandaran
- County: Sari
- District: Central
- Rural District: Esfivard-e Shurab

Population (2016)
  - Total: 2,488
- Time zone: UTC+3:30 (IRST)

Tir Kola (Persian: تيركلا) (Note: Also romanized as Tīr Kalā and Tīr Kolā; also known as Tīr Kūlā and Tīr Qal‘eh) is a village in Esfivard-e Shurab Rural District of the Central District in Sari County, Mazandaran province, Iran.

== Demographics ==
=== Population ===
At the time of the 2006 National Census, the village's population was 1,239 in 341 households. The following census in 2011 counted 1,139 people in 337 households. The 2016 census measured the population of the village as 2,488 people in 391 households, the most populous in its rural district.
