= Taleqani Mahalleh =

Village in Mazandaran province, Iran

Taleqani Mahalleh Persian: طالقاني محله
- Village
- Location within Iran
- Coordinates: 36°32′34″N 53°00′30″E
- Country: Iran
- Province: Mazandaran
- County: Sari
- District: Central
- Rural District: Esfivard-e Shurab

Population (2016)
  - Total: 1,208
- Time zone: UTC+3:30 (IRST)

Taleqani Mahalleh (Persian: طالقاني محله) (Note: Also romanized as Ţālqeānī Maḩalleh) is a village in Esfivard-e Shurab Rural District of the Central District in Sari County, Mazandaran province, Iran.

== Demographics ==
=== Population ===
At the time of the 2006 National Census, the village's population was 1,193 in 301 households. The following census in 2011 counted 1,243 people in 378 households. The 2016 census measured the population of the village as 1,208 people in 398 households.
