= Gileh Kola-ye Sofla =

Gileh Kola-ye Sofla گیله کلا سفلی
- Village
- Location within Iran
- Coordinates: 36°32′09″N 52°55′39″E
- Country: Iran
- Province: Mazandaran
- County: Sari
- Bakhsh: Central
- Rural District: Esfivard-e Shurab

Population (2016)
  - Total: 741
- Time zone: UTC+3:30 (IRST)

Gileh Kola-ye Sofla (Persian: گیله کلا سفلی, also Romanized as Gīleh Kolā-ye Soflá; also known as Gīleh Kolā) is a village in Esfivard-e Shurab Rural District, in the Central District of Sari County, Mazandaran Province, Iran. At the 2006 census, its population was 818, in 207 families. In 2016, it had 741 people in 247 households.
