= Velesh Kola =

Velesh Kola, Iran ولشكلا
- Village
- Location within Iran
- Coordinates: 36°39′06″N 53°06′31″E
- Country: Iran
- Province: Mazandaran
- County: Sari
- Bakhsh: Central
- Rural District: Miandorud-e Kuchak

Population (2006)
  - Total: 887
- Time zone: UTC+3:30 (IRST)

Velesh Kola (Persian: ولشكلا, also Romanized as Velesh Kolā) is a village in Miandorud-e Kuchak Rural District, in the Central District of Sari County, Mazandaran Province, Iran. In 2016, its population was 806, in 275 families. Down from 887 in 2006.
