= Qurti Kola =

Qurti Kola قورتيكلا
- Village
- Location within Iran
- Coordinates: 36°34′49″N 53°08′25″E
- Country: Iran
- Province: Mazandaran
- County: Sari
- Bakhsh: Central
- Rural District: Miandorud-e Kuchak

Population (2016)
  - Total: 813
- Time zone: UTC+3:30 (IRST)

Qurti Kola (Persian: قورتيكلا, also Romanized as Qūrtī Kolā; also known as Qūrt Kolā) is a village in Miandorud-e Kuchak Rural District, in the Central District of Sari County, Mazandaran Province, Iran. At the 2016 census, its population was 813, in 274 families. Up from 736 in 2006.
