= Suznak =

Suznak سوزنک
- Village
- Interactive map of Suznak
- Coordinates: 36°39′57″N 53°7′39″E
- Country: Iran
- Province: Mazandaran
- County: Sari
- Bakhsh: Central
- Rural District: Miandorud-e Kuchak

Population (2016)
  - Total: 166
- Time zone: UTC+3:30 (IRST)

Suznak (Persian: سوزنک, also Romanized as Sūznak) is a village in Miandorud-e Kuchak Rural District, in the Central District of Sari County, Mazandaran Province, Iran. At the 2016 census, its population was 166, in 54 families.
