= Farahabad-e Kheyl =

Farahabad-e Kheyl فرح آباد خيل
- Village
- Location within Iran
- Coordinates: 36°36′17″N 53°01′52″E
- Country: Iran
- Province: Mazandaran
- County: Sari
- Bakhsh: Central
- Rural District: Mazkureh

Population (2016)
  - Total: 329
- Time zone: UTC+3:30 (IRST)

Farahabad-e Kheyl (Persian: فرح آبادخيل, also Romanized as Faraḩābād-e Kheyl and Faraḩābād Kheyl; also known as Faraḩābād-e Khalīl) is a village in Mazkureh Rural District, in the Central District of Sari County, Mazandaran Province, Iran. At the 2016 census, its population was 329, in 117 families.
