= Neqarechi Mahalleh =

Neqarechi Mahalleh or Naqqarchi Mahalleh (Persian: نقارچي محله), also rendered as Neqarehchi Mahalleh, may refer to:

- Neqarechi Mahalleh, Babol
- Naqqarchi Mahalleh, Sari
