= Parchi Kola, Sari =

Village in Mazandaran province, Iran

Parchi Kola Persian: پرچيكلا
- Village
- Location within Iran
- Coordinates: 36°29′08″N 53°06′12″E
- Country: Iran
- Province: Mazandaran
- County: Sari
- District: Central
- Rural District: Kolijan Rostaq-e Sofla

Population (2016)
  - Total: 347
- Time zone: UTC+3:30 (IRST)

Parchi Kola (Persian: پرچيكلا) (Note: Also romanized as Parchī Kolā; also known as Parchī Kūlā) is a village in Kolijan Rostaq-e Sofla Rural District of the Central District in Sari County, Mazandaran province, Iran.

== Demographics ==
=== Population ===
At the time of the 2006 National Census, the village's population was 367 in 81 households. The following census in 2011 counted 350 people in 93 households. The 2016 census measured the population of the village as 347 people in 117 households.
