= Aboksar, Mazkureh =

Village in Mazandaran province, Iran

Aboksar Persian: آبكسر
- Village
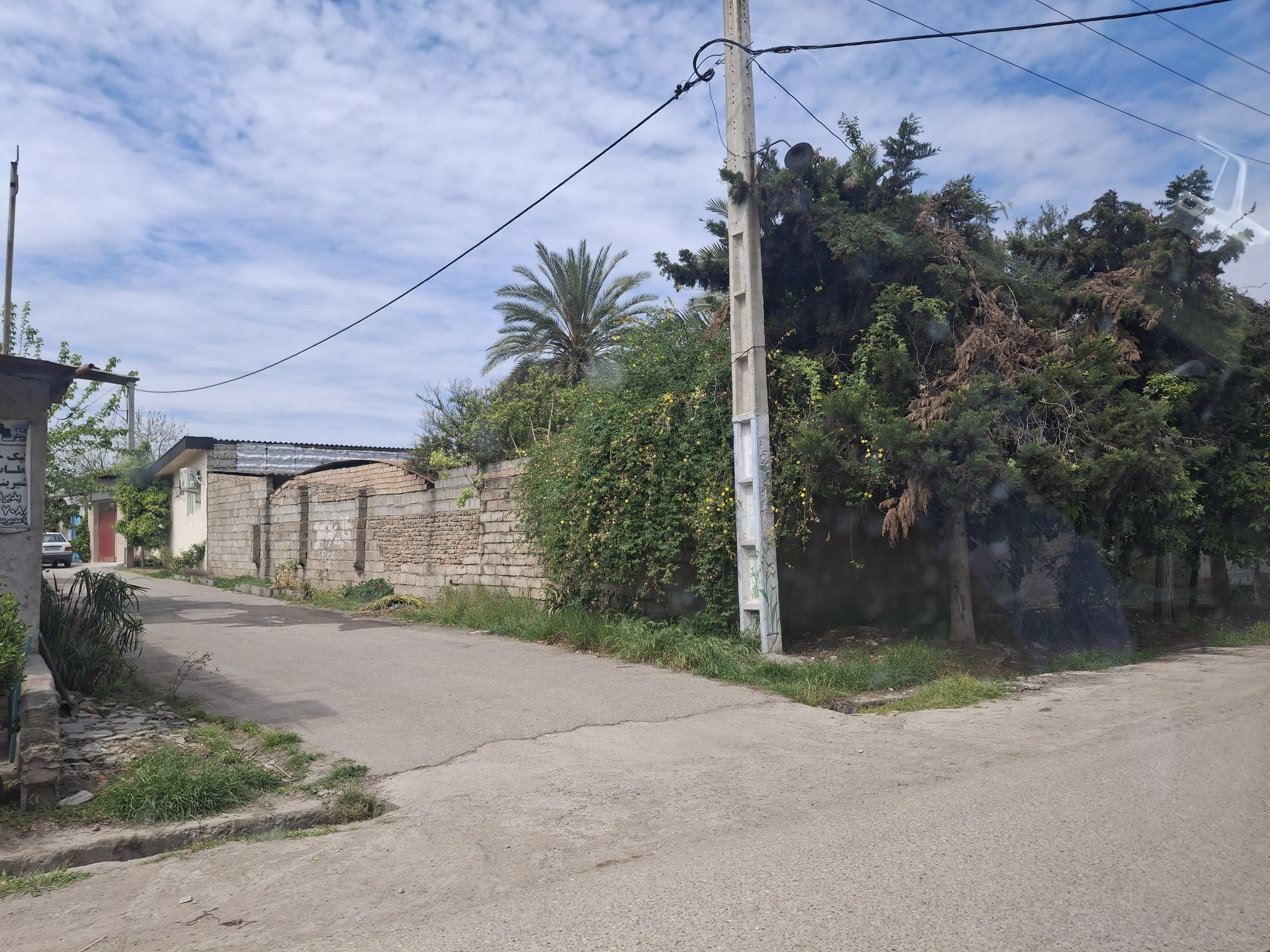
- Aboksar Village

- Location within Iran
- Coordinates: 36°34′19″N 53°00′36″E
- Country: Iran
- Province: Mazandaran
- County: Sari
- District: Central
- Rural District: Mazkureh

Population (2016)
  - Total: 1,418
- Time zone: UTC+3:30 (IRST)

Aboksar (Persian: آبكسر) (Note: Also romanized as Āboksar) is a village in Mazkureh Rural District of the Central District in Sari County, Mazandaran province, Iran.

== Demographics ==
=== Population ===
At the time of the 2006 National Census, the village's population was 1,286 in 348 households. The following census in 2011 counted 1,328 people in 403 households. The 2016 census measured the population of the village as 1,418 people in 448 households.
