= Mahforujak =

Mahforujak ماهفروجک
- Village
- Location within Iran
- Coordinates: 36°30′15″N 52°58′11″E
- Country: Iran
- Province: Mazandaran
- County: Sari
- Bakhsh: Central
- Rural District: Esfivard-e Shurab

Population (2016)
  - Total: 815
- Time zone: UTC+3:30 (IRST)

Mahforujak (Persian: ماهفروجک, also Romanized as Māhforūjak, Māhforujak, and Māhfrūjak) is a village in Esfivard-e Shurab Rural District, in the Central District of Sari County, Mazandaran Province, Iran. At the 2016 census, its population was 815, in 291 families. Down from 892 in 2006.
