= Barik Absar =

Barik Absar باريک آبسر
- Village
- Location within Iran
- Coordinates: 36°30′23″N 52°59′14″E
- Country: Iran
- Province: Mazandaran
- County: Sari
- Bakhsh: Central
- Rural District: Esfivard-e Shurab

Population (2016)
  - Total: 915
- Time zone: UTC+3:30 (IRST)

Barik Absar (Persian: باريک آبسر, also Romanized as Bārīk Ābsar) is a village in Esfivard-e Shurab Rural District, in the Central District of Sari County, Mazandaran Province, Iran. At the 2016 census, its population was 915, in 323 families. Up from 854 people in 2006.
