= Isa Khandaq =

Village in Mazandaran province, Iran

Isa Khandaq Persian: عيسي خندق
- Village
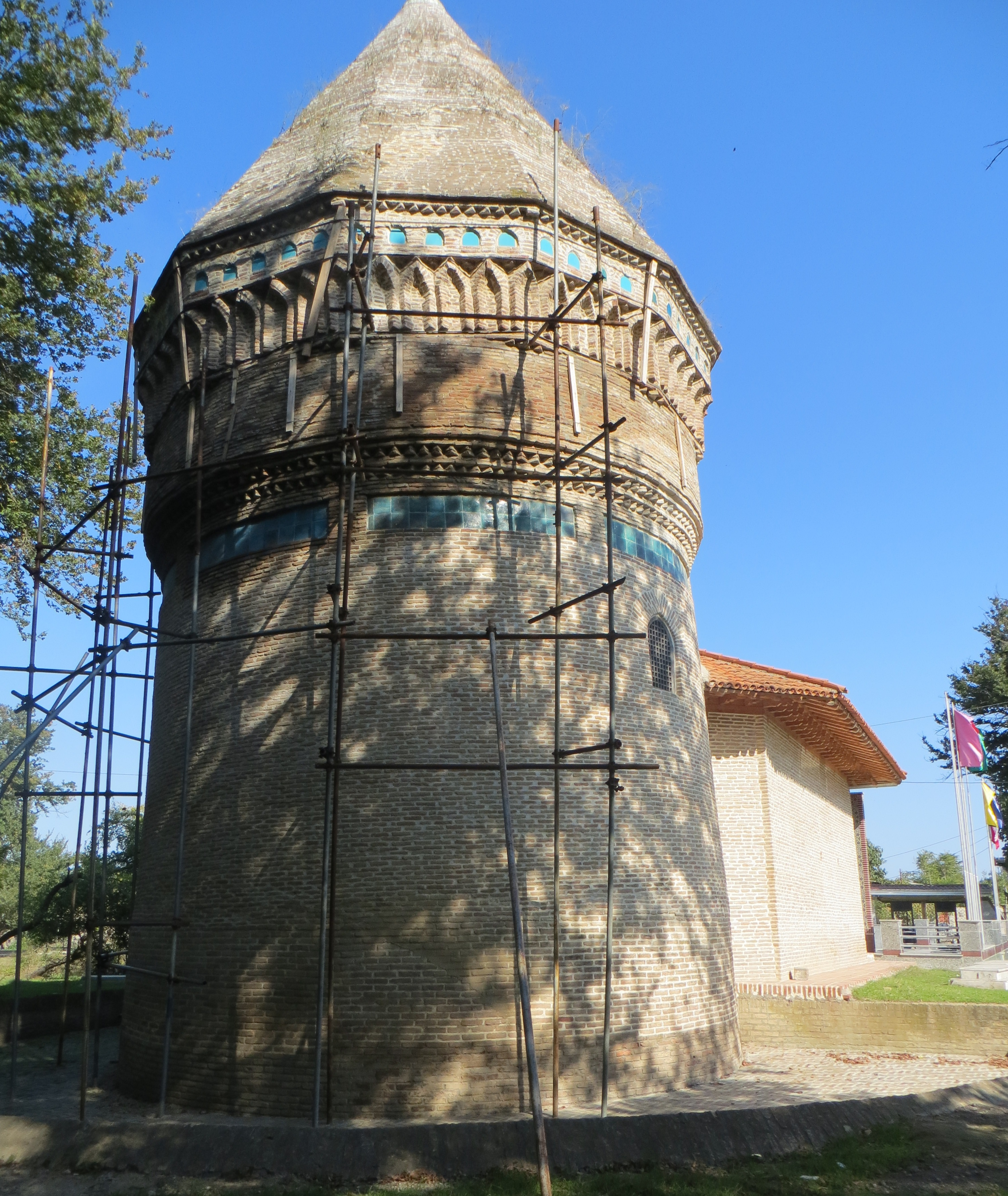
- Emamzadeh Qasem mausoleum

- Location within Iran
- Coordinates: 36°34′24″N 52°59′10″E
- Country: Iran
- Province: Mazandaran
- County: Sari
- District: Central
- Rural District: Mazkureh

Population (2016)
  - Total: 616
- Time zone: UTC+3:30 (IRST)

Isa Khandaq (Persian: عيسي خندق) (Note: Also romanized as ‘Īsá Khandaq) is a village in Mazkureh Rural District of the Central District in Sari County, Mazandaran province, Iran.

== Demographics ==
=== Population ===
At the time of the 2006 National Census, the village's population was 696 in 185 households. The following census in 2011 counted 692 people in 200 households. The 2016 census measured the population of the village as 616 people in 209 households.
