= Tang-e Lateh =

Village in Mazandaran province, Iran

Tang-e Lateh Persian: تنگلته
- Village
- Location within Iran
- Coordinates: 36°29′57″N 53°05′47″E
- Country: Iran
- Province: Mazandaran
- County: Sari
- District: Central
- Rural District: Kolijan Rostaq-e Sofla

Population (2016)
  - Total: 863
- Time zone: UTC+3:30 (IRST)

Tang-e Lateh (Persian: تنگلته) (Note: Also romanized as Tang Lateh; also known as Tang-i-Laleh) is a village in Kolijan Rostaq-e Sofla Rural District of the Central District in Sari County, Mazandaran province, Iran.

== Demographics ==
=== Population ===
At the time of the 2006 National Census, the village's population was 951 in 245 households. The following census in 2011 counted 964 people in 292 households. The 2016 census measured the population of the village as 863 people in 298 households.
