= Gol Chini =

Village in Mazandaran province, Iran

Gol Chini Persian: گل چینی
- Village
- Location within Iran
- Coordinates: 36°32′21″N 53°03′30″E
- Country: Iran
- Province: Mazandaran
- County: Sari
- District: Central
- Rural District: Esfivard-e Shurab

Population (2016)
  - Total: 1,038
- Time zone: UTC+3:30 (IRST)

Gol Chini (Persian: گل چینی) (Note: Also romanized as Gol Chīnī) is a village in Esfivard-e Shurab Rural District of the Central District in Sari County, Mazandaran province, Iran.

== Demographics ==
=== Population ===
At the time of the 2006 National Census, the village's population was 689 in 168 households. The following census in 2011 counted 1,021 people in 286 households. The 2016 census measured the population of the village as 1,038 people in 311 households.
