= Mazkureh Rural District =

Rural district in Mazandaran province, Iran

Mazkureh Rural District Persian: دهستان مذكوره
- Rural District
- Location within Iran
- Coordinates: 36°36′N 53°00′E
- Country: Iran
- Province: Mazandaran
- County: Sari
- District: Central
- Established: 1987
- Capital: Bandar Kheyl

Population (2016)
  - Total: 33,310
- Time zone: UTC+3:30 (IRST)

Mazkureh Rural District (Persian: دهستان مذكوره) is in the Central District of Sari County, Mazandaran province, Iran. Its capital is the village of Bandar Kheyl.

== Demographics ==
=== Population ===
At the time of the 2006 National Census, the rural district's population was 25,883 in 6,904 households. There were 27,302 inhabitants in 8,231 households at the following census of 2011. The 2016 census measured the population of the rural district as 33,310 in 10,825 households. The most populous of its 32 villages was Qoroq, with 10,704 people.

=== Other villages in the rural district ===
- Aboksar
- Aghur Kash
- Akhvor Sar
- Ali Koti
- Chenar Bon
- Daryek
- Dimturan
- Div Koti
- Dowlatabad
- Farahabad-e Kheyl
- Galleh Kola-ye Kar Kandeh
- Hajjiabad
- Isa Khandaq
- Kar Kandeh
- Khar Yek
- Khorramabad
- Khvoshab
- Limun
- Miar Kola
- Mofti Kola
- Moqam
- Ragan Dasht
- Shahab Lilam
- Sharafabad
- Tajanak-e Olya
- Tajanak-e Sofla
- Tur Bedar
- Zargar Bagh
- Zavar Mahalleh
