= Samaskandah =

Village in Mazandaran province, Iran

Semes Kandeh-ye Olya Persian: سمسكنده عليا
- Village
- Location within Iran
- Coordinates: 36°34′21″N 53°08′52″E
- Country: Iran
- Province: Mazandaran
- County: Sari
- District: Central
- Rural District: Miandorud-e Kuchak

Population (2016)
  - Total: 3,443
- Time zone: UTC+3:30 (IRST)

Semes Kandeh-ye Olya (Persian: سمسكنده عليا) (Note: Also romanized as Semes Kandeh-ye ‘Olyā; also known as Semes Kandeh-ye Bālā, Semeskandeh, and Shas Kandeh) is a village in, and the capital of, Miandorud-e Kuchak Rural District in the Central District of Sari County, Mazandaran province, Iran.

== Demographics ==
=== Population ===
At the time of the 2006 National Census, the village's population was 3,237 in 857 households. The following census in 2011 counted 3,398 people in 959 households. The 2016 census measured the population of the village as 3,443 people in 1,059 households.

== Notable people ==
Ramin Rezaeian, football player
