= Pain Moallem Kola =

Pain Moallem Kola پائين معلم كلا
- Village
- Location within Iran
- Coordinates: 36°37′21″N 53°05′55″E
- Country: Iran
- Province: Mazandaran
- County: Sari
- Bakhsh: Central
- Rural District: Miandorud-e Kuchak

Population (2016)
  - Total: 703
- Time zone: UTC+3:30 (IRST)

Pain Moallem Kola (Persian: پائين معلم كلا, also Romanized as Pā’īn Mo‘allem Kolā; also known as Mo‘allem Kolāyeh) is a village in Miandorud-e Kuchak Rural District, in the Central District of Sari County, Mazandaran Province, Iran. At the 2016 census, its population was 703, in 241 families. up from 693 in 2006.

It is located north of Bala Moallem Kola village.
