= Pasha Kola-ye Enteqali =

Village in Mazandaran province, Iran

Pasha Kola-ye Enteqali Persian: پاشاكلاانتقالي
- Village
- Location within Iran
- Coordinates: 36°31′15″N 52°57′20″E
- Country: Iran
- Province: Mazandaran
- County: Sari
- District: Central
- Rural District: Esfivard-e Shurab

Population (2016)
  - Total: 1,043
- Time zone: UTC+3:30 (IRST)

Pasha Kola-ye Enteqali (Persian: پاشاكلاانتقالي) (Note: Also romanized as Pāshā Kolā-ye Enteqālī) is a village in Esfivard-e Shurab Rural District of the Central District in Sari County, Mazandaran province, Iran.

== Demographics ==
=== Population ===
At the time of the 2006 National Census, the village's population was 933 in 238 households. The following census in 2011 counted 1,062 people in 320 households. The 2016 census measured the population of the village as 1,043 people in 336 households.
