= Bala Sang Rizeh =

Bala Sang Rizeh بالاسنگريزه
- Village
- Location within Iran
- Coordinates: 36°32′09″N 53°02′57″E
- Country: Iran
- Province: Mazandaran
- County: Sari
- Bakhsh: Central
- Rural District: Esfivard-e Shurab

Population (2016)
  - Total: 828
- Time zone: UTC+3:30 (IRST)

Bala Sang Rizeh (Persian: بالاسنگريزه, also Romanized as Bālā Sang Rīzeh) is a village in Esfivard-e Shurab Rural District, in the Central District of Sari County, Mazandaran Province, Iran. It is a southwestern suburb of Sari city. At the 2016 census, its population was 828, in 266 families. Up from 746 people in 2006.
