= Marmat =

Village in Mazandaran province, Iran

Marmat Persian: مرمت
- Village
- Location within Iran
- Coordinates: 36°30′44″N 53°07′10″E
- Country: Iran
- Province: Mazandaran
- County: Sari
- District: Central
- Rural District: Miandorud-e Kuchak

Population (2016)
  - Total: 1,954
- Time zone: UTC+3:30 (IRST)

Marmat (Persian: مرمت) is a village in Miandorud-e Kuchak Rural District of the Central District in Sari County, Mazandaran province, Iran.

== Demographics ==
=== Population ===
At the time of the 2006 National Census, the village's population was 1,712 in 404 households. The following census in 2011 counted 1,721 people in 530 households. The 2016 census measured the population of the village as 1,954 people in 632 households.
