= Shahrak-e Janbazan =

Shahrak-e Janbazan شهرک جانبازان
- township
- Interactive map of Shahrak-e Janbazan
- Coordinates: 36°32′4.204″N 53°0′30.542″E
- Country: Iran
- Province: Mazandaran
- County: Sari
- Bakhsh: Central
- Rural District: Esfivard-e Shurab

Population (2006)
  - Total: 558
- Time zone: UTC+3:30 (IRST)

Shahrak-e Janbazan (Persian: شهرک جانبازان, also Romanized as Shahrak-e Jānbāzān) is a township in Esfivard-e Shurab Rural District, in the Central District of Sari County, Mazandaran Province, Iran. At the 2006 census, its population was 558, in 120 families. In 2016, its population was 533 people in 178 households.
