= Sharafdar Kola-ye Olya =

Village in Mazandaran province, Iran

Sharafdar Kola-ye Olya Persian: شرفداركلا عليا
- Village
- Location within Iran
- Coordinates: 36°32′26″N 52°59′43″E
- Country: Iran
- Province: Mazandaran
- County: Sari
- District: Central
- Rural District: Esfivard-e Shurab

Population (2016)
  - Total: 759
- Time zone: UTC+3:30 (IRST)

Sharafdar Kola-ye Olya (Persian: شرفداركلا عليا) (Note: Also romanized as Sharafdār Kolā-ye ‘Olyā; also known as Sharafdār Kolā) is a village in, and the capital of, Esfivard-e Shurab Rural District in the Central District of Sari County, Mazandaran province, Iran.

== Demographics ==
=== Population ===
At the time of the 2006 National Census, the village's population was 910 in 232 households. The following census in 2011 counted 680 people in 218 households. The 2016 census measured the population of the village as 759 people in 223 households.
