= Pain Malik =

Pain Malik پایین ملیک
- Village
- Interactive map of Pain Malik
- Coordinates: 36°33′15.82″N 53°0′59.86″E
- Country: Iran
- Province: Mazandaran
- County: Sari
- Bakhsh: Central
- Rural District: Esfivard-e Shurab

Population (2016)
  - Total: 654
- Time zone: UTC+3:30 (IRST)

Pain Malik (Persian: پایین ملیک, also Romanized as Pā’īn Malīk) is a village in Esfivard-e Shurab Rural District, in the Central District of Sari County, Mazandaran Province, Iran, just northwest of Sari city. At the 2016 census, its population was 654, in 210 families. Down from 825 people in 2006.
