= Ahi Dasht =

Neighborhood in Mazandaran province, Iran

Ahi Dasht Persian: آهی دشت
- Neighborhood
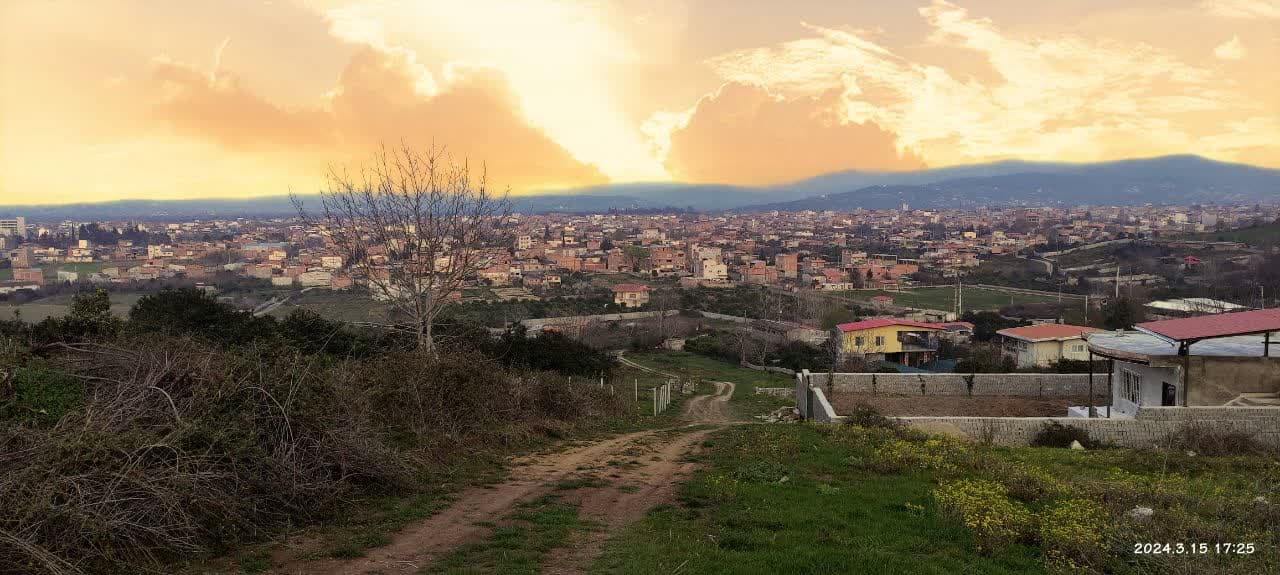
- Ahi Dasht

- Location within Iran
- Coordinates: 36°31′29″N 53°04′07″E
- Country: Iran
- Province: Mazandaran
- County: Sari
- District: Central
- City: Sari

Population (2016)
  - Total: 4,092
- Time zone: UTC+3:30 ({{{timezone}}}IRST)

Ahi Dasht (Persian: آهی دشت) (Note: Also romanized as Āhī Dasht; also known as Āhū Dasht) is a southern suburb of Sari city in Mazandaran province, Iran.

Formerly, it was a village in Kolijan Rostaq-e Sofla Rural District, in the Central District of Sari County.

== Demographics ==
=== Population ===
At the time of the 2006 National Census, the village's population was 2,827 in 696 households. The following census in 2011 counted 3,971 people in 1,136 households. The 2016 census measured the population of the village as 4,092 people in 1,249 households. Ahi Dasht was incorporated into the 3rd District of Sari city's Municipality after the census.
