= Bala Deza =

Neighborhood in Mazandaran province, Iran

Bala Deza Persian: بالادزا
- Neighborhood
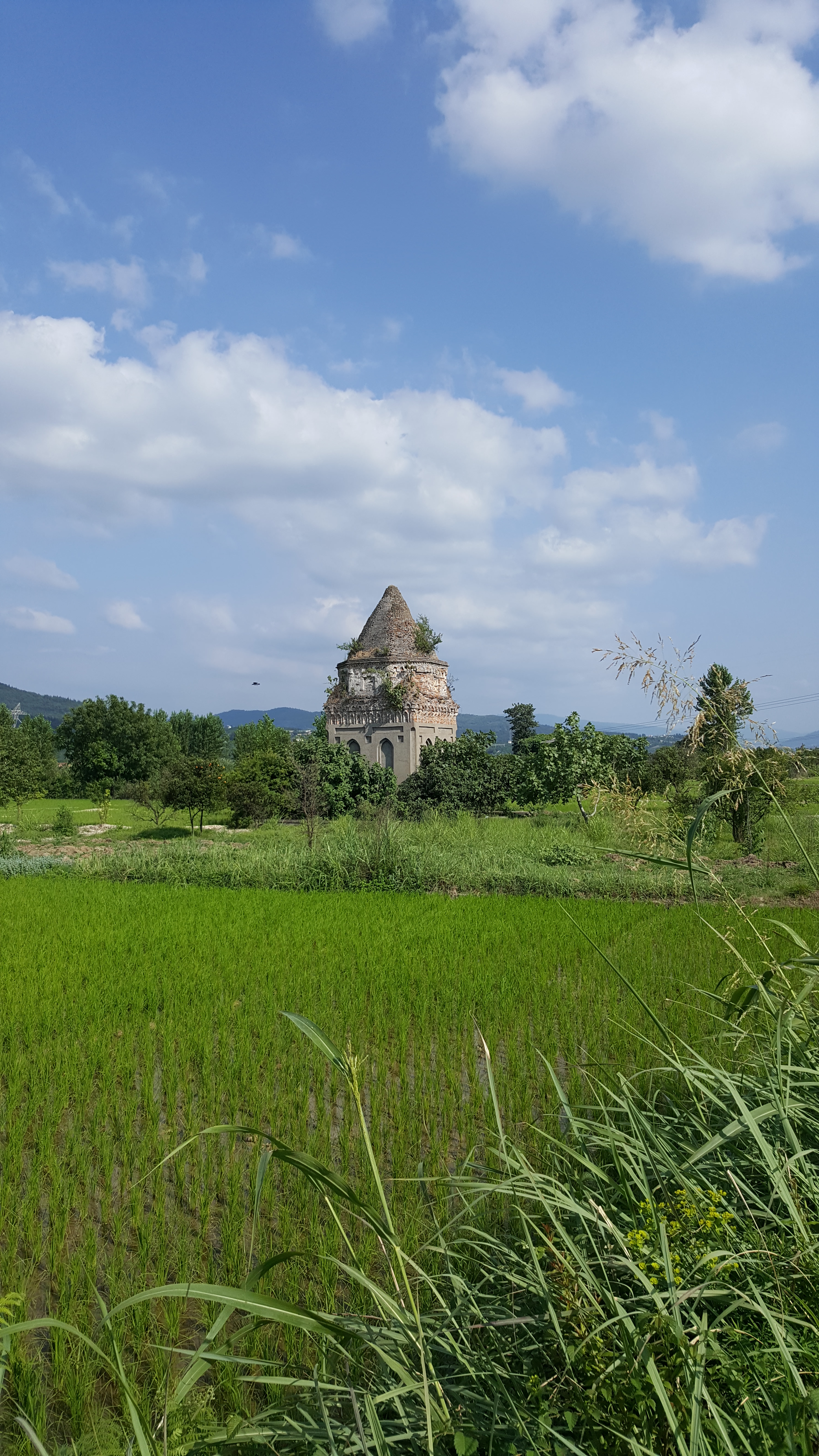
- Bala Deza

- Location within Iran
- Coordinates: 36°30′39″N 53°04′25″E
- Country: Iran
- Province: Mazandaran
- County: Sari
- District: Central
- City: Sari

Population (2016)
  - Total: 3,632
- Time zone: UTC+3:30 (IRST)

Bala Deza (Persian: بالادزا) (Note: Also romanized as Bālā Dezā) is a southern suburb of Sari city in Mazandaran province, Iran. It is the southernmost neighborhood in the urban area.

Formerly, it was a village in Kolijan Rostaq-e Sofla Rural District, in the Central District of Sari County.

== Demographics ==
=== Population ===
At the time of the 2006 National Census, the village's population was 5,998 in 1,560 households. The following census in 2011 counted 7,862 people in 2,297 households. The 2016 census measured the population of the village as 3,632 people in 1,160 households.

Bala Deza was incorporated into the 3rd District of Sari city's Municipality after the census.
