= Naqqarchi Mahalleh, Sari =

Naqqarchi Mahalleh نقارچي محله
- Village
- Location within Iran
- Coordinates: 36°32′33″N 53°06′18″E
- Country: Iran
- Province: Mazandaran
- County: Sari
- Bakhsh: Central
- Rural District: Miandorud-e Kuchak

Population (2016)
  - Total: 230
- Time zone: UTC+3:30 (IRST)

Naqqarchi Mahalleh (Persian: نقارچي محله, also Romanized as Naqqārchī Maḩalleh) is a village in Miandorud-e Kuchak Rural District, in the Central District of Sari County, Mazandaran Province, Iran. At the 2016 census, its population was 230, in 79 families. Up from 206 in 2006.
