= Khar Yek =

Khar Yek خاریک
- village
- Location within Iran
- Coordinates: 36°37′55″N 53°01′32″E
- Country: Iran
- Province: Mazandaran
- County: Sari
- Bakhsh: Central
- Rural District: Mazkureh

Population (2016)
  - Total: 502
- Time zone: UTC+3:30 (IRST)

Khar Yek (Persian: خاریک, also Romanized as Khār Yek and Khārīk) is a village in Mazkureh Rural District, in the Central District of Sari County, Mazandaran Province, Iran. At the 2006 census, its population was 595, in 155 families. In 2016, it had 502 people in 163 households.
