= Pain Sang Rizeh =

Pain Sang Rizeh پايين سنگريزه
- Village
- Location within Iran
- Coordinates: 36°31′58″N 53°02′35″E
- Country: Iran
- Province: Mazandaran
- County: Sari
- Bakhsh: Central
- Rural District: Esfivard-e Shurab

Population (2016)
  - Total: 332
- Time zone: UTC+3:30 (IRST)

Pain Sang Rizeh (Persian: پايين سنگريزه, also Romanized as Pā’īn Sang Rīzeh) is a village in Esfivard-e Shurab Rural District, in the Central District of Sari County, Mazandaran Province, Iran, southwest of Sari city. At the 2016 census, its population was 332, in 112 families. Up from 268 people in 2006.
