= Pain Semes Kandeh =

Pain Semes Kandeh پائين سمسكنده
- Village
- Location within Iran
- Coordinates: 36°36′00″N 53°10′00″E
- Country: Iran
- Province: Mazandaran
- County: Sari
- Bakhsh: Central
- Rural District: Miandorud-e Kuchak

Population (2016)
  - Total: 197
- Time zone: UTC+3:30 (IRST)

Pain Semes Kandeh (Persian: پائين سمسكنده, also Romanized as Pā’īn Semes Kandeh; also known as SemesKandeh-ye Sofla(Persian: سمسکنده سفلی), Samaskandeh, Sam Kandeh, Semes Kandeh, and Semes Kandeh-ye Pā’īn) is a village in Miandorud-e Kuchak Rural District, in the Central District of Sari County, Mazandaran Province, Iran. At the 2016 census, its population was 197, in 73 families. Up from 154 in 2006.
