= Tajanak-e Sofla =

Tajanak-e Sofla تجنک سفلی
- Village
- Location within Iran
- Coordinates: 36°37′00″N 53°02′00″E
- Country: Iran
- Province: Mazandaran
- County: Sari
- Bakhsh: Central
- Rural District: Mazkureh

Population (2016)
  - Total: 182
- Time zone: UTC+3:30 (IRST)

Tajanak-e Sofla (Persian: تجنک سفلی, also Romanized as Tajanak-e Soflá) is a village in Mazkureh Rural District, in the Central District of Sari County, Mazandaran Province, Iran. At the 2016 census, its population was 182, in 58 families.
