= Kolijan Rostaq-e Sofla Rural District =

Rural district in Mazandaran province, Iran

Kolijan Rostaq-e Sofla Rural District Persian: دهستان كليجان رستاق سفلي
- Rural District
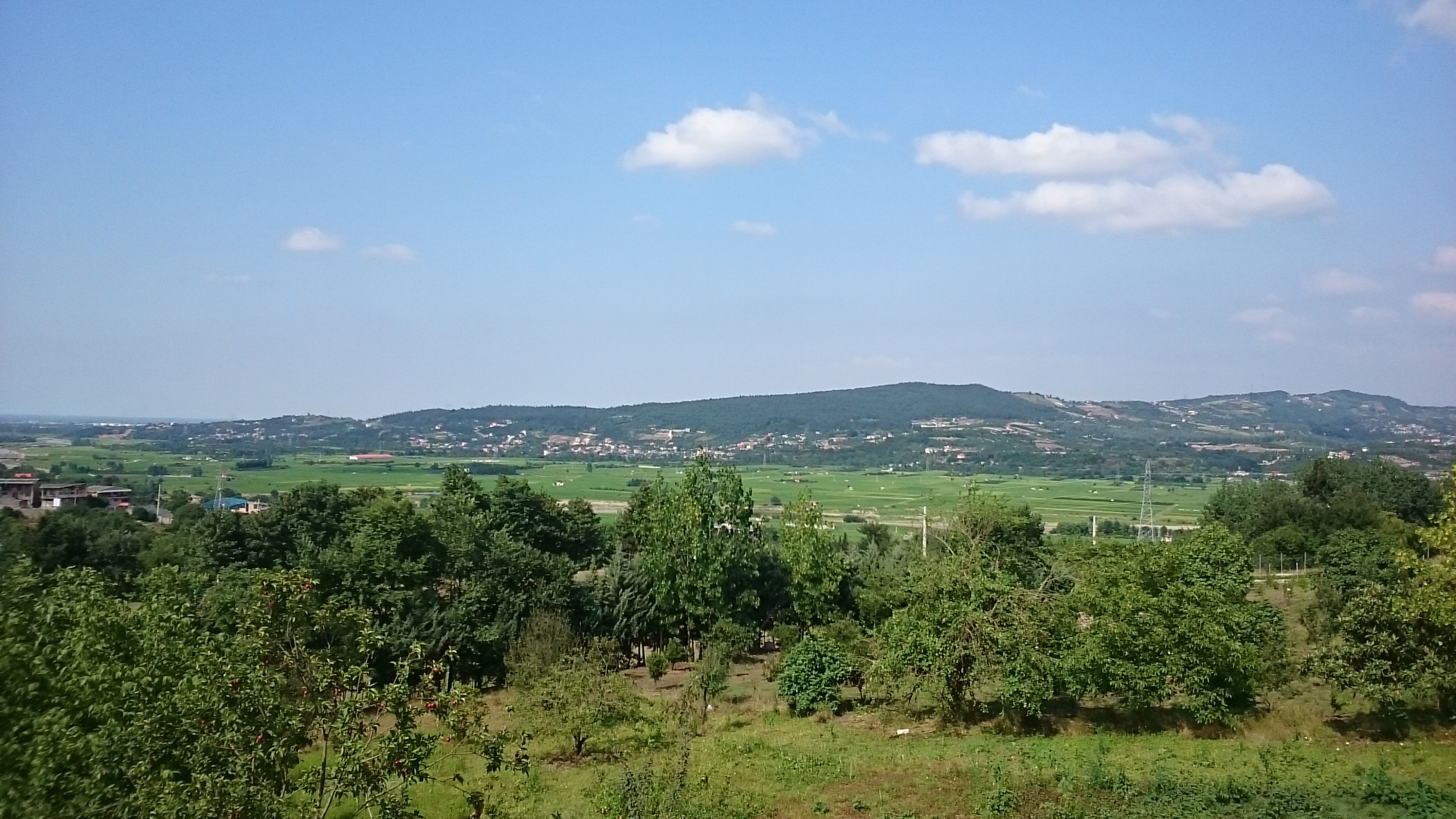
- Valley of Tajan River and its surroundings

- Location within Iran
- Coordinates: 36°30′45″N 53°06′00″E
- Country: Iran
- Province: Mazandaran
- County: Sari
- District: Central
- Capital: Sang Tarashan

Population (2016)
  - Total: 21,813
- Time zone: UTC+3:30 (IRST)

Kolijan Rostaq-e Sofla Rural District (Persian: دهستان كليجان رستاق سفلي) is in the Central District of Sari County, Mazandaran province, Iran. Its capital is the village of Sang Tarashan.

== Demographics ==
=== Population ===
At the time of the 2006 National Census, the rural district's population was 16,953 in 4,301 households. There were 21,579 inhabitants in 6,306 households at the following census of 2011. The 2016 census measured the population of the rural district as 21,813 in 6,777 households. The most populous of its 13 villages was Mahdasht, with 4,220 people.

=== Other villages in the rural district ===
- Ahi Dasht
- Bala Deza
- Khan Abbasi
- Pain Deza
- Pain Kula
- Parchi Kola
- Pol-e Gardan
- San Kheyl
- Tang-e Lateh
- Term
- Vared Mahalleh
