= Pasha Kola-ye Arbabi =

Pasha Kola-ye Arbabi پاشاكلا اربابی
- Village
- Location within Iran
- Coordinates: 36°32′29″N 52°56′58″E
- Country: Iran
- Province: Mazandaran
- County: Sari
- Bakhsh: Central
- Rural District: Esfivard-e Shurab

Population (2016)
  - Total: 618
- Time zone: UTC+3:30 (IRST)

Pasha Kola-ye Arbabi (Persian: پاشاكلا اربابی, also Romanized as Pāshā Kolā-ye Arbābī; also known as Pāshā Kolā-ye Bābī) is a village in Esfivard-e Shurab Rural District, in the Central District of Sari County, Mazandaran Province, Iran. At the 2006 census, its population was 749, in 198 families. In 2016, it had 618 people in 219 households.
