= Kar Kandeh, Mazandaran =

Kar Kandeh كاركنده
- Village
- Location within Iran
- Coordinates: 36°36′27″N 52°58′58″E
- Country: Iran
- Province: Mazandaran
- County: Sari
- Bakhsh: Central
- Rural District: Mazkureh

Population (2016)
  - Total: 269
- Time zone: UTC+3:30 (IRST)

Kar Kandeh (Persian: كاركنده, also Romanized as Kār Kandeh) is a village in Mazkureh Rural District, in the Central District of Sari County, Mazandaran Province, Iran. At the 2006 census, its population was 313, in 76 families. In 2016, it had 269 people in 96 households.
