= Pain Deza =

Neighborhood in Mazandaran province, Iran

Pain Deza Persian: پايين دزا
- Neighborhood
- Location within Iran
- Coordinates: 36°31′43″N 53°04′51″E
- Country: Iran
- Province: Mazandaran
- County: Sari
- District: Central
- City: Sari

Population (2016)
  - Total: 1,945
- Time zone: UTC+3:30 (IRST)

Pain Deza (Persian: پايين دزا) (Note: Also romanized as Pā’īn Dezā) is a southern suburb of Sari city in Mazandaran province, Iran.

Formerly, it was a village in Kolijan Rostaq-e Sofla Rural District, in the Central District of Sari County.

== Demographics ==
=== Population ===
At the time of the 2006 National Census, the village's population was 1,705 in 415 households. The following census in 2011 counted 2,019 people in 582 households. The 2016 census measured the population of the village as 1,945 people in 601 households.

Pain Deza was incorporated into the 3rd District of Sari city's Municipality after the census.
