= Mashhadi Kola, Sari =

Mashhadi Kola مشهدی كلا
- Village
- Location within Iran
- Coordinates: 36°33′22″N 53°00′04″E
- Country: Iran
- Province: Mazandaran
- County: Sari
- Bakhsh: Central
- Rural District: Esfivard-e Shurab

Population (2016)
  - Total: 356
- Time zone: UTC+3:30 (IRST)

Mashhadi Kola (Persian: مشهدی كلا, also Romanized as Mashhadī Kolā) is a village in Esfivard-e Shurab Rural District, in the Central District of Sari County, Mazandaran Province, Iran. At the 2006 census, its population was 384, in 91 families. In 2016, it had 356 people in 120 households.
