= Esfivard-e Shurab Rural District =

Rural district in Mazandaran province, Iran

Esfivard-e Shurab Rural District Persian: دهستان اسفيورد شوراب
- Rural District
- Location within Iran
- Coordinates: 36°31′N 53°00′E
- Country: Iran
- Province: Mazandaran
- County: Sari
- District: Central
- Established: 1987
- Capital: Sharafdar Kola-ye Olya

Population (2016)
  - Total: 27,291
- Time zone: UTC+3:30 (IRST)

Esfivard-e Shurab Rural District (Persian: دهستان اسفيورد شوراب) is in the Central District of Sari County, Mazandaran province, Iran. Its capital is the village of Sharafdar Kola-ye Olya. (Note: Also known as Sharafdar Kola)

== Demographics ==
=== Population ===
At the time of the 2006 National Census, the rural district's population was 25,400 in 6,603 households. There were 26,172 inhabitants in 7,966 households at the following census of 2011. The 2016 census measured the population of the rural district as 27,291 in 8,638 households. The most populous of its 34 villages was Tir Kola, with 2,488 people.

=== Other villages in the rural district ===
- Bala Sang Rizeh
- Barik Absar
- Gileh Kola-ye Olya
- Gileh Kola-ye Sofla
- Gol Chini
- Gorji Kola
- Hajji Kola
- Khonarabad
- Kord Kheyl
- Machak Posht
- Mahforujak
- Maleyek
- Mashhadi Kola
- Mian Rud
- Pain Malik
- Pain Sang Rizeh
- Pasha Kola-ye Arbabi
- Pasha Kola-ye Enteqali
- Rud Posht
- Salu Kola
- Sharafdar Kola-ye Olya
- Sharafdar Kola-ye Sofla
- Sheykh Kola
- Sorkh Kola
- Taleqani Mahalleh
- Talu Bagh
- Tir Kola
- Yur Mahalleh
- Zarvijan

Townships:

- Kuy Sahab ol Zeman
- Mojtame-ye Meskuni Aram
- Shahrak-e Farhangian
- Shahrak-e Janbazan
