= Tajanak-e Olya =

Tajanak-e Olya تجنک علیا
- Village
- Location within Iran
- Coordinates: 36°37′00″N 53°02′00″E
- Country: Iran
- Province: Mazandaran
- County: Sari
- Bakhsh: Central
- Rural District: Mazkureh

Population (2016)
  - Total: 218
- Time zone: UTC+3:30 (IRST)

Tajanak-e Olya (Persian: تجنک علیا, also Romanized as Tajanak-e ‘Olyā) is a village in Mazkureh Rural District, in the Central District of Sari County, Mazandaran Province, Iran. At the 2016 census, its population was 218, in 78 families. Up from 210 in 2006.
