= Sharafdar Kola-ye Sofla =

Sharafdar Kola-ye Sofla شرفداركلا سفلی
- Village
- Location within Iran
- Coordinates: 36°32′07″N 52°59′16″E
- Country: Iran
- Province: Mazandaran
- County: Sari
- Bakhsh: Central
- Rural District: Esfivard-e Shurab

Population (2016)
  - Total: 935
- Time zone: UTC+3:30 (IRST)

Sharafdar Kola-ye Sofla (Persian: شرفداركلا سفلی, also Romanized as Sharafdār Kolā-ye Soflá) is a village in Esfivard-e Shurab Rural District, in the Central District of Sari County, Mazandaran Province, Iran. At the 2016 census, its population was 935, in 305 families. Up from 844 people in 2006.
