= Miandorud-e Kuchak Rural District =

Rural district in Mazandaran province, Iran

Miandorud-e Kuchak Rural District Persian: دهستان مياندورود كوچك
- Rural District
- Location within Iran
- Coordinates: 36°35′N 53°08′E
- Country: Iran
- Province: Mazandaran
- County: Sari
- District: Central
- Established: 1987
- Capital: Semes Kandeh-ye Olya

Population (2016)
  - Total: 37,386
- Time zone: UTC+3:30 (IRST)

Miandorud-e Kuchak Rural District (Persian: دهستان مياندورود كوچك) is in the Central District of Sari County, Mazandaran province, Iran. Its capital is the village of Semes Kandeh-ye Olya.

== Demographics ==
=== Population ===
At the time of the 2006 National Census, the rural district's population was 33,905 in 8,876 households. There were 34,380 inhabitants in 10,303 households at the following census of 2011. The 2016 census measured the population of the rural district as 37,386 in 12,320 households. The most populous of its 42 villages was Zoghal Chal, with 3,964 people.

=== Other villages in the rural district ===
- Ab Bandan Kash
- Ab Bandan Sar
- Ardeshir Mahalleh
- Asiab Sar
- Bala Abdang
- Bala Golema
- Bala Moallem Kola
- Bandafruz
- Barar Deh
- Dangsarak
- Esbu Kola
- Espurez
- Goleh Dun
- Gug Bagh
- Hemmatabad
- Hevela
- Hoseynabad
- Jandin
- Kalak
- Khar Kesh
- Lak Dasht
- Malekabad-e Bala
- Malekabad-e Pain
- Marmat
- Naqqarchi Mahalleh
- Now Deh
- Pain Golema
- Pain Moallem Kola
- Pain Semes Kandeh
- Qadi Kola
- Qurti Kola
- Sahebi
- Suznak
- Taher Deh
- Tazehabad-e Jehad
- Valashid
- Velesh Kola
- Zarrinabad-e Olya
- Zarrinabad-e Sofla
