= Bala Moallem Kola =

Bala Moallem Kola بالا معلم كلا
- Village
- Location within Iran
- Coordinates: 36°36′32″N 53°05′40″E
- Country: Iran
- Province: Mazandaran
- County: Sari
- Bakhsh: Central
- Rural District: Miandorud-e Kuchak

Population (2016)
  - Total: 637
- Time zone: UTC+3:30 (IRST)

Bala Moallem Kola (Persian: بالا معلم كلا, also Romanized as Bālā Mo‘allem Kolā) is a village in Miandorud-e Kuchak Rural District, in the Central District of Sari County, Mazandaran Province, Iran. At the 2016 census, its population was 637, in 209 families. Up from 569 people in 2006.

It is located south of Pain Moallem Kola village.
