= Ab Bandan Sar =

Village in Mazandaran province, Iran

Ab Bandan Sar Persian: اببندانسر
- Village
- Location within Iran
- Coordinates: 36°33′11″N 53°06′33″E
- Country: Iran
- Province: Mazandaran
- County: Sari
- District: Central
- Rural District: Miandorud-e Kuchak

Population (2016)
  - Total: 2,040
- Time zone: UTC+3:30 (IRST)

Ab Bandan Sar (Persian: اببندانسر) (Note: Also romanized as Āb Bandān Sar; also known as Abdendun Sar (Mazandarani: آبندون سر), also romanized as Ābēndun Sar) is a village in Miandorud-e Kuchak Rural District of the Central District in Sari County, Mazandaran province, Iran.

== Demographics ==
=== Population ===
At the time of the 2006 National Census, the village's population was 1,706 in 432 households. The following census in 2011 counted 1,951 people in 590 households. The 2016 census measured the population of the village as 2,040 people in 666 households.
