= Zarrinabad-e Olya =

Village in Mazandaran province, Iran

Zarrinabad-e Olya Persian: زرين ابادعليا
- Village
- Location within Iran
- Coordinates: 36°31′08″N 53°12′06″E
- Country: Iran
- Province: Mazandaran
- County: Sari
- District: Central
- Rural District: Miandorud-e Kuchak

Population (2016)
  - Total: 1,165
- Time zone: UTC+3:30 (IRST)

Zarrinabad-e Olya (Persian: زرين آباد عليا) (Note: Also romanized as Zarrīnābād-e ‘Olyā; also known as Bālā Zarrīnābād and Zarrīnābād-e Bālā) is a village in Miandorud-e Kuchak Rural District of the Central District in Sari County, Mazandaran province, Iran.

== Demographics ==
=== Population ===
At the time of the 2006 National Census, the village's population was 1,140 in 272 households. The following census in 2011 counted 1,145 people in 343 households. The 2016 census measured the population of the village as 1,165 people in 384 households.
