= Pasha Kola-ye Bish Mahalleh =

Pasha Kola پاشاكلا
- Village
- Location within Iran
- Coordinates: 36°33′02″N 52°21′14″E
- Country: Iran
- Province: Mazandaran
- County: Amol
- Bakhsh: Central
- Rural District: Harazpey-ye Jonubi

Population (2006)
  - Total: 291
- Time zone: UTC+3:30 (IRST)
  - Summer (DST): UTC+4:30 (IRDT)

Pasha Kola-ye Bish Mahalleh (Persian: پاشاكلابيش محله, also Romanized as Pāshā Kolā-ye Bīsh Maḩalleh; also known as Pāshā Kolā) is a village in Harazpey-ye Jonubi Rural District, in the Central District of Amol County, Mazandaran province, Iran. At the 2006 census, its population was 291, in 71 families.
