= Tajanak, Babol =

Tajanak تجنك
- Village
- Location within Iran
- Coordinates: 36°31′23″N 52°33′54″E
- Country: Iran
- Province: Mazandaran
- County: Babol
- Bakhsh: Lalehabad
- Rural District: Karipey

Population (2006)
  - Total: 1,030
- Time zone: UTC+3:30 (IRST)
  - Summer (DST): UTC+4:30 (IRDT)

Tajanak (Persian: تجنك) is a village in Karipey Rural District, Lalehabad District, Babol County, Mazandaran Province, Iran. At the 2006 census, its population was 1,030, in 265 families.
