= Zarrinabad, Bijar =

Zarrinabad زرين آباد
- Village
- Location within Iran
- Coordinates: 35°35′43″N 47°34′43″E
- Country: Iran
- Province: Kurdistan
- County: Bijar
- Bakhsh: Chang Almas
- Rural District: Khosrowabad

Population (2006)
  - Total: 174
- Time zone: UTC+3:30 (IRST)
  - Summer (DST): UTC+4:30 (IRDT)

Zarrinabad (Persian: زرين آباد, also Romanized as Zarrīnābād) is a village in Khosrowabad Rural District, Chang Almas District, Bijar County, Kurdistan Province, Iran. At the 2006 census, its population was 174, in 35 families. The village is populated by Kurds.
