= Zarrinabad, Qorveh =

Zarrinabad زرين آباد
- Village
- Location within Iran
- Coordinates: 35°18′59″N 47°51′04″E
- Country: Iran
- Province: Kurdistan
- County: Qorveh
- Bakhsh: Serishabad
- Rural District: Qaslan

Population (2006)
  - Total: 97
- Time zone: UTC+3:30 (IRST)
  - Summer (DST): UTC+4:30 (IRDT)

Zarrinabad (Persian: زرين آباد, also Romanized as Zarrīnābād; also known as Zarīnehābād) is a village in Qaslan Rural District, Serishabad District, Qorveh County, Kurdistan Province, Iran. At the 2006 census, its population was 97, in 28 families. The village is populated by Kurds with an Azerbaijani minority.
