= Zarrinabad-e Darreh Shuri =

Zarrinabad-e Darreh Shuri زرين اباددره شوري
- Village
- Location within Iran
- Coordinates: 29°44′16″N 51°35′19″E
- Country: Iran
- Province: Fars
- County: Kazerun
- Bakhsh: Central
- Rural District: Deris

Population (2006)
  - Total: 958
- Time zone: UTC+3:30 (IRST)
  - Summer (DST): UTC+4:30 (IRDT)

Zarrinabad-e Darreh Shuri (Persian: زرين اباددره شوري, also Romanized as Zarrīnābād-e Darreh Shūrī; also known as Zarrīnābād) is a village in Deris Rural District, in the Central District of Kazerun County, Fars province, Iran. At the 2006 census, its population was 958, in 226 families.
