= Zarrinabad, Buin Zahra =

Zarrinabad زرين اباد
- Village
- Location within Iran
- Coordinates: 36°02′03″N 49°57′58″E
- Country: Iran
- Province: Qazvin
- County: Buin Zahra
- Bakhsh: Dashtabi
- Rural District: Dashtabi-ye Sharqi

Population (2006)
  - Total: 57
- Time zone: UTC+3:30 (IRST)
  - Summer (DST): UTC+4:30 (IRDT)

Zarrinabad (Persian: زرين اباد, also Romanized as Zarrīnābād) is a village in Dashtabi-ye Sharqi Rural District, Dashtabi District, Buin Zahra County, Qazvin Province, Iran. At the 2006 census, its population was 57, in 16 families.
