= Sang Rizeh, Mazandaran =

Sang Rizeh سنگ ريزه
- Village
- Country: Iran
- Province: Mazandaran
- County: Babol
- Bakhsh: Bandpey-ye Sharqi
- Rural District: Sajjadrud

Population (2006)
  - Total: 147
- Time zone: UTC+3:30 (IRST)
  - Summer (DST): UTC+4:30 (IRDT)

Sang Rizeh (Persian: سنگ ريزه, also Romanized as Sang Rīzeh) is a village in Sajjadrud Rural District, Bandpey-ye Sharqi District, Babol County, Mazandaran Province, Iran. At the 2006 census, its population was 147, in 35 families.
