= Mashhadi Kola, Babol =

Mashhadi Kola مشهدی كلا
- Village
- Location within Iran
- Coordinates: 36°35′37″N 52°38′58″E
- Country: Iran
- Province: Mazandaran
- County: Babol
- Bakhsh: Central
- Rural District: Feyziyeh

Population (2016)
  - Total: 486
- Time zone: UTC+3:30 (IRST)

Mashhadi Kola (Persian: مشهدی كلا, also Romanized as Mashhadī Kolā) is a village in Feyziyeh Rural District, in the Central District of Babol County, Mazandaran Province, Iran.

At the time of the 2006 National Census, the village's population was 501 in 122 households. The following census in 2011 counted 485 people in 134 households. The 2016 census measured the population of the village as 486 people in 153 households.
