= Zarrinabad, Kerman =

Zarrinabad زرين اباد
- Village
- Location within Iran
- Coordinates: 28°54′23″N 58°36′39″E
- Country: Iran
- Province: Kerman
- County: Narmashir
- Bakhsh: Rud Ab
- Rural District: Rud Ab-e Sharqi

Population (2006)
  - Total: 933
- Time zone: UTC+3:30 (IRST)
  - Summer (DST): UTC+4:30 (IRDT)

Zarrinabad (Persian: زرين اباد, also Romanized as Zarrīnābād; also known as Zarrīn Āb) is a village in Rud Ab-e Sharqi Rural District, Rud Ab District, Narmashir County, Kerman Province, Iran. At the 2006 census, its population was 933, in 223 families.
