= Pasha Kola, Shirgah =

Pasha Kola پاشاكلا
- village
- Location within Iran
- Coordinates: 36°14′06″N 52°47′50″E
- Country: Iran
- Province: Mazandaran
- County: North Savadkuh
- Rural District: Lafur

Population (2016)
  - Total: 93
- Time zone: UTC+3:30 (IRST)

Pasha Kola (Persian: پاشاكلا, also Romanized as Pāshā Kolā) is a village in Lafur Rural District, North Savadkuh County, Mazandaran Province, Iran. At the 2016 census, its population was 93, in 45 families. Decreased from 187 people in 2006.
