= Pasha Kola, Qaem Shahr =

Pasha Kola پاشاكلا
- Village
- Location within Iran
- Coordinates: 36°24′11″N 52°46′01″E
- Country: Iran
- Province: Mazandaran
- County: Qaem Shahr
- Bakhsh: Central
- Rural District: Balatajan

Population (2006)
  - Total: 320
- Time zone: UTC+3:30 (IRST)
  - Summer (DST): UTC+4:30 (IRDT)

Pasha Kola (Persian: پاشاكلا, also Romanized as Pāshā Kolā) is a village in Balatajan Rural District, in the Central District of Qaem Shahr County, Mazandaran Province, Iran. At the 2006 census, its population was 320, in 81 families.
