= Pain Golema =

Village in Mazandaran province, Iran

Pain Golema Persian: پائين گلما
- Village
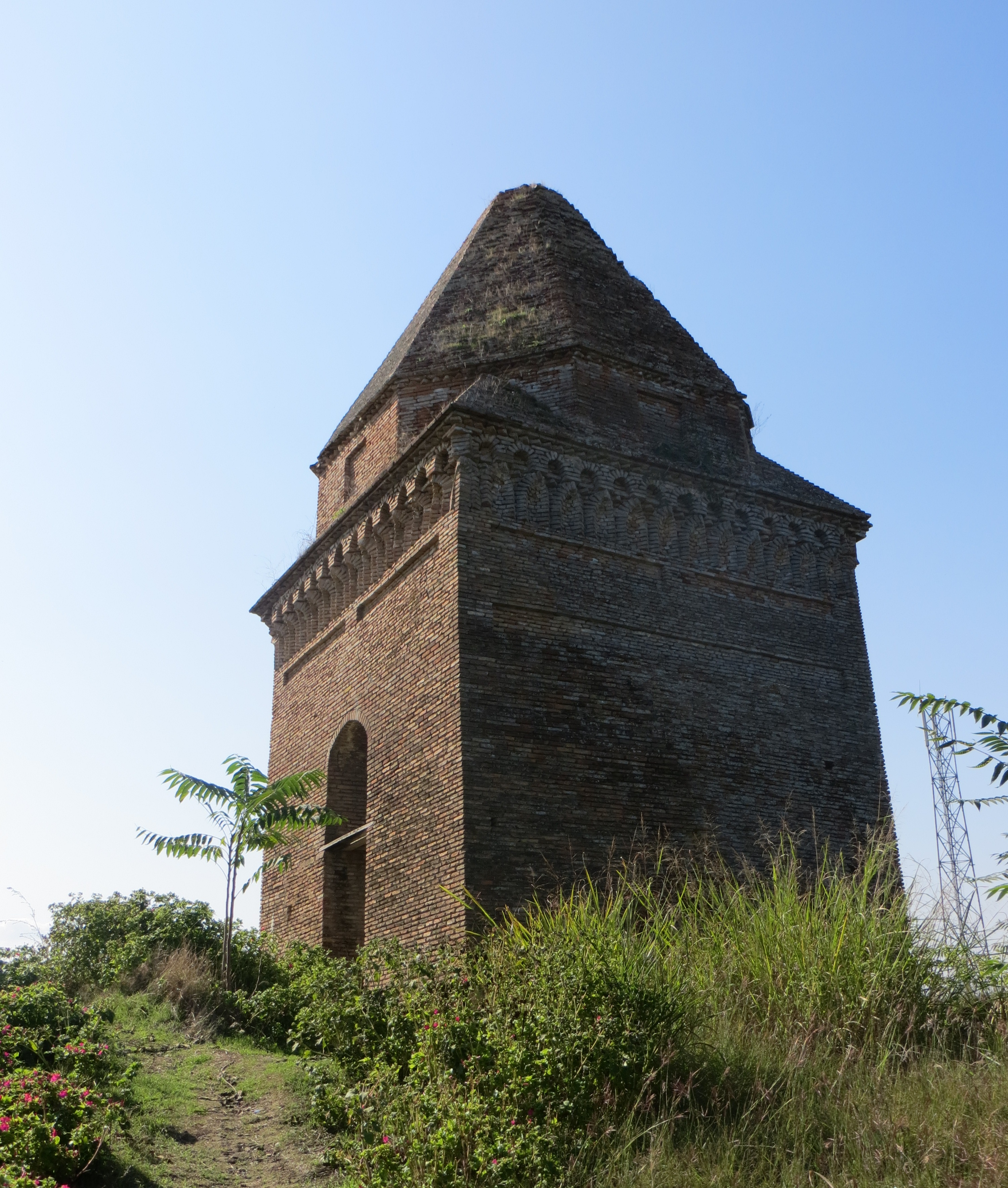
- Golema Tower

- Location within Iran
- Coordinates: 36°36′30″N 53°06′30″E
- Country: Iran
- Province: Mazandaran
- County: Sari
- District: Central
- Rural District: Miandorud-e Kuchak

Population (2016)
  - Total: 1,493
- Time zone: UTC+3:30 (IRST)

Pain Golema (Persian: پائين گلما) (Note: Also romanized as Pā’īn Golmā; also known as Golmā Pā’īn and Golmā-ye Pā’īn) is a village in Miandorud-e Kuchak Rural District of the Central District in Sari County, Mazandaran province, Iran.

== Demographics ==
=== Population ===
At the time of the 2006 National Census, the village's population was 1,158 in 302 households. The following census in 2011 counted 1,421 people in 432 households. The 2016 census measured the population of the village as 1,493 people in 490 households.
