= Central District (Sari County) =

District in Mazandaran province, Iran

Central District (Sari County) Persian: بخش مرکزی شهرستان ساری
- District
- Location within Iran
- Coordinates: 36°35′N 53°06′E
- Country: Iran
- Province: Mazandaran
- County: Sari
- Capital: Sari

Population (2016)
  - Total: 429,620
- Time zone: UTC+3:30 (IRST)

The Central District of Sari County (Persian: بخش مرکزی شهرستان ساری) is in Mazandaran province, Iran. Its capital is the city of Sari.

== History ==
In 2010, Rudpey-ye Jonubi and Rudpey-ye Shomali Rural Districts were separated from the district in the formation of Rudpey District.

== Demographics ==
=== Population ===
At the time of the 2006 National Census, the district's population was 395,716 in 107,378 households. The following census in 2011 counted 408,850 people in 123,604 households. The 2016 census measured the population of the Central District as 429,620 inhabitants in 140,492 households.

=== Administrative divisions ===
Central District (Sari County) Population
Administrative Divisions	2006	2011	2016
Esfivard-e Shurab RD	25,400	26,172	27,291
Kolijan Rostaq-e Sofla RD	16,953	21,579	21,813
Mazkureh RD	25,883	27,302	33,310
Miandorud-e Kuchak RD	33,905	34,380	37,386
Rudpey-ye Jonubi RD (Note: Formerly Rudpey Rural District) (Note: Transferred to Rudpey District and renamed Rudpey-ye Sharqi Rural District)	20,548		
Rudpey-ye Shomali RD (Note: Transferred to Rudpey District)	13,943		
Sari (city)	259,084	296,417	309,820
Total	395,716	405,850	429,620
RD = Rural District
