= Talar Posht-e Sofla =

Village in Mazandaran province, Iran

Talar Posht-e Sofla Persian: تالارپشت سفلی
- Village
- Location within Iran
- Coordinates: 36°25′03″N 52°50′23″E
- Country: Iran
- Province: Mazandaran
- County: Qaem Shahr
- District: Central
- Rural District: Aliabad
- Elevation: 96 m (315 ft)

Population (2016)
  - Total: 1,383
- Time zone: UTC+3:30 (IRST)

Talar Posht-e Sofla (Persian: تالارپشت سفلی) (Note: Also romanized as Tālār Posht-e Soflá; also known as Pā’īn Tālār Posht) is a village in Aliabad Rural District of the Central District in Qaem Shahr County, Mazandaran province, Iran.

== Geograpghy ==
The village borders Road 79 to its east, and Talar River to its west. Its nearby villages are Talar Posht-e Olya in south, Matan Kola in east (east side of the road), and Kashka to its west (west side of the river).

== Demographics ==
=== Population ===
At the time of the 2006 National Census, the village's population was 1,394 in 351 households. The following census in 2011 counted 1,431 people in 418 households. The 2016 census measured the population of the village as 1,383 people in 432 households.
