= Hajji Kola =

Hajji Kola or Haji Kola or Hajji Kala or Haji Kala (Persian: حاجيكلا) may refer to:

- Hajji Kola, Gatab, Babol County
- Hajji Kola, Lalehabad, Babol County
- Hajji Kola, Juybar
- Hajji Kola, Nur
- Hajji Kola, Qaem Shahr
- Hajji Kola-ye Arazlu, Qaem Shahr County
- Hajji Kola-ye Sanam, Qaem Shahr County
- Hajji Kola, Sari
- Hajji Kola, Chahardangeh, Sari County
- Hajji Kola, Lafur, Savadkuh County
- Hajji Kola, Shirgah, Savadkuh County
