= Afra Koti =

Afra Koti or Afra Kati (Persian: افراكتي) may refer to:

- Afra Koti, Babol
- Afra Kati va Lu Kola, Babol County
- Afra Koti-ye Mir Ali Tabar, Babol County
- Afra Koti, Qaem Shahr
- Afra Koti, Bisheh Sar, Qaem Shahr County
