= Khatir =

Khatir or Khater may refer to:

== People ==
- Khatir Afridi (1929–1968), Pakistani poet
- Khatir Ghaznavi (1925–2008), Pakistani writer, poet, and research scholar
- Ahmed Abu Khater, Palestinian and American architect
- Subait Khater (born 1980), Emirati footballer
- Ahmed Abu Khatir (born 1975) Emirati Nasheed singer
- Outhman Khatir (born 1991), Chadian footballer

== Places ==
- Kardgar Khatir, an Iranian village
- Khatir Kola, an Iranian village

== Other uses ==
- Khatir (Sufism); see Warid (Sufism)
- Al Khater, an Arabic tribe

== See also ==
- Aap Ki Khatir (disambiguation), several Indian movies
