= Vaskas, Qaem Shahr =

Village in Mazandaran province, Iran

Vaskas Persian: واسكس
- Village
- Location within Iran
- Coordinates: 36°24′55″N 52°52′02″E
- Country: Iran
- Province: Mazandaran
- County: Qaem Shahr
- District: Central
- Rural District: Aliabad
- Elevation: 81 m (266 ft)

Population (2016)
  - Total: 1,346
- Time zone: UTC+3:30 (IRST)

Vaskas (Persian: واسكس) (Note: Also romanized as Vāskas) is a village in Aliabad Rural District of the Central District in Qaem Shahr County, Mazandaran province, Iran.

Nearby villages are Matan Kola in west, Vosta Kola in east, and Shahrud Kola in southwest.

== Demographics ==
=== Population ===
At the time of the 2006 National Census, the village's population was 1,164 in 287 households. The following census in 2011 counted 1,344 people in 396 households. The 2016 census measured the population of the village as 1,346 people in 467 households.
