= Arateh Dasht =

Neighborhood in Mazandaran province, Iran

Arateh Dasht Persian: ارطه دشت
- Neighborhood
- Country: Iran
- Province: Mazandaran
- County: Qaem Shahr
- District: Central
- City: Arateh

Population (2011)
  - Total: 128
- Time zone: UTC+3:30 (IRST)

Arateh Dasht (Persian: ارطه دشت) is a neighborhood in the city of Arateh in the Central District of Qaem Shahr County, Mazandaran province, Iran.

== Demographics ==
=== Population ===
At the time of the 2006 National Census, Arateh Dasht's population was 45 in 11 households, when it was a village in Bisheh Sar Rural District. The following census in 2011 counted 128 people in 11 households.

In 2010, the village of Qadi Kola-ye Arateh was merged with Abu Kheyl-e Arateh, Arateh Dasht, Bur Kheyl-e Arateh, Juja Deh-e Arateh, Kafshgar Kola-ye Arateh, and Qasem Kheyl-e Arateh to become the city of Arateh.
