= Fulad Kola, Qaem Shahr =

Fulad Kola فولادكلا
- Village
- Location within Iran
- Coordinates: 36°27′02″N 52°53′00″E
- Country: Iran
- Province: Mazandaran
- County: Qaem Shahr
- Bakhsh: Central
- Rural District: Aliabad
- Elevation: 52 m (171 ft)

Population (2016)
  - Total: 874
- Time zone: UTC+3:30 (IRST)

Fulad Kola (Persian: فولادكلا, also Romanized as Fūlād Kolā) is a village in Aliabad Rural District, in the Central District of Qaem Shahr County, Mazandaran Province, Iran. It is a southeastern suburb of Qaem Shahr city, with Abmal village to its east, and Mian Rud village to its southeast.

At the time of the 2006 National Census, the village's population was 756 in 201 households. The following census in 2011 counted 813 people in 251 households. The 2016 census measured the population of the village as 874 people in 289 households.
