= Shah Kola-ye Said Kashi =

Shah Kola-ye Said Kashi شاهكلاسعيدكاشي
- Village
- Country: Iran
- Province: Mazandaran
- County: Qaem Shahr
- Bakhsh: Central
- Rural District: Balatajan

Population (2006)
  - Total: 77
- Time zone: UTC+3:30 (IRST)
  - Summer (DST): UTC+4:30 (IRDT)

Shah Kola-ye Said Kashi (Persian: شاهكلاسعيدكاشي, also Romanized as Shāh Kolā-ye Saʿīd Kāshī) is a village in Balatajan Rural District, in the Central District of Qaem Shahr County, Mazandaran Province, Iran. At the 2006 census, its population was 77, in 24 families.
