= Kerva, Mazandaran =

Kerva كروا
- Village
- Location within Iran
- Coordinates: 36°30′24″N 52°51′21″E
- Country: Iran
- Province: Mazandaran
- County: Qaem Shahr
- Bakhsh: Central
- Rural District: Nowkand Kola

Population (2006)
  - Total: 503
- Time zone: UTC+3:30 (IRST)
  - Summer (DST): UTC+4:30 (IRDT)

Kerva (Persian: كروا, also Romanized as Kervā; also known as Bālā Gervā-ye ‘Olyā, Bālā Karvā, and Bālā Kervā) is a village in Nowkand Kola Rural District, in the Central District of Qaem Shahr County, Mazandaran Province, Iran. At the 2006 census, its population was 503, in 137 families.
