= Fenderi-ye Nam Avar Kola =

Fenderi-ye Nam Avar Kola فندري نماوركلا
- Village
- Location within Iran
- Coordinates: 36°27′00″N 52°47′00″E
- Country: Iran
- Province: Mazandaran
- County: Qaem Shahr
- Bakhsh: Central
- Rural District: Balatajan

Population (2006)
  - Total: 466
- Time zone: UTC+3:30 (IRST)
  - Summer (DST): UTC+4:30 (IRDT)

Fenderi-ye Nam Avar Kola (Persian: فندري نماوركلا, also Romanized as Fenderī-ye Nām Āvar Kolā; also known as Fenderī-ye Nām Āvar) is a village in Balatajan Rural District, in the Central District of Qaem Shahr County, Mazandaran Province, Iran. At the 2006 census, its population was 466, in 125 families.
