= Vaki Kola =

Vaki Kola واكي كلا
- Village
- Location within Iran
- Coordinates: 36°27′05″N 52°45′47″E
- Country: Iran
- Province: Mazandaran
- County: Qaem Shahr
- Bakhsh: Central
- Rural District: Balatajan

Population (2006)
  - Total: 267
- Time zone: UTC+3:30 (IRST)
  - Summer (DST): UTC+4:30 (IRDT)

Vaki Kola (Persian: واكي كلا, also Romanized as Vākī Kolā) is a village in Balatajan Rural District, in the Central District of Qaem Shahr County, Mazandaran Province, Iran. At the 2006 census, its population was 267, in 67 families.
