= Qadi Kola =

Qadi Kola or Qadi Kala (Persian: قاديكلا) may refer to:

- Qadi Kola, Babol
- Qadi Kola, Qaem Shahr
- Qadi Kola-ye Arateh, Qaem Shahr County
- Qadi Kola-ye Bozorg, Qaem Shahr County
- Qadi Kola, Sari
- Qadi Kola, Chahardangeh, Sari County
