= Bala Rostam Hajji =

Bala Rostam Hajji بالارستم حاجي
- Village
- Location within Iran
- Coordinates: 36°30′40″N 52°48′28″E
- Country: Iran
- Province: Mazandaran
- County: Qaem Shahr
- Bakhsh: Central
- Rural District: Balatajan

Population (2006)
  - Total: 282
- Time zone: UTC+3:30 (IRST)
  - Summer (DST): UTC+4:30 (IRDT)

Bala Rostam Hajji (Persian: بالارستم حاجي, also Romanized as Bālā Rostam Ḩājjī; also known as Bālā Rostam Kolā) is a village in Balatajan Rural District, in the Central District of Qaem Shahr County, Mazandaran Province, Iran. At the 2006 census, its population was 282, in 85 families.
