= Rangriz Kola =

Rangriz Kola رنگريزكلا
- Village
- Location within Iran
- Coordinates: 36°25′11″N 52°48′53″E
- Country: Iran
- Province: Mazandaran
- County: Qaem Shahr
- Bakhsh: Central
- Rural District: Balatajan

Population (2006)
  - Total: 513
- Time zone: UTC+3:30 (IRST)
  - Summer (DST): UTC+4:30 (IRDT)

Rangriz Kola (Persian: رنگريزكلا, also Romanized as Rangrīz Kolā; also known as Rangraz Kolā and Rengraz Kalā) is a village in Balatajan Rural District, in the Central District of Qaem Shahr County, Mazandaran Province, Iran. At the 2006 census, its population was 513, in 130 families.
