= Furija =

Furija فوريجا
- Village
- Location within Iran
- Coordinates: 36°29′56″N 52°49′55″E
- Country: Iran
- Province: Mazandaran
- County: Qaem Shahr
- Bakhsh: Central
- Rural District: Nowkand Kola

Population (2006)
  - Total: 24
- Time zone: UTC+3:30 (IRST)
  - Summer (DST): UTC+4:30 (IRDT)

Furija (Persian: فوريجا, also Romanized as Fūrījā; also known as Pūrījā) is a village in Nowkand Kola Rural District, in the Central District of Qaem Shahr County, Mazandaran Province, Iran. At the 2006 census, its population was 24, in 10 families.
