= Juja Deh-e Arateh =

Neighborhood in Mazandaran province, Iran

Juja Deh-e Arateh Persian: جوجاده ارطه
- Neighborhood
- Location within Iran
- Coordinates: 36°29′19″N 52°57′37″E
- Country: Iran
- Province: Mazandaran
- County: Qaem Shahr
- District: Central
- City: Arateh

Population (2011)
  - Total: 1,836
- Time zone: UTC+3:30 (IRST)

Juja Deh-e Arateh (Persian: جوجاده ارطه) (Note: Also romanized as Jūjā Deh-e Araţeh) is a neighborhood in the city of Arateh in the Central District of Qaem Shahr County, Mazandaran province, Iran.

== Demographics ==
=== Population ===
At the time of the 2006 National Census, Juja Deh-e Arateh's population was 1,785 in 445 households, when it was a village in Bisheh Sar Rural District. The following census in 2011 counted 1,836 people in 538 households.

In 2010, the village of Qadi Kola-ye Arateh was merged with Abu Kheyl-e Arateh, Arateh Dasht, Bur Kheyl-e Arateh, Juja Deh-e Arateh, Kafshgar Kola-ye Arateh, and Qasem Kheyl-e Arateh to become the city of Arateh.
