= Abjar =

Abjar ابجر
- village
- Location within Iran
- Coordinates: 36°33′30″N 52°54′28″E
- Country: Iran
- Province: Mazandaran
- County: Qaem Shahr
- Bakhsh: Central
- Rural District: Nowkand Kola

Population (2016)
  - Total: 494
- Time zone: UTC+3:30 (IRST)
  - Summer (DST): UTC+4:30 (IRDT)
- Statistical code: 021053

Abjar (Persian: ابجر, also Romanized as Ābjar) is a village in Nowkand Kola Rural District, in the Central District of Qaem Shahr County, Mazandaran Province, Iran. At the 2006 census, its population was 571, in 149 families.
