= Choft Sar =

Choft Sar or Cheft Sar (Persian: چفت سر) may refer to:

- Choft Sar, Babol
- Choft Sar, Qaem Shahr
- Cheft Sar, Sari
