= Barf Kola =

Barf Kola بارفكلا
- Village
- Location within Iran
- Coordinates: 36°29′49″N 52°48′25″E
- Country: Iran
- Province: Mazandaran
- County: Qaem Shahr
- Bakhsh: Central
- Rural District: Balatajan

Population (2006)
  - Total: 253
- Time zone: UTC+3:30 (IRST)
  - Summer (DST): UTC+4:30 (IRDT)

Barf Kola (Persian: بارفكلا, also Romanized as Bārf Kolā; also known as Bārfīkolā) is a village in Balatajan Rural District, in the Central District of Qaem Shahr County, Mazandaran Province, Iran. At the 2006 census, its population was 253, in 73 families.
