= Gazneh Kola =

Coordinates: 36°29′24″N 52°46′59″E

Gazneh Kola گزنه كلا
- Village
- Interactive map of Gazneh Kola
- Country: Iran
- Province: Mazandaran
- County: Qaem Shahr
- Bakhsh: Central
- Rural District: Balatajan

Population (2006)
  - Total: 90
- Time zone: UTC+3:30 (IRST)
  - Summer (DST): UTC+4:30 (IRDT)

Gazneh Kola (Persian: گزنه كلا, also Romanized as Gazneh Kolā) is a village in Balatajan Rural District, in the Central District of Qaem Shahr County, Mazandaran Province, Iran. At the 2006 census, its population was 90, in 24 families.
