= Torkaman Kheyl =

Torkaman Kheyl تركمن خيل
- Village
- Location within Iran
- Coordinates: 36°27′16″N 52°47′41″E
- Country: Iran
- Province: Mazandaran
- County: Qaem Shahr
- Bakhsh: Central
- Rural District: Balatajan

Population (2006)
  - Total: 257
- Time zone: UTC+3:30 (IRST)
  - Summer (DST): UTC+4:30 (IRDT)

Torkaman Kheyl (Persian: تركمن خيل, also Romanized as Torkamān Kheyl) is a village in Balatajan Rural District, in the Central District of Qaem Shahr County, Mazandaran Province, Iran. At the 2006 census, its population was 257, in 72 families.
