= Malek Kheyl =

Malek Kheyl ملک خيل
- Village
- Location within Iran
- Coordinates: 36°24′53″N 52°46′09″E
- Country: Iran
- Province: Mazandaran
- County: Qaem Shahr
- Bakhsh: Central
- Rural District: Balatajan

Population (2006)
  - Total: 864
- Time zone: UTC+3:30 (IRST)
  - Summer (DST): UTC+4:30 (IRDT)

Malek Kheyl (Persian: ملک خيل) is a village in Balatajan Rural District, in the Central District of Qaem Shahr County, Mazandaran Province, Iran. At the 2006 census, its population was 864, in 228 families.
