= Dashtian =

Dashtian دشتيان
- Village
- Location within Iran
- Coordinates: 36°31′15″N 52°50′08″E
- Country: Iran
- Province: Mazandaran
- County: Qaem Shahr
- Bakhsh: Central
- Rural District: Nowkand Kola

Population (2006)
  - Total: 34
- Time zone: UTC+3:30 (IRST)
  - Summer (DST): UTC+4:30 (IRDT)

Dashtian (Persian: دشتيان, also Romanized as Dashtīān) is a village in Nowkand Kola Rural District, in the Central District of Qaem Shahr County, Mazandaran Province, Iran. At the 2006 census, its population was 34, in 12 families.
