= Shahrak-e Yasrab =

Town in Mazandaran province, Iran

Shahrak-e Yasrab Persian: شهرک يثرب
- Town
- Location within Iran
- Coordinates: 36°27′58″N 52°54′32″E
- Country: Iran
- Province: Mazandaran
- County: Qaem Shahr
- District: Central
- Rural District: Aliabad

Population (2016)
  - Total: 4,055
- Time zone: UTC+3:30 (IRST)

Shahrak-e Yasrab (Persian: شهرک يثرب) (Note: Also romanized as Shahrak-e Yas̱rab, lit. 'Yasreb Town') is a planned town in Aliabad Rural District of the Central District in Qaem Shahr County, Mazandaran province, Iran.

The town is southeast of Qaem Shahr city, with Laharem Taluk village just east of the town.

== Demographics ==
=== Population ===
At the time of the 2006 National Census, the town's population was 5,126 in 1,328 households. The following census in 2011 counted 4,535 people in 1,317 households. The 2016 census measured the population of the town as 4,055 people in 1,303 households, the most populous in its rural district.
