= Khonar Darvish =

Khonar Darvish خناردرويش
- Village
- Country: Iran
- Province: Mazandaran
- County: Qaem Shahr
- Bakhsh: Central
- Rural District: Nowkand Kola

Population (2006)
  - Total: 111
- Time zone: UTC+3:30 (IRST)
  - Summer (DST): UTC+4:30 (IRDT)

Khonar Darvish (Persian: خناردرويش, also Romanized as Khonār Darvīsh) is a village in the Central District of Qaem Shahr County, Mazandaran Province, Iran. At the 2006 census, its population was 111, in 34 families.
