= Chaft-e Kola =

Chaft-e Kola چفت كلا
- Village
- Location within Iran
- Coordinates: 36°25′38″N 52°48′48″E
- Country: Iran
- Province: Mazandaran
- County: Qaem Shahr
- Bakhsh: Central
- Rural District: Balatajan

Population (2006)
  - Total: 778
- Time zone: UTC+3:30 (IRST)
  - Summer (DST): UTC+4:30 (IRDT)

Chaft-e Kola (Persian: چفت كلا, also Romanized as Chaft-e Kolā; also known as Chāfteh Kolā) is a village in Balatajan Rural District, in the Central District of Qaem Shahr County, Mazandaran Province, Iran. At the 2006 census, its population was 778, in 188 families.
