= Owji Talar =

Owji Talar اوجي تالار
- Village
- Location within Iran
- Coordinates: 36°31′04″N 52°47′11″E
- Country: Iran
- Province: Mazandaran
- County: Qaem Shahr
- Bakhsh: Central
- Rural District: Balatajan

Population (2006)
  - Total: 264
- Time zone: UTC+3:30 (IRST)
  - Summer (DST): UTC+4:30 (IRDT)

Ouji Talar (Persian: اوجي تالار, also Romanized as Oujī Tālār; also known as Ojī Tālār and Ūchītālār) is a village in Balatajan Rural District, in the Central District of Qaem Shahr County, Mazandaran Province, Iran. At the 2006 census, its population was 264, in 79 families.
