= Kafshgar Kola-ye Arateh =

Neighborhood in Mazandaran province, Iran

Kafshgar Kola-ye Arateh Persian: كفشگركلا ارطه
- Neighborhood
- Location within Iran
- Coordinates: 36°29′58″N 52°57′04″E
- Country: Iran
- Province: Mazandaran
- County: Qaem Shahr
- District: Central
- City: Arateh

Population (2011)
  - Total: 2,067
- Time zone: UTC+3:30 (IRST)

Kafshgar Kola-ye Arateh (Persian: كفشگركلاارطه) (Note: Also romanized as Kafshgar Kolā-ye Araţeh and Kafshgar Kolā-ye Arţeh; also known as Kafshgar Kolā) is a neighborhood in the city of Arateh in the Central District of Qaem Shahr County, Mazandaran province, Iran.

== Demographics ==
=== Population ===
At the time of the 2006 National Census, Kafshgar Kola-ye Arateh's population was 1,852 in 476 households, when it was a village in Bisheh Sar Rural District. The following census in 2011 counted 2,067 people in 617 households.

In 2010, the village of Qadi Kola-ye Arateh was merged with Abu Kheyl-e Arateh, Arateh Dasht, Bur Kheyl-e Arateh, Juja Deh-e Arateh, Kafshgar Kola-ye Arateh, and Qasem Kheyl-e Arateh to become the city of Arateh.
