= Gileh Kola =

Gileh Kola گيله كلا
- Village
- Location within Iran
- Coordinates: 36°35′22″N 52°39′35″E
- Country: Iran
- Province: Mazandaran
- County: Qaem Shahr
- Bakhsh: Central
- Rural District: Nowkand Kola

Population (2006)
  - Total: 501
- Time zone: UTC+3:30 (IRST)
  - Summer (DST): UTC+4:30 (IRDT)

Gileh Kola (Persian: گيله كلا, also Romanized as Gīleh Kolā) is a village in Nowkand Kola Rural District, in the Central District of Qaem Shahr County, Mazandaran Province, Iran. At the 2006 census, its population was 501, in 132 families.
