= Kasegar Kola =

Kasegar Kola كاسگر كلا
- Village
- Location within Iran
- Coordinates: 36°30′30″N 52°53′53″E
- Country: Iran
- Province: Mazandaran
- County: Qaem Shahr
- Bakhsh: Central
- Rural District: Nowkand Kola

Population (2006)
  - Total: 564
- Time zone: UTC+3:30 (IRST)
  - Summer (DST): UTC+4:30 (IRDT)

Kasegar Kola (Persian: كاسگر كلا, also Romanized as Kāsegar Kolā; also known as Kāsehgar Kalā and Kāsehgar Kolā) is a village in Nowkand Kola Rural District, in the Central District of Qaem Shahr County, Mazandaran Province, Iran. At the 2006 census, its population was 564, in 162 families.
