= Vosta Kola, Qaem Shahr =

Village in Mazandaran province, Iran

Vosta Kola Persian: وسطی كلا
- Village
- Location within Iran
- Coordinates: 36°25′08″N 52°53′02″E
- Country: Iran
- Province: Mazandaran
- County: Qaem Shahr
- District: Central
- Rural District: Aliabad
- Elevation: 85 m (279 ft)

Population (2016)
  - Total: 1,389
- Time zone: UTC+3:30 (IRST)

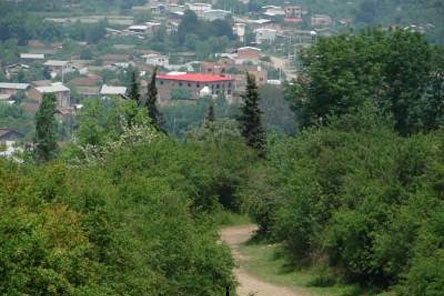
View of Vosti Kola

Vosta Kola (Persian: وسطی كلا) (Note: Also romanized as Vosţá Kolā; also known as Vasaţ Kolā) is a village in Aliabad Rural District of the Central District in Qaem Shahr County, Mazandaran province, Iran.

It's connected to Qaem Shahr city in north, Qadi Kola-ye Bozorg village in northeast, and Vaskas in west.

== Demographics ==
=== Population ===
At the time of the 2006 National Census, the village's population was 1,479 in 401 households. The following census in 2011 counted 1,539 people in 460 households. The 2016 census measured the population of the village as 1,389 people in 472 households.
