= Pain Jadeh =

Pain Jadeh پايين جاده
- Village
- Location within Iran
- Coordinates: 36°33′24″N 52°55′25″E
- Country: Iran
- Province: Mazandaran
- County: Qaem Shahr
- Bakhsh: Central
- Rural District: Nowkand Kola

Population (2006)
  - Total: 504
- Time zone: UTC+3:30 (IRST)
  - Summer (DST): UTC+4:30 (IRDT)

Pain Jadeh (Persian: پايين جاده, also Romanized as Pā’īn Jādeh) is a village in Nowkand Kola Rural District, in the Central District of Qaem Shahr County, Mazandaran Province, Iran. At the 2006 census, its population was 504, in 129 families.
