= Chamrandeh =

Coordinates: 36°25′22″N 52°49′20″E

Chamrandeh چمرانده
- Village
- Interactive map of Chamrandeh
- Country: Iran
- Province: Mazandaran
- County: Qaem Shahr
- Bakhsh: Central
- Rural District: Balatajan

Population (2006)
  - Total: 88
- Time zone: UTC+3:30 (IRST)
  - Summer (DST): UTC+4:30 (IRDT)

Chamrandeh (Persian: چمرانده, also Romanized as Chamrāndeh) is a village in Balatajan Rural District, in the Central District of Qaem Shahr County, Mazandaran Province, Iran. At the 2006 census, its population was 88, in 28 families.
