= Shami Kola =

Shami Kola شاميكلا
- Village
- Location within Iran
- Coordinates: 36°27′00″N 52°47′00″E
- Country: Iran
- Province: Mazandaran
- County: Qaem Shahr
- Bakhsh: Central
- Rural District: Balatajan

Population (2006)
  - Total: 280
- Time zone: UTC+3:30 (IRST)
  - Summer (DST): UTC+4:30 (IRDT)

Shami Kola (Persian: شاميكلا, also Romanized as Shāmī Kolā) is a village in Balatajan Rural District, in the Central District of Qaem Shahr County, Mazandaran Province, Iran. At the 2006 census, its population was 280, in 68 families.
