= Macheh Bon =

Macheh Bon مچه بن
- Village
- Location within Iran
- Coordinates: 36°23′24″N 52°51′22″E
- Country: Iran
- Province: Mazandaran
- County: Qaem Shahr
- Bakhsh: Central
- Rural District: Aliabad
- Elevation: 119 m (390 ft)

Population (2016)
  - Total: 381
- Time zone: UTC+3:30 (IRST)

Macheh Bon (Persian: مچه بن; also known as Haft Tan) is a village in Aliabad Rural District, in the Central District of Qaem Shahr County, Mazandaran Province, Iran. Its on the road between Qaem Shahr and Tehran.

At the time of the 2006 National Census, the village's population was 332 in 82 households. The following census in 2011 counted 362 people in 112 households. The 2016 census measured the population of the village as 381 people in 136 households.
