= Mehdiabad, Qaem Shahr =

Village in Mazandaran province, Iran

Mehdiabad Persian: مهدي اباد
- Village
- Location within Iran
- Coordinates: 36°28′37″N 52°56′23″E
- Country: Iran
- Province: Mazandaran
- County: Qaem Shahr
- District: Central
- Rural District: Bisheh Sar

Population (2016)
  - Total: 422
- Time zone: UTC+3:30 (IRST)

Mehdiabad (Persian: مهدي اباد) (Note: Also romanized as Mehdīābād; also known as Laharem Kharabeh (لهرم خرابه), also romanized as Lahārem Kharābeh and Lahārom Kharābeh) is a village in Bisheh Sar Rural District of the Central District in Qaem Shahr County, Mazandaran province, Iran.

== Demographics ==
=== Population ===
At the time of the 2006 National Census, the village's population was 486 in 122 households. The following census in 2011 counted 466 people in 141 households. The 2016 census measured the population of the village as 422 people in 150 households.
