= Seraj Kola =

Village in Mazandaran province, Iran

Seraj Kola Persian: سراجكلا
- Village
- Location within Iran
- Coordinates: 36°28′57″N 52°48′46″E
- Country: Iran
- Province: Mazandaran
- County: Qaem Shahr
- District: Central
- Rural District: Balatajan

Population (2016)
  - Total: 1,845
- Time zone: UTC+3:30 (IRST)

Seraj Kola (Persian: سراجكلا) (Note: Also romanized as Serāj Kolā; also known as Serāj Kolā-ye Pā’īn) is a village in Balatajan Rural District of the Central District in Qaem Shahr County, Mazandaran province, Iran.

== Demographics ==
=== Population ===
At the time of the 2006 National Census, the village's population was 1,246 in 329 households. The following census in 2011 counted 1,370 people in 381 households. The 2016 census measured the population of the village as 1,845 people in 602 households.
