= Fulad Kola =

Fulad Kola (Persian: فولادكلا) may refer to:

- Fulad Kola, Babol
- Fulad Kola, Babolsar
- Fulad Kola, Nur
- Fulad Kola, Qaem Shahr
