= Lamuk, Iran =

Lamuk (Persian: لموك) may refer to:

- Bala Lamuk
- Pain Lamuk
