= Seyyed Abu Saleh =

Village in Mazandaran province, Iran

Seyyed Abu Saleh Persian: سيدابوصالح
- Village
- Location within Iran
- Coordinates: 36°26′12″N 53°00′33″E
- Country: Iran
- Province: Mazandaran
- County: Qaem Shahr
- District: Central
- Rural District: Kuhsaran

Population (2016)
  - Total: 240
- Time zone: UTC+3:30 (IRST)

Seyyed Abu Saleh (Persian: سيدابوصالح) (Note: Also romanized as Seyyed Abū Şāleḩ; also known as Maleh and Malhe) is a village in Kuhsaran Rural District of the Central District in Qaem Shahr County, Mazandaran province, Iran.

== Demographics ==
=== Population ===
At the time of the 2006 National Census, the village's population was 336 in 113 households. The following census in 2011 counted 273 people in 104 households. The 2016 census measured the population of the village as 240 people in 102 households.
