= Bagh Dasht, Mazandaran =

Village in Mazandaran province, Iran

Bagh Dasht Persian: باغدشت
- Village
- Location within Iran
- Coordinates: 36°26′00″N 52°44′31″E
- Country: Iran
- Province: Mazandaran
- County: Qaem Shahr
- District: Central
- Rural District: Balatajan

Population (2016)
  - Total: 2,826
- Time zone: UTC+3:30 (IRST)

Bagh Dasht (Persian: باغدشت) (Note: Also romanized as Bāgh Dasht) is a village in Balatajan Rural District of the Central District in Qaem Shahr County, Mazandaran province, Iran.

== Demographics ==
=== Population ===
At the time of the 2006 National Census, the village's population was 2,651 in 695 households. The following census in 2011 counted 2,758 people in 832 households. The 2016 census measured the population of the village as 2,826 people in 949 households.
