= Bala Afrakoti =

Village in Mazandaran province, Iran

Bala Afrakoti Persian: بالاافراكتي
- Village
- Location within Iran
- Coordinates: 36°28′49″N 52°54′54″E
- Country: Iran
- Province: Mazandaran
- County: Qaem Shahr
- District: Central
- Rural District: Bisheh Sar

Population (2016)
  - Total: 841
- Time zone: UTC+3:30 (IRST)

Bala Afrakoti (Persian: بالاافراكتي) (Note: Also romanized as Bālā Afrākotī) is a village in Bisheh Sar Rural District of the Central District in Qaem Shahr County, Mazandaran province, Iran.

== Demographics ==
=== Population ===
At the time of the 2006 National Census, the village's population was 881 in 237 households. The following census in 2011 counted 893 people in 274 households. The 2016 census measured the population of the village as 841 people in 279 households, the most populous in its rural district.
