= Hajjiabad, Qaem Shahr =

Village in Mazandaran province, Iran

Hajjiabad Persian: حاجي اباد
- Village
- Location within Iran
- Coordinates: 36°30′22″N 52°52′54″E
- Country: Iran
- Province: Mazandaran
- County: Qaem Shahr
- District: Central
- Rural District: Nowkand Kola

Population (2016)
  - Total: 1,300
- Time zone: UTC+3:30 (IRST)

Hajjiabad (Persian: حاجي اباد) (Note: Also romanized as Ḩājjīābād) is a village in Nowkand Kola Rural District of the Central District in Qaem Shahr County, Mazandaran province, Iran.

== Demographics ==
=== Population ===
At the time of the 2006 National Census, the village's population was 594 in 150 households. The following census in 2011 counted 563 people in 162 households. The 2016 census measured the population of the village as 1,300 people in 170 households.
