= Eskandar Kola =

Village in Mazandaran province, Iran

Eskandar Kola Persian: اسكندركلا
- Village
- Location within Iran
- Coordinates: 36°26′49″N 52°49′49″E
- Country: Iran
- Province: Mazandaran
- County: Qaem Shahr
- District: Central
- Rural District: Aliabad

Population (2016)
  - Total: 2,118
- Time zone: UTC+3:30 (IRST)

Eskandar Kola (Persian: اسكندركلا) (Note: Also romanized as Eskandar Kolā) is a village in Aliabad Rural District of the Central District in Qaem Shahr County, Mazandaran province, Iran. It is a western suburb of Qaem Shahr city.

== Demographics ==
=== Population ===
At the time of the 2006 National Census, the village's population was 1,882 in 493 households. The following census in 2011 counted 2,051 people in 602 households. The 2016 census measured the population of the village as 2,118 people in 688 households.
