= Choft Sar, Qaem Shahr =

Choft Sar چفت سر
- Village
- Location within Iran
- Coordinates: 36°40′59″N 52°56′07″E
- Country: Iran
- Province: Mazandaran
- County: Qaem Shahr
- Bakhsh: Central
- Rural District: Nowkand Kola

Population (2006)
  - Total: 172
- Time zone: UTC+3:30 (IRST)
  - Summer (DST): UTC+4:30 (IRDT)

Choft Sar (Persian: چفت سر; also known as Choft Sar-e Shūrkā) is a village in Nowkand Kola Rural District, in the Central District of Qaem Shahr County, Mazandaran Province, Iran. At the 2006 census, its population was 172, in 42 families.
