= Hajji Kola-ye Arazlu =

Hajji Kola-ye Arazlu حاجي كلاارزلو
- Village
- Location within Iran
- Coordinates: 36°23′45″N 52°47′21″E
- Country: Iran
- Province: Mazandaran
- County: Qaem Shahr
- Bakhsh: Central
- Rural District: Balatajan

Population (2006)
  - Total: 558
- Time zone: UTC+3:30 (IRST)
  - Summer (DST): UTC+4:30 (IRDT)

Hajji Kola-ye Arazlu (Persian: حاجي كلاارزلو, also Romanized as Ḩājjī Kolā-ye Ārazlū; also known as Ḩājī Kolā, Ḩājjī Kalā, Ḩājjī Kolā, and Ḩājjī Kolā Sanam) is a village in Balatajan Rural District, in the Central District of Qaem Shahr County, Mazandaran Province, Iran. At the 2006 census, its population was 558, in 152 families.
