= Par Chinak =

Village in Mazandaran province, Iran

Par Chinak Persian: پرچينك
- Village
- Location within Iran
- Coordinates: 36°27′02″N 53°00′41″E
- Country: Iran
- Province: Mazandaran
- County: Qaem Shahr
- District: Central
- Rural District: Kuhsaran

Population (2016)
  - Total: 61
- Time zone: UTC+3:30 (IRST)

Par Chinak (Persian: پرچينك) (Note: Also romanized as Par Chīnak) is a village in Kuhsaran Rural District of the Central District in Qaem Shahr County, Mazandaran province, Iran.

== Demographics ==
=== Population ===
At the time of the 2006 National Census, the village's population was 103 in 29 households. The following census in 2011 counted 62 people in 22 households. The 2016 census measured the population of the village as 61 people in 25 households.
