= Malek Kola =

Village in Mazandaran province, Iran

Malek Kola Persian: ملک کلا
- Village
- Location within Iran
- Coordinates: 36°26′07″N 52°50′14″E
- Country: Iran
- Province: Mazandaran
- County: Qaem Shahr
- District: Central
- Rural District: Aliabad
- Elevation: 79 m (259 ft)

Population (2016)
  - Total: 3,595
- Time zone: UTC+3:30 (IRST)

Malek Kola (Persian: ملک کلا) (Note: Also romanized as Malek Kolā) is a village in Aliabad Rural District of the Central District in Qaem Shahr County, Mazandaran province, Iran. It is a southwestern suburb of Qaem Shahr city.

== Demographics ==
=== Population ===
At the time of the 2006 National Census, the village's population was 2,525 in 662 households. The following census in 2011 counted 3,782 people in 1,161 households. The 2016 census measured the population of the village as 3,595 people in 1,168 households.
