= Ahangar Kola, Qaem Shahr =

Village in Mazandaran province, Iran

Ahangar Kola Persian: اهنگركلا
- Village
- Location within Iran
- Coordinates: 36°26′06″N 52°55′21″E
- Country: Iran
- Province: Mazandaran
- County: Qaem Shahr
- District: Central
- Rural District: Aliabad

Population (2016)
  - Total: 1,512
- Time zone: UTC+3:30 (IRST)

Ahangar Kola (Persian: اهنگركلا) (Note: Also romanized as Āhangar Kalā, Ahangar Kela, Āhangar Kelā, and Āhangar Kolā; also known as Āhangar Kolā-ye Bīsheh Sar)} is a village in Aliabad Rural District of the Central District in Qaem Shahr County, Mazandaran province, Iran.

== Demographics ==
=== Population ===
At the time of the 2006 National Census, the village's population was 1,554 in 432 households. The following census in 2011 counted 1,510 people in 482 households. The 2016 census measured the population of the village as 1,512 people in 524 households.
