= Meydan Sar =

Village in Mazandaran province, Iran

Meydan Sar Persian: ميدانسر
- Village
- Location within Iran
- Coordinates: 36°26′00″N 52°46′26″E
- Country: Iran
- Province: Mazandaran
- County: Qaem Shahr
- District: Central
- Rural District: Balatajan

Population (2016)
  - Total: 1,043
- Time zone: UTC+3:30 (IRST)

Meydan Sar (Persian: ميدانسر) (Note: Also romanized as Meydān Sar) is a village in Balatajan Rural District of the Central District in Qaem Shahr County, Mazandaran province, Iran.

== Demographics ==
=== Population ===
At the time of the 2006 National Census, the village's population was 1,001 in 253 households. The following census in 2011 counted 1,017 people in 299 households. The 2016 census measured the population of the village as 1,043 people in 342 households.
