= Gavan Ahangar =

Village in Mazandaran province, Iran

Gavan Ahangar Persian: گاوان اهنگر
- Village
- Location within Iran
- Coordinates: 36°25′18″N 52°44′34″E
- Country: Iran
- Province: Mazandaran
- County: Qaem Shahr
- District: Central
- Rural District: Balatajan

Population (2016)
  - Total: 1,016
- Time zone: UTC+3:30 (IRST)

Gavan Ahangar (Persian: گاوان اهنگر) (Note: Also romanized as Gāvān Āhangar) is a village in Balatajan Rural District of the Central District in Qaem Shahr County, Mazandaran province, Iran.

== Demographics ==
=== Population ===
At the time of the 2006 National Census, the village's population was 1,138 in 274 households. The following census in 2011 counted 1,155 people in 329 households. The 2016 census measured the population of the village as 1,016 people in 342 households.
