= Kardgar Khatir =

Kardgar Khatir كاردگرخطير
- Village
- Country: Iran
- Province: Mazandaran
- County: Qaem Shahr
- Bakhsh: Central
- Rural District: Balatajan

Population (2006)
  - Total: 310
- Time zone: UTC+3:30 (IRST)
  - Summer (DST): UTC+4:30 (IRDT)

Kardgar Khatir (Persian: كاردگرخطير, also Romanized as Kārdgar Khaţīr) is a village in Balatajan Rural District, in the Central District of Qaem Shahr County, Mazandaran Province, Iran. At the 2006 census, its population was 310, in 77 families.
