= Chaleh Zamin =

Chaleh Zamin چاله زمين
- Village
- Location within Iran
- Coordinates: 36°27′30″N 52°53′14″E
- Country: Iran
- Province: Mazandaran
- County: Qaem Shahr
- Bakhsh: Central
- Rural District: Aliabad

Population (2016)
  - Total: 7
- Time zone: UTC+3:30 (IRST)

Chaleh Zamin (Persian: چاله زمين, also Romanized as Chāleh Zamīn) is a village in Aliabad Rural District, in the Central District of Qaem Shahr County, Mazandaran Province, Iran.

At the time of the 2006 National Census, the village's population was 29 in 11 households. The following census in 2011 counted 23 people in 11 households. The 2016 census measured the population of the village as seven people in four households.
