= Bala Joneyd-e Lakpol =

Village in Mazandaran province, Iran

Bala Joneyd-e Lakpol Persian: بالاجنيدلاك پل
- Village
- Location within Iran
- Coordinates: 36°28′47″N 52°48′12″E
- Country: Iran
- Province: Mazandaran
- County: Qaem Shahr
- District: Central
- Rural District: Balatajan

Population (2016)
  - Total: 1,598
- Time zone: UTC+3:30 (IRST)

Bala Joneyd-e Lakpol (Persian: بالاجنيدلاك پل) (Note: Also romanized as Bālā Joneyd-e Lākpol) is a village in Balatajan Rural District of the Central District in Qaem Shahr County, Mazandaran province, Iran.

== Demographics ==
=== Population ===
At the time of the 2006 National Census, the village's population was 1,688 in 455 households. The following census in 2011 counted 1,670 people in 504 households. The 2016 census measured the population of the village as 1,598 people in 563 households.
