= Chepi, Iran =

Chepi چپی
- Village
- Location within Iran
- Coordinates: 36°25′34″N 52°57′52″E
- Country: Iran
- Province: Mazandaran
- County: Qaem Shahr
- Bakhsh: Central
- Rural District: Aliabad
- Elevation: 147 m (482 ft)

Population (2016)
  - Total: 166
- Time zone: UTC+3:30 (IRST)

Chepi (Persian: چپی, also Romanized as Chepī and Chapī) is a village in Aliabad Rural District, in the Central District of Qaem Shahr County, Mazandaran Province, Iran.

At the time of the 2006 National Census, the village's population was 216 in 70 households. The following census in 2011 counted 202 people in 95 households. The 2016 census measured the population of the village as 166 people in 67 households.
