= Sheykh Rajeh =

Village in Mazandaran province, Iran

Sheykh Rajeh Persian: شيخ رجه
- Village
- Location within Iran
- Coordinates: 36°27′48″N 52°55′51″E
- Country: Iran
- Province: Mazandaran
- County: Qaem Shahr
- District: Central
- Rural District: Bisheh Sar

Population (2016)
  - Total: 174
- Time zone: UTC+3:30 (IRST)

Sheikh Rajeh (Persian: شيخ رجه) is a village in Bisheh Sar Rural District of the Central District in Qaem Shahr County, Mazandaran province, Iran.

== Demographics ==
=== Population ===
At the time of the 2006 National Census, the village's population was 179 in 50 households. The following census in 2011 counted 172 people in 56 households. The 2016 census measured the population of the village as 174 people in 59 households.
