= Now Kola =

Now Kola (Persian: نوكلا) may refer to:

- Now Kola, Amol
- Now Kola, Qaem Shahr
