= Qara Kheyl =

Village in Mazandaran province, Iran

Qara Kheyl Persian: قراخيل
- Village
- Location within Iran
- Coordinates: 36°27′24″N 52°47′05″E
- Country: Iran
- Province: Mazandaran
- County: Qaem Shahr
- District: Central
- Rural District: Balatajan

Population (2016)
  - Total: 4,471
- Time zone: UTC+3:30 (IRST)
- Website: qarakheyl.ir

Qara Kheyl (Persian: قراخيل) (Note: Also romanized as Qarā Kheyl; also known as Qovā Kheyl) is a village in Balatajan Rural District of the Central District in Qaem Shahr County, Mazandaran province, Iran.

== Demographics ==
=== Population ===
At the time of the 2006 National Census, the village's population was 4,186 in 1,083 households. The following census in 2011 counted 4,395 people in 1,328 households. The 2016 census measured the population of the village as 4,471 people in 1,459 households, the most populous in its rural district.

== Climate ==
Climate data for Qara Kheyl (normals 1991–2020, extremes 1984–2020); elevation: 14.7m
Month	Jan	Feb	Mar	Apr	May	Jun	Jul	Aug	Sep	Oct	Nov	Dec	Year
Record high °C (°F)	30.4 (86.7)	34.6 (94.3)	36.2 (97.2)	39.0 (102.2)	40.6 (105.1)	39.6 (103.3)	38.2 (100.8)	40.6 (105.1)	40.2 (104.4)	38.6 (101.5)	32.2 (90.0)	28.4 (83.1)	40.6 (105.1)
Mean daily maximum °C (°F)	12.6 (54.7)	12.7 (54.9)	15.5 (59.9)	20.1 (68.2)	25.3 (77.5)	29.1 (84.4)	30.9 (87.6)	31.8 (89.2)	28.7 (83.7)	24.3 (75.7)	18.2 (64.8)	14.1 (57.4)	21.9 (71.5)
Daily mean °C (°F)	7.3 (45.1)	7.7 (45.9)	10.6 (51.1)	14.9 (58.8)	20.3 (68.5)	24.2 (75.6)	26.1 (79.0)	26.5 (79.7)	23.5 (74.3)	18.7 (65.7)	12.8 (55.0)	8.8 (47.8)	16.8 (62.2)
Mean daily minimum °C (°F)	3.1 (37.6)	3.7 (38.7)	6.7 (44.1)	10.8 (51.4)	16.0 (60.8)	20.0 (68.0)	22.2 (72.0)	22.4 (72.3)	19.6 (67.3)	14.4 (57.9)	8.7 (47.7)	4.6 (40.3)	12.7 (54.8)
Record low °C (°F)	−6.0 (21.2)	−5.2 (22.6)	−1.8 (28.8)	0.2 (32.4)	5.4 (41.7)	13.0 (55.4)	16.6 (61.9)	14.2 (57.6)	11.6 (52.9)	4.2 (39.6)	−3.8 (25.2)	−3.6 (25.5)	−6.0 (21.2)
Average precipitation mm (inches)	70.7 (2.78)	66.1 (2.60)	67.6 (2.66)	43.8 (1.72)	27.3 (1.07)	30.1 (1.19)	30.0 (1.18)	33.4 (1.31)	77.1 (3.04)	91.9 (3.62)	110.2 (4.34)	74.5 (2.93)	722.7 (28.44)
Average precipitation days (≥ 1.0 mm)	7.2	7.8	7.7	6.3	4.8	3.9	4.5	4.7	6.9	6.3	7.6	7.2	74.9
Average rainy days	9.5	10.7	13	11.2	7.8	5	5.7	6.5	8	8.1	9.4	9.5	104.4
Average relative humidity (%)	84	84	83	82	78	77	79	78	81	82	84	85	81
Average dew point °C (°F)	4.5 (40.1)	4.9 (40.8)	7.5 (45.5)	11.5 (52.7)	16.1 (61.0)	19.7 (67.5)	21.8 (71.2)	22.1 (71.8)	19.8 (67.6)	15.3 (59.5)	10.0 (50.0)	6.1 (43.0)	13.3 (55.9)
Mean monthly sunshine hours	139	119	131	153	204	222	212	206	166	173	146	137	2,008
Source 1: NOAA
Source 2: IRIMO (extremes)
