= Hardow Rud, Qaem Shahr =

Hardow Rud هردورود
- Village
- Location within Iran
- Coordinates: 36°29′13″N 52°51′21″E
- Country: Iran
- Province: Mazandaran
- County: Qaem Shahr
- Bakhsh: Central
- Rural District: Nowkand Kola

Population (2006)
  - Total: 824
- Time zone: UTC+3:30 (IRST)
  - Summer (DST): UTC+4:30 (IRDT)

Hardow Rud (Persian: هردورود, also Romanized as Hardow Rūd; also known as Hardo Rūd) is a village in Nowkand Kola Rural District, in the Central District of Qaem Shahr County, Mazandaran Province, Iran. At the 2006 census, its population was 824, in 218 families.
