= Seyf Koti =

Village in Mazandaran province, Iran

Seyf Koti Persian: سيفكتي
- Village
- Location within Iran
- Coordinates: 36°26′19″N 52°59′16″E
- Country: Iran
- Province: Mazandaran
- County: Qaem Shahr
- District: Central
- Rural District: Kuhsaran

Population (2016)
  - Total: 100
- Time zone: UTC+3:30 (IRST)

Seyf Koti (Persian: سيفكتي) (Note: Also romanized as Seyf Kotī) is a village in Kuhsaran Rural District of the Central District in Qaem Shahr County, Mazandaran province, Iran.

== Demographics ==
=== Population ===
At the time of the 2006 National Census, the village's population was 143 in 49 households. The following census in 2011 counted 112 people in 40 households. The 2016 census measured the population of the village as 100 people in 46 households.
