= Kelagar Mahalleh, Qaem Shahr =

Village in Mazandaran province, Iran

Kelagar Mahalleh Persian: كلاگرمحله
- Village
- Location within Iran
- Coordinates: 36°29′21″N 52°50′15″E
- Country: Iran
- Province: Mazandaran
- County: Qaem Shahr
- District: Central
- Rural District: Nowkand Kola

Population (2016)
  - Total: 2,110
- Time zone: UTC+3:30 (IRST)

Kelagar Mahalleh (Persian: كلاگرمحله) (Note: Also romanized as Kelāgar Maḩalleh) is a village in Nowkand Kola Rural District of the Central District in Qaem Shahr County, Mazandaran province, Iran.

== Demographics ==
=== Population ===
At the time of the 2006 National Census, the village's population was 2,183 in 589 households. The following census in 2011 counted 2,525 people in 733 households. The 2016 census measured the population of the village as 2,110 people in 690 households.
