= Hajji Kola-ye Sanam =

Hajji Kola-ye Sanam حاجي كلاصنم
- Village
- Location within Iran
- Coordinates: 36°27′34″N 52°49′12″E
- Country: Iran
- Province: Mazandaran
- County: Qaem Shahr
- Bakhsh: Central
- Rural District: Balatajan

Population (2006)
  - Total: 1,010
- Time zone: UTC+3:30 (IRST)
  - Summer (DST): UTC+4:30 (IRDT)

Hajji Kola-ye Sanam (Persian: حاجي كلاصنم, also Romanized as Ḩājjī Kolā-ye Şanam; also known as Ḩājjī Kolā) is a village in Balatajan Rural District, in the Central District of Qaem Shahr County, Mazandaran Province, Iran. At the 2006 census, its population was 1,010, in 243 families.
