= Kar Chang =

Village in Mazandaran province, Iran

Kar Chang Persian: كرچنگ
- Village
- Location within Iran
- Coordinates: 36°26′59″N 52°56′40″E
- Country: Iran
- Province: Mazandaran
- County: Qaem Shahr
- District: Central
- Rural District: Kuhsaran

Population (2016)
  - Total: 143
- Time zone: UTC+3:30 (IRST)

Kar Chang (Persian: كرچنگ) is a village in Kuhsaran Rural District of the Central District in Qaem Shahr County, Mazandaran province, Iran.

== Demographics ==
=== Population ===
At the time of the 2006 National Census, the village's population was 185 in 63 households. The following census in 2011 counted 160 people in 151 households. The 2016 census measured the population of the village as 143 people in 52 households.
