= Div Kola =

Div Kola or Div Kala (Persian: ديوكلا), also rendered as Div Kalay, may refer to:

- Div Kola-ye Alimun, Juybar County
- Div Kola-ye Olya, Qaem Shahr County
- Div Kola-ye Sofla, Qaem Shahr County
