= Har Do Rud =

Har Do Rud or Hardow Rud or Hardo Rud (Persian: هردورود) may refer to:

- Har Do Rud, Nur
- Hardow Rud, Qaem Shahr
