= Khorma Kola =

Village in Mazandaran province, Iran

Khorma Kola Persian: خرماكلا
- Village
- Location within Iran
- Coordinates: 36°27′18″N 52°48′26″E
- Country: Iran
- Province: Mazandaran
- County: Qaem Shahr
- District: Central
- Rural District: Balatajan

Population (2016)
  - Total: 1,088
- Time zone: UTC+3:30 (IRST)

Khorma Kola (Persian: خرماكلا) (Note: Also romanized as Khormā Kolā) is a village in Balatajan Rural District of the Central District in Qaem Shahr County, Mazandaran province, Iran.

== Demographics ==
=== Population ===
At the time of the 2006 National Census, the village's population was 1,104 in 270 households. The following census in 2011 counted 1,125 people in 329 households. The 2016 census measured the population of the village as 1,088 people in 355 households.
