= Denj Kola =

Denj Kola دنجكلا
- Village
- Location within Iran
- Coordinates: 36°26′09″N 52°51′45″E
- Country: Iran
- Province: Mazandaran
- County: Qaem Shahr
- Bakhsh: Central
- Rural District: Aliabad

Population (2016)
  - Total: 346
- Time zone: UTC+3:30 (IRST)

Denj Kola (Persian: دنجكلا, also Romanized as Denj Kolā and Denj Kalā; also known as Denj Sar) is a village in Aliabad Rural District, in the Central District of Qaem Shahr County, Mazandaran Province, Iran. It is south of Qaem Shahr city.

At the time of the 2006 National Census, the village's population was 282 in 70 households. The following census in 2011 counted 374 people in 101 households. The 2016 census measured the population of the village as 346 people in 118 households.
