= Hajji Kola, Qaem Shahr =

Hajji Kola حاجي كلا
- Village
- Location within Iran
- Coordinates: 36°21′21″N 52°49′30″E
- Country: Iran
- Province: Mazandaran
- County: Qaem Shahr
- Bakhsh: Central
- Rural District: Balatajan

Population (2006)
  - Total: 851
- Time zone: UTC+3:30 (IRST)
  - Summer (DST): UTC+4:30 (IRDT)

Hajji Kola (Persian: حاجي كلا, also Romanized as Ḩājjī Kolā) is a village in Balatajan Rural District, in the Central District of Qaem Shahr County, Mazandaran Province, Iran. At the 2006 census, its population was 851, in 215 families.
