= Qasem Kheyl =

Qasem Kheyl may refer to:

- Qasem Khel, Afghanistan
- Qasem Kheyl-e Arateh, Iran
