= Chamaz Koti =

Village in Mazandaran province, Iran

Chamaz Koti Persian: چمازكتي
- Village
- Location within Iran
- Coordinates: 36°29′11″N 52°52′09″E
- Country: Iran
- Province: Mazandaran
- County: Qaem Shahr
- District: Central
- Rural District: Nowkand Kola

Population (2016)
  - Total: 5,436
- Time zone: UTC+3:30 (IRST)

Chamaz Koti (Persian: چمازكتي) (Note: Also romanized as Chamāz Katī, Chamāz Ketī and Chamāz Kotī; also known as Chamāz Kolā) is a village in Nowkand Kola Rural District of the Central District in Qaem Shahr County, Mazandaran province, Iran.

== Demographics ==
=== Population ===
At the time of the 2006 National Census, the village's population was 5,552 in 1,423 households. The following census in 2011 counted 6,113 people in 1,759 households. The 2016 census measured the population of the village as 5,436 people in 1,771 households, the most populous in its rural district.

== "Village of kebabs" ==
The people of Chamaz Koti village are known for several things, one of which being an interest in barbecuing and eating barbeque. In the village, there are a large number of kebab shops that serve people to make a living. The people, especially the youth of this village, have often invited each other to eat kebabs on various occasions for years, with it becoming an almost daily routine. Along with their mutton, cooking of kebab, which has become professional over the years, is one of the things that has brought people from other villages to this place.

== Zarin Nava tomb palace ==
According to the pilgrimage record inside the mausoleum, the name of the deceased is Agha Seyyed Mohammad, the son of Seyyed Ali Zarin Navaei, and this work was registered as one of Iran's national works on March 25, 1379 with the number 3327. Zarin Nava tomb tower (sayze nava in local dialect) is located in Chamazketi village between the old and current cemetery of the place and among the old trees, and agricultural lands surround this complex. The structure was constructed in the 9th century AH.
