= Reykandeh =

Village in Mazandaran province, Iran

Reykandeh Persian: ريكنده
- Village
- Location within Iran
- Coordinates: 36°27′01″N 52°58′24″E
- Country: Iran
- Province: Mazandaran
- County: Qaem Shahr
- District: Central
- Rural District: Kuhsaran

Population (2016)
  - Total: 648
- Time zone: UTC+3:30 (IRST)

Reykandeh (Persian: ريكنده) (Note: Also romanized as Rīkandeh) is a village in Kuhsaran Rural District of the Central District in Qaem Shahr County, Mazandaran province, Iran.

== Demographics ==
=== Population ===
At the time of the 2006 National Census, the village's population was 846 in 268 households. The following census in 2011 counted 658 people in 226 households. The 2016 census measured the population of the village as 648 people in 251 households.
