= Pasha Kola-ye Afrakoti =

Village in Mazandaran province, Iran

Pasha Kola-ye Afrakoti Persian: پاشاكلا افرا كتي
- Village
- Location within Iran
- Coordinates: 36°28′57″N 52°54′46″E
- Country: Iran
- Province: Mazandaran
- County: Qaem Shahr
- District: Central
- Rural District: Bisheh Sar

Population (2016)
  - Total: 367
- Time zone: UTC+3:30 (IRST)

Pasha Kola-ye Afrakoti (Persian: پاشاكلا افرا كتي) (Note: Also romanized as Pāshā Kolā-ye Afrākotī; also known as Pāshā Kalā, Pāshā Kolā, and Pāshā Kūlā) is a village in Bisheh Sar Rural District of the Central District in Qaem Shahr County, Mazandaran province, Iran.

== Demographics ==
=== Population ===
At the time of the 2006 National Census, the village's population was 354 in 103 households. The following census in 2011 counted 367 people in 116 households. The 2016 census measured the population of the village as 367 people in 119 households.
