= Div Kola-ye Olya =

Div Kola-ye Olya ديوكلاعليا
- Village
- Location within Iran
- Coordinates: 36°30′02″N 52°49′51″E
- Country: Iran
- Province: Mazandaran
- County: Qaem Shahr
- Bakhsh: Central
- Rural District: Nowkand Kola

Population (2006)
  - Total: 484
- Time zone: UTC+3:30 (IRST)
  - Summer (DST): UTC+4:30 (IRDT)

Div Kola-ye Olya (Persian: ديوكلاعليا, also Romanized as Dīv Kolā-ye ‘Olyā; also known as Dīv Kalāy and Dīv Kolā-ye Bālā) is a village in Nowkand Kola Rural District, in the Central District of Qaem Shahr County, Mazandaran Province, Iran. At the 2006 census, its population was 484, in 130 families.
