= Alamshir =

Village in Mazandaran province, Iran

Alamshir Persian: المشير
- Village
- Location within Iran
- Coordinates: 36°31′39″N 52°55′47″E
- Country: Iran
- Province: Mazandaran
- County: Qaem Shahr
- District: Central
- Rural District: Nowkand Kola

Population (2016)
  - Total: 2,711
- Time zone: UTC+3:30 (IRST)

Alamshir (Persian: المشير) (Note: Also romanized as Alamshīr) is a village in Nowkand Kola Rural District of the Central District in Qaem Shahr County, Mazandaran province, Iran.

== Demographics ==
=== Population ===
At the time of the 2006 National Census, the village's population was 2,957 in 782 households. The following census in 2011 counted 2,894 people in 907 households. The 2016 census measured the population of the village as 2,711 people in 948 households.
