= Afra Koti, Qaem Shahr =

Afra Koti افراكتي
- Village
- Location within Iran
- Coordinates: 36°29′23″N 52°48′30″E
- Country: Iran
- Province: Mazandaran
- County: Qaem Shahr
- Bakhsh: Central
- Rural District: Balatajan

Population (2006)
  - Total: 114
- Time zone: UTC+3:30 (IRST)
  - Summer (DST): UTC+4:30 (IRDT)

Afra Koti (Persian: افراكتي, also Romanized as Afrā Kotī) is a village in Balatajan Rural District, in the Central District of Qaem Shahr County, Mazandaran Province, Iran. At the 2006 census, its population was 114, in 32 families.
