= Sheykh Koli =

Village in Mazandaran province, Iran

Sheykh Koli Persian: شيخ كلي
- Village
- Location within Iran
- Coordinates: 36°25′48″N 52°47′33″E
- Country: Iran
- Province: Mazandaran
- County: Qaem Shahr
- District: Central
- Rural District: Balatajan

Population (2016)
  - Total: 1,072
- Time zone: UTC+3:30 (IRST)
- Website: qarakheyl.ir

Sheykh Koli (Persian: شيخ كلي) (Note: Also romanized as Sheykh Kolī; also known as Sheykh Kolá) is a village in, and the capital of, Balatajan Rural District in the Central District of Qaem Shahr County, Mazandaran province, Iran.

== Demographics ==
=== Population ===
At the time of the 2006 National Census, the village's population was 1,065 in 261 households. The following census in 2011 counted 1,157 people in 334 households. The 2016 census measured the population of the village as 1,072 people in 339 households.
