= Rekabdar Kola =

Village in Mazandaran province, Iran

Rekabdar Kola Persian: ركابداركلا
- Village
- Location within Iran
- Coordinates: 36°31′49″N 52°54′03″E
- Country: Iran
- Province: Mazandaran
- County: Qaem Shahr
- District: Central
- Rural District: Nowkand Kola

Population (2016)
  - Total: 946
- Time zone: UTC+3:30 (IRST)

Rekabdar Kola (Persian: ركابداركلا) (Note: Also romanized as Rekābdār Kalā and Rekābdār Kolā; also known as Seh Shanbeh Bāzār) is a village in, and the capital of, Nowkand Kola Rural District in the Central District of Qaem Shahr County, Mazandaran province, Iran.

== Demographics ==
=== Population ===
At the time of the 2006 National Census, the village's population was 619 in 178 households. The following census in 2011 counted 626 people in 195 households. The 2016 census measured the population of the village as 946 people in 322 households.
