= Saru Kola =

Village in Mazandaran province, Iran

Saru Kola Persian: ساروكلا
- Village
- Location within Iran
- Coordinates: 36°27′33″N 52°53′27″E
- Country: Iran
- Province: Mazandaran
- County: Qaem Shahr
- District: Central
- Rural District: Kuhsaran

Population (2016)
  - Total: 2,402
- Time zone: UTC+3:30 (IRST)

Saru Kola (Persian: ساروكلا) (Note: Also romanized as Sārū Kolā) is a village in Kuhsaran Rural District of the Central District in Qaem Shahr County, Mazandaran province, Iran.

== Demographics ==
=== Population ===
At the time of the 2006 National Census, the village's population was 2,470 in 709 households. The following census in 2011 counted 2,693 people in 815 households. The 2016 census measured the population of the village as 2,402 people in 823 households, the most populous in its rural district.
