= Gol Afshan, Mazandaran =

Gol Afshan گل افشان
- Village
- Location within Iran
- Coordinates: 36°25′31″N 52°56′38″E
- Country: Iran
- Province: Mazandaran
- County: Qaem Shahr
- Bakhsh: Central
- Rural District: Aliabad
- Elevation: 117 m (384 ft)

Population (2016)
  - Total: 253
- Time zone: UTC+3:30 (IRST)

Gol Afshan (Persian: گل افشان, also Romanized as Gol Afshān) is a village in Aliabad Rural District, in the Central District of Qaem Shahr County, Mazandaran Province, Iran.

At the time of the 2006 National Census, the village's population was 302 in 93 households. The following census in 2011 counted 262 people in 99 households. The 2016 census measured the population of the village as 253 people in 102 households.
