= Shahrud Kola =

Shahrud Kola شهرودكلا
- Village
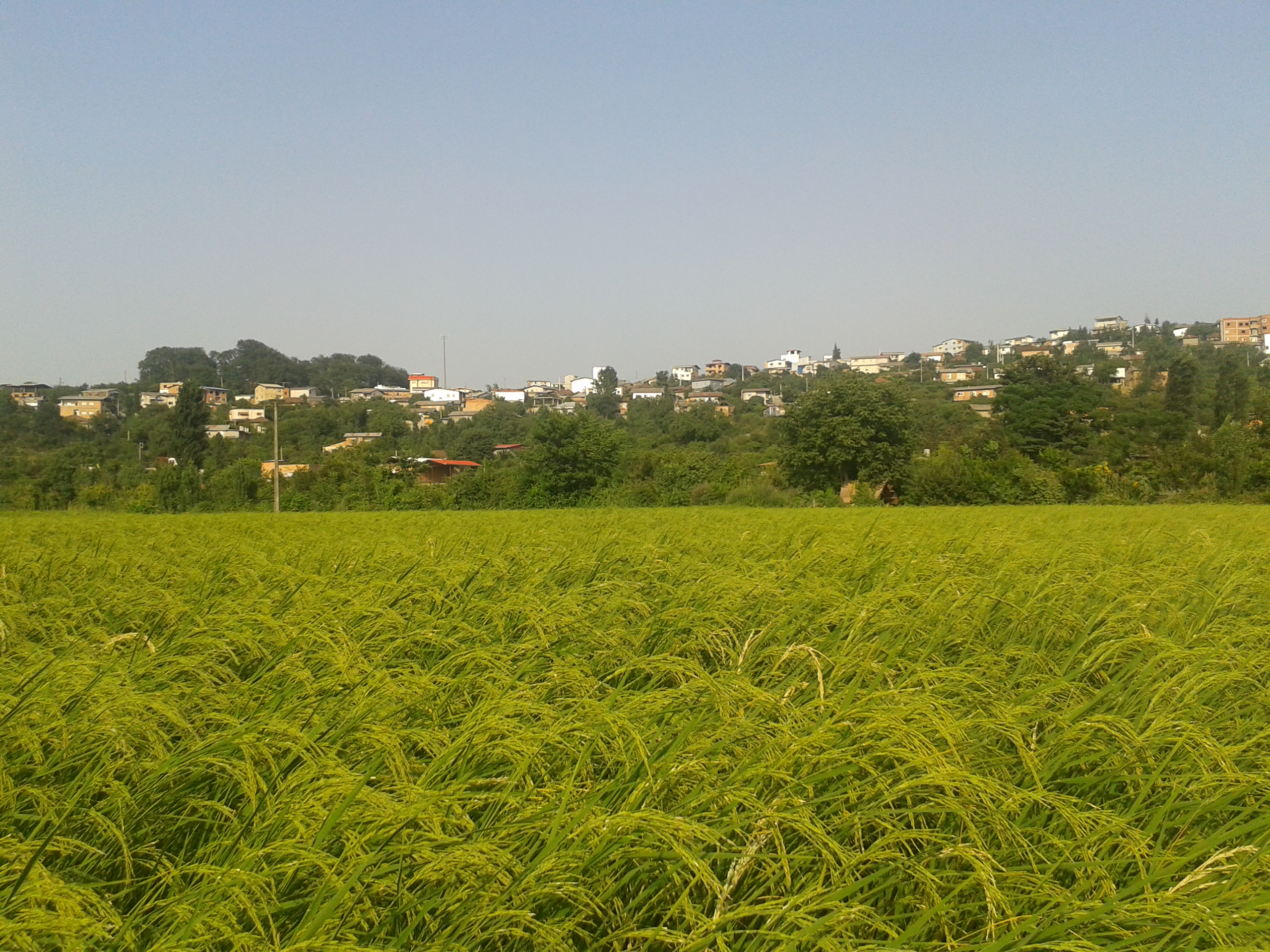

- Location within Iran
- Coordinates: 36°24′28″N 52°51′29″E
- Country: Iran
- Province: Mazandaran
- County: Qaem Shahr
- Bakhsh: Central
- Rural District: Aliabad
- Elevation: 160 m (520 ft)

Population (2016)
  - Total: 945
- Time zone: UTC+3:30 (IRST)

Shahrud Kola (Persian: شهرودكلا, also Romanized as Shahrūd Kolā) is a village in Aliabad Rural District, in the Central District of Qaem Shahr County, Mazandaran Province, Iran.

At the time of the 2006 National Census, the village's population was 959 in 248 households. The following census in 2011 counted 1,006 people in 306 households. The 2016 census measured the population of the village as 945 people in 339 households.
