= Parchi Kola, Qaem Shahr =

Village in Mazandaran province, Iran

Parchi Kola Persian: پرچيكلا
- Village
- Location within Iran
- Coordinates: 36°29′51″N 52°53′19″E
- Country: Iran
- Province: Mazandaran
- County: Qaem Shahr
- District: Central
- Rural District: Nowkand Kola

Population (2016)
  - Total: 1,746
- Time zone: UTC+3:30 (IRST)

Parchi Kola (Persian: پرچيكلا) (Note: Also romanized as Parchī Kolā) is a village in Nowkand Kola Rural District of the Central District in Qaem Shahr County, Mazandaran province, Iran.

== Demographics ==
=== Population ===
At the time of the 2006 National Census, the village's population was 1,546 in 403 households. The following census in 2011 counted 1,658 people in 485 households. The 2016 census measured the population of the village as 1,746 people in 572 households.
