= Div Kola-ye Sofla =

Village in Mazandaran province, Iran

Div Kola-ye Sofla Persian: ديوكلاسفلي
- Village
- Location within Iran
- Coordinates: 36°30′22″N 52°48′54″E
- Country: Iran
- Province: Mazandaran
- County: Qaem Shahr
- District: Central
- Rural District: Nowkand Kola

Population (2016)
  - Total: 1,136
- Time zone: UTC+3:30 (IRST)

Div Kola-ye Sofla (Persian: ديوكلاسفلي) (Note: Also romanized as Dīv Kalā-ye Soflá and Dīv Kolā-ye Soflá; also known as Dīv Kalā-ye Pā’īn, Dīv Kolā Pā’īn, and Gurakhair) is a village in Nowkand Kola Rural District of the Central District in Qaem Shahr County, Mazandaran province, Iran.

== Demographics ==
=== Population ===
At the time of the 2006 National Census, the village's population was 1,087 in 303 households. The following census in 2011 counted 1,204 people in 379 households. The 2016 census measured the population of the village as 1,136 people in 405 households.
