= Pain Lamuk =

Village in Mazandaran province, Iran

Pain Lamuk Persian: پايين لموك
- Village
- Location within Iran
- Coordinates: 36°29′46″N 52°55′08″E
- Country: Iran
- Province: Mazandaran
- County: Qaem Shahr
- District: Central
- Rural District: Bisheh Sar

Population (2016)
  - Total: 507
- Time zone: UTC+3:30 (IRST)

Pain Lamuk (Persian: پايين لموك) (Note: Also romanized as Pā’īn Lamūk) is a village in Bisheh Sar Rural District of the Central District in Qaem Shahr County, Mazandaran province, Iran.

== Demographics ==
=== Population ===
At the time of the 2006 National Census, the village's population was 529 in 147 households. The following census in 2011 counted 594 people in 196 households. The 2016 census measured the population of the village as 507 people in 178 households.
