= Kutna, Iran =

Village in Mazandaran province, Iran

Kutna Persian: كوتنا
- Village
- Location within Iran
- Coordinates: 36°26′53″N 52°55′02″E
- Country: Iran
- Province: Mazandaran
- County: Qaem Shahr
- District: Central
- Rural District: Kuhsaran

Population (2016)
  - Total: 1,132
- Time zone: UTC+3:30 (IRST)

Kutna (Persian: كوتنا) (Note: Also romanized as Kūtnā and Kūtenā; also known as Gotnā) is a village in, and the capital of, Kuhsaran Rural District in the Central District of Qaem Shahr County, Mazandaran province, Iran.

== Demographics ==
=== Population ===
At the time of the 2006 National Census, the village's population was 1,221 in 336 households. The following census in 2011 counted 1,272 people in 364 households. The 2016 census measured the population of the village as 1,132 people in 360 households.
