= Pain Afrakoti =

Village in Mazandaran province, Iran

Pain Afrakoti Persian: پايين افراكتي
- Village
- Location within Iran
- Coordinates: 36°28′52″N 52°55′07″E
- Country: Iran
- Province: Mazandaran
- County: Qaem Shahr
- District: Central
- Rural District: Bisheh Sar

Population (2016)
  - Total: 607
- Time zone: UTC+3:30 (IRST)

Pain Afrakoti (Persian: پايين افراكتي) (Note: Also romanized as Pā’īn Afrā Kotī and Pā’īn Afrākotī; also known as Afrā Kotī) is a village in Bisheh Sar Rural District of the Central District in Qaem Shahr County, Mazandaran province, Iran.

== Demographics ==
=== Population ===
At the time of the 2006 National Census, the village's population was 592 in 168 households. The following census in 2011 counted 703 people in 223 households. The 2016 census measured the population of the village as 607 people in 207 households.
