= Parchi Kola =

Parchi Kola (Persian: پرچيكلا) may refer to:

- Parchi Kola, Qaem Shahr
- Parchi Kola, Sari
