= Laharem Taluk =

Village in Mazandaran province, Iran

Laharem Taluk Persian: لهرم تلوك
- Village
- Location within Iran
- Coordinates: 36°27′52″N 52°55′12″E
- Country: Iran
- Province: Mazandaran
- County: Qaem Shahr
- District: Central
- Rural District: Bisheh Sar

Population (2016)
  - Total: 666
- Time zone: UTC+3:30 (IRST)

Laharem Taluk (Persian: لهرم تلوك) (Note: Also romanized as Lahārem Talūk and Lahārom Talūk) is a village in Bisheh Sar Rural District of the Central District in Qaem Shahr County, Mazandaran province, Iran.

== Demographics ==
=== Population ===
At the time of the 2006 National Census, the village's population was 837 in 218 households. The following census in 2011 counted 820 people in 249 households. The 2016 census measured the population of the village as 666 people in 216 households.
