= Abmal, Qaem Shahr =

Abmal آبمال
- Village
- Location within Iran
- Coordinates: 36°27′00″N 52°53′00″E
- Country: Iran
- Province: Mazandaran
- County: Qaem Shahr
- Bakhsh: Central
- Rural District: Aliabad

Population (2016)
  - Total: 466
- Time zone: UTC+3:30 (IRST)

Abmal (Persian: آبمال, also Romanized as Ābmāl) is a village in Aliabad Rural District, in the Central District of Qaem Shahr County, Mazandaran Province, Iran.

At the time of the 2006 National Census, the village's population was 396 in 106 households. The following census in 2011 counted 481 people in 143 households. The 2016 census measured the population of the village as 466 people in 165 households.
