= Afra Takht, Qaem Shahr =

Village in Mazandaran province, Iran

Afra Takht Persian: افراتخت
- Village
- Location within Iran
- Coordinates: 36°28′38″N 52°58′43″E
- Country: Iran
- Province: Mazandaran
- County: Qaem Shahr
- District: Central
- Rural District: Bisheh Sar

Population (2016)
  - Total: 817
- Time zone: UTC+3:30 (IRST)

Afra Takht (Persian: افراتخت) (Note: Also romanized as Afrā Takht; also known as Afrā Takhī) is a village in Bisheh Sar Rural District of the Central District in Qaem Shahr County, Mazandaran province, Iran.

== Demographics ==
=== Population ===
At the time of the 2006 National Census, the village's population was 789 in 190 households. The following census in 2011 counted 756 people in 215 households. The 2016 census measured the population of the village as 817 people in 258 households.
