= Mian Rud, Qaem Shahr =

Village in Mazandaran province, Iran

Mian Rud Persian: ميانرود
- Village
- Location within Iran
- Coordinates: 36°26′42″N 52°53′50″E
- Country: Iran
- Province: Mazandaran
- County: Qaem Shahr
- District: Central
- Rural District: Kuhsaran

Population (2016)
  - Total: 181
- Time zone: UTC+3:30 (IRST)

Mian Rud (Persian: ميانرود) (Note: Also romanized as Mīān Rūd) is a village in Kuhsaran Rural District of the Central District in Qaem Shahr County, Mazandaran province, Iran.

== Demographics ==
=== Population ===
At the time of the 2006 National Census, the village's population was 182 in 58 households. The following census in 2011 counted 187 people in 59 households. The 2016 census measured the population of the village as 181 people in 65 households.
