= Talar Posht-e Olya =

Talar Posht-e Olya تالارپشت عليا
- Village
- Location within Iran
- Coordinates: 36°24′29″N 52°50′39″E
- Country: Iran
- Province: Mazandaran
- County: Qaem Shahr
- Bakhsh: Central
- Rural District: Aliabad
- Elevation: 106 m (348 ft)

Population (2016)
  - Total: 787
- Time zone: UTC+3:30 (IRST)

Talar Posht-e Olya (Persian: تالارپشت عليا, also Romanized as Tālār Posht-e ‘Olyā; also known as Bālā Tālār Posht) is a village in Aliabad Rural District, in the Central District of Qaem Shahr County, Mazandaran Province, Iran.

At the time of the 2006 National Census, the village's population was 769 in 206 households. The following census in 2011 counted 795 people in 240 households. The 2016 census measured the population of the village as 787 people in 263 households.
