= Kutna =

Kutna may refer to:

- Kutna, India
- Kutna, Iran
