= Afratakht =

Afratakht or Afra Takht (Persian: افراتخت) may refer to:

- Afratakht, Babolsar
- Afratakht, Mahmudabad
- Afra Takht, Qaem Shahr
