= Kashka =

Kashka may refer to:

- Kaskians, an ancient people of Anatolia
- Kashka, Armenia
- Kashka, Iran
