= Khatir Kola =

Village in Mazandaran province, Iran

Khatir Kola Persian: خطيركلا
- Village
- Location within Iran
- Coordinates: 36°26′17″N 52°45′19″E
- Country: Iran
- Province: Mazandaran
- County: Qaem Shahr
- District: Central
- Rural District: Balatajan

Population (2016)
  - Total: 3,701
- Time zone: UTC+3:30 (IRST)

Khatir Kola (Persian: خطيركلا) (Note: Also romanized as Khaţīr Kalā and Khaţīr Kolā) is a village in Balatajan Rural District of the Central District in Qaem Shahr County, Mazandaran province, Iran.

== Demographics ==
=== Population ===
At the time of the 2006 National Census, the village's population was 3,500 in 930 households. The following census in 2011 counted 3,544 people in 1,093 households. The 2016 census measured the population of the village as 3,701 people in 1,200 households.
