= Kuhsaran =

Kuhsaran (Persian: کوهساران) may refer to:

- Kuhsaran District, in Kerman Province
- Kuhsaran Rural District, in Mazandaran Province
