= Bala Lamuk =

Village in Mazandaran province, Iran

Bala Lamuk Persian: بالالموك
- Village
- Location within Iran
- Coordinates: 36°29′46″N 52°53′55″E
- Country: Iran
- Province: Mazandaran
- County: Qaem Shahr
- District: Central
- Rural District: Nowkand Kola

Population (2016)
  - Total: 2,301
- Time zone: UTC+3:30 (IRST)

Bala Lamuk (Persian: بالالموك) (Note: Also romanized as Bālā Lamūk; also known as Lamūk) is a village in Nowkand Kola Rural District of the Central District in Qaem Shahr County, Mazandaran province, Iran.

== Demographics ==
=== Population ===
At the time of the 2006 National Census, the village's population was 2,080 in 559 households. The following census in 2011 counted 2,348 people in 692 households. The 2016 census measured the population of the village as 2,301 people in 751 households.
