= Aliabad Rural District (Qaem Shahr County) =

Rural district in Mazandaran province, Iran

Aliabad Rural District Persian: دهستان علی‌آباد
- Rural District
- Location within Iran
- Coordinates: 36°25′N 52°55′E
- Country: Iran
- Province: Mazandaran
- County: Qaem Shahr
- District: Central
- Established: 1987
- Capital: Qadi Kola-ye Bozorg

Population (2016)
  - Total: 25,004
- Time zone: UTC+3:30 (IRST)

Aliabad Rural District (Persian: دهستان علی‌آباد) is in the Central District of Qaem Shahr County, Mazandaran province, Iran. Its capital is the village of Qadi Kola-ye Bozorg.

== Demographics ==
=== Population ===
At the time of the 2006 National Census, the rural district's population was 24,184 in 6,455 households. There were 26,015 inhabitants in 7,832 households at the following census of 2011. The 2016 census measured the population of the rural district as 25,004 in 8,317 households. The most populous of its 18 villages was Shahrak-e Yasrab, with 4,055 people.

=== Other villages in the rural district ===
- Abmal
- Ahangar Kola
- Chaleh Zamin
- Chepi
- Denj Kola
- Eskandar Kola
- Fulad Kola
- Gol Afshan
- Macheh Bon
- Malek Kola
- Matan Kola
- Qadi Kola-ye Bozorg
- Shahrak-e Yasrab
- Shahrud Kola
- Talar Posht-e Olya
- Talar Posht-e Sofla
- Vaskas
- Vosta Kola
