= Qadi Kola-ye Bozorg =

Village in Mazandaran province, Iran

Qadi Kola-ye Bozorg Persian: قاديكل ابزرگ
- Village
- Location within Iran
- Coordinates: 36°25′44″N 52°54′15″E
- Country: Iran
- Province: Mazandaran
- County: Qaem Shahr
- District: Central
- Rural District: Aliabad

Population (2016)
  - Total: 2,483
- Time zone: UTC+3:30 (IRST)

Qadi Kola-ye Bozorg (Persian: قاديكلابزرگ) (Note: Also romanized as Qādī Kolā-ye Bozorg; also known as Fādī Kolā-ye Bozorg and Qādī Kalā) is a village in, and the capital of, Aliabad Rural District in the Central District of Qaem Shahr County, Mazandaran province, Iran.

== Demographics ==
=== Population ===
At the time of the 2006 National Census, the village's population was 2,638 in 787 households. The following census in 2011 counted 2,639 people in 828 households. The 2016 census measured the population of the village as 2,483 people in 845 households.
