= Matan Kola =

Village in Mazandaran province, Iran

Matan Kola Persian: متان كلا
- Village
- Location within Iran
- Coordinates: 36°25′06″N 52°50′56″E
- Country: Iran
- Province: Mazandaran
- County: Qaem Shahr
- District: Central
- Rural District: Aliabad

Population (2016)
  - Total: 2,898
- Time zone: UTC+3:30 (IRST)

Matan Kola (Persian: متان كلا) (Note: Also romanized as Matān Kolā) is a village in Aliabad Rural District of the Central District in Qaem Shahr County, Mazandaran province, Iran.

== Demographics ==
=== Population ===
At the time of the 2006 National Census, the village's population was 2,381 in 627 households. The following census in 2011 counted 2,863 people in 832 households. The 2016 census measured the population of the village as 2,898 people in 935 households.
