= Qasem Khel =

- Village
- Location in Afghanistan
- Coordinates: 33°57′18″N 69°26′10″E
- Country: Afghanistan
- Province: Logar Province
- Time zone: + 4.30

Qasem Khel or Qasem Kheyl (Pashto: قاسم خېل) is a village in Logar Province, in eastern Afghanistan. It lies about 50 kilometres northeast of Gardez and 80 kilometres southeast of Kabul.

Fossiliferous Permian sequences have been described at Qasim Khel, Ali Khel and Jalalabad and Altimur (Altamur) by Kaever (1965, 1967) and Weippert et al. (1970).
