= Outhman Khatir =

Chadian footballer (born 1991)

Personal information
- Date of birth: 27 June 1991 (age 35)
- Place of birth: N'Djamena, Chad
- Height: 1.73 m (5 ft 8 in)
- Position: Right-back

International career
Years	Team	Apps	(Gls)
2007–2010	Chad	2	(0)

Outhman Khatir (born 27 June 1991) is a Chadian professional footballer who plays as a right-back. He has made two appearances for the Chad national team.
