= Kuhsaran Rural District =

Rural district in Mazandaran province, Iran

Kuhsaran Rural District Persian: دهستان كوهساران
- Rural District
- Location within Iran
- Coordinates: 36°27′N 52°58′E
- Country: Iran
- Province: Mazandaran
- County: Qaem Shahr
- District: Central
- Established: 2002
- Capital: Kutna

Population (2016)
  - Total: 4,907
- Time zone: UTC+3:30 (IRST)

Kuhsaran Rural District (Persian: دهستان كوهساران) is in the Central District of Qaem Shahr County, Mazandaran province, Iran. Its capital is the village of Kutna.

== Demographics ==
=== Population ===
At the time of the 2006 National Census, the rural district's population was 5,486 in 1,625 households. There were 5,417 inhabitants in 1,681 households at the following census of 2011. The 2016 census measured the population of the rural district as 4,907 in 1,724 households. The most populous of its eight villages was Saru Kola, with 2,402 people.

=== Other villages in the rural district ===
- Kar Chang
- Mian Rud
- Par Chinak
- Reykandeh
- Seyf Koti
- Seyyed Abu Saleh
