= Har Do Rud, Nur =

Har Do Rud هردورود
- Village
- Location within Iran
- Coordinates: 36°31′11″N 52°03′27″E
- Country: Iran
- Province: Mazandaran
- County: Nur
- Bakhsh: Central
- Rural District: Natel Kenar-e Olya

Population (2006)
  - Total: 276
- Time zone: UTC+3:30 (IRST)
  - Summer (DST): UTC+4:30 (IRDT)

Har Do Rud (Persian: هردورود, also Romanized as Har Do Rūd) is a village in Natel Kenar-e Olya Rural District, in the Central District of Nur County, Mazandaran Province, Iran. At the 2006 census, its population was 276, in 65 families.
