= Fulad Kola, Nur =

Fulad Kola فولادكلا
- Village
- Location within Iran
- Coordinates: 36°25′02″N 52°15′00″E
- Country: Iran
- Province: Mazandaran
- County: Nur
- Bakhsh: Chamestan
- Rural District: Mianrud

Population (2006)
  - Total: 277
- Time zone: UTC+3:30 (IRST)
  - Summer (DST): UTC+4:30 (IRDT)

Fulad Kola (Persian: فولادكلا, also Romanized as Fūlād Kolā; also known as Pūlād Kolā) is a village in Mianrud Rural District, Chamestan District, Nur County, Mazandaran Province, Iran. At the 2006 census, its population was 277, in 75 families.
