= Choft Sar, Babol =

Choft Sar چفت سر
- Village
- Location within Iran
- Coordinates: 36°40′20″N 52°50′30″E
- Country: Iran
- Province: Mazandaran
- County: Babol
- Bakhsh: Bandpey-ye Sharqi
- Rural District: Sajjadrud

Population (2006)
  - Total: 355
- Time zone: UTC+3:30 (IRST)
  - Summer (DST): UTC+4:30 (IRDT)

Choft Sar (Persian: چفت سر) is a village in Sajjadrud Rural District, Bandpey-ye Sharqi District, Babol County, Mazandaran Province, Iran. At the 2006 census, its population was 355, in 85 families.
