= Aap Ki Khatir =

Aap Ki Khatir (lit. 'for your sake') may refer to:

- Aap Ki Khatir (1977 film), an Indian Hindi-language romance film by Sudhendu Roy, starring Vinod Khanna and Rekha
- Aap Ki Khatir (1980 film), a Pakistani film directed by Zeenat
- Aap Ki Khatir (2006 film), an Indian Hindi-language romance film by Dharmesh Darshan, starring Akshaye Khanna and Priyanka Chopra Jonas
