= Cheft Sar, Sari =

Cheft Sar چفت سر
- Village
- Location within Iran
- Coordinates: 36°42′32″N 53°04′25″E
- Country: Iran
- Province: Mazandaran
- County: Sari
- Bakhsh: Rudpey
- Rural District: East Rudpey

Population (2006)
  - Total: 149
- Time zone: UTC+3:30 (IRST)

Cheft Sar (Persian: چفت سر; also known as Chefteh Sar) is a village in Sari County, Mazandaran Province, Iran. At the 2006 census, its population was 149, in 37 families.

It was formerly Rudpey-ye Jonubi Rural District, in the Central District of the county. Its location was changed Rudpey-ye Sharqi Rural District of Rudpey District.
