= Hajji Kola, Lafur =

Hajji Kola حاجيكلا
- village
- Location within Iran
- Coordinates: 36°11′00″N 52°47′00″E
- Country: Iran
- Province: Mazandaran
- County: North Savadkuh
- Rural District: Lafur

Population (2006)
  - Total: 18
- Time zone: UTC+3:30 (IRST)

Hajji Kola (Persian: حاجيكلا, also Romanized as Ḩājjī Kolā) is a village in Lafur Rural District, North Savadkuh County, Mazandaran Province, Iran. At the 2006 census, its population was 18, in 10 families. At the 2016 census, the village's population was not recorded since it had less than 4 households.
