= Afra Koti-ye Mir Ali Tabar =

Afra Koti-ye Mir Ali Tabar افراكتي مير علي تبار
- Village
- Country: Iran
- Province: Mazandaran
- County: Babol
- Bakhsh: Bandpey-ye Sharqi
- Rural District: Sajjadrud

Population (2006)
  - Total: 21
- Time zone: UTC+3:30 (IRST)
  - Summer (DST): UTC+4:30 (IRDT)

Afra Koti-ye Mir Ali Tabar (Persian: افراكتي مير علي تبار, also Romanized as Āfrā Kotī-ye Mīr ʿAlī Tabār) is a village in Sajjadrud Rural District, Bandpey-ye Sharqi District, Babol County, Mazandaran Province, Iran. At the 2006 census, its population was 21, in 7 families.
