= Arateh =

City in Mazandaran province, Iran

Arateh Persian: ارطه
- City
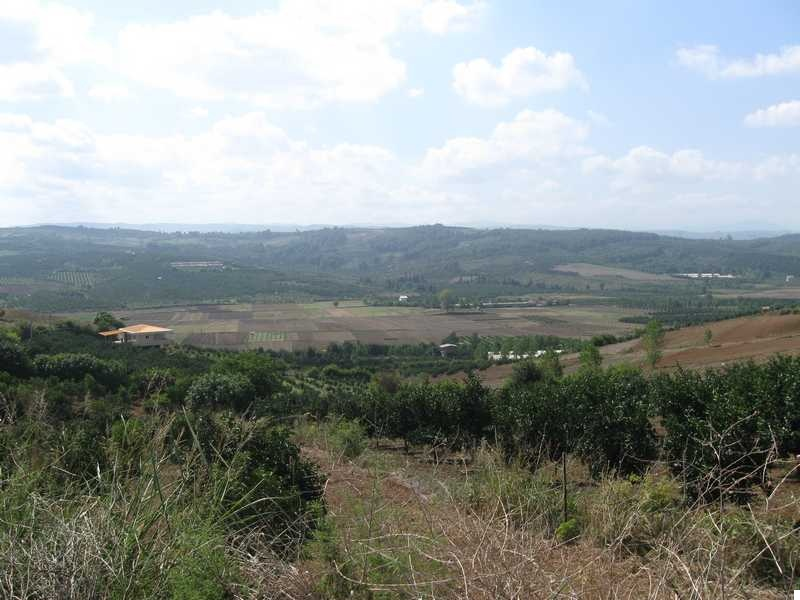
- Landscape near Arateh

- Location within Iran
- Coordinates: 36°29′30″N 52°57′11″E
- Country: Iran
- Province: Mazandaran
- County: Qaem Shahr
- District: Central
- Established as a city: 2010

Population (2016)
  - Total: 10,327
- Time zone: UTC+3:30 (IRST)

Arateh (Persian: ارطه) (Note: Formerly Qadi Kola-ye Arateh (قاديكلاارطه), also romanized as Qādī Kolā-ye Araţeh; also known as Qārī Kolā-ye Araţeh) is a city in the Central District of Qaem Shahr County, Mazandaran province, Iran, serving as the administrative center for Bisheh Sar Rural District.

== Demographics ==
=== Population ===
At the time of the 2006 National Census, the population (as the village of Qadi Kola-ye Arateh) was 2,172 in 587 households, when it was in Bisheh Sar Rural District. The following census in 2011 counted 2,040 people in 632 households. The 2016 census measured the population of the city as 10,327 people in 3,301 households, by which time the village had merged with Abu Kheyl-e Arateh, Bur Kheyl-e Arateh, Juja Deh-e Arateh, Kafshgar Kola-ye Arateh, and Qasem Kheyl-e Arateh to become the city of Arateh.
