= Bisheh Sar Rural District =

Rural district in Mazandaran province, Iran

Bisheh Sar Rural District Persian: دهستان بيشه سر
- Rural District
- Location within Iran
- Coordinates: 36°29′N 52°57′E
- Country: Iran
- Province: Mazandaran
- County: Qaem Shahr
- District: Central
- Established: 1987
- Capital: Arateh

Population (2016)
  - Total: 4,401
- Time zone: UTC+3:30 (IRST)

Bisheh Sar Rural District (Persian: دهستان بيشه سر) is in the Central District of Qaem Shahr County, Mazandaran province, Iran. It is administered from the city of Arateh. (Note: Formerly Qadi Kola-ye Arateh)

== Demographics ==
=== Population ===
At the time of the 2006 National Census, the rural district's population was 14,058 in 3,658 households. There were 14,797 inhabitants in 4,429 households at the following census of 2011. The 2016 census measured the population of the rural district as 4,401 in 1,466 households. The most populous of its eight villages was Bala Afrakoti, with 841 people.

=== Other villages in the rural district ===
- Afra Takht
- Laharem Taluk
- Mehdiabad
- Pain Afrakoti
- Pain Lamuk
- Pasha Kola-ye Afrakoti
- Sheykh Rajeh
