= Nowkand Kola Rural District =

Rural district in Mazandaran province, Iran

Nowkand Kola Rural District Persian: دهستان نوكندكلا
- Rural District
- Location within Iran
- Coordinates: 36°32′N 52°53′E
- Country: Iran
- Province: Mazandaran
- County: Qaem Shahr
- District: Central
- Established: 1987
- Capital: Rekabdar Kola

Population (2016)
  - Total: 26,715
- Time zone: UTC+3:30 (IRST)

Nowkand Kola Rural District (Persian: دهستان نوكندكلا) is in the Central District of Qaem Shahr County, Mazandaran province, Iran. Its capital is the village of Rekabdar Kola.

== Demographics ==
=== Population ===
At the time of the 2006 National Census, the rural district's population was 25,941 in 6,870 households. There were 27,823 inhabitants in 8,069 households at the following census of 2011. The 2016 census measured the population of the rural district as 26,715 in 8,747 households. The most populous of its 31 villages was Chamaz Koti, with 5,436 people.

=== Other villages in the rural district ===
- Alamshir
- Bala Lamuk
- Div Kola-ye Sofla
- Hajjiabad
- Kelagar Mahalleh
- Parchi Kola
