= Balatajan Rural District =

Rural district in Mazandaran province, Iran

Balatajan Rural District Persian: دهستان بالاتجن
- Rural District
- Location within Iran
- Coordinates: 36°27′N 52°47′E
- Country: Iran
- Province: Mazandaran
- County: Qaem Shahr
- District: Central
- Established: 1987
- Capital: Sheykh Koli

Population (2016)
  - Total: 32,891
- Time zone: UTC+3:30 (IRST)

Balatajan Rural District (Persian: دهستان بالاتجن) is in the Central District of Qaem Shahr County, Mazandaran province, Iran. Its capital is the village of Sheykh Koli.

== Demographics ==
=== Population ===
At the time of the 2006 National Census, the rural district's population was 31,892 in 8,244 households. There were 32,315 inhabitants in 9,611 households at the following census of 2011. The 2016 census measured the population of the rural district as 32,891 in 10,987 households. The most populous of its 50 villages was Qara Kheyl, with 4,471 people.

=== Other villages in the rural district ===
- Bagh Dasht
- Bala Joneyd-e Lakpol
- Gavan Ahangar
- Khatir Kola
- Khorma Kola
- Meydan Sar
- Seraj Kola
