= Central District (Qaem Shahr County) =

District in Mazandaran province, Iran

Central District (Qaem Shahr County) Persian: بخش مرکزی شهرستان قائم‌شهر
- District
- Location within Iran
- Coordinates: 36°28′N 52°52′E
- Country: Iran
- Province: Mazandaran
- County: Qaem Shahr
- Capital: Qaem Shahr

Population (2016)
  - Total: 309,198
- Time zone: UTC+3:30 (IRST)

The Central District of Qaem Shahr County (Persian: بخش مرکزی شهرستان قائم‌شهر) is in Mazandaran province, Iran. Its capital is the city of Qaem Shahr.

== History ==
In 2010, the village of Qadi Kola-ye Arateh merged with four other villages to form the city of Arateh.

== Demographics ==
=== Population ===
At the time of the 2006 census, the district's population was 275,807 in 74,907 households. The following census in 2011 counted 302,417 people in 91,989 households. The 2016 census measured the population of the district as 309,198 inhabitants in 102,949 households.

=== Administrative divisions ===
Central District (Qaem Shahr County) Population
Administrative Divisions	2006	2011	2016
Aliabad RD	24,184	26,015	25,004
Balatajan RD	31,892	32,315	32,891
Bisheh Sar RD	14,058	14,797	4,401
Kuhsaran RD	5,486	5,417	4,907
Nowkand Kola RD	25,941	27,823	26,715
Arateh (city) (Note: Merger of several villages)			10,327
Qaem Shahr (city)	174,246	196,050	204,953
Total	275,807	302,417	309,198
RD = Rural District
