= Qaem Shahr County =

County in Mazandaran province, Iran

Qaem Shahr County Persian: شهرستان قائم‌شهر
- County
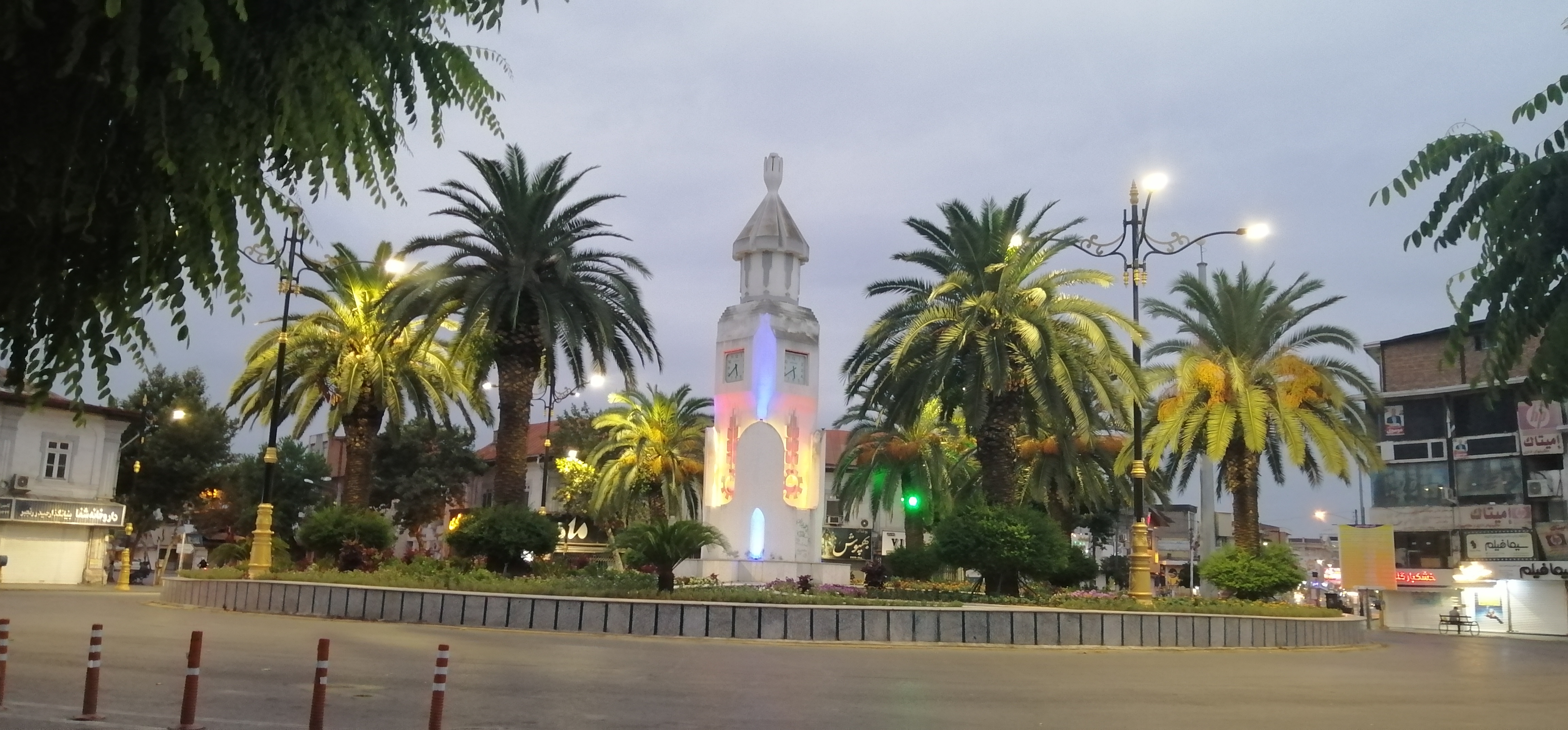
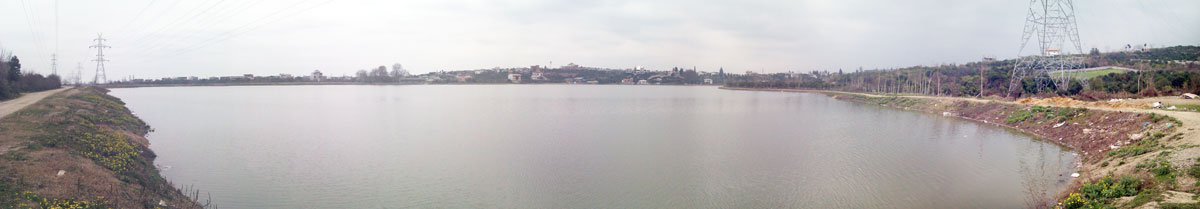
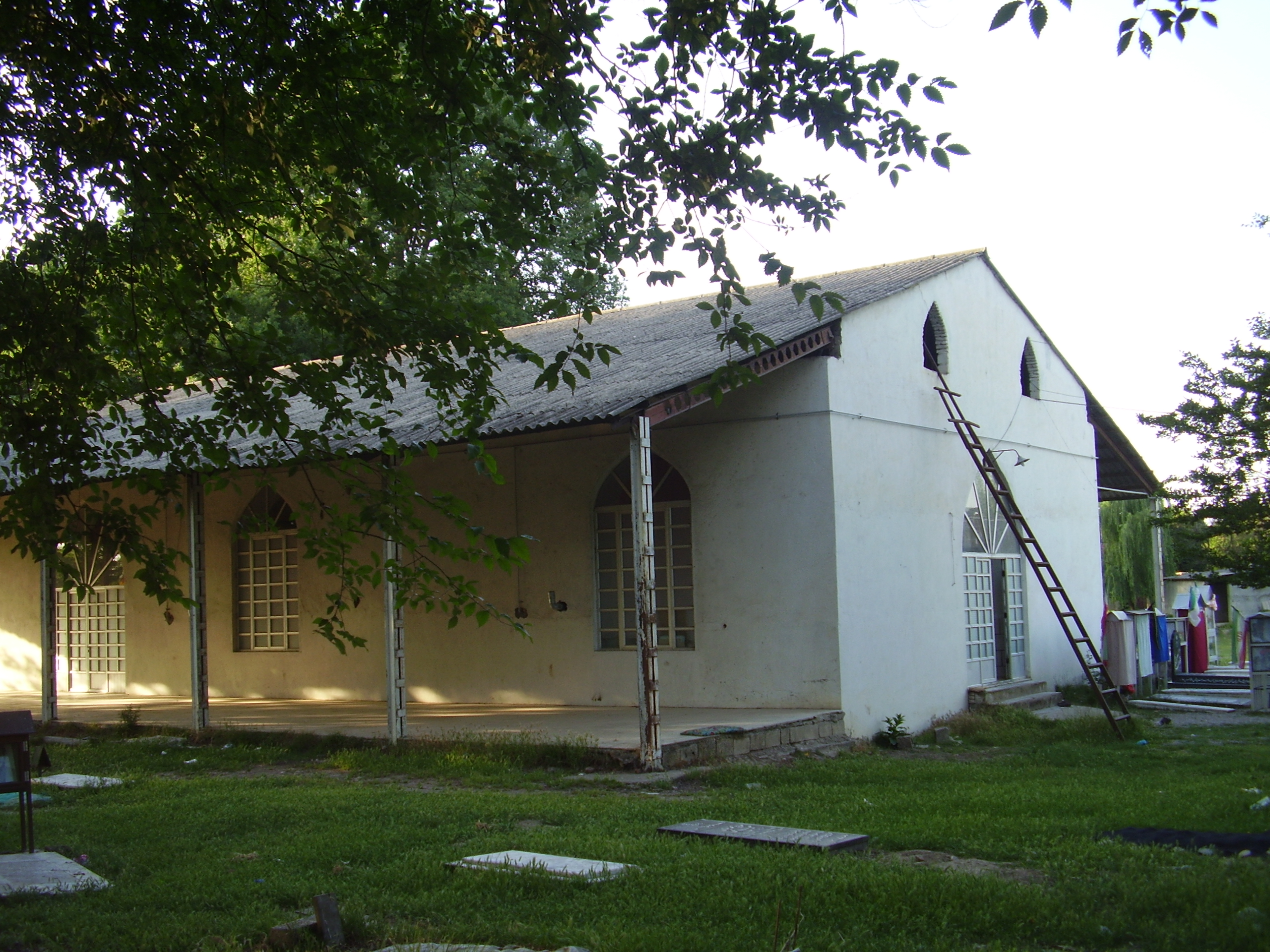
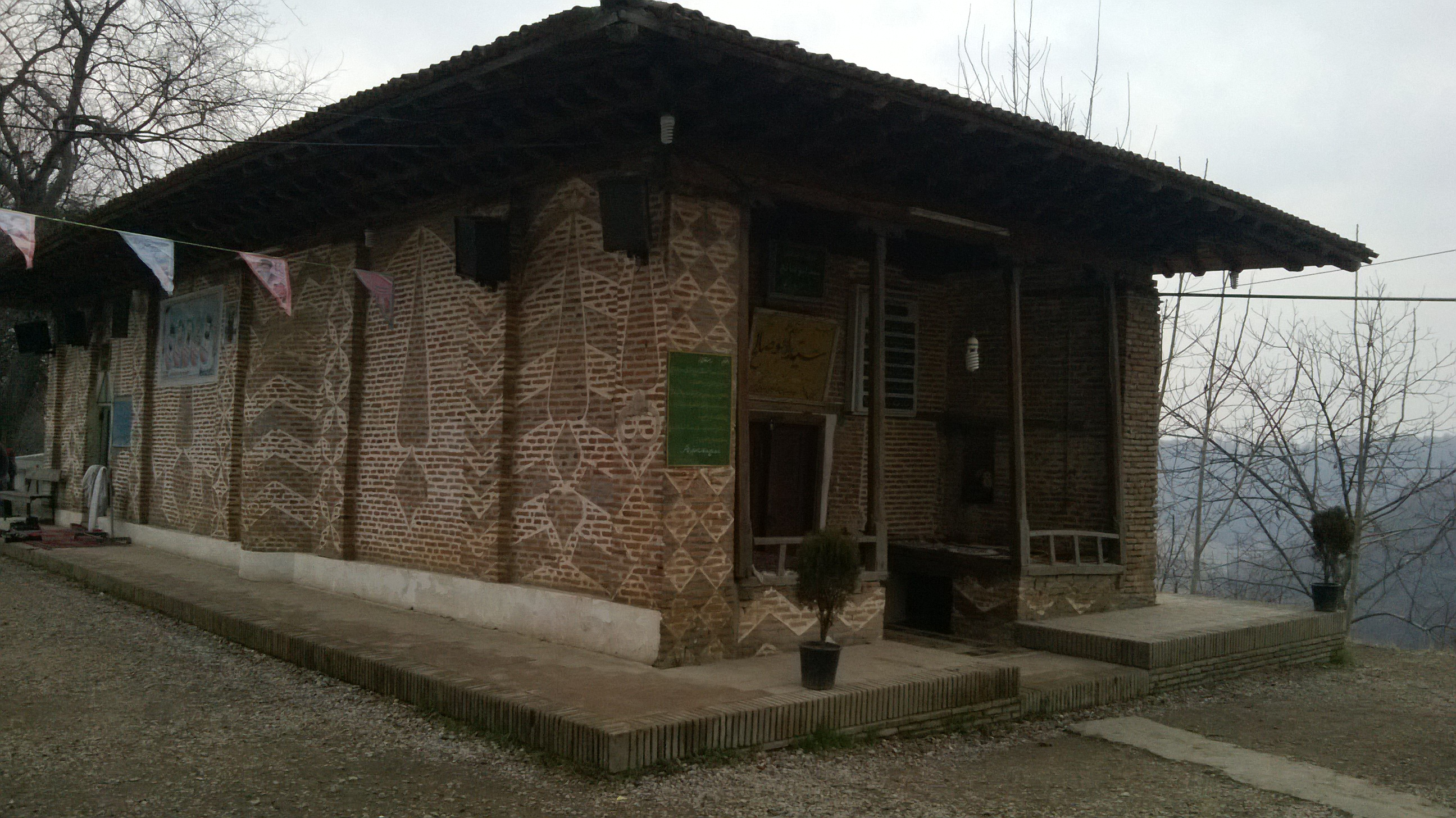
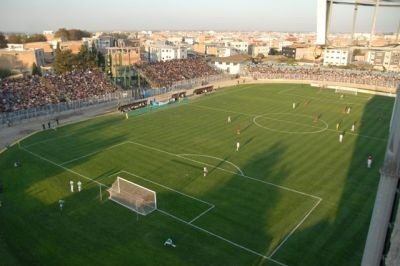
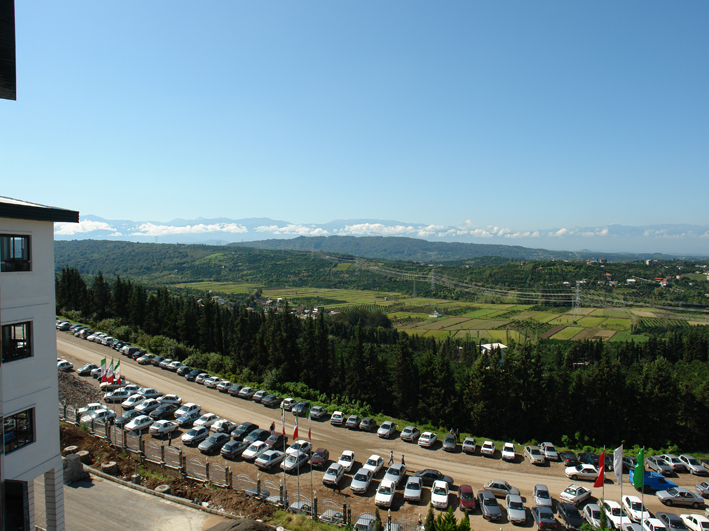

- Location of Qaem Shahr County in Mazandaran province (center right, green)

- Location of Mazandaran province in Iran
- Coordinates: 36°28′N 52°52′E
- Country: Iran
- Province: Mazandaran
- Capital: Qaem Shahr
- Districts: Central

Area
  - Total: 458.50 km^{2} (177.03 sq mi)

Population (2016)
  - Total: 309,199
  - Density: 674.37/km^{2} (1,746.6/sq mi)
- Time zone: UTC+3:30 (IRST)

Qaem Shahr County (Persian: شهرستان قائم‌شهر) (Note: Also romanized as Qa'em Shahr; also known as Ghaemshahr) is in Mazandaran province, Iran. Its capital is the city of Qaem Shahr.

== History ==
The city was previously known as Aliabad. With the Pahlavi dynasty, the city changed its name to Shahi in honor of Reza Shah, who was born in Alasht, a village close by. The county was renamed to Qaem Shahr after the 1979 revolution. Qaemshahr is located in the junction of the two major transit roads of Haraz and Firûzkûh, which connect Mazandaran to the capital of Iran, Tehran.

In 2010, the village of Qadi Kola-ye Arateh merged with four other villages to form the city of Arateh. In 2012, Kiakola District was separated from the county in the establishment of Simorgh County.

== Demographics ==
=== Population ===
At the time of the 2006 National Census, the county's population was 293,721 in 79,707 households. The following census in 2011 counted 320,741 people in 97,552 households. The 2016 census measured the population of the county as 309,199 in 102,950 households.

=== Administrative divisions ===
Qaem Shahr County's population history and administrative structure over three consecutive censuses are shown in the following table.

Qaem Shahr County Population
Administrative Divisions	2006	2011	2016
Central District	275,807	302,417	309,198
Aliabad RD	24,184	26,015	25,004
Balatajan RD	31,892	32,315	32,891
Bisheh Sar RD	14,058	14,797	4,401
Kuhsaran RD	5,486	5,417	4,907
Nowkand Kola RD	25,941	27,823	26,715
Arateh (city) (Note: Merger of several villages)			10,327
Qaem Shahr (city)	174,246	196,050	204,953
Kiakola District (Note: Transferred to Simorgh County)	17,914	18,324	
Kiakola RD	4,217	4,422	
Talarpey RD	6,333	6,211	
Kiakola (city)	7,364	7,691	
Total	293,721	320,741	309,199
RD = Rural District

== See also ==
Media related to Qaem Shahr County at Wikimedia Commons
