= Seed (disambiguation) =

A seed is an encased plant embryo.

Seed(s) or The Seed(s) may also refer to:

== Arts, entertainment, and media ==
=== Films ===
- Seed (1931 film), a film notable for an early appearance by Bette Davis
- Seed, a 1997 short film starring Rose McGowan
- The Seed (2006 film), short film by Joe Hahn
- Seed (2007 film), a Canadian horror film by Uwe Boll
- The Seed (2021 film), a British body horror film by Sam Walker
- Seed Productions, Hugh Jackman's film production company
- Seeds (2024 film)
- Seeds (2025 film)

=== Gaming ===
- Seed (2006 video game), a defunct MMORPG developed by Runestone Game Development
- Seed (upcoming video game), an upcoming MMO simulation game developed by Klang Games
- Map seed, a number or text string used to initialize a procedural map generator in a video game
- SeeDs, a fictional organization of elite mercenaries from the video game Final Fantasy VIII

=== Music ===
==== Groups and labels ====
- Seed Records, a record label
- The Seeds, a 1960s rock 'n' roll band
- The Bad Seeds (American band), American garage rock band active 1964–66
- Nick Cave and the Bad Seeds, Australian rock band formed in 1983

==== Albums ====
- Seed (Nick Harper album), 1995
- Seeds (Brother Cane album), 1995
- Seed (Afro Celt Sound System album), 2003
- Seed (Mami Kawada album), 2006
- Seeds (Hey Rosetta! album), 2011
- Seeds (Georgia Anne Muldrow album), 2012
- Seeds (TV on the Radio album), 2014

==== Songs ====
- "The Seed (2.0)", by The Roots and Cody Chesnutt
- "The Seed" (Aurora song)
- "Seed", by The Academy Is... from Santi
- "Seed", by Carbon Leaf from Nothing Rhymes with Woman
- "Seed", by Korn from Follow the Leader
- "Seed", by Mudvayne from The Beginning of All Things to End'
- "Seed", by Sublime from Sublime
- "Seeds", by Bon Jovi from Forever
- "Seeds", by Bruce Springsteen from Live/1975–85
- "The Seed", by Sasami from Blood on the Silver Screen

=== Periodicals and books ===
- Seed (magazine), a U.S. science magazine
- Seed (student newspaper), published at Victoria University, Melbourne, Australia
- Chicago Seed (newspaper), published in Chicago, Illinois, U.S., in the late 1960s
- The Seed (novel), a 1940 novel by Tarjei Vesaas

=== Television ===
==== Series ====
- Seed (TV series), a Canadian TV series
- Mobile Suit Gundam SEED, a Japanese anime series
- Mobile Suit Gundam SEED Destiny, a Japanese anime series

==== Episodes ====
- "Seed" (The Walking Dead), 2012 episode
- "Seeds" (Agents of S.H.I.E.L.D.), 2014 episode
- "Seeds", 2018 episode; see list of The Handmaid's Tale episodes
- "Seeds", 2007 episode; see Law & Order: Criminal Intent (season 7)
- "Seeds", 2008 episode; see Sons of Anarchy (season 1)
- "The Seed", 2008 episode; see Stargate Atlantis (season 5)
- "The Seed", 2007 episode; see list of Pocoyo episodes

=== Visual arts ===
- Sculptures by the Singaporean sculptor Han Sai Por: Seed Series (1998) and Seeds (2006)

== Education ==
- SEED Foundation, operates boarding schools for disadvantaged youth in Washington, D.C. and Baltimore, Maryland
- SEED School (Toronto), a Toronto District School Board alternative high school in Toronto, Canada

== Organizations ==
- SEED (organization), a global partnership for action on sustainable development and the green economy
- The Seed (organization), a controversial drug rehabilitation program in the US that operated between 1970 and 2001
- Seed Mob, a climate change activist organisation for Aboriginal and Torres Strait Islander young people

== Science and technology ==
=== Computing ===
- Random seed, a value used to initialize a pseudo-random number generator
- SEED, a Korean block cipher
- seed in data build tool, a type of CSV file based reference table for predefined data
- Seed (programming), a JavaScript library of the GNOME
- Seed7, an extensible general-purpose programming language
- Seeding (computing), a practice within peer-to-peer file sharing
  - Seed (BitTorrent), a peer that has a complete copy of a torrented file and still offers it for upload
- Seeds (cellular automaton), a cellular automaton rule similar to Conway's Game of Life

=== Other uses in science and technology ===
- AOL Seed, an open content submission website and platform where writers and photographers could submit their work and get paid for each work submitted
- Seed, a synonym for sperm or semen
- Seed crystal, a small crystal from which a larger single crystal is to be grown
- Standard for the Exchange of Earthquake Data, a data specification from the International Federation of Digital Seismograph Networks
- Strategic Explorations of Exoplanets and Disks with Subaru (SEEDS), a multi-year astronomical survey seeking to identify extrasolar planets and disks around nearby stars using the Subaru telescope in Hawaii

== Other uses ==
- Bīja, literally "seed", a metaphor for the origin or cause of things in Buddhism and Hinduism
- Seed (sports), a ranked competitor for the purposes of a tournament draw
- Seed (surname)
- Seed money, an early stage in the development of an entrepreneurial firm

== See also ==
- Sead (disambiguation)
- Sed (disambiguation)
- The Seed Fund, a private music philanthropic organisation
- Seeding (disambiguation)
- Seedling (disambiguation)
- Seeed, a German band
- SEEEED, a region of the CCDC47 protein
- Seid (disambiguation)
- Seyd (disambiguation)
