= Darzikola-ye Akhundi =

Darzikola-ye Akhundi (Persian: درزئ كلااخوندئ) may refer to:

- Darzikola-ye Akhund-e Baba
- Darzikola-ye Akhundi-ye Bala
- Darzikola-ye Akhundi-ye Pain
