= Sead =

Sead or seads or variation, may refer to:

- Sead (given name), a Bosnian male given name
- Suppression of enemy air defenses (SEAD), a military tactic
- Southeast Air Defense Sector (SEADS), NORAD, NORTHCOM, NATO; a sector operated by the U.S. Air Force
- Seattle Air Defense Sector (SeADS), NORAD, NORTHCOM, NATO; a sector operated by the U.S. Air Force
- Space Ecologies Art and Designs (SEADS), a multinational transdisciplinary art collective founded by Angelo Vermeulen

== See also ==
- Deap Seads, a 2017 art exhibition by HULA (artist)
- Baltimore, County Cork, Ireland (Irish: Dún na Séad, lit. 'Séad Fort')
- Seyd (disambiguation)
- Seed (disambiguation)
- Seid (disambiguation)
- Sad (disambiguation)
- Sed (disambiguation)
- SADS (disambiguation)
- SEDS
