= Veerabhadrappa =

Veerabhadrappa is both a given name and a surname. Notable people with the name include:

- Veerabhadrappa Desai, Indian philanthropist
- Allum Veerabhadrappa, Indian politician
- K. S. Veerabhadrappa (born 1929), Indian politician
- Kumbar Veerabhadrappa (born 1953), Indian novelist
