= Kelagar Mahalleh =

Kelagar Mahalleh (Persian: كلاگرمحله) may refer to:

- Kelagar Mahalleh, Bandpey-ye Gharbi, Babol County
- Kelagar Mahalleh, Bandpey-ye Sharqi, Babol County
- Kelagar Mahalleh, Gatab, Babol County
- Kelagar Mahalleh, Qaem Shahr
