= Kartich Kola =

Kartich Kola كرتيچ كلا
- Village
- Interactive map of Kartich Kola
- Coordinates: 36.4085°N 52.621°E
- Country: Iran
- Province: Mazandaran
- County: Babol
- Bakhsh: Gatab
- Rural District: Gatab-e Jonubi

Population (2016)
  - Total: 412
- Time zone: UTC+3:30 (IRST)

Kartich Kola (Persian: كرتيچ كلا, also Romanized as Kartīch Kolā) is a village in Gatab-e Jonubi Rural District, Gatab District, Babol County, Mazandaran Province, Iran. It is just east of Bala Mir Kola village.

At the time of the 2006 National Census, the village's population was 305 in 81 households. The following census in 2011 counted 353 people in 112 households. The 2016 census measured the population of the village as 412 people in 146 households.
