= Syed =

Syed may refer to:

- Seyd, alternative for Sayyid (name)
- Alternative for Sayyid, an honorific title
- Ahsan Ali Syed (born 1973), Indian businessman
- Ghulam Murtaza Syed (1904-1995), prominent Sindhi politician
- Ibrahim Bijli Syed (born 1939), American radiological scientist, medical physicist, health physicist
- Matthew Syed (born 1970), British journalist
- Nabeela Syed (born 1999), American politician
- Nabiha Syed, American technology lawyer and executive
- Zulfi Syed, Indian model and actor
- Syed Ahmad Barelvi, Indian Islamic Revivalist

== See also ==
- Said (disambiguation)
- Seyd (disambiguation)
- Seyd Kola
