= Pa'in Marznak =

Marznak (Persian: مرزناك) may refer to:

- Bala Marznak
- Pain Marznak
