= Serest =

Serest (Persian: سرست), also rendered as Sar Rost, may refer to:

- Bala Serest
- Pain Serest
