= Molla Mahalleh, Babol =

Village in Mazandaran province, Iran

Molla Mahalleh Persian: ملامحله
- Village
- Location within Iran
- Coordinates: 36.515°N 52.662°E
- Country: Iran
- Province: Mazandaran
- County: Babol
- District: Gatab
- Rural District: Gatab-e Shomali

Population (2016)
  - Total: 724
- Time zone: UTC+3:30 (IRST)

Molla Mahalleh (Persian: ملامحله) (Note: Also romanized as Mollā Maḩalleh) is a village in Gatab-e Shomali Rural District (Note: Formerly Gatab Rural District) of Gatab District in Babol County, Mazandaran province, Iran.

It is a southern suburb of Babol city, between Delavar Kola and Darzikola-ye Akhundi-ye Pain.

== Demographics ==
=== Population ===
At the time of the 2006 National Census, the village's population was 236 in 61 households. The following census in 2011 counted 591 people in 173 households. The 2016 census measured the population of the village as 724 people in 258 households.
