= NSAD =

NSAD may refer to:

- Northern Saskatchewan Administration District (NSAD), Saskatchewan, Canada
- Nationalsozialistischer Arbeitsdienst (NSAD; German: National Socialist Labor Service) of Nazi Germany, the predecessor to the Reichsarbeitsdienst (RAD): Reich Labour Service
- Nuclear Safety Analysis Division (NSAD), part of the Atomic Energy Regulatory Board of India
- National Student-Athlete Day (April 6), a celebration promoted by National Consortium for Academics and Sports

== See also ==
- NSAID
- Sad (disambiguation)
