= Chub Bast =

Chub Bast چوب بست
- Village
- Location within Iran
- Coordinates: 36°24′36″N 52°40′30″E
- Country: Iran
- Province: Mazandaran
- County: Babol
- Bakhsh: Gatab
- Rural District: Gatab-e Jonubi

Population (2016)
  - Total: 329
- Time zone: UTC+3:30 (IRST)

Chub Bast (Persian: چوب بست, also Romanized as Chūb Bast; also known as Chūbast) is a village in Gatab-e Jonubi Rural District, Gatab District, Babol County, Mazandaran Province, Iran.

At the time of the 2006 National Census, the village's population was 343 in 78 households. The following census in 2011 counted 343 people in 104 households. The 2016 census measured the population of the village as 329 people in 112 households.
