= Sead (given name) =

Sead is Bosnian masculine given name equivalent to the Arabic masculine given name Sa'id.

Notable people with the name include:

- Sead Babača (born 1981), Montenegrin football midfielder
- Sead Banda (born 1990), Montenegrin professional football striker
- Sead Bajramović (born 1973), Serbian professional football player
- Sead Brunčević (born 1977), Serbian Bosniak retired football player
- Sead Bučan (born 1981), Bosnian-Herzegovinian footballer
- Sead Čaušević (born 1949), Bosnian politician
- Sead Čelebić (born 1956), Bosnian football midfielder
- Sead Gorani (born 1977), Kosovar footballer
- Sead Hadžibulić (born 1983), Serbian football
- Sead Hajrović (born 1993), Bosnian-Herzegovinian professional footballer
- Sead Hakšabanović (born 1999), Swedish-born Montenegrin footballer
- Sead Halilagić (born 1972), Serbian-born Bosniak former footballer
- Sead Hasanefendić (born 1948), Bosnian handball coach
- Sead Kajtaz (born 1963), Bosnian-Herzegovinian footballer
- Sead Kalač (born 1964), pop-folk singer popular in the former Yugoslavia
- Sead Kapetanović (born 1972), Bosnian-Herzegovinian footballer
- Sead Kolašinac (born 1993), Bosnian-Herzegovinian professional footballer
- Sead Lipovača (born 1955), Bosnian guitarist
- Sead Mašić (born 1959), Bosnian-Herzegovinian footballer
- Sead Mehić (born 1975), Bosnian-Herzegovinian former footballer
- Sead Muratović (born 1979), Serbian footballer
- Sead Ramović (born 1979), Bosnian-Herzegovinian football goalkeeper
- Sead Salahović (born 1977), Serbian professional football player
- Sead Sarajlić (born 1987), Bosnian-Herzegovinian football player
- Sead Seferović (born 1980), Bosnian-Herzegovinian footballer
- Sead Sušić (born 1953), Bosnian-Herzegovinian professional footballer
- Sead Šehović (born 1989), Montenegrin professional basketball player
- Sead Zilić (born 1982), Serbian-born Bosnian-Herzegovinian football player
- Sead Župić (born 1994), Serbian football midfielder

== See also ==
- Sejad
- Sead (disambiguation)
