= Zafaran Kola =

Village in Mazandaran province, Iran

Zafaran Kola Persian: زعفران كلا
- Village
- Location within Iran
- Coordinates: 36°26′19″N 52°38′34″E
- Country: Iran
- Province: Mazandaran
- County: Babol
- District: Gatab
- Rural District: Gatab-e Shomali

Population (2016)
  - Total: 583
- Time zone: UTC+3:30 (IRST)

Zafaran Kola (Persian: زعفران كلا) (Note: Also romanized as Za‘farān Kolā) is a village in Gatab-e Shomali Rural District (Note: Formerly Gatab Rural District) of Gatab District in Babol County, Mazandaran province, Iran.

== Demographics ==
=== Population ===
At the time of the 2006 National Census, the village's population was 580 in 151 households. The following census in 2011 counted 586 people in 175 households. The 2016 census measured the population of the village as 583 people in 187 households.
