= Tari Kola =

Coordinates: 36°27′52″N 52°39′22″E

Tari Kola تاريكلا
- Village
- Interactive map of Tari Kola
- Country: Iran
- Province: Mazandaran
- County: Babol
- Bakhsh: Gatab
- Rural District: Gatab-e Shomali

Population (2016)
  - Total: 187
- Time zone: UTC+3:30 (IRST)

Tari Kola (Persian: تاريكلا, also Romanized as Tārī Kolā) is a village in Gatab-e Shomali Rural District, Gatab District, Babol County, Mazandaran Province, Iran.

At the time of the 2006 National Census, the village's population was 194 in 49 households. The following census in 2011 counted 203 people in 58 households. The 2016 census measured the population of the village as 187 people in 65 households.
