= Bil Pey-e Abu ol Hasan Kola =

Bil Pey-e Abu ol Hasan Kola بيل پی ابوالحسن كلا
- Village
- Interactive map of Bil Pey-e Abu ol Hasan Kola
- Coordinates: 36.388°N 52.633°E
- Country: Iran
- Province: Mazandaran
- County: Babol
- Bakhsh: Gatab
- Rural District: Gatab-e Jonubi

Population (2016)
  - Total: 439
- Time zone: UTC+3:30 (IRST)

Bil Pey-e Abu ol Hasan Kola (Persian: بيل پی ابوالحسن كلا, also Romanized as Bīl Pey-e Abū ol Ḩasan Kolā) is a village in Gatab-e Jonubi Rural District, Gatab District, Babol County, Mazandaran province, Iran.

At the time of the 2006 National Census, the village's population was 493 in 119 households. The following census in 2011 counted 492 people in 141 households. The 2016 census measured the population of the village as 439 people in 154 households.
