= Meydan Sar-e Keshteli =

Village in Mazandaran province, Iran

Meydan Sar-e Keshteli Persian: ميدان سركشتلي
- Village
- Location within Iran
- Coordinates: 36°26′32″N 52°41′31″E
- Country: Iran
- Province: Mazandaran
- County: Babol
- District: Gatab
- Rural District: Gatab-e Shomali

Population (2016)
  - Total: 1,028
- Time zone: UTC+3:30 (IRST)

Meydan Sar-e Keshteli (Persian: ميدان سركشتلي) (Note: Also romanized as Meydān Sar-e Keshtelī; also known as Meydān Sar) is a village in Gatab-e Shomali Rural District (Note: Formerly Gatab Rural District) of Gatab District in Babol County, Mazandaran province, Iran.

== Demographics ==
=== Population ===
At the time of the 2006 National Census, the village's population was 947 in 253 households. The following census in 2011 counted 938 people in 293 households. The 2016 census measured the population of the village as 1,028 people in 357 households.
