= Gavan Kola =

Gavan Kola (Persian: گاوان كلا) may refer to:

- Gavan Kola, Babol Kenar
- Gavan Kola, Gatab
