= Armak, Mazandaran =

Village in Mazandaran province, Iran

Armak Persian: ارمك
- Village
- Location within Iran
- Coordinates: 36°29′06″N 52°40′36″E
- Country: Iran
- Province: Mazandaran
- County: Babol
- District: Gatab
- Rural District: Gatab-e Shomali

Population (2016)
  - Total: 1,182
- Time zone: UTC+3:30 (IRST)

Armak (Persian: ارمك) (Note: Also romanized as Armāk) is a village in Gatab-e Shomali Rural District (Note: Formerly Gatab Rural District) of Gatab District in Babol County, Mazandaran province, Iran.

== Demographics ==
=== Population ===
At the time of the 2006 National Census, the village's population was 1,072 in 259 households. The following census in 2011 counted 1,157 people in 322 households. The 2016 census measured the population of the village as 1,182 people in 401 households.
