= Mashhad Sara =

Mashhad Sara مشهدسرا
- Village
- Location within Iran
- Coordinates: 36°23′40″N 52°38′46″E
- Country: Iran
- Province: Mazandaran
- County: Babol
- Bakhsh: Gatab
- Rural District: Gatab-e Jonubi

Population (2016)
  - Total: 467
- Time zone: UTC+3:30 (IRST)

Mashhad Sara (Persian: مشهدسرا, also Romanized as Mashhad Sarā) is a village in Gatab-e Jonubi Rural District, Gatab District, Babol County, Mazandaran Province, Iran.

At the time of the 2006 National Census, the village's population was 407 in 100 households. The following census in 2011 counted 440 people in 129 households. The 2016 census measured the population of the village as 467 people in 158 households.
