= Valu Kola =

Village in Mazandaran province, Iran

Valu Kola Persian: ولوكلا
- Village
- Location within Iran
- Coordinates: 36°24′01″N 52°41′08″E
- Country: Iran
- Province: Mazandaran
- County: Babol
- District: Gatab
- Rural District: Gatab-e Jonubi

Population (2016)
  - Total: 1,481
- Time zone: UTC+3:30 (IRST)

Valu Kola (Persian: ولوكلا) (Note: Also romanized as Valū Kalā and Valū Kolā) is a village in Gatab-e Jonubi Rural District of Gatab District in Babol County, Mazandaran province, Iran.

== Demographics ==
At the time of the 2006 National Census, the village's population was 1,586 in 410 households. The following census in 2011 counted 1,567 people in 470 households. The 2016 census measured the population of the village as 1,481 people in 495 households.
