= Shir Savar =

Village in Mazandaran province, Iran

Shir Savar Persian: شيرسوار
- Village
- Location within Iran
- Coordinates: 36°28′03″N 52°37′57″E
- Country: Iran
- Province: Mazandaran
- County: Babol
- District: Gatab
- Rural District: Gatab-e Shomali

Population (2016)
  - Total: 953
- Time zone: UTC+3:30 (IRST)

Shir Savar (Persian: شيرسوار) (Note: Also romanized as Shīr Savār) is a village in Gatab-e Shomali Rural District (Note: Formerly Gatab Rural District) of Gatab District in Babol County, Mazandaran province, Iran.

== Demographics ==
=== Population ===
At the time of the 2006 National Census, the village's population was 995 in 227 households. The following census in 2011 counted 976 people in 272 households. The 2016 census measured the population of the village as 953 people in 293 households.
