= Otaq Sara, Babol =

Village in Mazandaran province, Iran

Otaq Sara Persian: اطاق سرا
- Village
- Location within Iran
- Coordinates: 36°23′59″N 52°38′21″E
- Country: Iran
- Province: Mazandaran
- County: Babol
- District: Gatab
- Rural District: Gatab-e Jonubi

Population (2016)
  - Total: 1,521
- Time zone: UTC+3:30 (IRST)

Otaq Sara (Persian: اطاق سرا) (Note: Also romanized as Oţāq Sarā; also known as Ojāq Sarā and Oţāq Sar) is a village in Gatab-e Jonubi Rural District of Gatab District in Babol County, Mazandaran province, Iran.

== Demographics ==
=== Population ===
At the time of the 2006 National Census, the village's population was 1,468 in 349 households. The following census in 2011 counted 1,390 people in 388 households. The 2016 census measured the population of the village as 1,521 people in 496 households.
