= Seyyed Kola =

Seyyed Kola or Seyyed Kala or Seyd Kola (Persian: افيداسسيدكل) may refer to:

- Seyyed Kola, Babol Kenar, Babol County
- Seyyed Kola, Gatab, Babol County
- Bala Seyyed Kola, Gatab District, Babol County
- Pain Seyyed Kola, Gatab District, Babol County
- Seyyed Kola, Juybar
- Seyyed Kola, Nur
