= Chenar Bon-e Keshteli =

Village in Mazandaran province, Iran

Chenar Bon-e Keshteli Persian: چناربن كشتلي
- Village
- Location within Iran
- Coordinates: 36°25′39″N 52°40′51″E
- Country: Iran
- Province: Mazandaran
- County: Babol
- District: Gatab
- Rural District: Gatab-e Shomali

Population (2016)
  - Total: 505
- Time zone: UTC+3:30 (IRST)

Chenar Bon-e Keshteli (Persian: چناربن كشتلي) (Note: Also romanized as Chenār Bon-e Keshtelī; also known as Chenār Bon) is a village in Gatab-e Shomali Rural District (Note: Formerly Gatab Rural District) of Gatab District in Babol County, Mazandaran province, Iran.

== Demographics ==
=== Population ===
At the time of the 2006 National Census, the village's population was 460 in 113 households. The following census in 2011 counted 443 people in 136 households. The 2016 census measured the population of the village as 505 people in 169 households.
