= Abu ol Hasan Kola =

Village in Mazandaran province, Iran

Abu ol Hasan Kola Persian: ابوالحسن كلا
- Village
- Location within Iran
- Coordinates: 36°23′10″N 52°38′07″E
- Country: Iran
- Province: Mazandaran
- County: Babol
- District: Gatab
- Rural District: Gatab-e Jonubi

Population (2016)
  - Total: 1,032
- Time zone: UTC+3:30 (IRST)

Abu ol Hasan Kola (Persian: ابوالحسن كلا) (Note: Also romanized as Abū ol Ḩasan Kalā and Abū ol Ḩasan Kolā; also known as Abowlhasan Kolā) is a village in Gatab-e Jonubi Rural District of Gatab District in Babol County, Mazandaran province, Iran.

== Demographics ==
=== Population ===
At the time of the 2006 National Census, the village's population was 1,049 in 247 households. The following census in 2011 counted 1,070 people in 297 households. The 2016 census measured the population of the village as 1,032 people in 343 households.
