= Najjar (disambiguation) =

Najjar is a surname.

Najjar may also refer to:

- Najjar, Iran (disambiguation), several villages in Iran
- Najar, an alternative name of the Jewish Najara family

== See also ==
- Banu Najjar, the name of several Arab tribes.
- Jand Najjar, small village near the city of Gujar Khan, in the district of Rawalpindi in Pakistan
