= Ahangar Kola, Gatab =

Village in Mazandaran province, Iran

Ahangar Kola Persian: آهنگركلا
- Village
- Location within Iran
- Coordinates: 36°23′53″N 52°40′30″E
- Country: Iran
- Province: Mazandaran
- County: Babol
- District: Gatab
- Rural District: Gatab-e Jonubi

Population (2016)
  - Total: 3,500
- Time zone: UTC+3:30 (IRST)

Ahangar Kola Persian: آهنگركلا) (Note: Also romanized as Ahangar Kala, Āhangar Kalā, Ahangar Kela, and Āhangar Kolā) is a village in Gatab-e Jonubi Rural District of Gatab District in Babol County, Mazandaran province, Iran.

== Demographics ==
=== Population ===
At the time of the 2006 National Census, the village's population was 3,690 in 870 households. The following census in 2011 counted 3,748 people in 1,113 households. The 2016 census measured the population of the village as 3,500 people in 1,100 households. It was the most populous village in its rural district.
