= Najjar, Iran =

Najjar (Persian: نجار) may refer to:

- Najjar, Kermanshah, in Howli Rural District, Kermanshah Province
- Najjar, Gilan-e Gharb, in Direh Rural District, Kermanshah Province
- Najjar, Mazandaran, Gatab-e Shomali Rural District, Mazandaran Province
- Najjar, West Azerbaijan, Keshavarz Rural District, West Azerbaijan Province
- Najjar Kola, Babol, also known as Najjār
- Najjar Kola, Amol, also known as Najjār
- Najjar Kola, Chalus, also known as Najjār
