= Pain Mahalleh-ye Keshteli =

Village in Mazandaran province, Iran

Pain Mahalleh-ye Keshteli Persian: پائين محله كشتلي
- Village
- Location within Iran
- Coordinates: 36°26′05″N 52°40′27″E
- Country: Iran
- Province: Mazandaran
- County: Babol
- District: Gatab
- Rural District: Gatab-e Shomali

Population (2016)
  - Total: 790
- Time zone: UTC+3:30 (IRST)

Pain Mahalleh-ye Keshteli (Persian: پائين محله كشتلي) (Note: Also romanized as Pā’īn Maḩalleh-ye Keshtelī) is a village in Gatab-e Shomali Rural District (Note: Formerly Gatab Rural District) of Gatab District in Babol County, Mazandaran province, Iran.

== Demographics ==
=== Population ===
At the time of the 2006 National Census, the village's population was 713 in 184 households. The following census in 2011 counted 819 people in 244 households. The 2016 census measured the population of the village as 790 people in 268 households.
