= Bengar Kola =

Village in Mazandaran province, Iran

Bengar Kola Persian: بنگركلا
- Village
- Location within Iran
- Coordinates: 36°26′51″N 52°38′25″E
- Country: Iran
- Province: Mazandaran
- County: Babol
- District: Gatab
- Rural District: Gatab-e Shomali

Population (2016)
  - Total: 607
- Time zone: UTC+3:30 (IRST)

Bengar Kola (Persian: بنگركلا) (Note: Also romanized as Bengar Kolā) is a village in Gatab-e Shomali Rural District (Note: Formerly Gatab Rural District) of Gatab District in Babol County, Mazandaran province, Iran.

== Demographics ==
=== Population ===
At the time of the 2006 National Census, the village's population was 686 in 163 households. The following census in 2011 counted 630 people in 189 households. The 2016 census measured the population of the village as 607 people in 204 households.
