= Sarun Kheyl =

Sarun Kheyl سارون خيل
- Village
- Location within Iran
- Coordinates: 36°27′55″N 52°39′26″E
- Country: Iran
- Province: Mazandaran
- County: Babol
- Bakhsh: Gatab
- Rural District: Gatab-e Shomali

Population (2016)
  - Total: 61
- Time zone: UTC+3:30 (IRST)

Sscaddcvarun Kheyl (Persian: سارون خيل, also Romanized as Sārūn Kheyl; also known as Sarūn Kheyr) is a village in Gatab-e Shomali Rural District, Gatab District, Babol County, Mazandaran Province, Iran.

At the time of the 2006 National Census, the village's population was 72 in 19 households. The following census in 2011 counted 81 people in 22 households. The 2016 census measured the population of the village as 61 people in 21 households.
