= Yur Mahalleh =

Yur Mahalleh (Persian: يورمحله) may refer to:

- Yur Mahalleh, Babol
- Yur Mahalleh, Sari
