= Afra Kati va Lu Kola =

Afra Kati-ye Valu Kola افراکتی ولوکلا
- Village
- Location within Iran
- Coordinates: 36°23′27″N 52°40′11″E
- Country: Iran
- Province: Mazandaran
- County: Babol
- Bakhsh: Gatab
- Rural District: Gatab-e Jonubi

Population (2016)
  - Total: 160
- Time zone: UTC+3:30 (IRST)

Afra Kati-ye Valu Kola (Persian: افراکتی ولوکلا, also Romanized as Afrā Katī-ye Valūkalā; also known as Afrā Katī) is a village in Gatab-e Jonubi Rural District, Gatab District, Babol County, Mazandaran Province, Iran.

At the time of the 2006 National Census, the village's population was 191 in 46 households. The following census in 2011 counted 196 people in 64 households. The 2016 census measured the population of the village as 160 people in 53 households.
