= Darzikola-ye Nasirai =

Village in Mazandaran province, Iran

Darzikola-ye Nasirai Persian: درزيكلانصيرائي
- Village
- Location within Iran
- Coordinates: 36°30′38″N 52°40′17″E
- Country: Iran
- Province: Mazandaran
- County: Babol
- District: Gatab
- Rural District: Gatab-e Shomali

Population (2016)
  - Total: 1,942
- Time zone: UTC+3:30 (IRST)

Darzikola-ye Nasirai (Persian: درزيكلانصيرائي) (Note: Also romanized as Darzīkolā-ye Naşīrā’ī) is a village in Gatab-e Shomali Rural District (Note: Formerly Gatab Rural District) of Gatab District in Babol County, Mazandaran province, Iran.

== Demographics ==
=== Population ===
At the time of the 2006 National Census, the village's population was 1,828 in 457 households. The following census in 2011 counted 1,934 people in 597 households. The 2016 census measured the population of the village as 1,942 people in 677 households.
