= Shub Mahalleh =

Village in Mazandaran province, Iran

Shub Mahalleh Persian: شوب محله
- Village
- Location within Iran
- Coordinates: 36°25′55″N 52°41′36″E
- Country: Iran
- Province: Mazandaran
- County: Babol
- District: Gatab
- Rural District: Gatab-e Shomali

Population (2016)
  - Total: 536
- Time zone: UTC+3:30 (IRST)

Shub Mahalleh (Persian: شوب محله) (Note: Also romanized as Showb Mahalleh, Showb Maḩalleh and Shūb Maḩalleh) is a village in Gatab-e Shomali Rural District (Note: Formerly Gatab Rural District) of Gatab District in Babol County, Mazandaran province, Iran.

== Demographics ==
=== Population ===
At the time of the 2006 National Census, the village's population was 453 in 117 households. The following census in 2011 counted 469 people in 144 households. The 2016 census measured the population of the village as 536 people in 186 households.
