= Gol Chub =

Village in Mazandaran province, Iran

Gol Chub Persian: گل چوب
- Village
- Location within Iran
- Coordinates: 36°25′37″N 52°37′20″E
- Country: Iran
- Province: Mazandaran
- County: Babol
- District: Gatab
- Rural District: Gatab-e Shomali

Population (2016)
  - Total: 604
- Time zone: UTC+3:30 (IRST)

Gol Chub (Persian: گل چوب) (Note: Also romanized as Gol Chūb) is a village in Gatab-e Shomali Rural District (Note: Formerly Gatab Rural District) of Gatab District in Babol County, Mazandaran province, Iran.

== Demographics ==
=== Population ===
At the time of the 2006 National Census, the village's population was 636 in 152 households. The following census in 2011 counted 638 people in 186 households. The 2016 census measured the population of the village as 604 people in 214 households.
