= Sar Hammam-e Abu ol Hasan =

Sar Hammam-e Abu ol Hasan Kala سرحمام ابوالحسن كلا
- Village
- Interactive map of Sar Hammam-e Abu ol Hasan Kala
- Coordinates: 36.395°N 52.64°E
- Country: Iran
- Province: Mazandaran
- County: Babol
- Bakhsh: Gatab
- Rural District: Gatab-e Jonubi

Population (2016)
  - Total: 404
- Time zone: UTC+3:30 (IRST)

Sar Hammam-e Abu ol Hasan Kala (Persian: سرحمام ابوالحسن كلا, also Romanized as Sar Ḩammām-e Abū ol Ḩasan Kolā) is a village in Gatab-e Jonubi Rural District, Gatab District, Babol County, Mazandaran Province, Iran. At the 2006 census, its population was 414, in 105 families.

At the time of the 2006 National Census, the village's population was 414 in 105 households. The following census in 2011 counted 409 people in 114 households. The 2016 census measured the population of the village as 404 people in 137 households.
