= Surben, Babol =

Surben سوربن
- Village
- Location within Iran
- Coordinates: 36°30′00″N 52°40′00″E
- Country: Iran
- Province: Mazandaran
- County: Babol
- Bakhsh: Gatab
- Rural District: Gatab-e Shomali

Population (2016)
  - Total: 417
- Time zone: UTC+3:30 (IRST)

Surben (Persian: سوربن, also Romanized as Sūrben) is a village in Gatab-e Shomali Rural District, Gatab District, Babol County, Mazandaran Province, Iran.

At the time of the 2006 National Census, the village's population was 441 in 109 households. The following census in 2011 counted 392 people in 111 households. The 2016 census measured the population of the village as 417 people in 138 households.
