= Kharrat Kola =

Kharrat Kola (Persian: خراطكلا) may refer to:

- Kharrat Kola, Babol
- Kharrat Kola, Simorgh
