= Kolur Basavanagoud =

Indian politician (1934–2022)

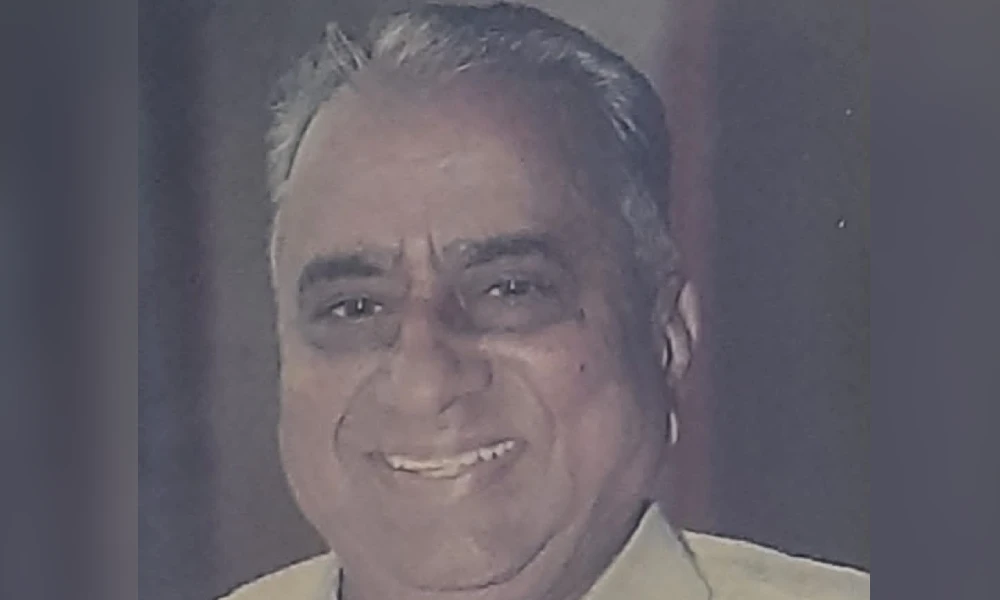

Member of Parliament, Lok Sabha
- In office 2000 – 2004
- Preceded by: K. C. Kondaiah; Sonia Gandhi (vacated)
- Succeeded by: G. Karunakara Reddy
- Constituency: Bellary

Personal details
- Born: 1 July 1934 Kolur, Bellary district (Karnataka)
- Died: 25 November 2022 (aged 88) Bellary (Karnataka)
- Party: Indian National Congress
- Spouse: K. Kamakshamma (15 May 1960)
- Children: 2 sons and 1 daughter
- Parent: Shri K. Thimmanagoud (father) Smt Hompamma (mother)
- Education: S.G. Junior College and Veerasaiva College, Bellary and Hindu College, Guntur (Andhra Pradesh)
- Profession: Educationist, Industrialist

Kolur Basavanagoud (1 July 1934 – 25 November 2022) was an Indian politician, educationist, and industrialist who served as a member of the Indian Parliament in the 13th Lok Sabha from the Bellary Lok Sabha constituency. He was a member of the Indian National Congress.

Basavanagoud was instrumental in the development and formation of two Engineering Colleges, one Polytechnic and one Institute of Management Studies for Veerasaiva Vidya Vardhaka Sangha.

== Early life and background ==
Kolur Basavanagoud was born to Shri K. Thimmanagoud and Smt Hompamma on 1 July 1934 in Kolur village of Bellary district, Karnataka. He completed his education at S.G. Junior College and Veerasaiva College, Bellary, Karnataka and Hindu College, Guntur, Andhra Pradesh.

== Personal life ==
Kolur Basavanagoud married K. Kamakshamma on 15 May 1960. They have two sons and one daughter.

== Electoral history ==
By Election, 2000: Bellary
Party	Candidate	Votes	%	±%
INC	Kolur Basavanagoud	2,59,851	50.6	
BJP	K. S. Veerbhadrappa	1,63,831	31.9	
Majority		96,020	18.7	
Turnout		5,13,164	42.45	
INC hold		Swing		

== Positions held ==
- Chairman, District Congress Campaign Committee for Lok Sabha and Assembly Elections, 1999
- Joint Secretary of V.V. Sangha, Bellary
- Member of Zonal Railway Users Committee
- President, Lions Club, Bellary, 1975–78
- President, Youth Congress, Bellary 1965-70
- Secretary, Academic Council, Gulbarga University

#	From	To	Position
1.	1965	1970	President of Youth Congress - Bellary.
2.	1999	-	Chairman of District Congress Campaign Committee for the Lok Sabha and Assembly Elections.
3.	2000	2004	Member of Parliament in 13th Lok Sabha from Bellary: Member of Committee on External Affairs
