= Yursiah-e Kola Mahalleh =

Yursiah-e Kola Mahalleh يورسياه كلامحله
- Village
- Location within Iran
- Coordinates: 36°30′00″N 52°40′00″E
- Country: Iran
- Province: Mazandaran
- County: Babol
- Bakhsh: Gatab
- Rural District: Gatab-e Shomali

Population (2016)
  - Total: 275
- Time zone: UTC+3:30 (IRST)

Yursiah-e Kola Mahalleh (Persian: يورسياه كلامحله, also Romanized as Yūrsīāh-e Kalā Maḩalleh) is a village in Gatab-e Shomali Rural District, Gatab District, Babol County, Mazandaran Province, Iran.

At the time of the 2006 National Census, the village's population was 264 in 72 households. The following census in 2011 counted 275 people in 83 households. The 2016 census measured the population of the village as 275 people in 93 households.
