= Zita Kola =

Village in Mazandaran province, Iran

Zita Kola Persian: زيتاكلا
- Village
- Location within Iran
- Coordinates: 36°27′33″N 52°40′06″E
- Country: Iran
- Province: Mazandaran
- County: Babol
- District: Gatab
- Rural District: Gatab-e Shomali

Population (2016)
  - Total: 516
- Time zone: UTC+3:30 (IRST)

Zita Kola (Persian: زيتاكلا) (Note: Also romanized as Zītā Kolā) is a village in Gatab-e Shomali Rural District (Note: Formerly Gatab Rural District) of Gatab District in Babol County, Mazandaran province, Iran.

== Demographics ==
=== Population ===
At the time of the 2006 National Census, the village's population was 452 in 114 households. The following census in 2011 counted 450 people in 126 households. The 2016 census measured the population of the village as 516 people in 170 households.
