= Bala Marzbal =

Village in Mazandaran province, Iran

Bala Marzbal Persian: بالا مرزبال
- Village
- Location within Iran
- Coordinates: 36°23′22″N 52°40′06″E
- Country: Iran
- Province: Mazandaran
- County: Babol
- District: Gatab
- Rural District: Gatab-e Jonubi

Population (2016)
  - Total: 152
- Time zone: UTC+3:30 (IRST)

Bala Marzbal (Persian: بالامرزبال) (Note: Also romanized as Bālā Marzbāl) is a village in, and the capital of, Gatab-e Jonubi Rural District in Gatab District of Babol County, Mazandaran province, Iran.

== Demographics ==
=== Population ===
At the time of the 2006 National Census, the village's population was 149 in 36 households. The following census in 2011 counted 156 people in 45 households. The 2016 census measured the population of the village as 152 people in 45 households.
