= Hajji Kola, Gatab =

Village in Mazandaran province, Iran

Hajji Kola Persian: حاجيكلا
- Village
- Location within Iran
- Coordinates: 36°29′46″N 52°39′59″E
- Country: Iran
- Province: Mazandaran
- County: Babol
- District: Gatab
- Rural District: Gatab-e Shomali

Population (2016)
  - Total: 1,336
- Time zone: UTC+3:30 (IRST)

Hajji Kola (Persian: حاجيكلا) (Note: Also romanized as Ḩājjī Kolā; also known as Ḩājjī Kolā-ye Bālā) is a village in Gatab-e Shomali Rural District (Note: Formerly Gatab Rural District) of Gatab District in Babol County, Mazandaran province, Iran.

== Demographics ==
=== Population ===
At the time of the 2006 National Census, the village's population was 1,128 in 291 households. The following census in 2011 counted 1,285 people in 383 households. The 2016 census measured the population of the village as 1,336 people in 433 households.
