= Dun Sar =

Village in Mazandaran province, Iran

Dun Sar Persian: دون سر
- Village
- Location within Iran
- Coordinates: 36°27′26″N 52°37′57″E
- Country: Iran
- Province: Mazandaran
- County: Babol
- District: Gatab
- Rural District: Gatab-e Shomali

Population (2016)
  - Total: 1,477
- Time zone: UTC+3:30 (IRST)

Dun Sar (Persian: دون سر) (Note: Also romanized as Dūn Sar; also known as Dūneh Sar) is a village in Gatab-e Shomali Rural District (Note: Formerly Gatab Rural District) of Gatab District in Babol County, Mazandaran province, Iran.

== Demographics ==
=== Population ===
At the time of the 2006 National Census, the village's population was 1,776 in 456 households. The following census in 2011 counted 1,725 people in 507 households. The 2016 census measured the population of the village as 1,477 people in 492 households.
