= Pain Mir Kola =

Village in Mazandaran province, Iran

Pain Mir Kola Persian: پائين ميركلا
- Village
- Location within Iran
- Coordinates: 36°28′26″N 52°39′13″E
- Country: Iran
- Province: Mazandaran
- County: Babol
- District: Gatab
- Rural District: Gatab-e Shomali

Population (2016)
  - Total: 709
- Time zone: UTC+3:30 (IRST)

Pain Mir Kola (Persian: پائين ميركلا) (Note: Also romanized as Pā’īn Mīr Kolā; also known as Mīr Kolā) is a village in Gatab-e Shomali Rural District (Note: Formerly Gatab Rural District) of Gatab District in Babol County, Mazandaran province, Iran.

== Demographics ==
=== Population ===
At the time of the 2006 National Census, the village's population was 782 in 210 households. The following census in 2011 counted 785 people in 239 households. The 2016 census measured the population of the village as 709 people in 247 households.
