= Molla Mahalleh =

Molla Mahalleh (Persian: ملامحله) may refer to:

- Molla Mahalleh, Siahkal, Gilan Province
- Molla Mahalleh, Talesh, Gilan Province
- Molla Mahalleh-ye Chehel Setun, Gilan Province
- Molla Mahalleh, Babol, Mazandaran Province
- Molla Mahalleh, Nur, Mazandaran Province
