= Kaseman Kola =

Kaseman Kola كاسمان كلا
- Village
- Location within Iran
- Coordinates: 36°26′12″N 52°38′02″E
- Country: Iran
- Province: Mazandaran
- County: Babol
- Bakhsh: Gatab
- Rural District: Gatab-e Shomali

Population (2016)
  - Total: 400
- Time zone: UTC+3:30 (IRST)

Kaseman Kola (Persian: كاسمان كلا, also Romanized as Kāsemān Kolā; also known as Kāsebān Kolā) is a village in Gatab-e Shomali Rural District, Gatab District, Babol County, Mazandaran Province, Iran.

At the time of the 2006 National Census, the village's population was 400 people. The following census in 2011 counted 384 people in 118 households. The 2016 census measured the population of the village as 400 people in 138 households.
