= Kafshgar Kola =

Village in Mazandaran province, Iran

Kafshgar Kola Persian: كفشگركلا
- Village
- Location within Iran
- Coordinates: 36°26′30″N 52°39′11″E
- Country: Iran
- Province: Mazandaran
- County: Babol
- District: Gatab
- Rural District: Gatab-e Shomali

Population (2016)
  - Total: 1,178
- Time zone: UTC+3:30 (IRST)

Kafshgar Kola (Persian: كفشگركلا) (Note: Also romanized as Kafshgar Kolā) is a village in Gatab-e Shomali Rural District (Note: Formerly Gatab Rural District) of Gatab District in Babol County, Mazandaran province, Iran.

== Demographics ==
=== Population ===
At the time of the 2006 National Census, the village's population was 1,162 in 268 households. The following census in 2011 counted 1,218 people in 371 households. The 2016 census measured the population of the village as 1,178 people in 386 households.
