= Pain Marzbal =

Village in Mazandaran province, Iran

Pain Marzbal Persian: پايين مرزبال
- Village
- Location within Iran
- Coordinates: 36°24′44″N 52°39′03″E
- Country: Iran
- Province: Mazandaran
- County: Babol
- District: Gatab
- Rural District: Gatab-e Jonubi

Population (2016)
  - Total: 1,194
- Time zone: UTC+3:30 (IRST)

Pain Marzbal (Persian: پايين مرزبال) (Note: Also romanized as Pā’īn Marzbāl) is a village in Gatab-e Jonubi Rural District of Gatab District in Babol County, Mazandaran province, Iran.

== Demographics ==
=== Population ===
At the time of the 2006 National Census, the village's population was 1,110 in 246 households. The following census in 2011 counted 1,147 people in 340 households. The 2016 census measured the population of the village as 1,194 people in 367 households.
