= Bala Seyyed Kola =

Bala Seyyed Kola بالاسيدكلا
- Village
- Location within Iran
- Coordinates: 36°37′00″N 52°39′00″E
- Country: Iran
- Province: Mazandaran
- County: Babol
- Bakhsh: Gatab
- Rural District: Gatab-e Jonubi

Population (2016)
  - Total: 137
- Time zone: UTC+3:30 (IRST)

Bala Seyyed Kola (Persian: بالاسيدكلا, also Romanized as Bālā Seyyed Kolā; also known as Seyyed Kolā-ye Bālā) is a village in Gatab-e Jonubi Rural District, Gatab District, Babol County, Mazandaran Province, Iran.

At the time of the 2006 National Census, the village's population was 139 in 37 households. The following census in 2011 counted 120 people in 42 households. The 2016 census measured the population of the village as 137 people in 50 households.
