= Seyd =

Seyd may refer to:

- Seyd, alternative for Sayyid
- Ernest Seyd (1830 – 1881), German-born British author, banker, and economist

== See also ==
- Said (disambiguation)
- Seid (disambiguation)
- Syed (disambiguation)
- Seyd Kola
