= Sadness (disambiguation) =

Sadness is an emotion associated with loss and grief.

Sadness may also refer to:

- Sadness, canceled Wii video game
- Sadness, character in Pixar's Inside Out franchise
- The Sadness, 2021 film by Rob Jabbaz
- Carlos Sadness, Spanish singer, songwriter, and illustrator
- Tree of sadness, Nyctanthes arbor-tristis
- Sadness, depressive suicidal black metal project from Illinois, USA
- "Sadness", song from the New Found Metal album Radiosurgery

== See also ==
- Sad (disambiguation)
