= Sejad =

Sejad is a masculine Bosnian given name equivalent to the Arabic masculine given name Sa'id. . Notable people with the name include:

- Sejad Krdžalić, Yugoslav athletics competitor
- Sejad Salihović, Bosnian association football player

== See also ==
- Sead (given name)
