= Seyyed Kola, Gatab =

Seyyed Kola سيدكلا
- Village
- Location within Iran
- Coordinates: 36°26′50″N 52°40′48″E
- Country: Iran
- Province: Mazandaran
- County: Babol
- Bakhsh: Gatab
- Rural District: Gatab-e Shomali

Population (2016)
  - Total: 194
- Time zone: UTC+3:30 (IRST)

Seyyed Kola (Persian: سيدكلا, also Romanized as Seyyed Kolā) is a village in Gatab-e Shomali Rural District, Gatab District, Babol County, Mazandaran Province, Iran.

At the time of the 2006 National Census, the village's population was 198 in 51 households. The following census in 2011 counted 183 people in 51 households. The 2016 census measured the population of the village as 194 people in 71 households.
