= Darzikola-ye Akhund-e Baba =

Darzikola-ye Akhund-e Baba درزيكلا آخوندبابا
- Village
- Location within Iran
- Coordinates: 36°30′22″N 52°39′54″E
- Country: Iran
- Province: Mazandaran
- County: Babol
- Bakhsh: Gatab
- Rural District: Gatab-e Shomali

Population (2016)
  - Total: 289
- Time zone: UTC+3:30 (IRST)

Darzikola-ye Akhund-e Baba (Persian: درزيكلا آخوندبابا, also Romanized as Darzīkolā-ye Ākhūnd-e Bābā; also known as Darzīkolā-ye Ākhūndī) is a village in Gatab-e Shomali Rural District, Gatab District, Babol County, Mazandaran Province, Iran.

At the time of the 2006 National Census, the village's population was 340 in 82 households. The following census in 2011 counted 298 people in 92 households. The 2016 census measured the population of the village as 289 people in 91 households.
