= Najjar Kola, Babol =

Najjar Kola نجاركلا
- Village
- Location within Iran
- Coordinates: 36°29′50″N 52°39′23″E
- Country: Iran
- Province: Mazandaran
- County: Babol
- Bakhsh: Gatab
- Rural District: Gatab-e Shomali

Population (2016)
  - Total: 411
- Time zone: UTC+3:30 (IRST)

Najjar Kola (Persian: نجاركلا, also Romanized as Najjār Kolā; also known as Najjār) is a village in Gatab-e Shomali Rural District, Gatab District, Babol County, Mazandaran Province, Iran.

At the time of the 2006 National Census, the village's population was 391 people living in 86 households. The following census in 2011 counted 383 people in 98 households. The 2016 census recorded the village's population as 411 people in 130 households.
