= Kharrat Kola, Babol =

Kharrat Kola خراطكلا
- Village
- Location within Iran
- Coordinates: 36°25′06″N 52°37′36″E
- Country: Iran
- Province: Mazandaran
- County: Babol
- Bakhsh: Gatab
- Rural District: Gatab-e Jonubi

Population (2016)
  - Total: 220
- Time zone: UTC+3:30 (IRST)

Kharrat Kola (Persian: خراطكلا, also Romanized as Kharrāt Kolā and Kharrāţ Kolā) is a village in Gatab-e Jonubi Rural District, Gatab District, Babol County, Mazandaran Province, Iran.

At the time of the 2006 National Census, the village's population was 223 in 53 households. The following census in 2011 counted 220 people in 67 households. The 2016 census measured the population of the village as 220 people in 79 households.
