= Gatab-e Shomali Rural District =

Rural district in Mazandaran province, Iran

Gatab-e Shomali Rural District Persian: دهستان گتاب شمالی
- Rural District
- Location within Iran
- Coordinates: 36°26′N 52°39′E
- Country: Iran
- Province: Mazandaran
- County: Babol
- District: Gatab
- Established: 1987
- Capital: Gatab

Population (2016)
  - Total: 24,650
- Time zone: UTC+3:30 (IRST)

Gatab-e Shomali Rural District (Persian: دهستان گتاب شمالی) (Note: Formerly Gatab Rural District (دهستان گتاب)) is in Gatab District of Babol County, Mazandaran province, Iran. It is administered from the city of Gatab.

== Demographics ==
=== Population ===
At the time of the 2006 National Census, the rural district's population was 23,405 in 5,909 households. There were 23,844 inhabitants in 7,076 households at the following census of 2011. The 2016 census measured the population of the rural district as 24,650 in 8,240 households. The most populous of its 30 villages was Darzikola-ye Akhundi-ye Pain, with 2,153 people.

=== Other villages in the rural district ===
- Armak
- Bala Serest
- Bengar Kola
- Chenar Bon-e Keshteli
- Darzikola-ye Akhund-e Baba
- Darzikola-ye Akhundi-ye Bala
- Darzikola-ye Nasirai
- Delavar Kola
- Dun Sar
- Gol Chub
- Hajji Kola
- Kafshgar Kola
- Kaseman Kola
- Kelagar Mahalleh
- Meydan Sar-e Keshteli
- Molla Mahalleh
- Najjar Kola
- Pain Mahalleh-ye Keshteli
- Pain Mir Kola
- Pain Serest
- Sarun Kheyl
- Seyyed Kola
- Shir Savar
- Showb Mahalleh
- Surben
- Tari Kola
- Yursiah-e Kola Mahalleh
- Zafaran Kola
- Zita Kola
