= Delavar Kola, Gatab =

Village in Mazandaran province, Iran

Delavar Kola Persian: دلاوركلا
- Village
- Location within Iran
- Coordinates: 36°31′02″N 52°39′45″E
- Country: Iran
- Province: Mazandaran
- County: Babol
- District: Gatab
- Rural District: Gatab-e Shomali

Population (2016)
  - Total: 908
- Time zone: UTC+3:30 (IRST)

Delavar Kola (Persian: دلاوركلا) (Note: Also romanized as Delāvar Kolā) is a village in Gatab-e Shomali Rural District (Note: Formerly Gatab Rural District) of Gatab District in Babol County, Mazandaran province, Iran.

== Demographics ==
=== Population ===
At the time of the 2006 National Census, the village's population was 880 in 242 households. The following census in 2011 counted 618 people in 187 households. The 2016 census measured the population of the village as 908 people in 288 households.
