= Seedling (disambiguation) =

A seedling is young plant after germination from seeds (sometimes also referred to as sprouts).

Seedling may also refer to:

- Seedlings (novel), a book in the Deathlands series by James Axler
- Seedlings (film), a Pakistani film directed by Mansoor Mujahid

== See also ==
- Seed (disambiguation)
- Seeding (disambiguation)
- Seedling bed, a specially prepared box used to grow plants
- Chance seedling, a plant cultivar discovered by chance
