= Pain Serest =

Pain Serest پايين سرست
- Village
- Location within Iran
- Coordinates: 36°27′21″N 52°40′22″E
- Country: Iran
- Province: Mazandaran
- County: Babol
- Bakhsh: Gatab
- Rural District: Gatab-e Shomali

Population (2016)
  - Total: 413
- Time zone: UTC+3:30 (IRST)

Pain Serest (Persian: پايين سرست, also Romanized as Pā’īn Serest; also known as Pā’īn Sar Rost) is a village in Gatab-e Shomali Rural District, Gatab District, Babol County, Mazandaran Province, Iran.

At the time of the 2006 National Census, the village's population was 366 in 87 households. The following census in 2011 counted 317 people in 96 households. The 2016 census measured the population of the village as 413 people in 139 households.
