= Bala Serest =

Village in Mazandaran province, Iran

Bala Serest Persian: بالاسرست
- Village
- Location within Iran
- Coordinates: 36°26′46″N 52°39′22″E
- Country: Iran
- Province: Mazandaran
- County: Babol
- District: Gatab
- Rural District: Gatab-e Shomali

Population (2016)
  - Total: 1,025
- Time zone: UTC+3:30 (IRST)

Bala Serest (Persian: بالاسرست) (Note: Also romanized as Bālā Serest; also known as Bālā Sar Rost) is a village in Gatab-e Shomali Rural District (Note: Formerly Gatab Rural District) of Gatab District in Babol County, Mazandaran province, Iran.

== Demographics ==
=== Population ===
At the time of the 2006 National Census, the village's population was 993 in 228 households. The following census in 2011 counted 940 people in 257 households. The 2016 census measured the population of the village as 1,025 people in 347 households.
