= Veerabhadrappa Desai =

Rao Bahadur Sardar Veerabhadrappa Gunappa Desai
- Born: August 30, 1882
- Occupation: Ruler
- Known for: Philanthropy
- Spouse: Shanthabai Chandrabhushana Nayak Bahadur Desai
- Family: Nagaraj Desai (great grandson)

Rao Bahadur Sardar Veerabhadrappa Gunappa Desai was an Indian philanthropist, ruler of Chachadi princely state who had made significant contributions in social, religious, political, administrative, educational and literary fields. He was the 15 th Jagirdar of the Desai family. He was also a founder member of Karnatak Lingayat Education Society which was established on 11 October 1916.

== Early life ==
He was born on August 30, 1882. He faced many problems in his childhood because of which he could not get a proper education. He was the early ruler of a Desai's wade situated in Chachadi village of Saudatti taluk, Belagavi district. The wade was having an ownership over 33 villages. Even though he was not properly educated, he successfully ruled his province.

== Notable works ==
He established a primary school exclusively for girls in 1904, in order to encourage the education among girls. He also established an agricultural training school for the rural youths.

== Recognition ==
His great grandson Nagaraj Desai has set up the foundation named Sardar V G Desai Foundation Chachadi to promote Desai’s contributions.

== Awards and honours ==
He was awarded with the titles Rao Bahadur and Sardar from the British government for his social work.
