= Ballari =

City in Karnataka, India

- City
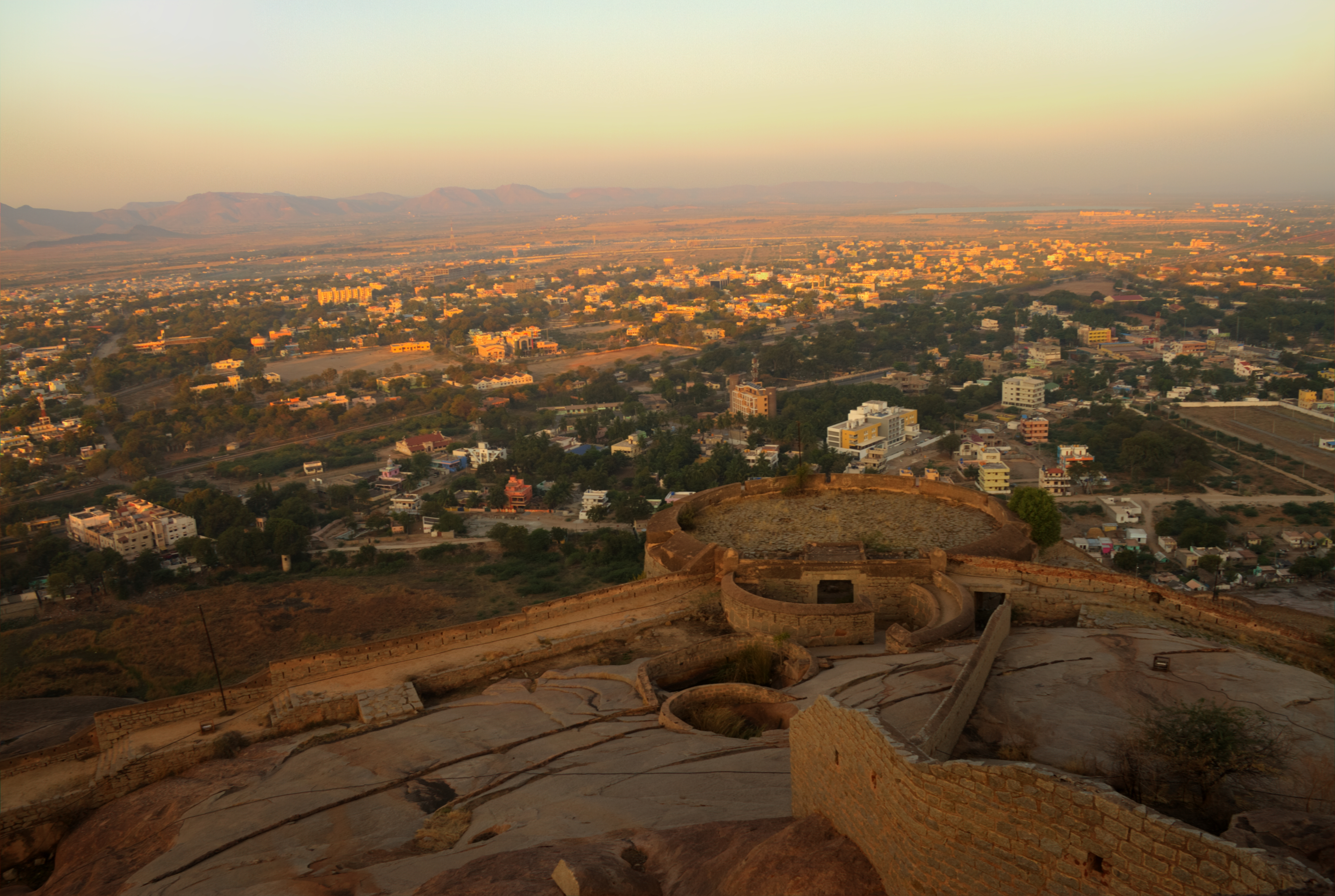
- Ballari city
- Interactive map of Ballari
- Coordinates: 15°08′22.8″N 76°55′07.2″E
- Country: India
- State: Karnataka
- District: Ballari

Government
  - Type: Municipal Corporation
  - Body: Ballari City Corporation
  - Mayor: P. Gadeppa
  - Commissioner: G Khaleel Sab

Area
  - City: 167.38 km^{2} (64.63 sq mi)
  - Rural: 1,609.68 km^{2} (621.50 sq mi)
- Elevation: 485 m (1,591 ft)

Population (2011)
  - City: 410,445
  - Rank: 95th (India); 5th (Karnataka)
  - Density: 2,452.2/km^{2} (6,351.1/sq mi)
  - Rural: 360,484
- Demonym: Ballarians
- Time zone: UTC+05:30 (IST)
- Postal Index Number: 583101, 583102, 583103, 583104, 583105, 583152
- Telephone code: (+91)8392
- ISO 3166 code: IN-KA
- Vehicle registration: KA-34
- Official language: Kannada
- Sex ratio: 1.04 ♂/♀
- Literacy: 79%
- Website: ballaricity.mrc.gov.in

Ballari (Kannada: [bɐɭːaːri], formerly Bellary) is a city in the Ballari district in state of Karnataka, India.

Ballari houses many steel plants such as JSW Vijayanagar, one of the largest in Asia. Ballari district is also known as the 'Steel city of South India'. Ballari is also the headquarters for Karnataka Gramina Bank which almost has more than 1100 + branches in Karnataka.

== History ==
Core area of Western Chalukya monuments, roughly corresponding to Sindavadi-1000

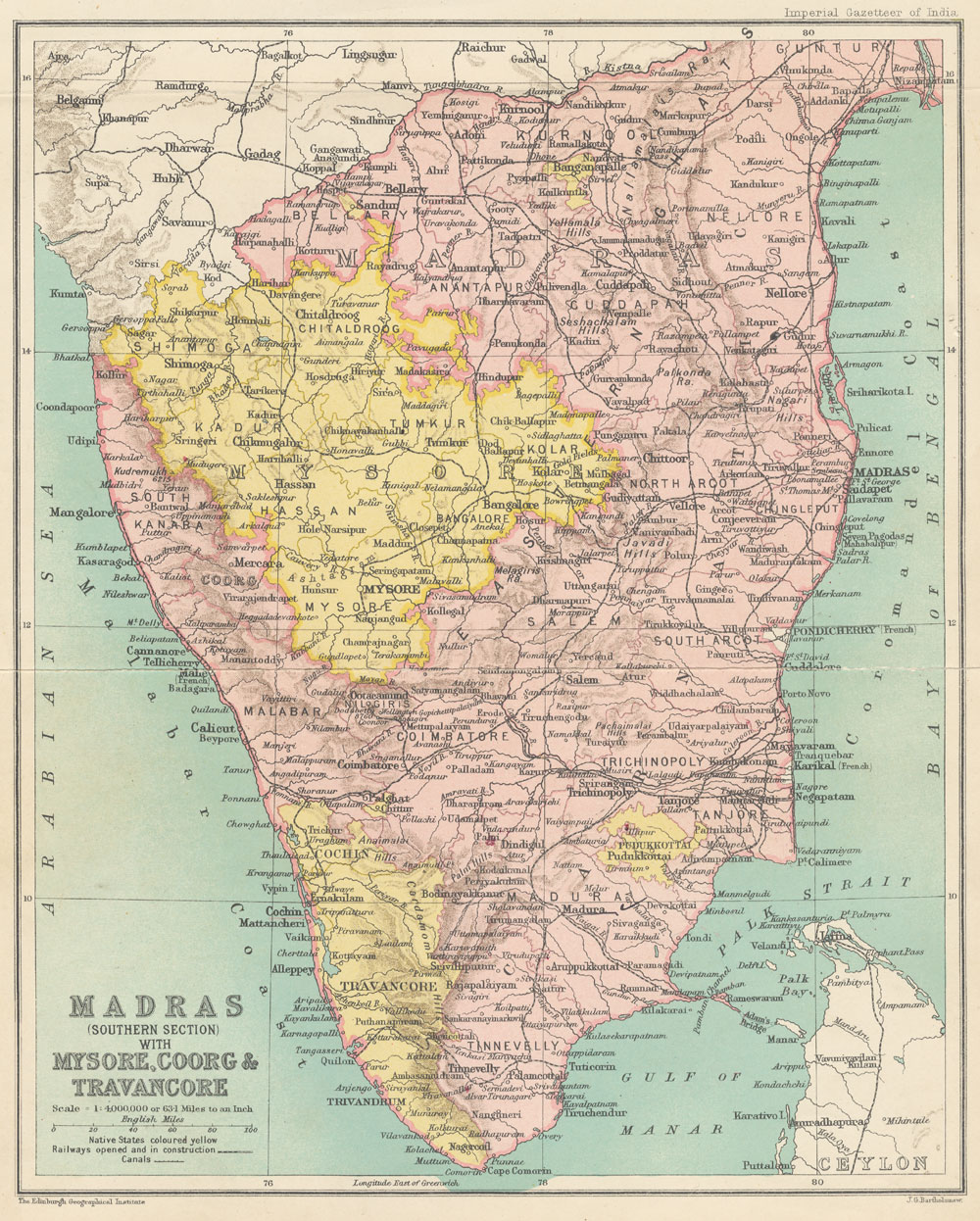
Madras province (South), 1909 showing Ballari

Ballari was a part of Rayalaseema (Ceded Districts) which was part of Madras Presidency till 1 November 1956.

The Ballari city municipal council was upgraded to a city corporation in 2004.

The Union Ministry of Home Affairs of the Government of India approved a proposal to rename the city in October 2014 and Bellary was renamed to "Ballari" on 1 November 2014.

== Geography ==
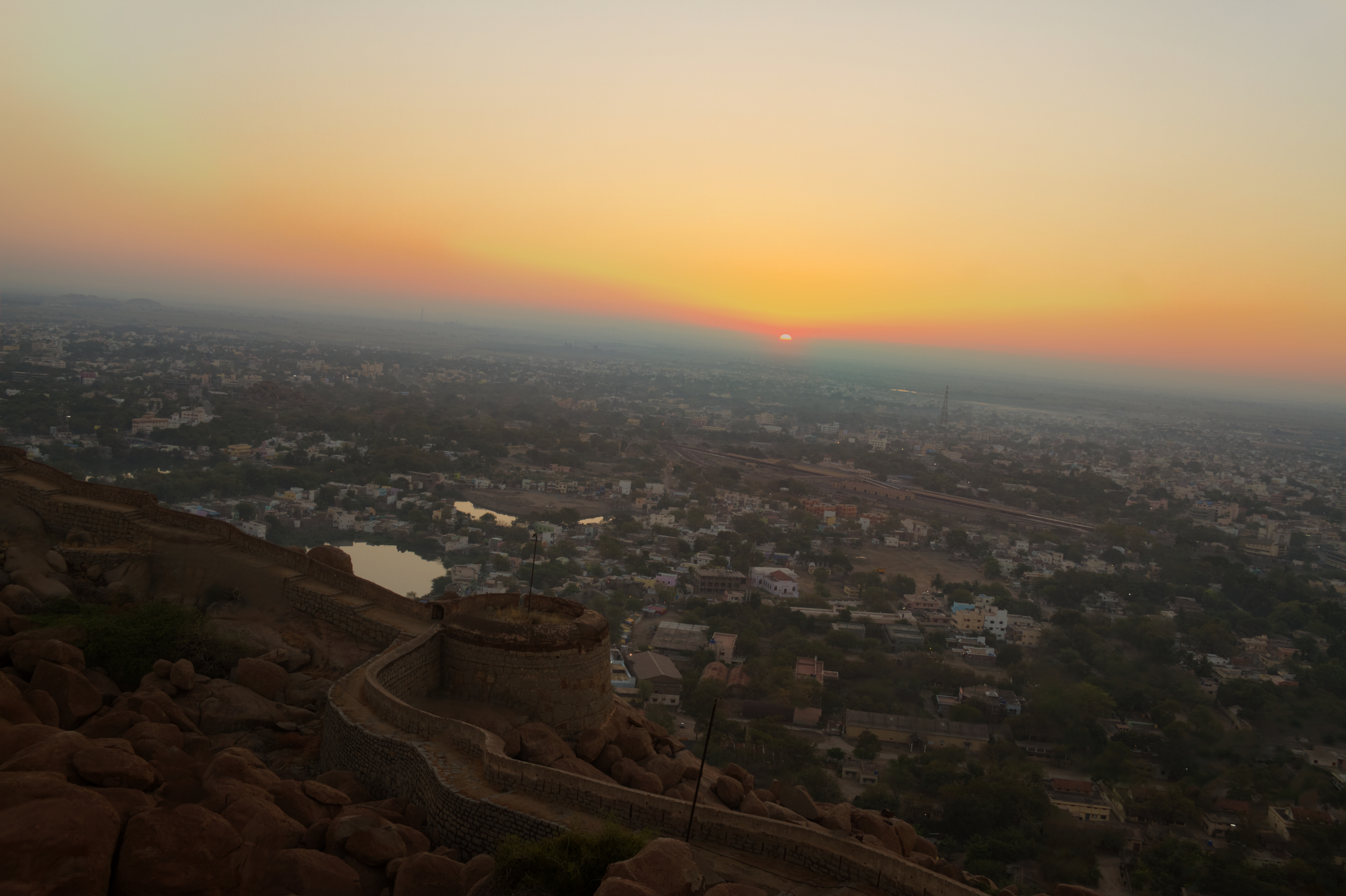
Ballari Fort

Ballari is located at 15.15°N 76.93°E. The city stands in the midst of a wide, level plain of black cotton soil.Granite rocks and hills form a prominent feature of Ballari. The city is spread mainly around two hills of granite composition, the Ballari Hill and the Kumbara Gudda.

Ballari Hill has a circumference of nearly 2 miles (3.2 km) and a height of 480 feet (150 m). The length of this rock from north-east to south-west is about 1,150 ft (350 m). To the east and south lies an irregular heap of boulders, to the west there is an unbroken monolith, and the north is walled by bare, rugged ridges.

Kumbara Gudda looks like the profile of a human face from the south-east. It is also known as Face Hill.

=== Climate ===
The climate is a hot semi arid one (BSh), primarily due to the rain shadow effect of the Western Ghats, but monsoons still influence the weather here, with light rain throughout the year, and a slight increase during the summer and autumn.

Climate data for Bellary (1981–2010, extremes 1901–2012)
Month	Jan	Feb	Mar	Apr	May	Jun	Jul	Aug	Sep	Oct	Nov	Dec	Year
Record high °C (°F)	37.6 (99.7)	40.5 (104.9)	43.0 (109.4)	45.4 (113.7)	44.6 (112.3)	44.7 (112.5)	39.5 (103.1)	39.0 (102.2)	38.4 (101.1)	39.0 (102.2)	38.4 (101.1)	35.6 (96.1)	44.7 (112.5)
Mean daily maximum °C (°F)	31.4 (88.5)	34.4 (93.9)	38.1 (100.6)	40.4 (104.7)	39.6 (103.3)	35.3 (95.5)	32.7 (90.9)	31.9 (89.4)	32.3 (90.1)	31.8 (89.2)	30.8 (87.4)	30.2 (86.4)	34.1 (93.4)
Mean daily minimum °C (°F)	15.6 (60.1)	18.1 (64.6)	21.1 (70.0)	23.9 (75.0)	24.4 (75.9)	23.3 (73.9)	23.0 (73.4)	22.7 (72.9)	21.9 (71.4)	20.9 (69.6)	18.3 (64.9)	15.6 (60.1)	20.7 (69.3)
Record low °C (°F)	7.0 (44.6)	8.5 (47.3)	10.0 (50.0)	13.0 (55.4)	14.5 (58.1)	14.8 (58.6)	15.5 (59.9)	15.0 (59.0)	15.0 (59.0)	12.5 (54.5)	8.4 (47.1)	8.0 (46.4)	7.0 (44.6)
Average rainfall mm (inches)	2.9 (0.11)	2.3 (0.09)	6.0 (0.24)	17.2 (0.68)	54.3 (2.14)	59.2 (2.33)	42.6 (1.68)	70.0 (2.76)	111.0 (4.37)	89.0 (3.50)	39.5 (1.56)	5.5 (0.22)	499.5 (19.67)
Average rainy days	0.5	0.2	0.6	1.5	3.4	3.8	3.8	4.7	5.4	5.8	2.4	0.5	32.7
Average relative humidity (%) (at 17:30 IST)	43	37	30	29	34	50	56	58	58	62	56	50	47
Source: India Meteorological Department

== Demographics ==
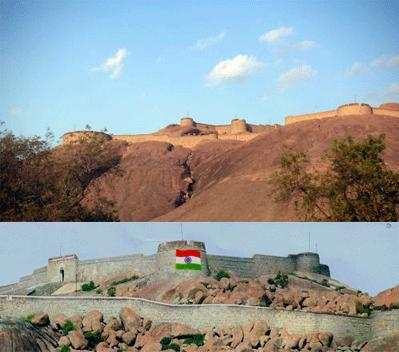
Ballari Fort

Historical population
Year	Pop.	±%
1931	47,573	—
1941	56,148	+18.0%
1951	70,332	+25.3%
1961	85,673	+21.8%
1971	125,183	+46.1%
1981	201,579	+61.0%
1991	245,391	+21.7%
2001	316,766	+29.1%
2011	410,445	+29.6%

Religions in Ballari City (2011)
Religion	Percent
Hinduism	70.33%
Islam	26.53%
Christianity	1.71%
Jainism	0.79%
Other or not stated	0.65%

According to the 2011 Census of India, the urban population of Ballari was 410,445; of whom 206,149 were male and 204,296 female. 280,610 of the population were literate and 52,413 of the population were under 7 years of age. The population in 2001 was recorded as 316,766.

=== Languages ===
Languages of Ballari City (2011)
1. Kannada (42.1%)
2. Telugu (25.0%)
3. Urdu (24.4%)
4. Hindi (3.04%)
5. Marathi (1.75%)
6. Tamil (1.69%)
7. Marwari (0.85%)
8. Lambadi (0.50%)

Kannada is the largest language, spoken by 42.06% of the population. Telugu is the second-largest, spoken by 25.03%, and Urdu 24.35%. 3.04% of the population spoke Hindi, 1.75% Marathi, 1.69% Tamil, 0.85% Marwari and 0.50% Lambadi.

== Economy ==
=== Industries ===
==== Textiles and garments ====
- Cotton processing

With cotton being one of the major agricultural crops around Ballari historically, the city has had a thriving cotton processing industry in the form of ginning, spinning and weaving plants. The earliest steam cotton-spinning mill was established in 1894, which by 1901 had 17,800 spindles, and employed 520 hands.
The city continues to thrive in this sector with one spinning mill and numerous cotton ginning and pressing mills, hand looms and power looms.

- Garment manufacture

Ballari has a historic garment industry dating back to the First World War period, when the Marathi speaking "Darji" (tailor) community with its native skills in tailoring migrated from the current Maharashtra region to stitch uniforms for the soldiers of the colonial British Indian Army stationed at Ballari. After the war, the community switched to making uniforms for school children, and gradually the uniforms made here became popular all over the country.
Currently, Ballari is well known for its branded and unbranded denim garments, with brands like Point Blank, Walker, Dragonfly and Podium being successfully marketed nationally and internationally. There are about 260 denim garment units in Ballari with nearly 3000 families working in these units.

== Transport ==
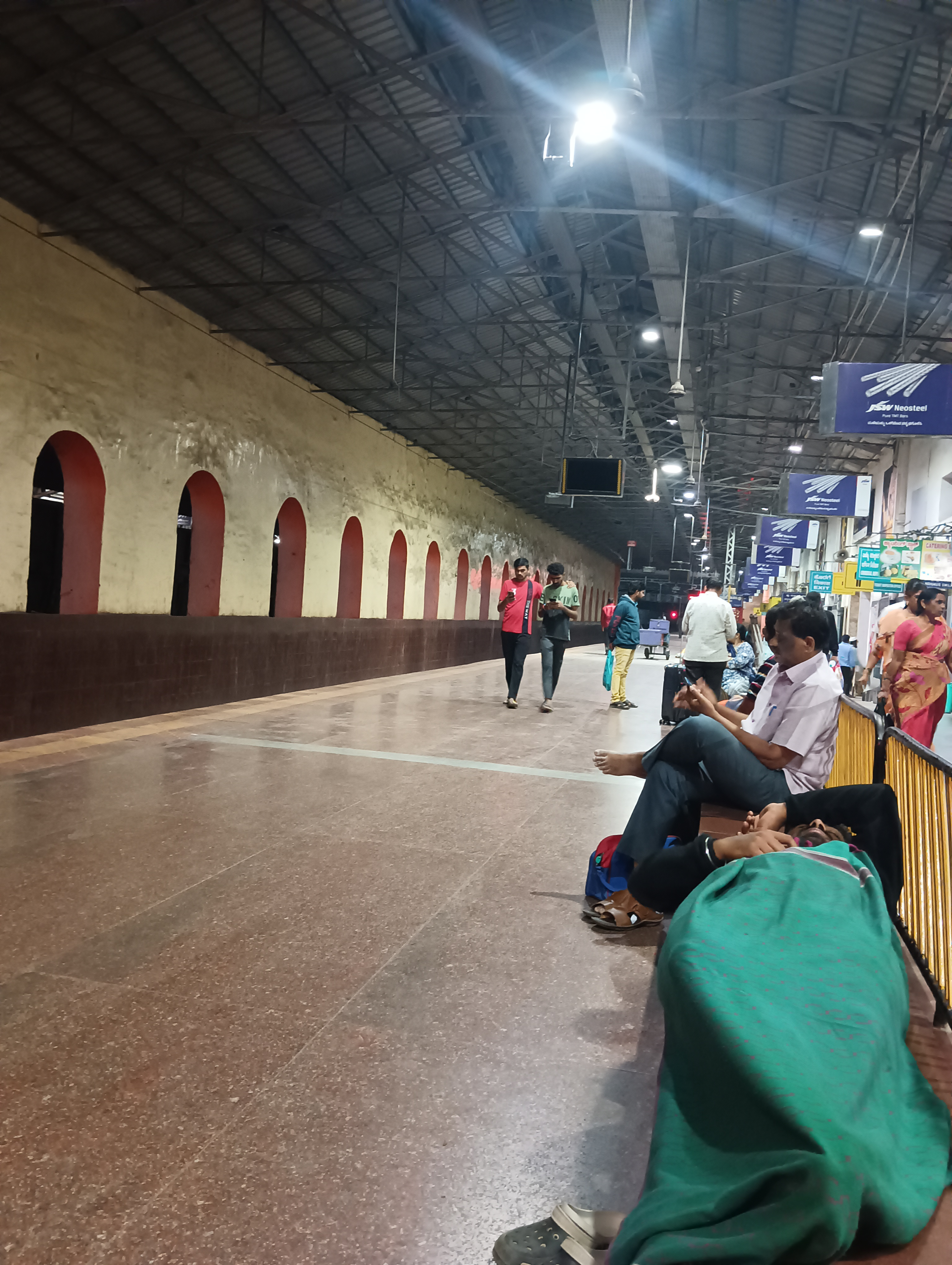
Ballari railway station platform 1

=== Roadways ===
National Highway 67 (India), National Highway 150A (India), State Highway 128 and State Highway 132 pass through the city.

=== Rail ===
There is Ballari Junction railway station on the Guntakal–Vasco da Gama section.

=== Air ===
The closest functional commercial airport is Jindal Vijaynagar Airport.

== Notable people ==
See Category:People from Ballari

- Kolur Basavanagoud – Politician, Educationist, and Industrialist. He served as MP in 13th Lok Sabha from Ballari Lok Sabha constituency.
- Basavarajeshwari – Politician and Industrialist
- Ravi Belagere – Actor, writer, novelist, journalist, publisher of the Hai Bengaluru Tabloid
- Naveen Chandra – Actor in Telugu film industry
- Manjula Chellur −1st Woman Chief Justice of Calcutta High Court
- Nagarur Gopinath – One of the pioneers of cardiothoracic surgery in India, credited with the first successful performance of open heart surgery in India in 1962. Recipient of Padma Shri (1974) and Dr. B. C. Roy Award (1978)
- Jayanthi – cinema actress, born in Ballari
- K. C. Kondaiah – Politician and industrialist
- Arcot Ranganatha Mudaliar – Former Deputy Collector of Ballari, politician and theosophist. He served as the Minister of Public Health and Excise for the Madras Presidency from 1926 to 1928.
- A. Sabhapathy Mudaliar – Philanthropist; The Women & Children's Hospital or The District Hospital was initially named after him, following his donation of land and building to the hospital.
- B Nagendra - Youth Welfare and Sports Minister of Karnataka
- Bellary Raghava (1880–1946) – Noted dramatist. The Raghava Kala Mandir auditorium in Ballari is named after him
- Suparna Rajaram – Distinguished Professor of Psychology at Stony Brook University
- Dharmavaram Ramakrishnamacharyulu (1853–1912) – Noted dramatist
- Bhargavi Rao – a Kannada-Telugu translator, winner of the prestigious Kendra Sahitya Academy award
- Kolachalam Srinivasa Rao (1854–1919) – Noted dramatist
- Gali Janardhan Reddy – Former minister and district in charge. He is one of the richest politicians in India
- B Sriramulu - Ex Minister of Health and Family Welfare of Karnataka
- Tekur Subramanyam – Indian Freedom Fighter, First post-independence MP of Ballari, elected thrice in a row since 1952, political secretary to Prime Minister Jawaharlal Nehru
- Ibrahim B. Syed – Indo-American Radiologist
- Allum Veerabhadrappa - former minister, Government of Karnataka
