= Gavan Kola, Gatab =

Village in Mazandaran province, Iran

Gavan Kola Persian: گاوان كلا
- Village
- Location within Iran
- Coordinates: 36°23′40″N 52°37′07″E
- Country: Iran
- Province: Mazandaran
- County: Babol
- District: Gatab
- Rural District: Gatab-e Jonubi

Population (2016)
  - Total: 1,065
- Time zone: UTC+3:30 (IRST)

Gavan Kola (Persian: گاوان كلا) (Note: Also romanized as Gāvān Kolā; also known as Gāvzan Kolā) is a village in Gatab-e Jonubi Rural District of Gatab District in Babol County, Mazandaran province, Iran.

== Demographics ==
=== Population ===
At the time of the 2006 National Census, the village's population was 1,075 in 236 households. The following census in 2011 counted 1,110 people in 280 households. The 2016 census measured the population of the village as 1,065 people in 334 households.
