= Sad Song =

Sad Song may refer to different pieces of music:

- Songs about sadness
- Sad Song (EP), a 2024 EP by South Korean boy band P1Harmony, or the title track
- "Sad Song" (Blake Lewis song), 2009
- "Sad Song" (The Cars song), 2011
- "Sad Song" (Thrill Pill song), 2019
- "Sad Song" by Lou Reed on the 1973 album Berlin
- "Sad Song" by Paul Williams on the 1974 album A Little Bit of Love
- "Sad Song" by Screaming Jets on the 1994 album The Screaming Jets
- "Sad Song" by David Byrne on the 1994 album David Byrne
- "Sad Song" by Oasis from vinyl and Japanese editions of their 1994 album Definitely Maybe
- "Sad Song" by Krayzie Bone on the 1999 album Thug Mentality 1999
- "Sad Song" by Cat Power on the 2004 album Speaking for Trees
- "Sad Song" by Au Revoir Simone on the 2007 album The Bird of Music
- "Sad Song" by September on the 2007 album Dancing Shoes
- "Sad Song" by Christina Perri from her 2011 debut album, Lovestrong
- "Sad Song" by We the Kings on the 2013 album Somewhere Somehow
- "Fa-Fa-Fa-Fa-Fa (Sad Song)" by Otis Redding (1966)

== See also ==
- "Sad Songs (Say So Much)" by Elton John, 1984
- "There'll Be Sad Songs (To Make You Cry)" by Billy Ocean, 1986
- "Sad Songs" by Tones and I from Welcome to the Madhouse, 2021
- Sad (disambiguation)#Music, for songs named "Sad"
