= Kelagar Mahalleh, Gatab =

Village in Mazandaran province, Iran

Kelagar Mahalleh Persian: كلاگرمحله
- Village
- Location within Iran
- Coordinates: 36°28′18″N 52°39′41″E
- Country: Iran
- Province: Mazandaran
- County: Babol
- District: Gatab
- Rural District: Gatab-e Shomali

Population (2016)
  - Total: 1,211
- Time zone: UTC+3:30 (IRST)

Kelagar Mahalleh (Persian: كلاگرمحله) (Note: Also romanized as Kelāgar Maḩalleh,) is a village in Gatab-e Shomali Rural District (Note: Formerly Gatab Rural District) of Gatab District in Babol County, Mazandaran province, Iran.

== Demographics ==
=== Population ===
At the time of the 2006 National Census, the village's population was 1,335 in 356 households. The following census in 2011 counted 1,307 people in 387 households. The 2016 census measured the population of the village as 1,211 people in 404 households.
