= Seeding =

The term seeding and related terms such as seeded are used in several different contexts:

- Sowing, planting seeds in a place or on an object
- Cloud seeding, manipulating cloud formations
- Seeding (computing), a concept in computing and peer-to-peer file sharing
- Seeding (fluid dynamics), a process done while attempting to evaluate the flow of a fluid
- Seeding (sex act), a reference to internal ejaculation inside a sexual partner
- Seeding (sports), setting up and/or adjusting a tournament bracket
- Planet seeding, or panspermia, a theory dealing with propagation of simple lifeforms to inhabit planets
- A seeding machine, a mechanical device often used in agricultural work
- A seeding trial, an event done during a business' marketing research
- Database seeding, populating a database with an initial set of data

== See also ==
- Seed (disambiguation)
- Seedling (disambiguation)
- Super-seeding algorithm
