= Bala Mir Kola =

Bala Mir Kola بالاميركلا
- Village
- Location within Iran
- Coordinates: 36°24′30″N 52°37′09″E
- Country: Iran
- Province: Mazandaran
- County: Babol
- Bakhsh: Gatab
- Rural District: Gatab-e Jonubi

Population (2016)
  - Total: 465
- Time zone: UTC+3:30 (IRST)

Bala Mir Kola (Persian: بالاميركلا, also Romanized as Bālā Mīr Kolā) is a village in Gatab-e Jonubi Rural District, Gatab District, Babol County, Mazandaran Province, Iran.

At the time of the 2006 National Census, the village's population was 425 in 107 households. The following census in 2011 counted 416 people in 133 households. The 2016 census measured the population of the village as 465 people in 169 households.
