= Gatab-e Jonubi Rural District =

Rural district in Mazandaran province, Iran

Gatab-e Jonubi Rural District Persian: دهستان گتاب جنوبي
- Rural District
- Location within Iran
- Coordinates: 36°24′N 52°38′E
- Country: Iran
- Province: Mazandaran
- County: Babol
- District: Gatab
- Established: 2000
- Capital: Bala Marzbal

Population (2016)
  - Total: 15,030
- Time zone: UTC+3:30 (IRST)

Gatab-e Jonubi Rural District (Persian: دهستان گتاب جنوبي) is in Gatab District of Babol County, Mazandaran province, Iran. Its capital is the village of Bala Marzbal.

== Demographics ==
=== Population ===
At the time of the 2006 National Census, the rural district's population was 14,743 in 3,532 households. There were 14,955 inhabitants in 4,387 households at the following census of 2011. The 2016 census measured the population of the rural district as 15,030 in 4,917 households. The most populous of its 20 villages was Ahangar Kola, with 3,500 people.

=== Other villages in the rural district ===
- Abu ol Hasan Kola
- Afra Kati va Lu Kola
- Bala Marznak
- Bala Mir Kola
- Bala Seyyed Kola
- Bil Pey-e Abu ol Hasan Kola
- Chub Bast
- Gavan Kola
- Kartich Kola
- Kharrat Kola
- Mashhad Sara
- Otaq Sara
- Pain Marzbal
- Pain Seyyed Kola
- Sar Hammam-e Abu ol Hasan
- Valu Kola
- Yur Mahalleh
