= Pain Seyyed Kola =

Pain Seyyed Kola پايين سيدكلا
- Village
- Location within Iran
- Coordinates: 36°37′00″N 52°39′00″E
- Country: Iran
- Province: Mazandaran
- County: Babol
- Bakhsh: Gatab
- Rural District: Gatab-e Jonubi

Population (2016)
  - Total: 399
- Time zone: UTC+3:30 (IRST)

Pain Seyyed Kola (Persian: پايين سيدكلا, also Romanized as Pā’īn Seyyed Kolā; also known as Seyyed Kolā-ye Pā’īn) is a village in Gatab-e Jonubi Rural District, Gatab District, Babol County, Mazandaran Province, Iran.

At the time of the 2006 National Census, the village's population was 366 in 91 households. The following census in 2011 counted 362 people in 105 households. The 2016 census measured the population of the village as 399 people in 137 households.
