= SADS =

SADS can refer to:

== Biology and medicine ==
- Schedule for Affective Disorders and Schizophrenia, a psychiatric diagnosis interview collection
- Sudden arrhythmic death syndrome, a heart-related medical condition
- Swine acute diarrhea syndrome coronavirus (SADS-CoV), a pig-killing bat virus

== Other uses ==
- Sads (band), a Japanese punk/rock music group
- SA.DS, silver acetylide double salt with silver nitrate, a primary explosive
- Synthetic air data system, an aircraft feature

== See also ==
- SAD (disambiguation)
