= Darzikola-ye Akhundi-ye Bala =

Village in Mazandaran province, Iran

Darzikola-ye Akhundi-ye Bala Persian: درزی کلا اخوندی بالا
- Village
- Location within Iran
- Coordinates: 36°30′22″N 52°39′54″E
- Country: Iran
- Province: Mazandaran
- County: Babol
- District: Gatab
- Rural District: Gatab-e Shomali

Population (2016)
  - Total: 2,036
- Time zone: UTC+3:30 (IRST)

Darzikola-ye Akhundi-ye Bala (Persian: درزی کلااخوندی بالا) (Note: Also romanized as Darzīkolā-ye Ākhūndī-ye Bālā; also known as Darzīkolā-ye Ākhūndī) is a village in Gatab-e Shomali Rural District (Note: Formerly Gatab Rural District) of Gatab District in Babol County, Mazandaran province, Iran.

== Demographics ==
=== Population ===
At the time of the 2006 National Census, the village's population was 1,713 in 444 households. The following census in 2011 counted 1,813 people in 546 households. The 2016 census measured the population of the village as 2,036 people in 646 households.
