= Yur Mahalleh, Babol =

Yur Mahalleh يورمحله
- Village
- Location within Iran
- Coordinates: 36°24′26″N 52°41′37″E
- Country: Iran
- Province: Mazandaran
- County: Babol
- Bakhsh: Gatab
- Rural District: Gatab-e Jonubi

Population (2016)
  - Total: 449
- Time zone: UTC+3:30 (IRST)

Yur Mahalleh (Persian: يورمحله, also Romanized as Yūr Maḩalleh) is a village in Gatab-e Jonubi Rural District, Gatab District, Babol County, Mazandaran Province, Iran.

At the time of the 2006 National Census, the village's population was 420 in 101 households. The following census in 2011 counted 456 people in 137 households. The 2016 census measured the population of the village as 449 people in 154 households.
