= A. Sabhapathy Mudaliar =

Indian politician and philanthropist

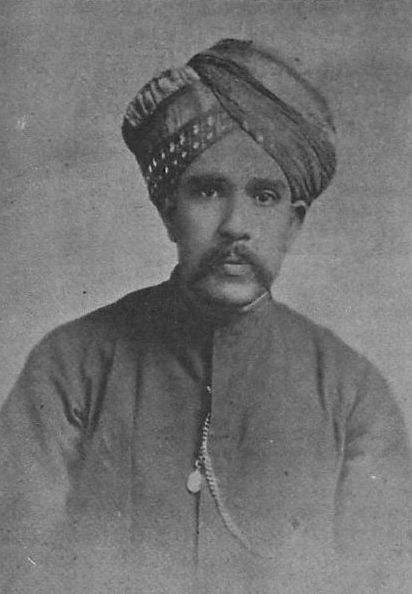
- Born: 1838
- Died: October 29, 1903 (aged 65); Royapettah, Madras, India
- Known for: Politician, philanthropist

Rai Bahadur A. Sabhapathy Mudaliar (1838 – 29 October 1903) was a Philanthropist and politician from Bellary, India. The Women & Children's Hospital or The District Hospital in Bellary was initially named after him, following his donation of land and building to the hospital. A street in the Brucepet area in Bellary is named after him.

He was a member of the Bellary Municipal Council for more than 20 years during the late 19th and early 20th centuries, during nine of which he was its Chairman. On one occasion in 1902, his election as the Chairman of the Bellary Municipal Council was legally vetoed by the Government of Madras without explanation, despite he being elected by the votes of 13 out of 17 of the Council's members. This issue was raised in the House of Commons by William Caine, the MP for Camborne at the time.
