= Gatab =

City in Mazandaran province, Iran

Gatab Persian: گتاب
- City
- Location within Iran
- Coordinates: 36°25′53″N 52°39′19″E
- Country: Iran
- Province: Mazandaran
- County: Babol
- District: Gatab
- Established: 2005

Population (2016)
  - Total: 7,374
- Time zone: UTC+3:30 (IRST)

Gatab (Persian: گتاب) (Note: Also romanized as Gatāb; formerly known as Pain Gatab (پائین گتاب), also romanized as Pā’īn Gatāb) is a city in, and the capital of, Gatab District in Babol County, Mazandaran province, Iran. It also serves as the administrative center for Gatab-e Shomali Rural District. (Note: Formerly Gatab Rural District) The village of Pain Gatab (پائین گتاب), after merging with the village of Bala Gatab (بالا گتاب), was renamed the city of Gatab in 2005.

== Demographics ==
=== Population ===
At the time of the 2006 National Census, the city's population was 6,956 in 1,744 households. The following census in 2011 counted 7,242 people in 2,084 households. The 2016 census measured the population of the city as 7,374 people in 2,340 households.
