= Bala Marznak =

Village in Mazandaran province, Iran

Bala Marznak Persian: بالامرزناك
- Village
- Location within Iran
- Coordinates: 36°22′36″N 52°40′59″E
- Country: Iran
- Province: Mazandaran
- County: Babol
- District: Gatab
- Rural District: Gatab-e Jonubi

Population (2016)
  - Total: 1,052
- Time zone: UTC+3:30 (IRST)

Bala Marznak (Persian: بالامرزناك) (Note: Also romanized as Bālā Marznāk) is a village in Gatab-e Jonubi Rural District of Gatab District in Babol County, Mazandaran province, Iran.

== Demographics ==
=== Population ===
At the time of the 2006 National Census, the village's population was 886 in 220 households. The following census in 2011 counted 960 people in 306 households. The 2016 census measured the population of the village as 1,052 people in 338 households.
