= Basavarajeshwari =

Indian politician

Basavarajeshwari Jahagirdar
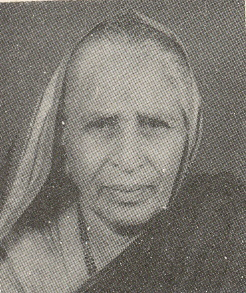

Member of the Lok Sabha
- In office 1984–1996
- Preceded by: R. Y. Ghorpade
- Succeeded by: K. C. Kondaiah
- Constituency: Bellary

Minister of State for Women and Child Development
- In office 1994–1996
- Constituency: Bellary

Personal details
- Born: Basavarajeshwari Jahagirdar; 17 February 1923 Hanumapura, Rayagada, Bellary, Madras Presidency, British India
- Died: 19 February 2008 (aged 85) Ballari, Karnataka, India
- Party: Bharatiya Janata Party (2004–2008)
- Other political affiliations: Indian National Congress (1954–2004)
- Spouse: Sharana Basavaraj (m. 1948)
- Children: 1
- Profession: Agriculturist, Educationist, Industrialist and Social worker

Basavarajeshwari Jahagirdar (17 February 1923 – 19 February 2008) was an Indian politician. She was three-time Member of Parliament representing the Bellary in Lok Sabha, the lower house of the Indian Parliament. She also served as Minister of State for Women and Child Development from 1991 to 1996.

== Early life and background ==
Basavarajeswari was born on 17 February 1923 in Hanumapura, a village in Bellary district's Rayagada taluk of the erstwhile Madras Presidency of British India (in present-day Karnataka). She was born into a family of zamindars and was the eldest of eight children of Veerareddy and Timmamma. She completed her education at Government Girls High School in Bellary, before finishing her education upon completion of pre-university course.

== Personal life ==
Basava Rajeswari married Sharana Basavaraj on 22 May 1948 and the couple has four sons and four daughters.

== Positions held ==
- Member of All India Congress Committee (AICC) for two terms.
- Secretary of District Congress Committee, Raichur.

#	From	To	Position
	1957	1977	Member of Karnataka Legislative Assembly.: Deputy Minister, Social Welfare and Minor Irrigation, Karnataka (for about 5 Years).
	1977	1984	Member of Karnataka Legislative Council.: Chairman of Karnataka Legislative Council in 1980 (for about 3 Years).
	1984	1989	Member of Parliament - 8th Lok Sabha from Bellary.: Member of Consultative Committee, Steel and Mines (for 5 Years).; Member of Panel of Chairmen in 8th Lok Sabha.; Member of House Committee (1986 to 1989).
	1989	1991	Member of Parliament - 9th Lok Sabha from Bellary.
	1991	1996	Member of Parliament - 10th Lok Sabha from Bellary.

== Political career ==
Ms. Basavarajeshwari, whose political career lasted 40 years, was the Union Minister of State for Women and Child Development in the P.V. Narasimha Rao Ministry. She also served as a Deputy Minister between 1962 and 1967 and was a member of the Karnataka Legislative Council for one term.

She won the Bellary Lok Sabha seat three times in a row. She began her career as a Member of the Legislative Assembly in 1957 from Lingasugur in Raichur district, and was re-elected for the second term when she held the post of Deputy Minister for five years. She was later elected as the Member of the Legislative Council (1977–84).

She won the Bellary Lok Sabha seat thrice in 1984, 1989 and 1991 and was inducted into the P.V. Narasimha Rao Ministry. As the Union Minister, Ms. Basavarajeshwari represented the country at the World Women's Conference held at Beijing in China.

She kept a low profile after she was denied the Congress ticket to contest in the Lok Sabha elections from Bellary in 1996 and floated a trust, for which she was the chairperson. It started several educational institutions, including an engineering college, schools, a polytechnic and an ITI.

In 2004, Ms. Basavarajeshwari joined the Bharatiya Janata Party and campaigned for the party not only in Bellary but also in the neighbouring districts.

Karnataka Pradesh krishik Samaja building at Bengaluru hudson circle is named in her honour

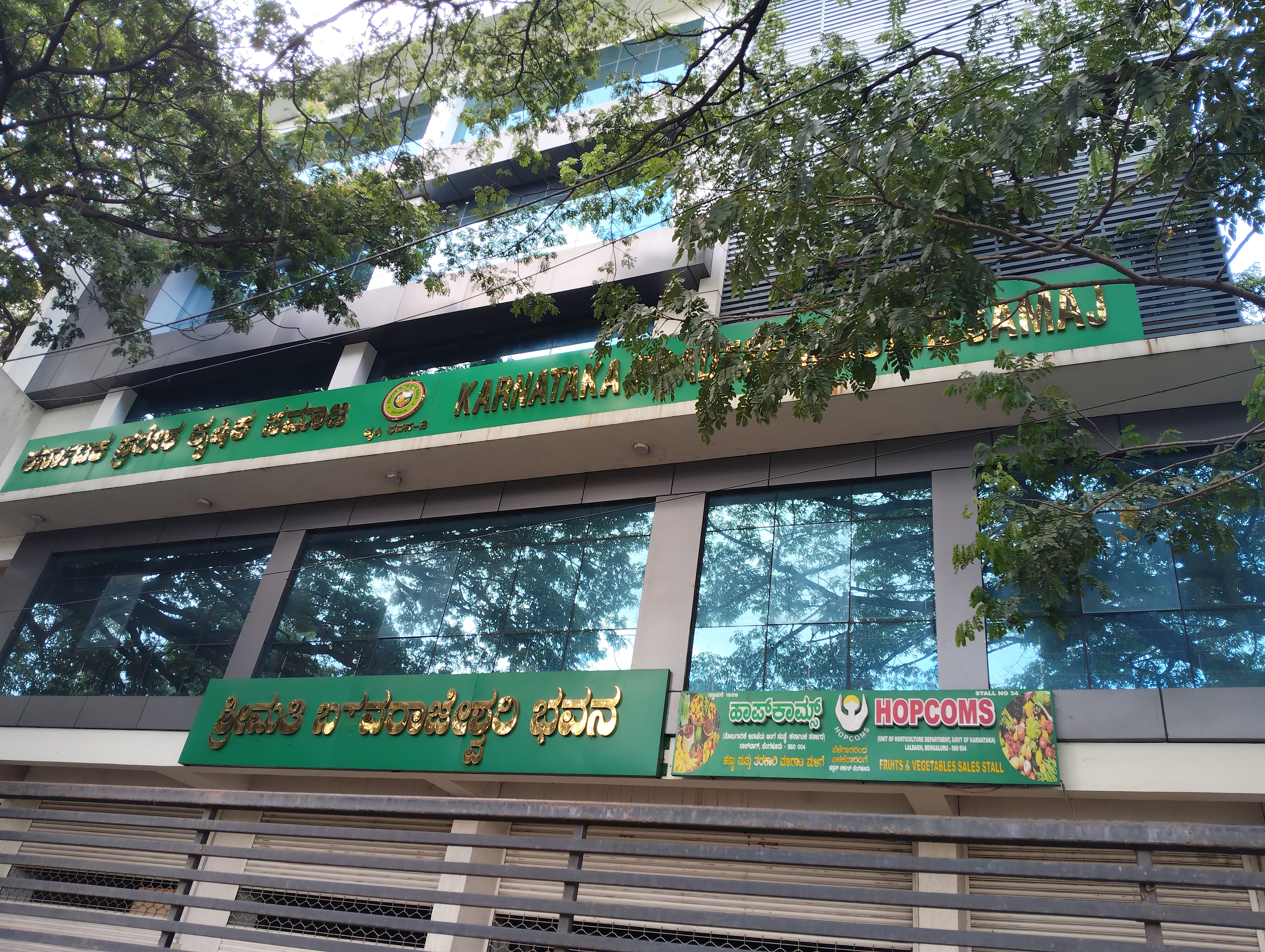
basavarajeshwari Bhavan building karnataka pradesha krushika samaaja hudson circle bengaluru
