= Sead Gorani =

Kosovar footballer

Personal information
- Full name: Sead Gorani
- Date of birth: 17 January 1977 (age 49)
- Place of birth: Prizren, SR Serbia, SFR Yugoslavia
- Position: Midfielder

Youth career
- 1986–1994: Liria Prizren

Senior career*
| Years | Team | Apps | (Gls) |
| 1994–1995 | Zeytinburnuspor | 0 | (0) |
| 1995–1998 | Ibar Rožaje | | |
| 1998–2001 | Železnik | 5 | (0) |
| 2001-2002 | Neftokhimik Burgas | 4 | (0) |
| 2003–2004 | Pobeda Prilep | | |
| 2005–2008 | Liria Prizren | | |

Managerial career
- 2006–: Winner Prizren (youth)
- * Club domestic league appearances and goals

Sead Gorani (born 17 January 1977) is a Kosovar footballer who played in clubs from FR Yugoslavia, Turkey, Bulgaria, Macedonia and Kosovo. After retiring, he became in charge, along his father, of a football school Winner in his hometown Prizren.

== Club career ==
Born in Prizren, Socialist Autonomous Province of Kosovo, SR Serbia, SFR Yugoslavia (modern Kosovo), Gorani started playing in local club Liria Prizren at age of 9, and he spent his entire youth career there. He then moved abroad and played one season as left-winger with Zeytinburnuspor, playing at time in the Turkish Süper Lig. At age of 18 he, returned to FR Yugoslavia, and signed with Montenegrin side FK Ibar Rožaje playing back then in the Second League of FR Yugoslavia.

In summer 1998, coming from FK Ibar, he moved to Serbian and Yugoslav capital Belgrade and joined FK Železnik. He played with Železnik in the 1999–2000 First League of FR Yugoslavia making four appearances and in the 2000–01 First League of FR Yugoslavia making one appearance.

After a spell with Bulgarian side PFC Naftex Burgas, he played with FK Pobeda in the 2003–04 Macedonian First Football League becoming Macedonian champion, and later, with Kosovar side KF Liria in the season 2005–06.

== Personal life ==
Sead Gorani is son of former football player and coach Šukrija Gorani, and along his father, Sead has been in charge of football school Winner in Prizren since 2006. By 2011, Sead had been retired from his playing career three years earlier as result of a cirgury he had to be submitted to, and has been coaching the youth teams at Winner five years already. On 21 June 2013, representatives of KF Liria and three local football schools, one of them being Sead Gorani representing Winner, met with representatives of the Commission for Culture, Youth and Sports in order to improve the investments in football in the city of Prizren.

== Honours ==
Pobeda

- Macedonian First League: 2003–04

Liria

- Kosovo Cup: 2007
