= CCDC47 =

Protein-coding gene in humans

Identifiers
- Aliases: CCDC47, MSTP041, GK001, coiled-coil domain containing 47, THNS
- External IDs: OMIM: 618260; MGI: 1914413; GeneCards: CCDC47

Gene location (Human)
Chr.	Chromosome 17 (human)
Band	17q23.3	Start	63,745,255 bp
Band	17q23.3	End	63,776,351 bp

Gene location (Mouse)
Chr.	Chromosome 11 (mouse)
Band	11|11 E1	Start	106,088,234 bp
Band	11|11 E1	End	106,107,170 bp
RNA expression pattern
Bgee	Human / Mouse (ortholog); Top expressed in: Achilles tendon; islet of Langerhans; rectum; right ventricle; parotid gland; mucosa of sigmoid colon; Skeletal muscle tissue of biceps brachii; gastrocnemius muscle; cartilage tissue; Skeletal muscle tissue of rectus abdominis / Top expressed in: ciliary body; retinal pigment epithelium; iris; Paneth cell; vestibular sensory epithelium; skin of external ear; seminal vesicula; pineal gland; conjunctival fornix; vestibular membrane of cochlear duct; More reference expression data
BioGPS	n/a
Gene ontology
Molecular function	calcium ion binding; protein binding; RNA binding
Cellular component	integral component of membrane; rough endoplasmic reticulum; membrane; endoplasmic reticulum
Biological process	post-embryonic development; calcium ion homeostasis; osteoblast differentiation; endoplasmic reticulum organization; ubiquitin-dependent ERAD pathway; ER overload response
Sources:Amigo / QuickGO
Orthologs
Databases	NCBI: entry; OMA: entry
Species	Human	Mouse
Entrez	57003	67163
Ensembl	ENSG00000108588	ENSMUSG00000078622
UniProt	Q96A33	Q9D024
RefSeq (mRNA)	NM_020198	NM_026009
RefSeq (protein)	NP_064583	NP_080285
Location (UCSC)	Chr 17: 63.75 – 63.78 Mb	Chr 11: 106.09 – 106.11 Mb
PubMed search
- Wikidata
View/Edit Human	View/Edit Mouse

Coiled-coil domain 47 (CCDC47) is a gene located on human chromosome 17, specifically locus 17q23.3 which encodes for the protein PAT complex subunit CCDC47. The protein itself contains coiled-coil domains, the SEEEED superfamily, a domain of unknown function (DUF1682) and a transmembrane domain. The function of the protein is unknown, but it has been proposed that CCDC47 is involved in calcium ion homeostasis and the endoplasmic reticulum overload response.

== Gene ==
The CCDC47 gene itself is located on the minus strand of human chromosome 17 and contains 13 exon splice sites and 14 distinct introns. After removal of exons, the gene is 3445 base pairs in length. No evidence for micro RNA or pseudogenes has been found. The gene does not have various isoforms, only transcript variant 1X exists.

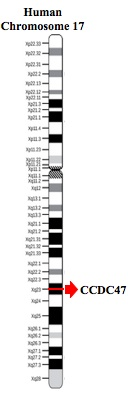
Genomic location of CCDC47 at 17q23.3

== Protein ==
=== Structure ===
The protein encoded by CCDC47 is 483 amino acids in length and contains both a signal peptide and transmembrane domain. It is rich in negatively charged amino acids such as aspartic acid and glutamic acid giving it an acidic isoelectric point of 4.56. The protein is also rich in methionine. In total, it weighs 55.9 kDal which is conserved through various orthologs. CCDC47 also contains the SEEEED superfamily and domain of unknown function 1682 (DUF1682). The SEEEED superfamily is a short, low complexity region which is composed mainly of serine. The family routinely lies on the clathrin adaptor complex 3 beta-1 subunit proteins. The exact function of DUF 1682 is unclear but one member of the family has been described as an adipocyte-specific protein.

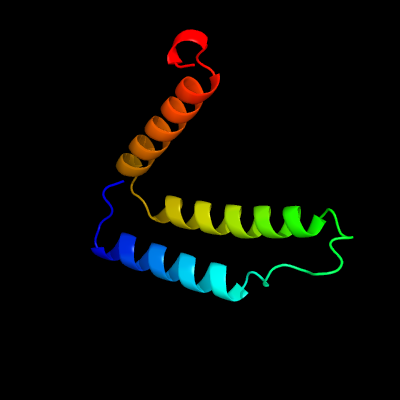
PHYRE was able to predict with 76.1% confidence the C-terminus structure of CCDC47 from amino acids 396-473. This alpha helix structure is depicted above.

There are two predicted disulfide bonds in the structure of CCDC47 at cysteines 209 to 214 and cysteines 215 to 283, respectively. The C-terminal portion of the protein is highly charged and its secondary structure is predicted to be that of an alpha helix region. This region also contains coiled coil domains which are structural motifs in which 2-7 alpha helices are coiled together and are subsequently involved in biological expression. These domains typically follow the pattern HxxHCxC where H is a hydrophobic amino acid, C is a charged amino acid and x is any amino acid. Many amino acid sequences following this pattern are seen in the C-terminal region of CCDC47 where the highest conservation through orthologs is represented.

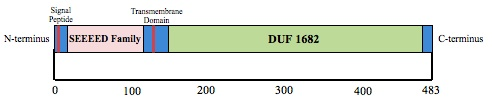
The CCDC47 protein construct, including the signal peptide, SEEEED superfamily, transmembrane domain and DUF1682.

=== Regulation and translation ===
CCDC47 is regulated by the promoter GXP43413. The promoter is 819 base pairs in length and is highly conserved in mammals. Conserved binding sites in mammals which are located on this promoter include nuclear respiratory factor 1 (NRF1), cAMP response element-binding protein (CREB), PAR bZIP family and Sp4 transcription factor. NRF1 encodes a protein which homodimerizes and activates expression of key metabolic genes. CREB binds to cAMP response elements thereby increasing or decreasing the transcription of downstream genes while PAR bZIP family is involved in the regulation of circadian rhythms. In regards to the mRNA, translation begins at base pair 337 and ends at 1728. There is a strong stem loop located in the 5' UTR from bases 289-318 which likely is involved in regulation of the mRNA due to its close proximity to the start codon.

=== Cellular distribution ===
The final protein is thought to be translated from the endoplasmic reticulum into the cytoplasm of the cell. The protein is anchored in the membrane of the ER at the transmembrane domain located from amino acid 137 to 165. The portion of the protein which extends into the cytosol is predicted to be highly phosphorylated as the protein's phosphorylation sites are conserved into the bony fish orthologs. Research has shown that CCDC47 is expressed in the response to an ER overload making this close proximity to the ER important.

=== Post translational modification ===
In addition to the high levels of phosphorylation seen in CCDC47, three sulfation sites are predicted and conserved in mammals, reptiles and birds but not in fish, amphibians or invertebrates. Five potential sumoylation sites are also seen and conserved back to the bony fish. There is no glycosylation of the protein as it is not predicted to extend into the extracellular space.

== Expression ==
Microarray tissue expression patterns from GEO were analyzed and showed that CCDC47 appears to be an ubiquitously expressed at moderate levels in many different human tissues. Although the protein is ubiquitously expressed, the highest levels of expression are seen in neuronal tissues such as the superior cervical ganglion, brain amygdala and ciliary ganglion. Elevated expression is also seen in the thyroid and CD34^{+} cells.

== Homology ==
CCDC47 has no known paralogs through text based queries, BLAST and BLAT. The gene has many orthologs extending back to invertebrates such as C. elegans and is highly conserved in mammals with a percent identity greater than 95%. CCDC47 has been sequenced in a wide taxonomy of organisms including mammals, birds, reptiles, amphibians, bony fish and invertebrates. Percent identity of human CCDC47 to a specific ortholog declines with increasing years of divergence, as expected. Homologous genes of CCDC47 are also present in mosquitos, mushrooms, arabidopsis and Asian rice. These homologs contain the same DUF1682 which is found in CCDC47.

Orthologs of CCDC47
Genus Species	Common Organism Name	Divergence from Humans (MYA)	NCBI Protein Accession Number	Sequence Identity to Humans	Sequence Length (AA)
Mus musculus	Mouse	92.3	NP_080285.2	97.90%	483
Myotis davidii	Mouse-eared Bat	94.2	XP_006776781.1	97.50%	483
Elephantulus edwardii	Elephant Shrew	98.7	XP_006886355.1	95.00%	483
Alligator mississippiensis	American Alligator	296	XP_006271625.1	91.00%	482
Falco cherrug	Saker Falcon	296	XP_005439470.1	90.10%	482
Ophiophagus hannah	King Cobra	296	ETE73955	78.90%	516
Xenopus laevis	African Clawed Frog	371.2	NP_001087058.1	78.70%	489
Danio rerio	Zebra Fish	400.1	NP_001004551.1	76.20%	486
Latimeria chalumnae	Coelacanth	414.9	XP_00599466.3	83.50%	478
Saccoglossus kowalevskii	Acorn Worm	661.2	XP_006822108	50.50%	496
Pediculus humanus corporis	Human Body Lice	782.7	XP_002424359	46.10%	447
Acyrthosiphon pison	Aphid	782.7	NP_001162147	43.50%	449
Caenorhabditis elegans	Roundworm	937.5	NP_497788.1	35.10%	442
