= Sad (disambiguation) =

Sadness is an emotion associated with loss and grief.

Sad may also refer to:

== Geography ==
- Sad, Oman, a village in Oman
- Sad, Podlaskie Voivodeship, a village in Poland
- Sad, Dnipropetrovsk Oblast, an urban settlement in Ukraine

== Language ==
- Ṣād (ﺹ), a letter of the Arabic alphabet
- Sandawe language (ISO 639 language code: sad), spoken in Tanzania
- Ṣād (surah), the thirty-eighth sura of the Qur'an

== Music ==
- Sad (album), a 1998 album by Nels Cline Trio
- "Sad!", a song by XXXTentacion from the album ?
- "Sad" (Elton John and Pnau song), on the album Good Morning to the Night
- "Sad", a song by Maroon 5 from the album Overexposed
- "Sad", a song by Bebe Rexha from the album Expectations
- "Sad", a song by Bo Burnham from the album what.
- "Sad", a song by Chico Rose featuring Afrojack
- "Sad", a song by Linkin Park on the album LP Underground 9: Demos
- "Sad", a song from the Pearl Jam album Lost Dogs

== Other ==
- #Sad!: Doonesbury in the Time of Trump, a collection of Doonesbury comic strips

== See also ==
- SAD (disambiguation)
- Sad Song (disambiguation)
- Sadness (disambiguation)
