= K. C. Kondaiah =

Indian politician (born 1950)

K.C.Kondaiah

Member of Parliament - Bellary (Lok Sabha constituency)
- In office 7 May 1996 – 6 October 1999
- Preceded by: Basavarajeshwari
- Succeeded by: Sonia Gandhi (vacated); Kolur Basavanagoud

MP of Rajya Sabha
- In office January 2000 – April 2002

Member of the Karnataka Legislative Council
- In office 6 January 2016 – 5 January 2021
- Preceded by: Mrutunjaya Jinaga
- Succeeded by: YM Satish

Personal details
- Born: 10 July 1950 (age 74); Bellary, Karnataka, India
- Political party: INC
- Spouse: K. Meenakshi
- Occupation: Industrialist

K. C. Kondaiah (born 10 July 1950) is an Indian politician and former member of the Karnataka Legislative Council, representing Bellary. He has served as a Member of Parliament in both the Lok Sabha and Rajya Sabha from Karnataka.

== Political career ==
=== Member of the Lok Sabha ===
==== 11th Lok Sabha (1996–1998) ====
Kondaiah was elected to the 11th Lok Sabha from the Bellary constituency in the 1996 general elections. During his tenure, he was a member of several parliamentary committees, including:

- Committee on Science and Technology, Environment, and Forests
- Consultative Committee for the Ministry of Human Resource Development
- Consultative Committee for the Ministry of Steel and Mines

==== 12th Lok Sabha (1998–1999) ====
Kondaiah was re-elected to the 12th Lok Sabha from Bellary constituency in the 1998 general elections. During this term, he was a member of the following committees:

- Consultative Committee for the Ministry of Defence
- House Committee, Lok Sabha
- Committee on Energy
- Z.R.U.C.C., Central and Southern Railway

==== Member of the Rajya Sabha (2000–2002) ====
Kondaiah was elected to the Rajya Sabha from Karnataka in January 2000 and served until April 2002.

==== Karnataka Legislative Council (2001–2004) ====
In June 2001, he was elected to the Karnataka Legislative Council, and he was re-elected in June 2004.
