= K. S. Veerabhadrappa =

Indian politician (born 1929)

Member of Parliament in 6th Lok Sabha
- In office 1977–1979
- Constituency: Bellary

Personal details
- Born: 29 July 1929 Gadag, Dharwar District.
- Party: Indian National Congress
- Profession: Politician, farmer, and trader

K.S. Veerabhadrappa (born 29 July 1929) is an Indian politician and Member of Parliament (MP) in 6th Lok Sabha, represented the Bellary in Lok Sabha, lower house of the Indian Parliament. He is also Director of M/S Karnataka Patrika Private Ltd., which published 'Samyukta, Karnataka' (Kannada Daily), 'Karma-veera' (Weekly), 'Kasturi' (Monthly) and 'Chitradeep' (Monthly).

== Life ==
Veerabhadrappa was born on 29 July 1929 in Gadag, Dharwar District. K. S. Sangappa was his father.

He married Smt. K. S. Rathnamma and the couple has 6 sons and 2 daughters.
