= Darzikola-ye Akhundi-ye Pain =

Village in Mazandaran province, Iran

Darzikola-ye Akhundi-ye Pain Persian: درزی کلا اخوندی پایین
- Village
- Location within Iran
- Coordinates: 36°30′29″N 52°39′49″E
- Country: Iran
- Province: Mazandaran
- County: Babol
- District: Gatab
- Rural District: Gatab-e Shomali

Population (2016)
  - Total: 2,153
- Time zone: UTC+3:30 (IRST)

Darzikola-ye Akhundi-ye Pain (Persian: درزی کلااخوندی پایین) (Note: Also romanized as Darzīkolā-ye Ākhūndī-ye Pā’īn; also known as Darzīkolā-ye Ākhūndī) is a village in Gatab-e Shomali Rural District (Note: Formerly Gatab Rural District) of Gatab District in Babol County, Mazandaran province, Iran.

== Demographics ==
=== Population ===
At the time of the 2006 National Census, the village's population was 1,912 in 503 households. The following census in 2011 counted 2,006 people in 613 households. The 2016 census measured the population of the village as 2,153 people in 727 households. It was the most populous village in its rural district.
