= Seed (surname) =

Seed is a surname. Notable people with the surname include:

- Ahmed Mumin Seed, Somali politician and government minister
- Angus Seed (1893–1953), English footballer, manager of Barnsley
- Graham Seed (born 1950), English actor
- Harry Bolton Seed (1922–1989), British professor of geotechnical engineering at the University of California, Berkeley
- Huck Seed (born 1969), American poker player
- Jeremiah Seed (1700–1747), English clergyman and academic
- Jimmy Seed (1895–1966), English footballer and football manager
- Kev Seed (born 1968), English radio DJ
- Michael Seed (born 1957), British Roman Catholic priest
- Patricia Seed, American historian and author
- Paul Seed (born 1947), British television director and actor
- Richard Seed (1928–2013), American physicist and entrepreneur
- Richard Seed (priest) (born 1949), Church of England priest and archdeacon
- Walter D. Seed Sr. (1864–1932), American politician from Kentucky

== Other uses ==
- Joseph Seed, a recurring character from Ubisoft's Far Cry video game series
