= SAD =

The initialism SAD may refer to:

== Disorders ==
- Schizoaffective disorder, a psychiatric diagnosis
- Social anxiety disorder
- Seasonal affective disorder, typically winter depression
- Separation anxiety disorder

== Organizations ==
=== Political or military ===
- Shiromani Akali Dal, a political party in India
- Special Activities Division of the US Central Intelligence Agency, now named the Special Activities Center
- Saraya Awliya al-Dam, an Iraqi militia

=== Sports clubs ===
- Sociedad Anónima Deportiva, a type of incorporated sports club in Spain
- Sociedade Anónima Desportiva, a type of incorporated sports club in Portugal

== Science and technology ==
- Selected area diffraction, a crystallographic experimental technique
- Sum of absolute differences, in digital image processing
- Single-wavelength anomalous dispersion, in X-ray crystallography

== Transportation ==
- Sandwell & Dudley railway station, with the station code SAD
- Safford Regional Airport, Arizona, US, with the IATA airport code SAD

== Songs ==
- "S.A.D.", by Man Overboard from Heart Attack (2013)
- "Sad!", by XXXTENTACION (2018)

== Other uses ==
- SAD scheme, a form of intellectual property enforcement in the United States
- Singles Awareness Day, a humorous holiday every February 14
- The Single Administrative Document, EU customs form
- The Standard American Diet, another name for the Western pattern diet
- The Suicide Attack Database, now named the Database on Suicide Attacks
- Sagittal abdominal diameter, body diameter at the waistline

== See also ==
- Sad (disambiguation)
