= Pain Marznak =

Pain Marznak پائين مرزناك
- Village
- Location within Iran
- Coordinates: 36°23′28″N 52°41′55″E
- Country: Iran
- Province: Mazandaran
- County: Babol
- Bakhsh: Babol Kenar
- Rural District: Babol Kenar

Population (2006)
  - Total: 208
- Time zone: UTC+3:30 (IRST)
  - Summer (DST): UTC+4:30 (IRDT)

Pain Marznak (Persian: پائين مرزناك, also Romanized as Pā’īn Marznāk) is a village in Babol Kenar Rural District, Babol Kenar District, Babol County, Mazandaran Province, Iran. At the 2006 census, its population was 208, in 50 families.
