= Ibrahim B. Syed =

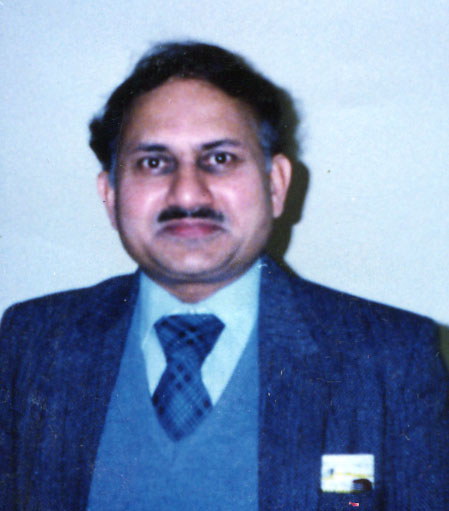
- Born: Bellary, Karnataka, India
- Education: University of Mysore; Johns Hopkins University
- Spouse: Sajida Begum Shariff
- Scientific career
- Fields: Radiology

Ibrahim Bijli Syed is an American radiological scientist, medical physicist, health physicist and the past president of the Islamic Research Foundation International.

== Biography ==
He was born in Bellary, Karnataka, the son of Mumtaz Begum and B. Syed Ahmed. He is married to Sajida Begum Shariff, who has an M.Sc. degree from the University of Mysore. They have one son.
