= Kelagar Kola =

Kelagar Kola كلاگركلا
- Village
- Location within Iran
- Coordinates: 36°28′20″N 52°39′39″E
- Country: Iran
- Province: Mazandaran
- County: Babol
- Bakhsh: Bandpey-ye Sharqi
- Rural District: Sajjadrud

Population (2006)
  - Total: 374
- Time zone: UTC+3:30 (IRST)
  - Summer (DST): UTC+4:30 (IRDT)

Kelagar Kola (Persian: كلاگركلا, also Romanized as Kelāgar Kolā; also known as Kelāgar Maḩalleh) is a village in Sajjadrud Rural District, Bandpey-ye Sharqi District, Babol County, Mazandaran Province, Iran. At the 2006 census, its population was 374, in 98 families.
