= Sad, Oman =

Sad
- Village
- Location in Oman
- Coordinates: 23°32′N 58°24′E
- Country: Oman
- Governorate: Muscat Governorate
- Time zone: UTC+4 (Oman Standard Time)

Sad is a village in Muscat, in northeastern Oman.
