= Seid =

Seid or SEID may refer to:

== Medicine ==
- Systemic exertion intolerance disease (SEID), alternative name for myalgic encephalomyelitis/chronic fatigue syndrome (ME/CFS)

== People ==
- Alamin Mohammed Seid, Eritrean politician
- Alan R. Seid (born 1957), Palauan businessman and politician
- Joseph Brahim Seid (1927–1970), Chadian writer and politician
- Ruth Seid (1913–1995), American novelist under the pen name Jo Sinclair
- Sattar Seid (born 1987), Iranian cross-country skier
- Seïd Khiter (born 1985), French footballer
- Seid Memić (born 1950), Bosnian singer

== Fictional characters ==
- Pasha Seid, in Verdi's opera Il corsaro
- Seid, in Mahomet (play)

== Other uses ==
- Seid or Seiðr, a type of Old Norse sorcery or witchcraft
- USS Seid (DE-256), a United States Navy destroyer escort of World War II
- Secure element ID (SEID), an aspect of near field communication

== See also ==
- Sead (disambiguation)
- Seed (disambiguation)
