= Chachadi =

- Village
- Country: India
- State: Karnataka
- District: Belgaum
- Taluka: Saundatti

Government
  - Type: Panchayat raj

Languages
  - Official: Kannada
- Time zone: UTC+5:30 (IST)
- PIN: 591102
- Nearest city: Bailhongal and Belgaum
- Lok Sabha constituency: Bailhongal
- Vidhan Sabha constituency: Bailhongal

Chachadi is an old village in the Belgaum district of the southern state of Karnataka, India. It is around 45 km from Belgaum and around 8 km from Nesargi town.

This small village in Saundatti taluk is more than 800 years old. The Chachadi Waade at the center of the village is living proof of its history. Today, the 24th generation of the Desai family is still inhabiting this Waade, although nowadays it is frequently being used as a set for Kannada serials and movies.
