= Najjar-e Galin =

Najjar-e Galin نجارگلين
- Village
- Location within Iran
- Coordinates: 34°14′22″N 45°56′51″E
- Country: Iran
- Province: Kermanshah
- County: Gilan-e Gharb
- Bakhsh: Central
- Rural District: Direh

Population (2006)
  - Total: 92
- Time zone: UTC+3:30 (IRST)
  - Summer (DST): UTC+4:30 (IRDT)

Najjar-e Galin (Persian: نجارگلين, also Romanized as Najjār-e Galīn and Najjār Galīn; also known as Galin Najjar, Golīn Najjār, and Najjār) is a village in Direh Rural District, in the Central District of Gilan-e Gharb County, Kermanshah Province, Iran. At the 2006 census, its population was 92, in 19 families.
