= AOL Seed =

AOL Seed was an open content submission website and platform operated by AOL from 2009 to 2012, when it was closed. Writers and photographers were able to submit their work, and then get paid for each work submitted. The work was then circulated throughout AOL's network of websites . It was run by Saul Hansell, a former technology reporter for The New York Times.

AOL Seed has been compared to Associated Content, a website with a similar model, now owned by Yahoo. The platform was part of AOL's strategy of positioning itself as an online news and information company. After AOL acquired the Huffington Post in 2011, Seed was no longer core to this strategy.
