= Gatab District =

District in Mazandaran province, Iran

Gatab District Persian: بخش گتاب
- District
- Location within Iran
- Coordinates: 36°25′N 52°38′E
- Country: Iran
- Province: Mazandaran
- County: Babol
- Established: 2000
- Capital: Gatab

Population (2016)
  - Total: 47,054
- Time zone: UTC+3:30 (IRST)

Gatab District (Persian: بخش گتاب) is in Babol County, Mazandaran province, Iran. Its capital is the city of Gatab.

== Demographics ==
=== Population ===
At the time of the 2006 National Census, the district's population was 45,104 in 11,185 households. The following census in 2011 counted 46,041 people in 13,597 households. The 2016 census measured the population of the district as 47,054 inhabitants in 15,497 households.

=== Administrative divisions ===
Gatab District Population
Administrative Divisions	2006	2011	2016
Gatab-e Jonubi RD	14,743	14,955	15,030
Gatab-e Shomali RD (Note: Formerly Gatab Rural District)	23,405	23,844	24,650
Gatab (city)	6,956	7,242	7,374
Total	45,104	46,041	47,054
RD = Rural District
