= Personal Clothes =

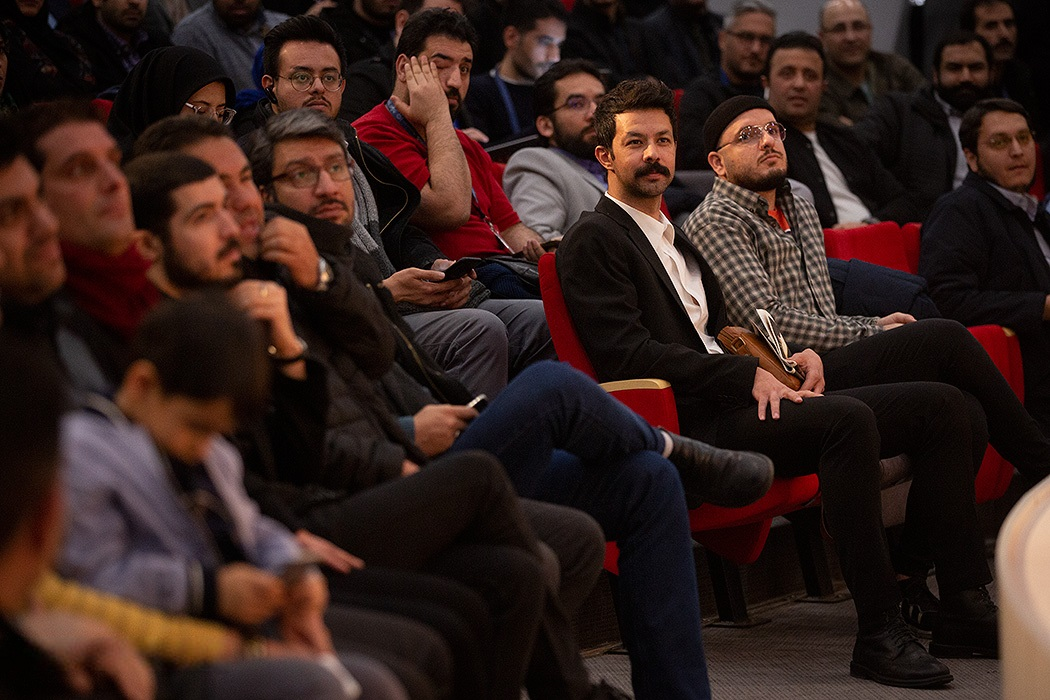
- The movie press conference 2020
- Directed by: Amir Abbas Rabiei
- Written by: Amir Abbas Rabiei
- Produced by: Habibollah Valinezhad
- Production company: Owj Arts and Media Organization
- Release dates: 2019 (Fajr Film Festival); January 2020 (Iran)
- Running time: 122 minutes
- Country: Iran
- Language: Persian

Personal Clothes (Persian: لباس شخصی, romanized: Lebas shakhsi) is a 2019 political and historical film directed and written by Amir Abbas Rabiei and produced by Habib Valinejad. The film is a product of the Owj Arts and Media Organization , and the logo of the film was designed by the House of Islamic Revolution Designers. The film deals with the events of the 1960s and the activities of the Tudeh Party in Iran, and depicts figures such as Noureddine Kianuri and Ehsan Tabari. The film was featured in the New Look section of the 38th Fajr Film Festival in 2020.

== Synopsis ==
Yaser is recruited by the IRGC and loses his son during the bombing of Tehran. He wants to find the trace of betrayal in one of the non-revolutionary groups.

== Cast ==
Mehdi Nosrati (as Yaser), Toumaj Danesh Behzadi (as Hanif, the commander of the IRGC), Majid Pataki, Milad Afom, Emad Darvishi, Mahyar Shapouri, Ahmad Lashini, Shahab Bahrami, Roozbeh Raofi, Keyvan Mahmoudnejad (as Mehdi Partovi, the head of the secret organization of the Tudeh Party), Najla Nazarian, and Mahmonir Bitari are among the actors in this film.

== Other factors ==
Writer and director: Amir Abbas Rabiei, Producer: Habib Valinejad, Director of photography: Hashem Moradi, Sound director: Amir Ashegh Hosseini, Programming director: Bahman Hosseini, Editor: Mehdi Saadi, Production manager: Mansour Ghazanfari, Assistant director: Mehdi Soleimani, Set secretary: Sara Abdollahi, Set and costume designer: Mohammad Reza Shojaei, Makeup designer: Mohsen Darsanj, Special visual effects: Javad Matouri, Special field effects: Iman Karmian, Photographer: Moein Bagheri, Stuntman: Keyvan Rezaei, Production assistant: Afshin Raofi, Procurement manager: Bahram Danaei, Media consultant: Mostafa Bayat.

== Gallery ==
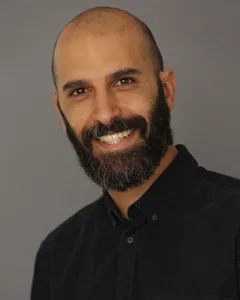
Toumaj Danesh Behzadi, actor of the role of Hanif

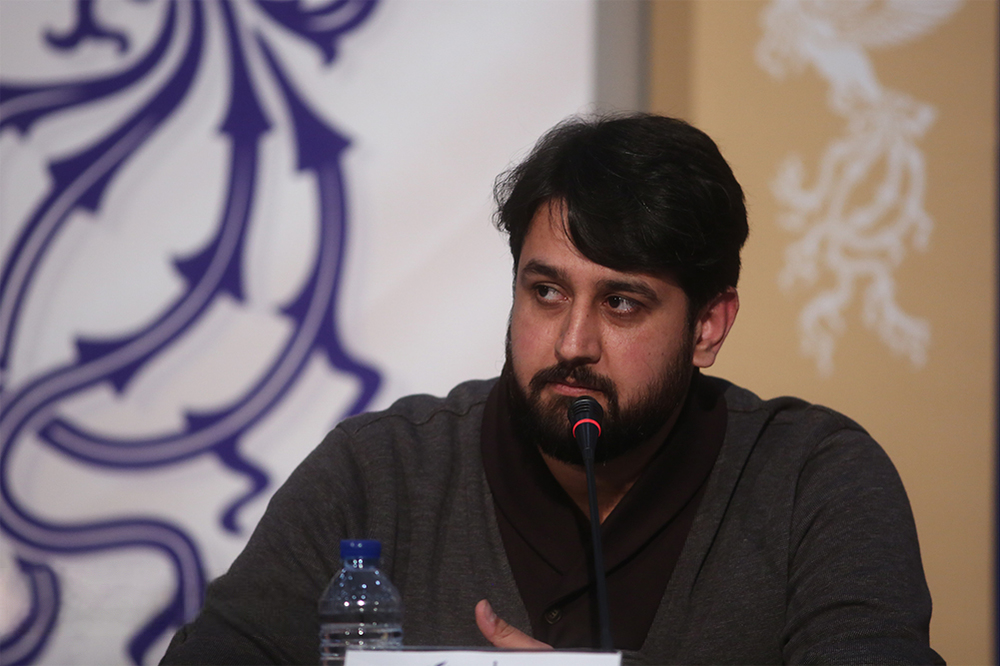
Amir Abbas Rabiei, director and writer

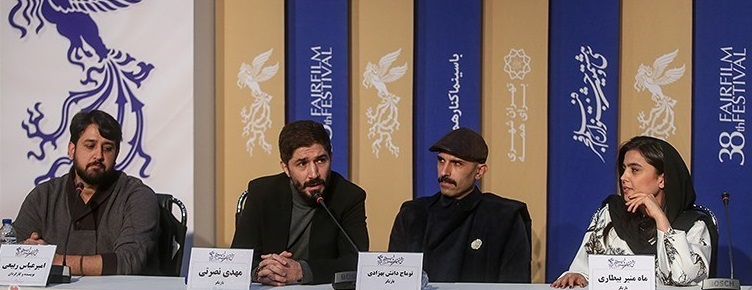
Press conference for the film Lebas shakhsi
