= Baduspan =

Baduspan (also spelled Badusban and Fadusban) was the name of a mountainous district located in the Alborz area of Tabaristan/Mazandaran, a region on the Caspian coast of northern Iran. It was a days walk south of the city of Sari.

== Sources ==
- de Planhol, X. (1988). "Bādūspān". In Yarshater, Ehsan (ed.). Encyclopædia Iranica. Vol. III/4: Bačča(-ye) Saqqā–Bahai Faith III. London and New York: Routledge & Kegan Paul. p. 385. ISBN 978-0-71009-116-1.
