= Sari, Iran =

Capital of Mazandaran Province, Iran

Sari Persian: ساری Zadracarta
- City
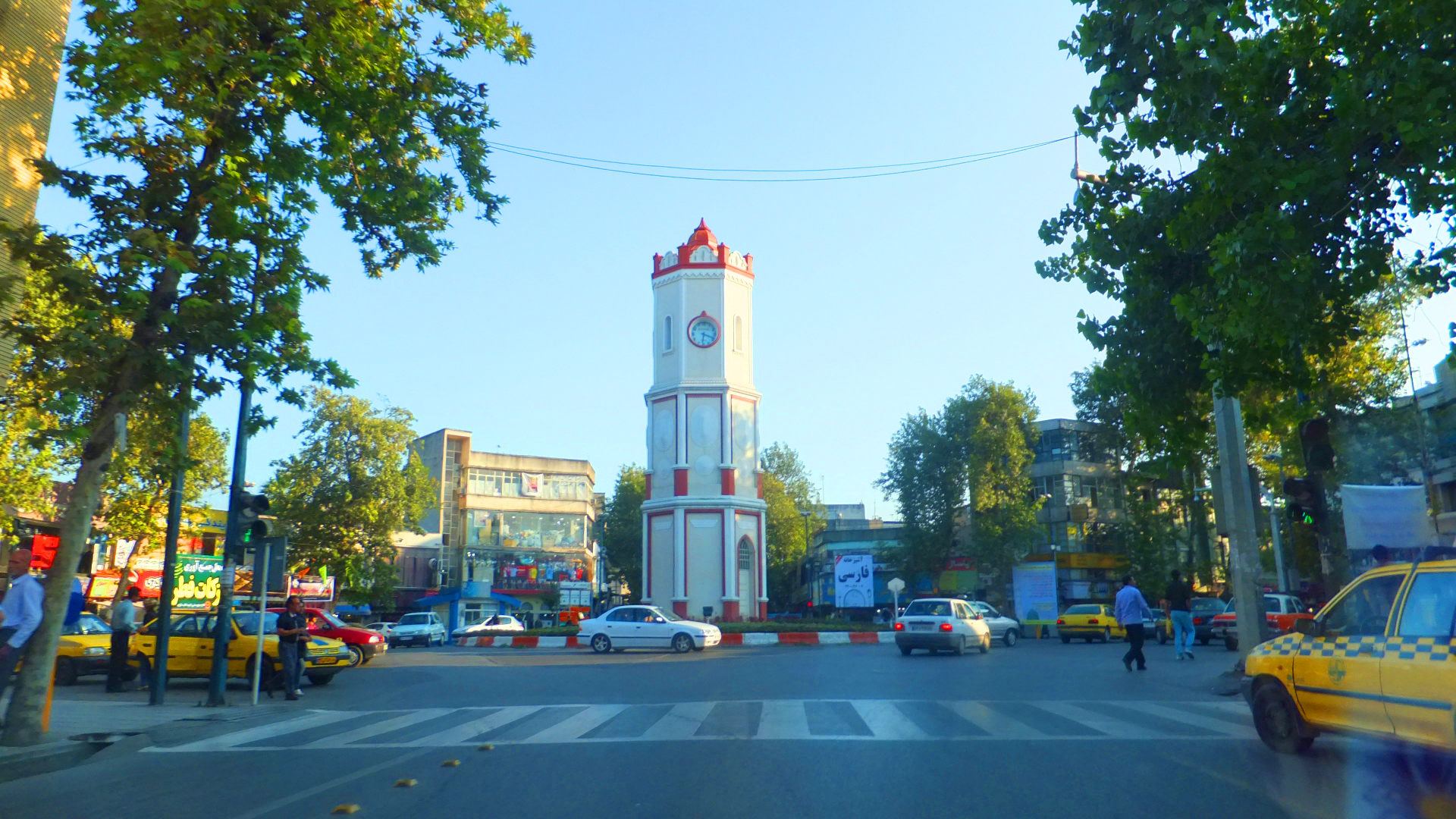
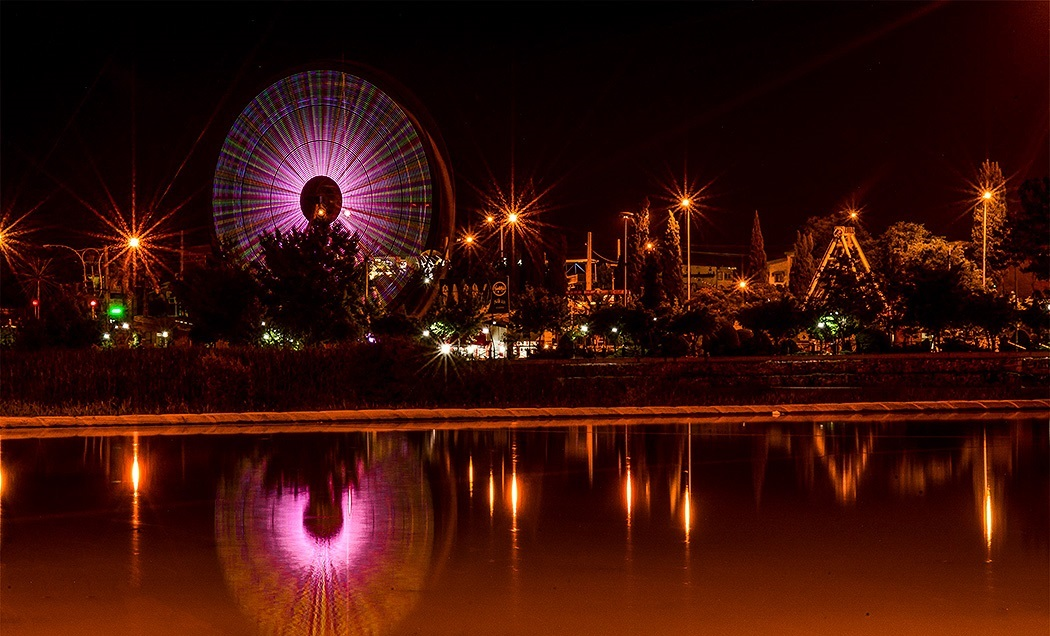
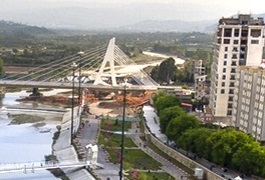
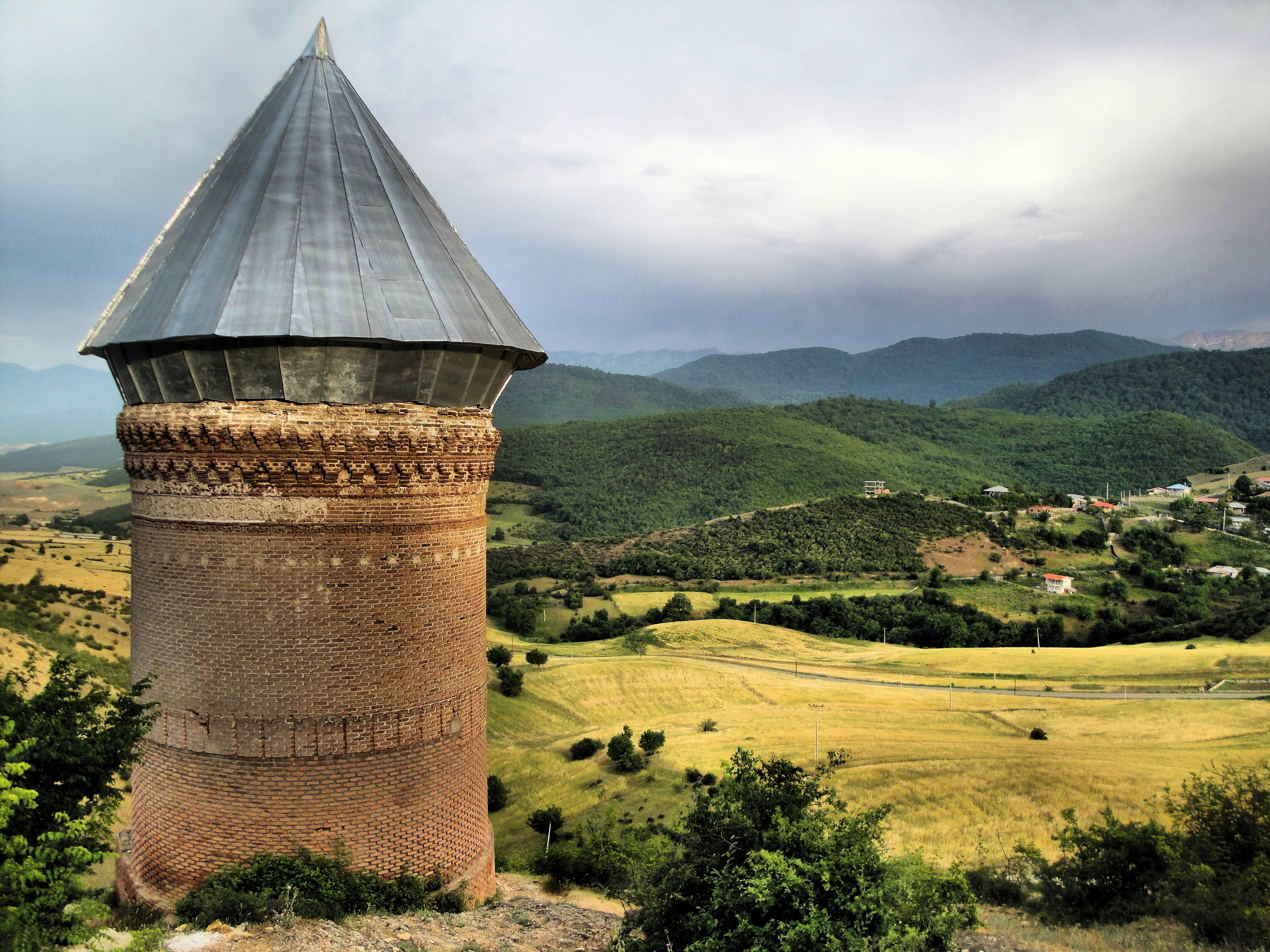
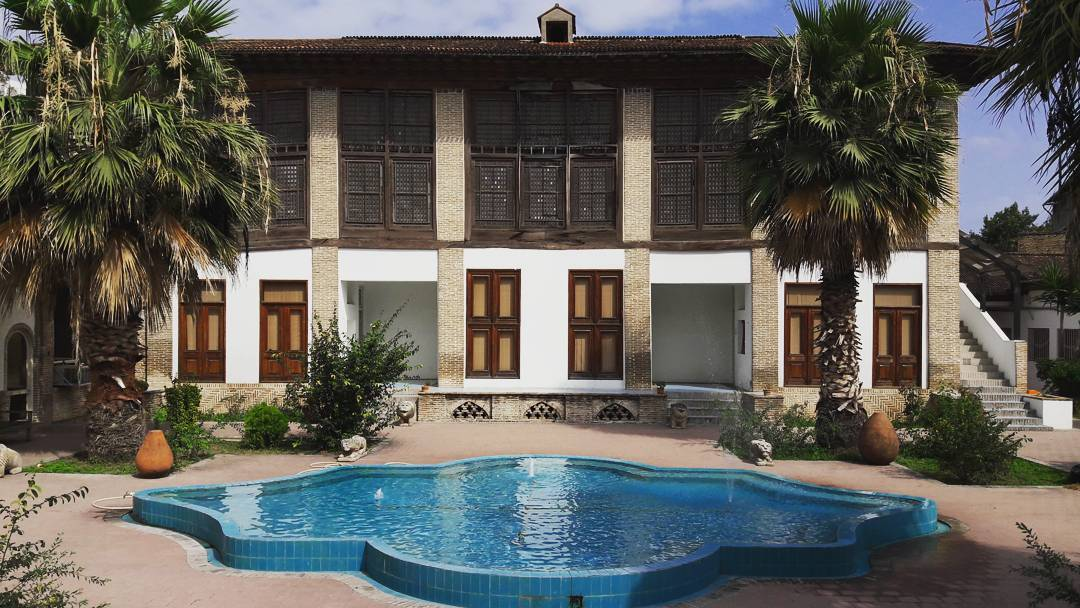
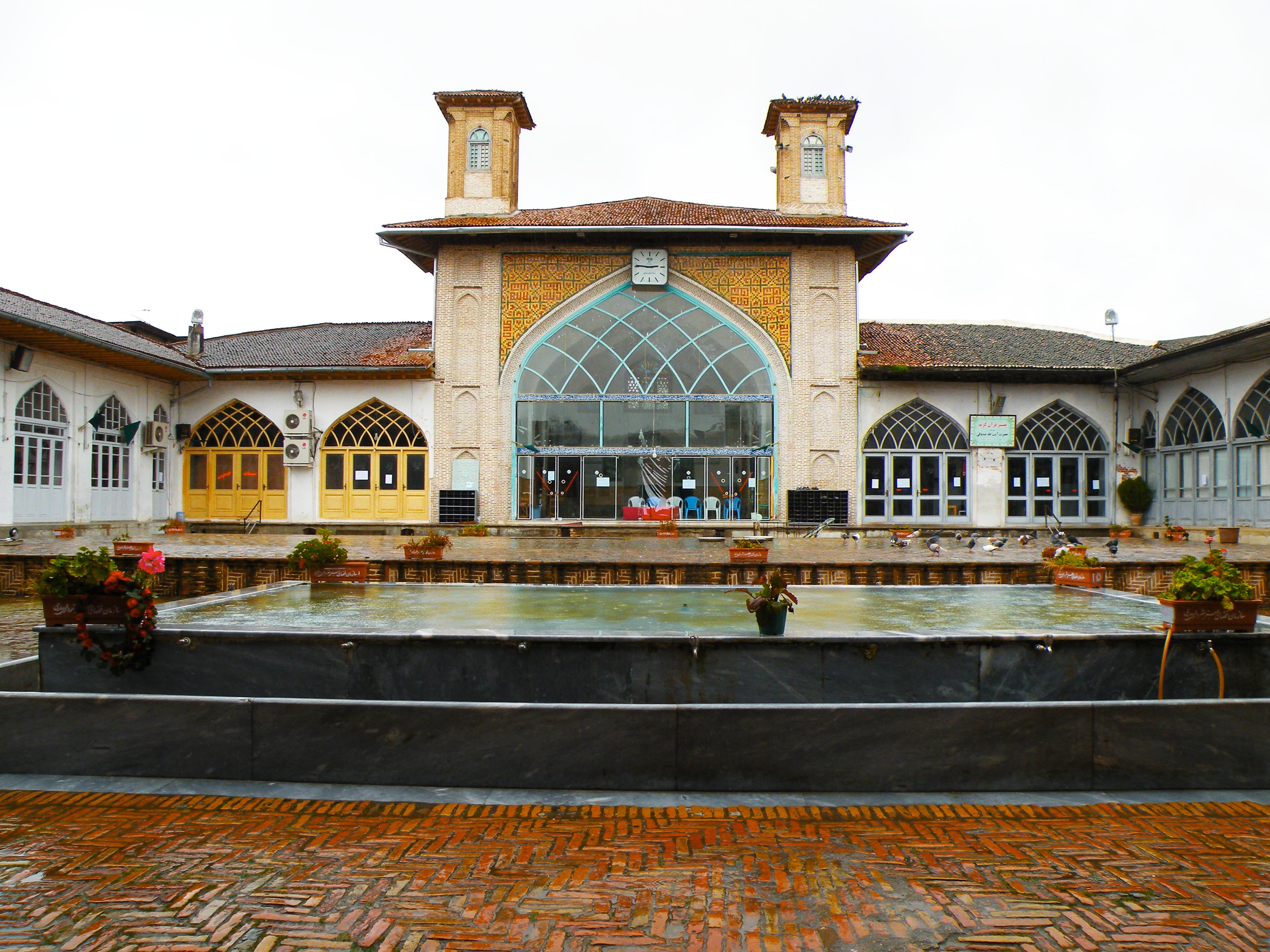
- Melal Park, Fazeli House, Clock Square, Jameh Mosque of Sari, Resket Tower, Kolbadi House

- Seal
- Nicknames: Shar-e-tejan, sâravieh, sepidieh
- Location within Iran
- Coordinates: 36°33′38″N 53°03′30″E
- Country: Iran
- Province: Mazandaran
- County: Sari
- District: Central
- Founded: By Farrukhan the Great, Dabuyid dynasty of Tapuria

Government
  - Mayor: Morteza Barbasteh

Area
  - Total: 57 km^{2} (22 sq mi)
- Elevation: 25 to 200 m (82 to 656 ft)

Population (2016)
  - Total: 347,402
- Time zone: UTC+3:30 (IRST)
- Postal Code: 48xxx-xxxxx
- Area code: 011
- Vehicle registration: IRAN 62
- Website: www.sari.ir www.sarycity.ir

Sari (Persian: ساری [sɒːˈɾiː]) (Note: Also romanized as Sâri and Sārī; also known as Shahr-e-Tajan and Shari-e-Tajan) is a city in the Central District of Sari County, Mazandaran province, serving as capital of the district, county, and province. Sari was the former capital of Iran for a short period and is in the north of the country, between the northern slopes of the Alborz Mountains and southern coast of the Mazandaran Sea. Sari is the largest and most populous city of Mazandaran and ranked as the most livable city in Iran.

== History ==
=== Early history ===
Excavations in the Hutto cave present evidence for the existence of settlements around Sari as far back as the 7th millennium BCE. The Muslim historian Hamdollah Mostowfi attributes the foundation of Sari to king Tahmoures Divband of the Pishdadian Dynasty. Ferdowsi mentions the name of the city in Shahnameh, at the time of Fereydun and Manuchehr, when Manuchehr is returning to Fereydun's capital, Tamisheh in Mazandaran, after the victory over Salm and Tur:

ز دریای گیلان (مازندران) چون ابر سیاه / دمادم به ساری رسید آن سپاه / چو آمد به نزدیک شاه آن سپاه / فریدون پذیره بیامد به راه

the city's name was also Zadracarta in 658 B.C to 225 A.D.

Coming from this and other similar evidence in the Shahnameh, native people of Sari have a folklore that the city was populated when the blacksmith Kaveh (a native of the city) revolted against the tyranny of Zahak. After that success, Fereydun of Pishdadi (from Tamishan) feeling indebted to Kaveh, chose this city so as to live near him until his death. For this reason, when Touraj and Salam murdered Iraj (son of Fereydun), they buried him here.

Espahbod Tous-e Nouzar (great-grandson of Fereydun) systematically founded it to remain as family monument. Sari may be synonymous with the city of Zadracarta mentioned by Ancient Greek sources as early as the 6th century BCE (Achaemenid era). However, other sources suggest that modern Gorgan is located closer to, or on, the site of Zadracarta.

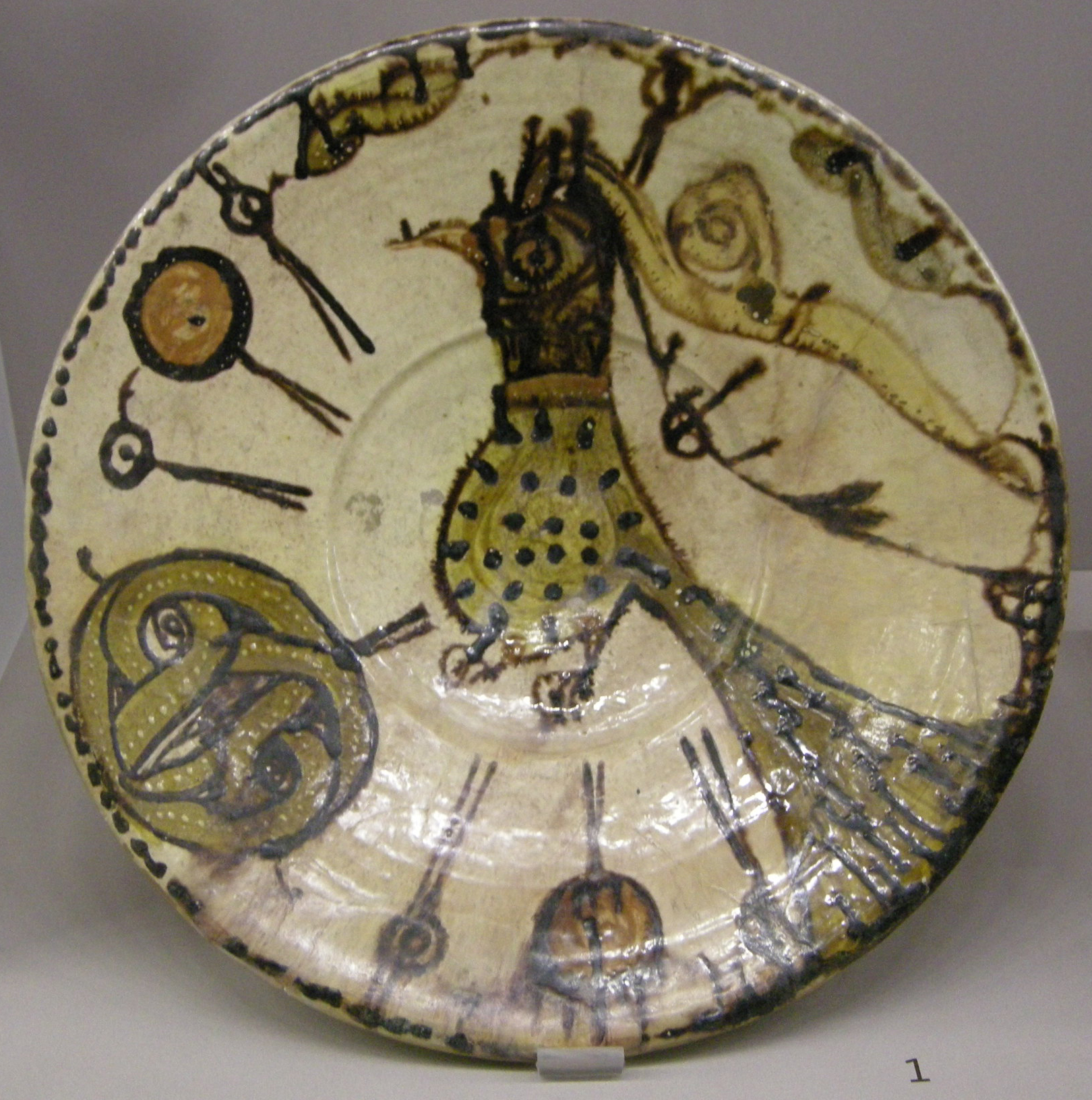
Ancient dish found in Sari

According to Arrian, this was the largest city of Hyrcania. The term means "the yellow city" and it was given to it because of the great number of orange, lemon, and other fruit trees that grew in the outskirts of that city. Hence it is by D'Anville, Rochette, and other geographers, identified Saru, which Pietro Della Valle says in his "Travels" means "the yellow city".

It is probable that Zadracarta and Saru are the same with the Syringis of Polybius, taken from Arsaces II by Antiochus III the Great, in his vain attempt to reunite the revolted provinces of Hyrcania and Parthia to the Syrian crown. Han Way, who visited Saru in 1734, makes mention of four ancient Magian temples as still standing then, built in the form of several rotundas, each thirty feet in diameter, and about 120 in height.

However, Sir William Ouseley, who had travelled to the site in 1811, has speculated that these to be masses of brick masonry of the Mohammedan age. Out of four, one of the rotunda is still standing since the rest were overturned by an earthquake. This and other remains of similar buildings, bear the names of Fereydun, Salm, Tur, and other mythical figures, whose celebrity had been established about 2000 years prior to their erection. One of them Avas called the tomb of Kaus, and was supposed to contain the ashes of Cyrus the Great. Sir William Ouseley thinks it was that of Kabus, or Kaus, the son of Washmakin, who governed Mazanderan in the fourth century of the Hejira.

It was at Saru that the ashes of the youthful hero, Sohrab, were deposited by his father, Rostam, after he had unwittingly slayed Sohrab in a hand-to-hand battle. Saru is celebrated for its abundance of gardens, which emit a pleasing fragrance in the vernal and summer months. An oriental proverb declares that the "gates of paradise derive sweetness from the air of Sari and the flowers of Eden receive their fragrance from its soil". The city was again a regional capital in the Sasanian era.

=== Capital of Tabaristan local rulers ===
In the seventh century, Farrukhan the Great of the Dabuyid dynasty reconstructed the city, and because his son's name was "Saruyeh", he called it by this name. Sari once again became the capital of Tabaristan during that century (Amol was the capital previously ).

After invasions by the successors of Mongols, Timur of Uzbeks, Turcoman, and Tatars the city lost its high status and was periodically burnt to ashes.

=== Safavid-Qajar era ===
Because Shah Abbas the Great's mother, Khayr al-Nisa Begum, was from Behshahr (Ashraf), he founded Farahabad as his alternate capital of Iran in the north of the city and created the gardens in Ashraf. Mazandaran alongside neighboring Gilan were subsequently settled during Abbas' reign by large numbers of Georgians, Circassians, Armenians and other peoples of the Caucasus, whose descendants still live across Mazandaran. Still many towns, villages and neighbourhoods in Mazandaran bear the name "Gorji" (i.e. Georgian) in them, although most of the Georgians are already assimilated into the mainstream Mazanderanis. After the Safavid dynasty fell and until the rise of Agha Mohammad Khan to power there, is no evidence of any notable events in Sari.

=== Early 20th century ===
Major developments took place during the Pahlavi era. During the reign of Reza Shah, the face of the town was changed drastically. Sari Rail Station and most of the streets and governmental buildings date from that era. During the Anglo-Soviet invasion of Iran the Soviet Army occupied the city, but left it after the war.

== Geography ==
The coastline north of Sari fronts onto the Mazandaran Sea; north-east of the city lies Neka. Qa'emshahr (formerly known as Shahi) is to its south-west, Juybar is to its north-west, and Kiasar, Damghan, and Semnan are cities located to the south.

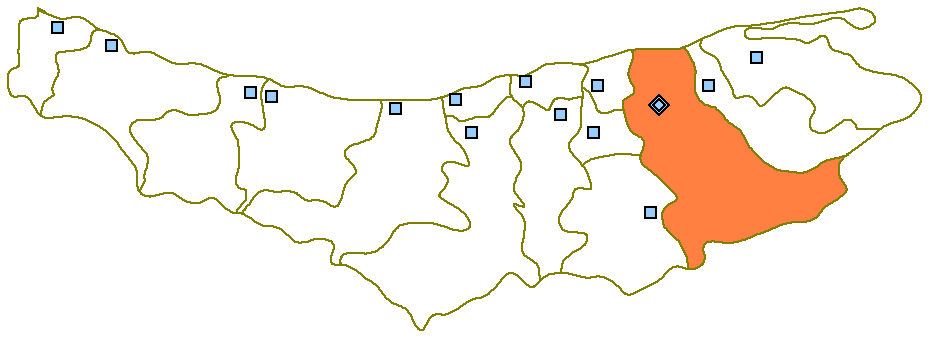
Map showing position of Sari county as well as Sari city in Mazandaran province

=== Climate ===
Sari has a humid subtropical climate (Köppen: Cfa, Trewartha: Cf) that borders on a Mediterranean climate (Csa). Winters are cool and rainy whilst summers are hot and humid. Sari's 2005–2006 statistical weather information, in comparison with that of other Mazandaran cities, shows that Sari has an average climate, but it is somewhat sunnier and has more spring rain. However, recent rainfall in Sari has declined.

Extremes for the Mahdasht Station:

Highest recorded temperature: 44.0 °C (111.2 °F) on 4 June 1980

Lowest recorded temperature: −5.0 °C (23.0 °F) on 17 February 1993

Climate data for Mahdasht, Sari (1967-2003 normals and extremes)
Month	Jan	Feb	Mar	Apr	May	Jun	Jul	Aug	Sep	Oct	Nov	Dec	Year
Record high °C (°F)	30.2 (86.4)	31.2 (88.2)	35.0 (95.0)	37.0 (98.6)	39.0 (102.2)	44.0 (111.2)	39.0 (102.2)	40.5 (104.9)	39.0 (102.2)	38.0 (100.4)	34.0 (93.2)	30.0 (86.0)	44.0 (111.2)
Mean daily maximum °C (°F)	11.9 (53.4)	11.9 (53.4)	14.0 (57.2)	20.9 (69.6)	25.2 (77.4)	29.2 (84.6)	31.2 (88.2)	31.2 (88.2)	28.5 (83.3)	24.1 (75.4)	19.0 (66.2)	14.4 (57.9)	21.8 (71.2)
Mean daily minimum °C (°F)	3.3 (37.9)	3.4 (38.1)	5.0 (41.0)	9.4 (48.9)	13.8 (56.8)	17.8 (64.0)	20.7 (69.3)	21.2 (70.2)	18.6 (65.5)	13.8 (56.8)	9.3 (48.7)	5.2 (41.4)	11.8 (53.2)
Record low °C (°F)	−2.5 (27.5)	−5.0 (23.0)	−3.5 (25.7)	1.0 (33.8)	2.0 (35.6)	4.0 (39.2)	8.5 (47.3)	10.0 (50.0)	2.5 (36.5)	0.0 (32.0)	−2.0 (28.4)	−5.0 (23.0)	−5.0 (23.0)
Average precipitation mm (inches)	105.2 (4.14)	91.5 (3.60)	100.6 (3.96)	60.5 (2.38)	53.2 (2.09)	36.2 (1.43)	35.5 (1.40)	58.8 (2.31)	88.9 (3.50)	98.1 (3.86)	104.4 (4.11)	114.4 (4.50)	947.3 (37.28)
Average precipitation days	8	8	10	7	6	4	5	6	7	7	7	8	83
Average relative humidity (%)	77	76	76	72	69	66	66	70	73	75	76	76	73
Average dew point °C (°F)	3.4 (38.1)	3.2 (37.8)	5.5 (41.9)	10.2 (50.4)	14.0 (57.2)	17.2 (63.0)	19.2 (66.6)	20.2 (68.4)	18.3 (64.9)	14.1 (57.4)	9.6 (49.3)	5.7 (42.3)	11.7 (53.1)
Source: Iranian Meteorological Organization

== Overview ==
The Clock Tower, in the Clock Square (Meydan-e-Sa'at) located in downtown Sari, attracts visitors and has become a local landmark. Mohammad Ali Hamidi built the clock tower in 1930. Sari also contains the tombs of the Muslim cleric leaders Yahya and Zayn Al-Abedin, Emamzade-ye Abbas, and Shazdeh Hussein the architecture of which are from the 15th century.

== Economy ==
The economy of Sari is based on food production such as milled rice, dairy products, canned meat and cookies. Sari is a major citrus fruits producer, especially oranges, tangerines and lemons. Oil seeds such as soybean and grape being cultivated in vast lands around villages for producing of vegetable ghee and cooking oil. During the 1950s to 1970s, a factory of MM company was the city's largest industrial complex and one of the country's biggest vegetable oil producers. After the 1979 Iranian revolution, the company was nationalised but went bankrupt and closed later on. Other sources of the economy include, but are not limited to, paper, wood, fabrics and construction materials. Mazandaran Wood and Paper Industries, the biggest factory of its kind in the middle east, is situated in a 2000-acre ground on Semnan Road. Mazpaper is presently producing more than 20% of country's paper requirements and is a major economical entity not only for the city but also for the province. The MWPI's major subsidiary is the NEKA CHOUB Co., that is manufacturing plywood and chipboard.

The city is served by Refah Chain Stores Co., Iran Hyper Star, Isfahan City Center, Shahrvand Chain Stores Inc., Ofoq Kourosh chain store.

== City districts ==
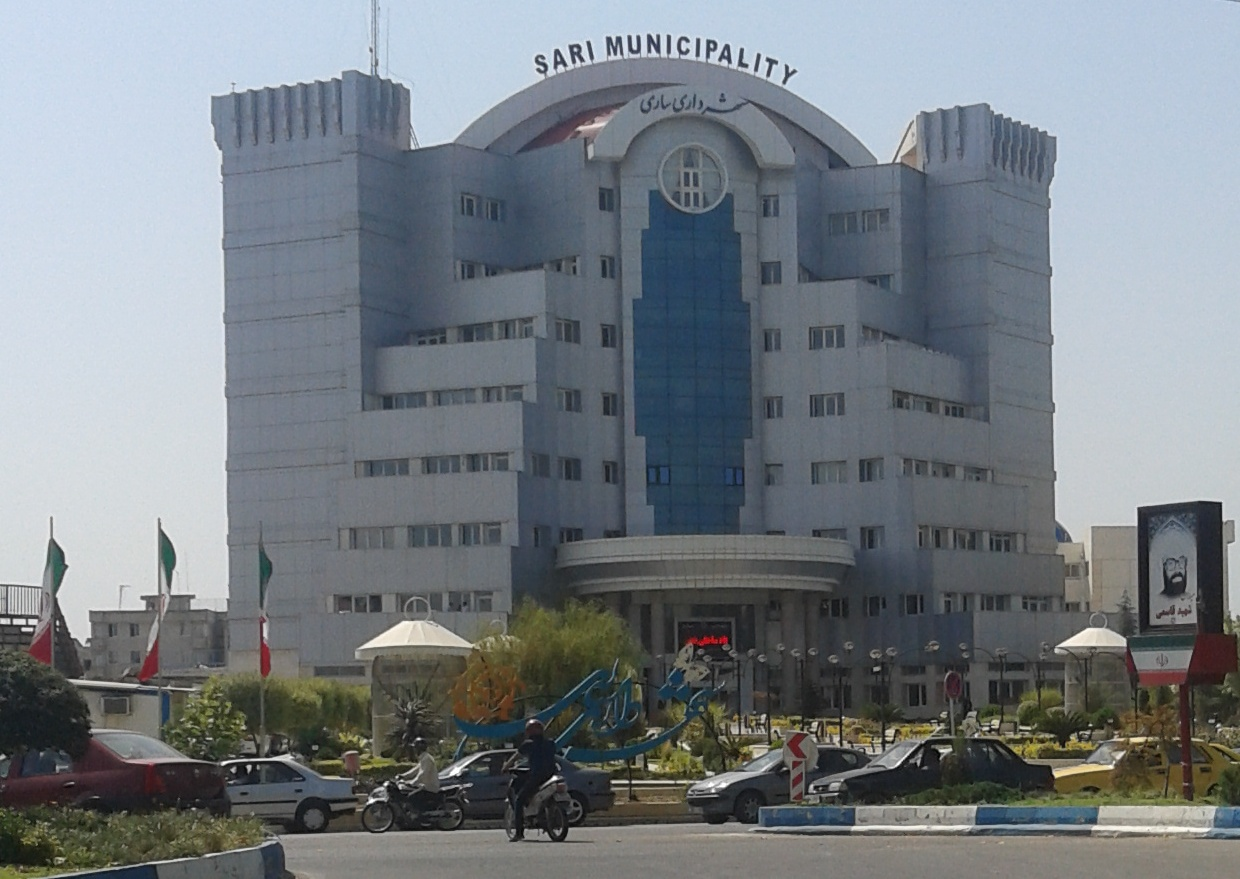
Sari Municipality

In 2011, Sari was divided into 3 municipal districts, in 2021 a 4th district was established that encompasses the old town of Sari.

There are 74 neighborhoods in Sari.

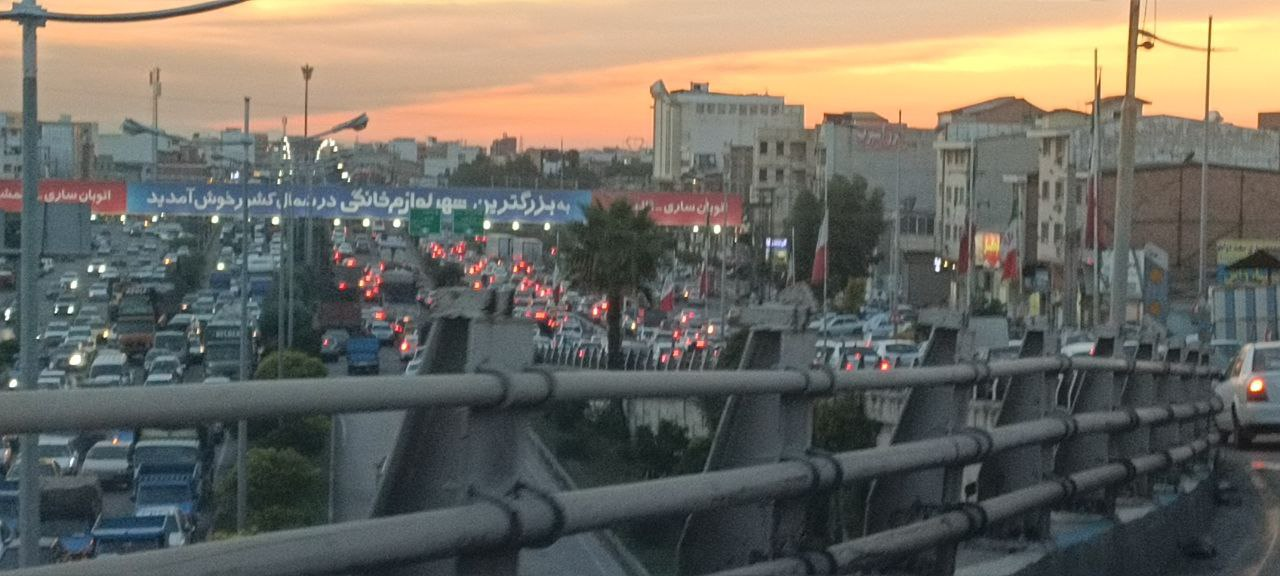
valiasr highway, the border between farah abad, sari now and tabaristan neighborhoods

== Previous districts ==
Sari's old city structure changed in the first Pahlavi era. New avenues and streets in the city center date from that period. In the Qajar dynasty, Sari's neighborhoods included:
Bahar Abad, Balouchi Kheyl, Balouchi Mahalleh, Birameter (Bahram-Ottor), Chaleh Bagh, Dar Masdjed, Isfahouni Mahalleh, Kohneh Baq Shah, Kurd Mahalleh, Mir Mashad Mahalleh, Mir Sar Rozeh, Na'l Bandan, Naqareh Khaneh, Ossanlou Mahalleh, Paay-e Chenar, QelichLi Mahalleh, Sabzeh Meydan, Shazdeh Hossein, Shepesh Koshan, Shishehgar Mahalleh.

== Demographics ==
=== Population ===
The population density of some neighborhoods in downtown (for example: Mirzazamani, Peyvandi, Sang) is greater than 20,000 per square kilometer. Note that before 1950, the population of the city during the summer was less than in winter. This influenced estimations, such that an estimate done in summer might be inaccurate.

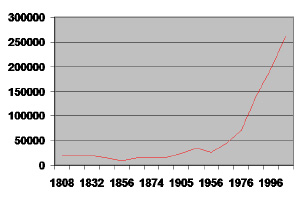
Population of Sari From 19th century.

- 1808 = 21,000 est.
- 1827 = 19,000 est.
- 1832 = 20,000 est.
- 1850 = 15,000 est.
- 1856 = 9,000 est.
- 1872 = 15,500 est.
- 1874 = 16,000 est.
- 1883 = 16,100 est.
- 1905 = 25,000 est.
- 1923 = 35,000 est.
- 1956 = 26,278 cen.
- 1966 = 44,547 cen.
- 1976 = 70,753 cen.
- 1986 = 141,020 cen.
- 1996 = 195,882 cen.

At the time of the 2006 National Census, the city's population was 259,084 in 71,522 households. The following census in 2011 counted 296,417 people in 90,798 households. The 2016 census measured the population of the city as 309,820 people in 101,932 households.

=== People and culture ===
Most Sari people speak the Mazandarani language Tabari as a mother tongue; however, Persian is the most common language spoken in Iran and the lingua franca.

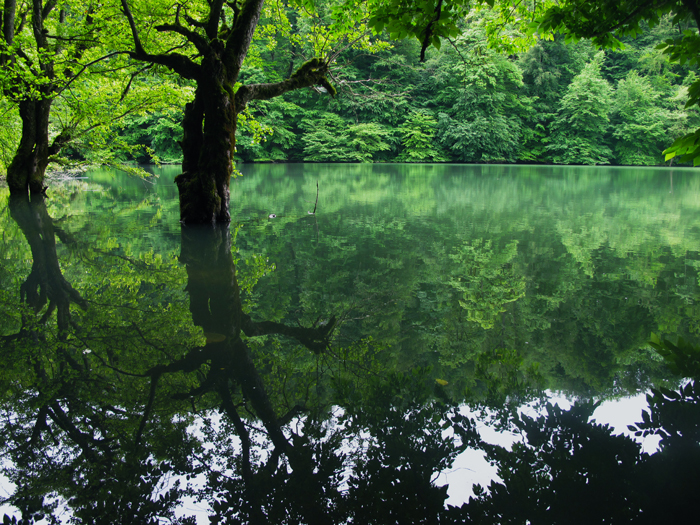
Miansheh Lake

Zoroastrians from Sari who fled to India in the 10th century founded there a city which they named "Navu Sari" (English: "New Sari"), a name which was by now shortened to Navsari; the town is still a center of the Zoroastrian Parsi community of India.

== Transport ==
=== Arriving ===
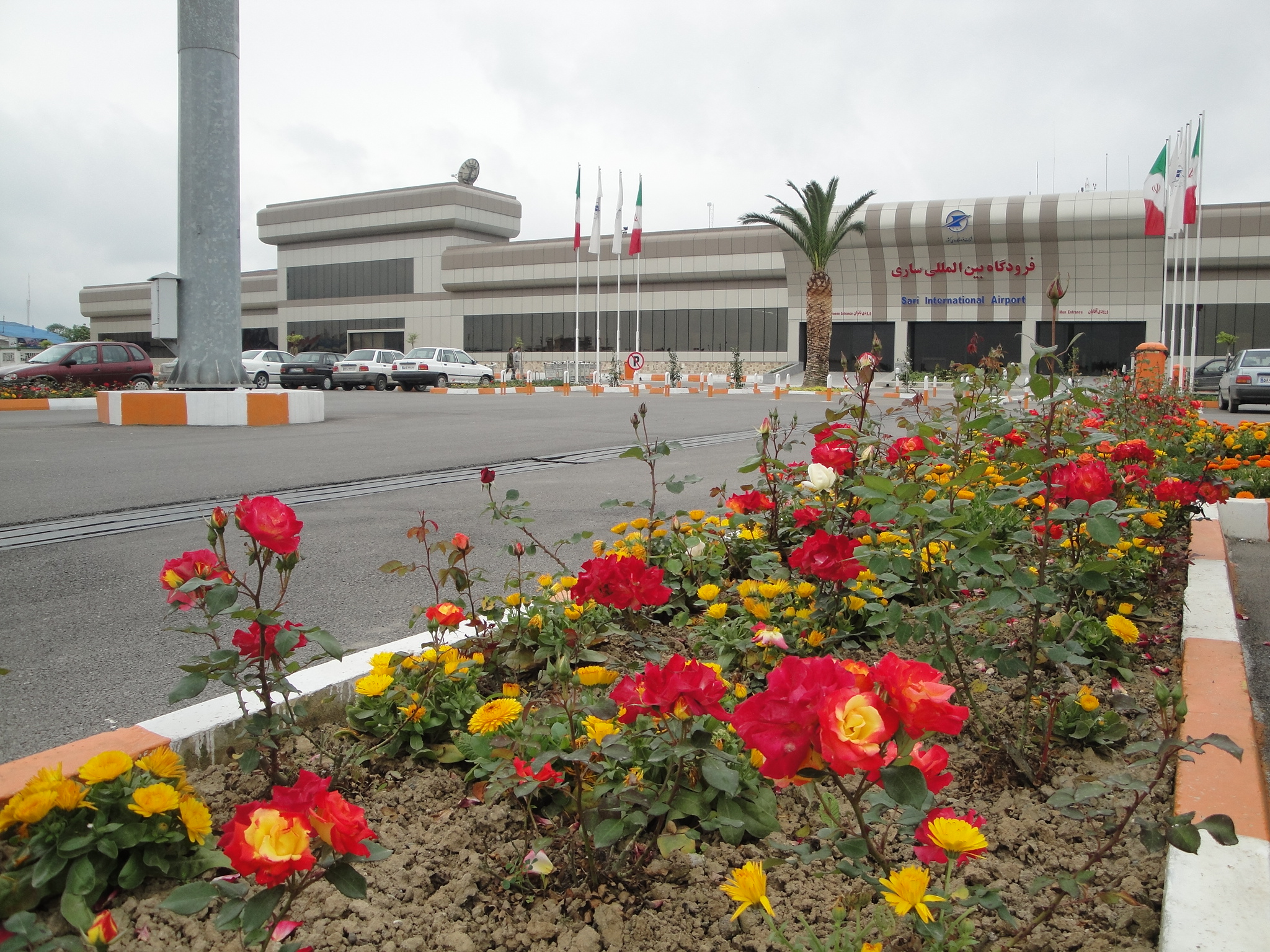
Sari International Airport

==== By air ====
Sari is served by Dasht-e Naz International Airport, which is located in the north-eastern part of the city. List of arrival and departure flights can be found in the Airport's website.

==== By train ====
The city is connected to Gorgan and Tehran by the Shomal Railway route. That is a major branch of Iran's Railroad.

==== By boat ====
The port of Amir Abad is located on the southern coast of the Caspian Sea.

==== By car ====
Local highways have been well developed after the Iran–Iraq War. Road 22 connects Sari to several cities in the province such as Qaemshahr, Neka and Babol, as well as major cities outside the province such as Gorgan and Mashhad.

==== By bus ====
There are five bus terminals, but one, Terminal-e Dowlat, is the most used. The others serve cities that are located within 150 kilometers from Sari: Gorgan, Nowshahr, Chaloos, and Kiyasar are within this range.

By Train	By Road
Gorgan	153 km*	138 Kilometers	Neka, Behshahr, Gaz, Nokandeh, Gorgan
Bojnourd	Behshahr, Gorgan, Minoodasht, Ashkhaneh, Bojnourd
Mashad	1152 km*	730 Kilometers	Behshahr, Gorgan, Bonjnourd, Quchan, Mashad
Babol	45 Kilometers*	Qa'emshahr, Babol
Nowshahr	170 Kilometers	Jouybar, Babolsar, Fereydoon Kenar, Nour, Royan, Nowshahr
Lahijan	Babolsar, Nour, Nowshahr, Shahsavar, Ramsar, Chaboksar, Lahijan
By Train	Via Savadkooh Road	Via Kiasar Road	Via Azadshahr Road	Via Haraz Road
Tehran	354 km*	265 Kilometers*	245 Kilometers
Semnan	354 km*
Shahroud	555 km*

* indicates that destination is actually nearer than the figure shown

=== Getting around ===
The layout of the city renders occasional use of taxis. There is a wide choice of taxi systems including limousines, wireless radio taxis, airport or rail station taxis, and telephone taxis. City buses are also common because they connect Sari's suburbs to the center of city, providing a low cost and convenient means of transportation to and from the town for people living in those neighborhoods. Although Sari is considered a safe city for pedestrians even at night, nevertheless care should be taken when walking around.

== Outdoors ==
Places of interest in the area include:

- Farah Abad Coast
- Gohar Baran Coast
- Tajan River Park
- Melal park (It is located on the western side of Tajan River. Melal Park has a Biking track and an Artificial Island)
- Zare' Forest Park
- Salardareh Forest Park
- Nemashoun Lake
- Lak-Dasht Lake
- Soleyman-Tangeh Lake (A dam lake 45 km Southwest of Sari)
- Jamaloddin kola (Damaneh kohe shahdezh)

== Colleges and universities ==
In the course of history, Sari was once one of the most cultured cities in Iran. The scientific knowledge of Saravis were noted throughout history and recorded by Pietro Della Valle and other visitors. Today, the universities are as follows:

- University of Agricultural Science and Natural Resources
- Mazandaran University of Medical Sciences (MazUMS)
- University of Natural Science
- Islamic Azad University of Sari
- Imam Mohammad Bagher University of Technology
- Sarian University of Art & Architecture
- Payam-e-Noor University
- University of Tech & Engineering (Khalil Moqadam)
- University of Tarbiyat-e Moallem
- Sama Technology Faculty of Azad University
- Rouzbehan University
- Science and Research Branch Islamic azad university
- Hadaf University

== Sports facilities ==
Many sport complexes are in Sari, including:

- Jahan-Pahlavan Takhti Sports Complex, located on Farhang Street;
- Hashemi-Nassab Sports Complex, located on the railway side of the autobahn;
- Montazeri Sports complex, located in Shahband neighborhood.

Sari's Mottaqi football stadium is one of the oldest sports field in the country but nowadays it is seldom used in major soccer matches.

=== Wrestling ===
Sari is the birthplace of several wrestlers and athletes. Notable wrestlers from Sari include Asgari Mohammadian, Majid Torkan and Morad Mohammadi. The town was the host and scene of 2006 Wrestling World Cup Competitions.

== Cultural attractions ==
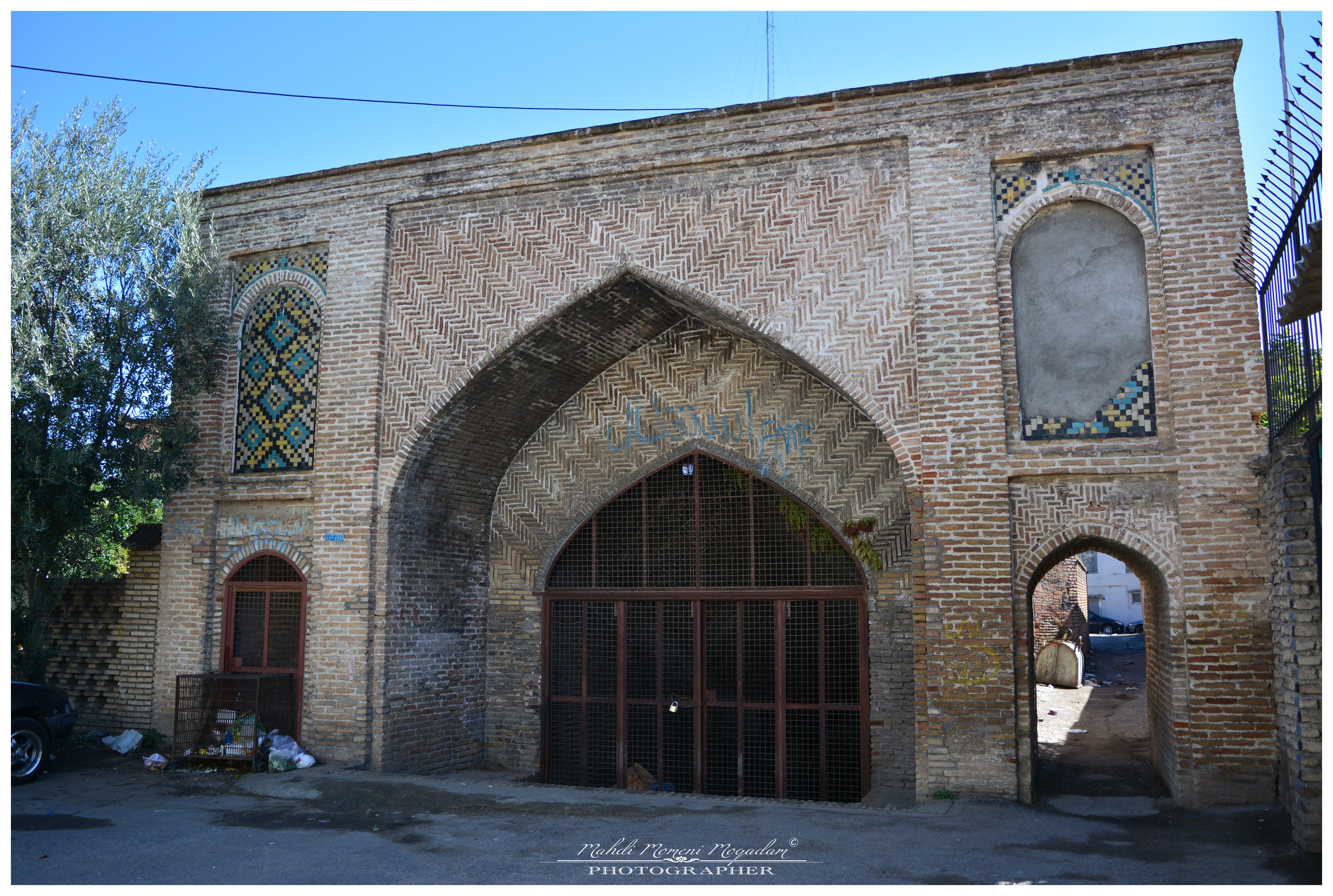
Ab Anbar at Sari

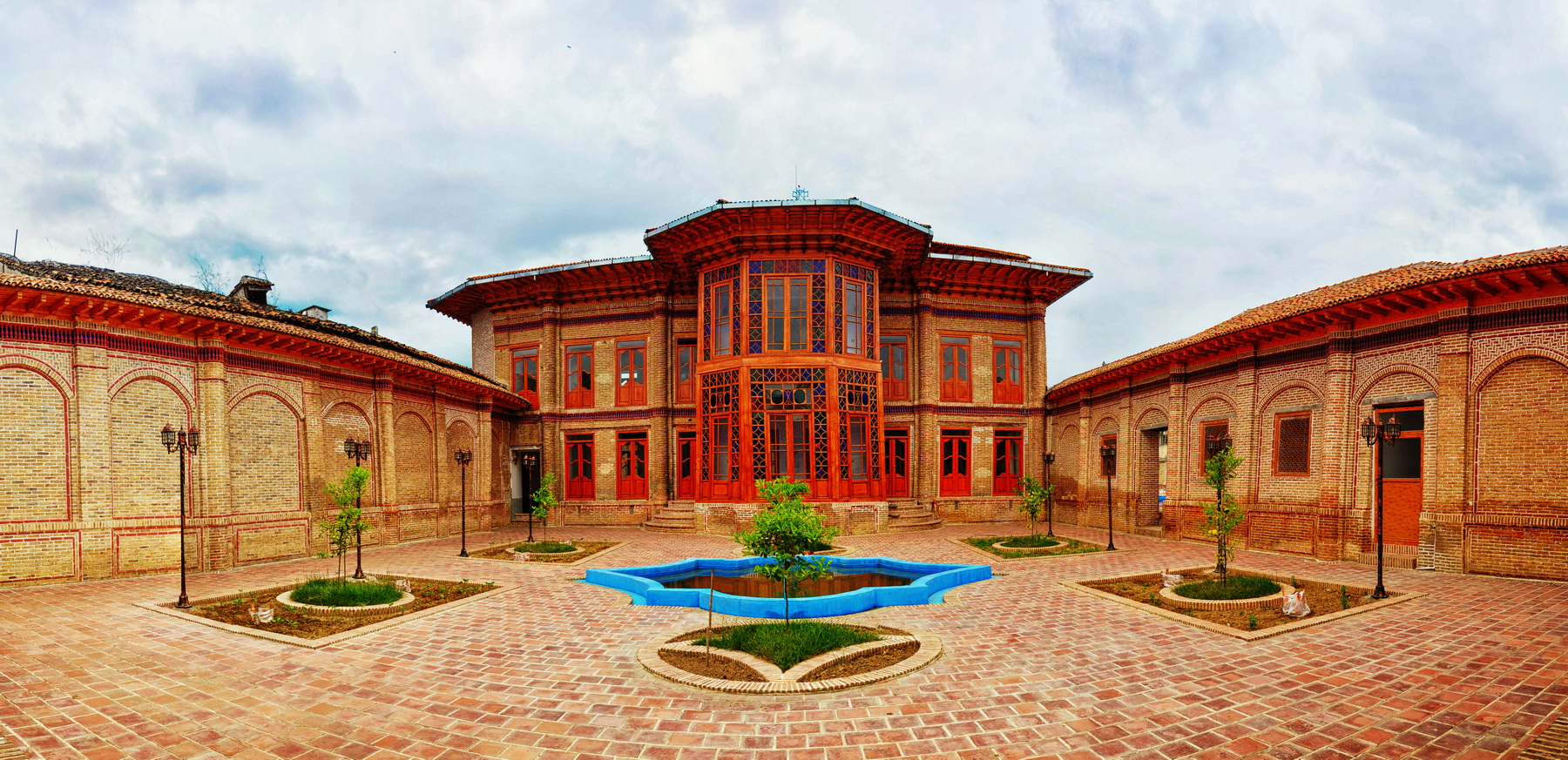
Fazeli House

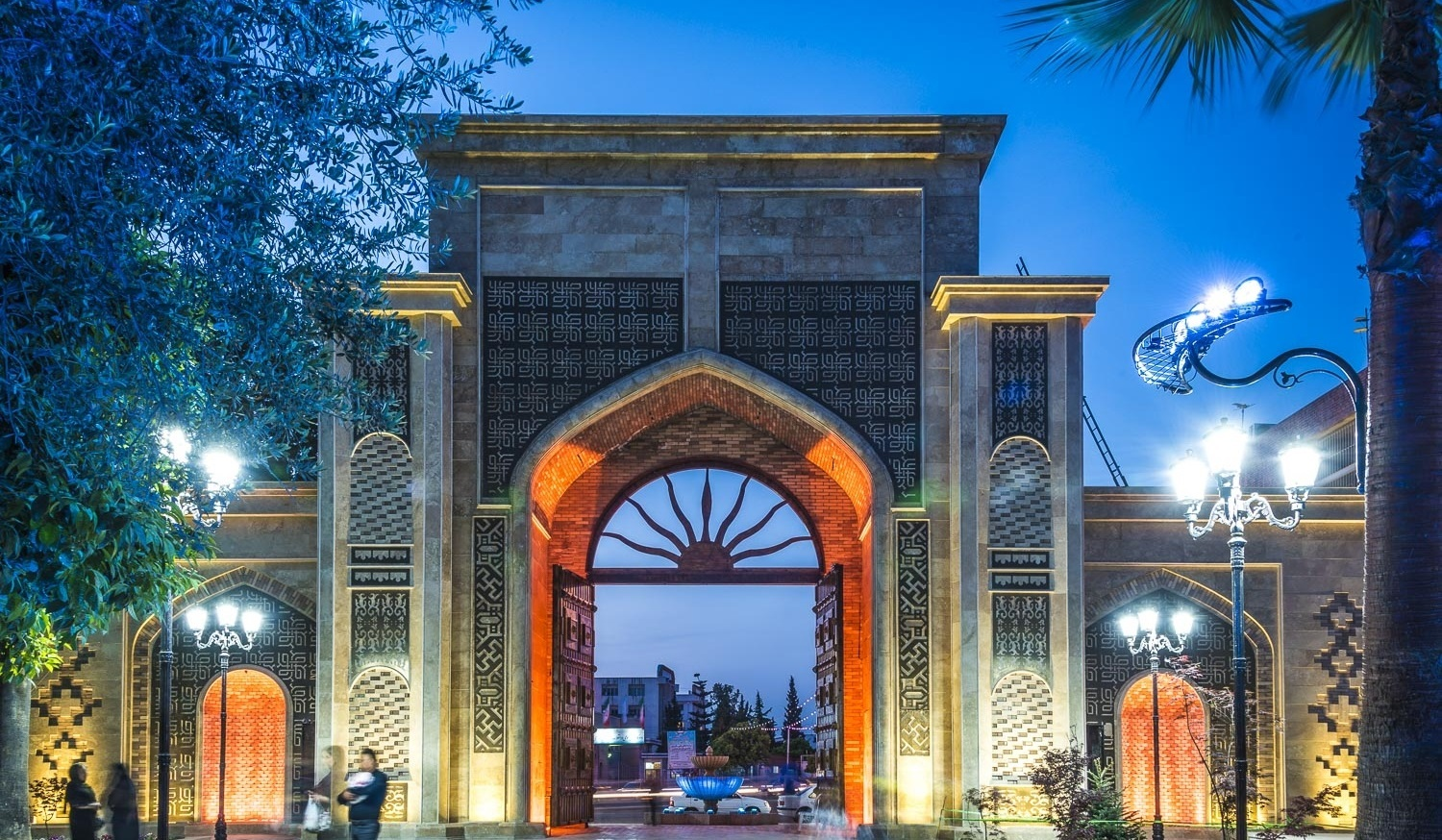
Velayat Park

Although Sari is the most important cultural place in the north of Iran, earthquakes and other causes destroyed most of its cultural heritage and ancient monuments. Still, Sari has been described as Safa City (City of Curvet).
Notable are Famous Houses such as Kolbadi House and Amir Divan House (Ramedani House); also the Resket Tower from the House of Karen era and the Farahabad Palace Complex from the Safavid era and historical Sari Central Mosque and tomb tower Imamzadeh Abbas.

== Arts and culture ==
Khosrow Sinai (born 19 January 1941 in Sari) a renowned film director of the country was the first Iranian film director to win an international prize after the Islamic revolution in Iran. He is also known as an Iranian scholar and has been awarded the prestigious Knight's Cross of the Order of Merit of the Republic of Poland.

=== Music ===
Seyed Abdolhossein Mokhtabad-Amrei (born 1966 in Sari) is an Iranian composer and singer of Persian Classical music. He received his vocal training under renowned and legendary maestros. Since his professional debut in 1991 (اارا), he has performed numerous concerts in Iran and abroad -- including most European countries, Southeast Asia, and North America -- and produced more than 20 albums.

=== Authors and poets ===
Sari has raised many authors and poets. Mina Assadi is probably the most famous one. She was born and raised in Sari but then moved to Tehran to study journalism and work as a journalist at newspapers like Kayhan. Today Mina Assadi lives in exile in Stockholm, Sweden. Mohsen Emadi (born 29 October 1976 in Sari) is another Persian poet and translator.

== Religious sites ==
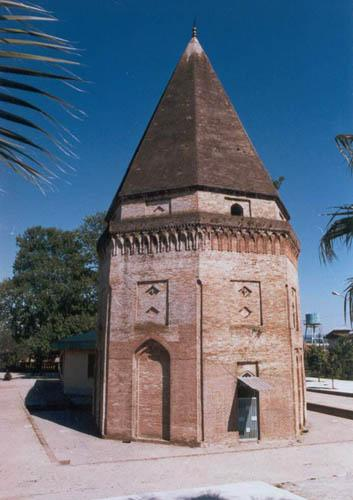
Tomb of Imamzadeh Abbas, Located in East of Sari urban area, Mazandaran.

- Emamzadeh Yahya (son of Imam Moosa-ibn Jafar)
- Emamzadeh Abbas (son of Imam Moosa-ibn Jafar)
- Emamzadeh Abdollah, Koula
- Masjed-e-Jaame' Mosque (constructed before Islam by Zoroastrians; many important kings and heroes of Persia such as Iraj, Tur, Salm, Fereydun, and Sohrab (son of Rostam, mentioned in Ferdowsi's Shahnameh) are buried near this place).
- Emam-Sajjad Mosque (formerly Shah-Qazi; was initially called the Marqad-'Ala-Adolleh School, but Rostam Shah Qazi reconstructed it in 1169 and renamed it to Shah-Qazi during the Qaznavi era)
- Haaj Mostafa Khan Mosque (Sourteci)
- Reza Khan Mosque (Hozeh Elmiyeh)
- Molla-Majd-Addin Place
- Shazdeh-Hossein Place
- Pahneh-Kalla Place

== Notable people ==
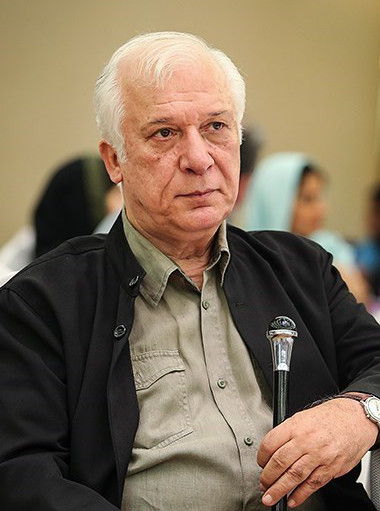
Khosrow Sinai

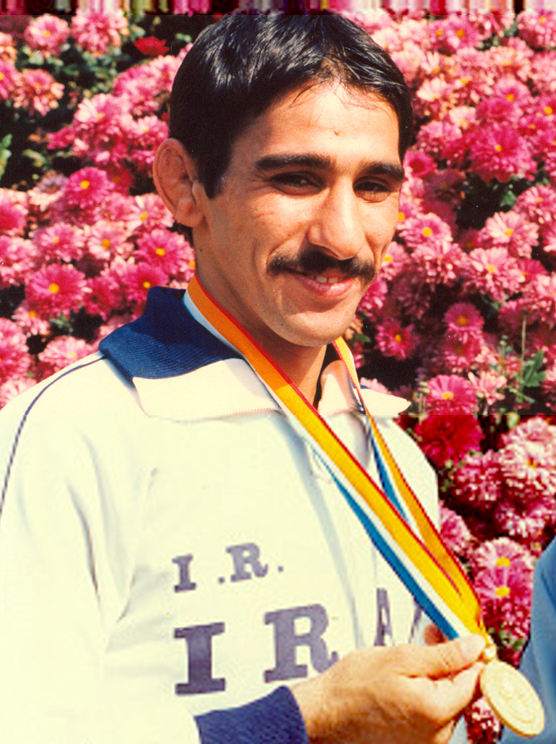
Askari Mohammadian

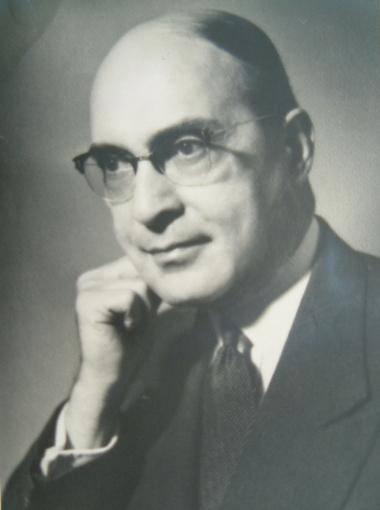
Hossein Ghods-Nakhai

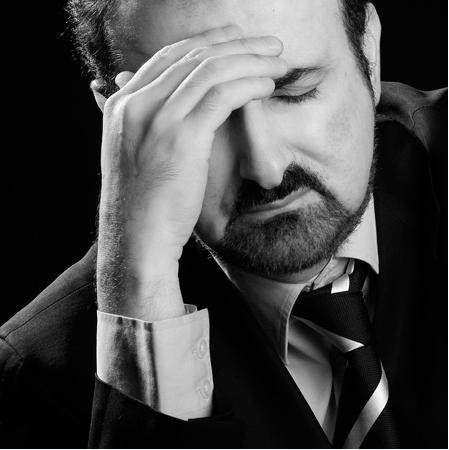
Abdolhossein Mokhtabad

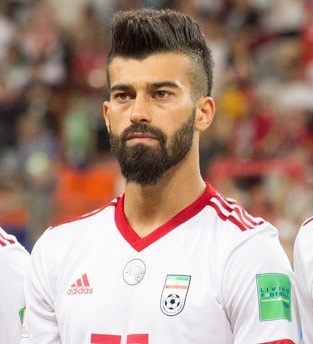
Ramin Rezaeian

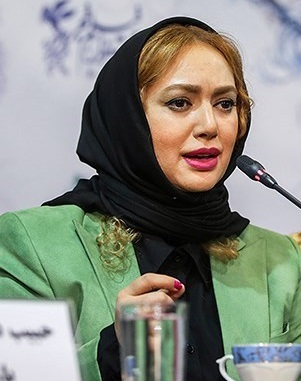
Saba Kamali

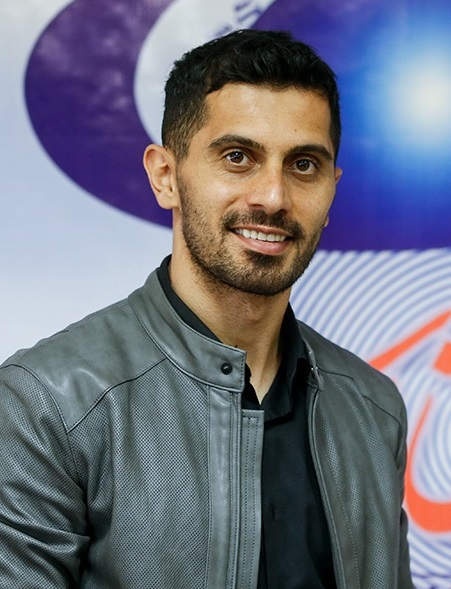
Omid Alishah

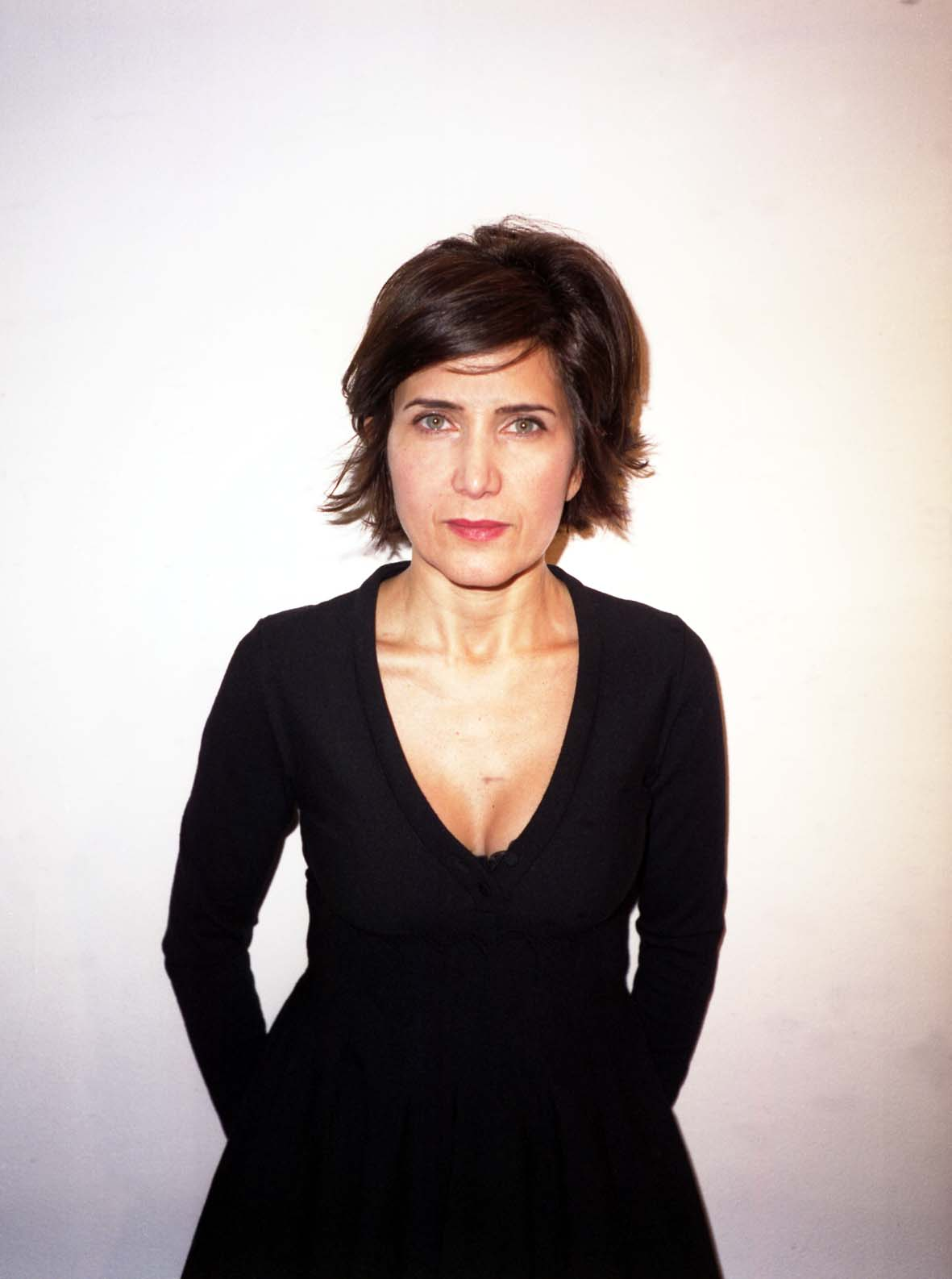
Farshid Moussavi

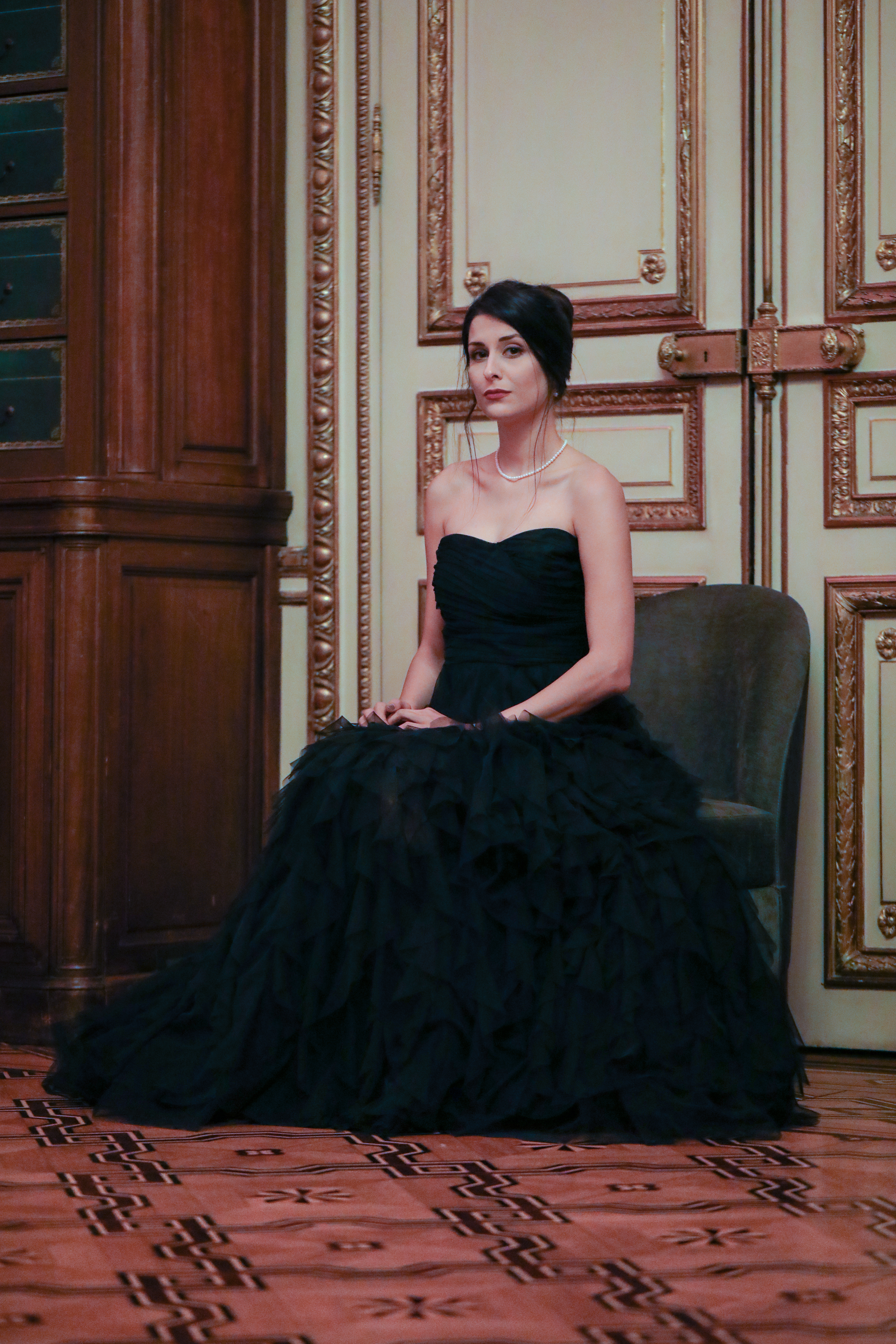
Anousha Nazari

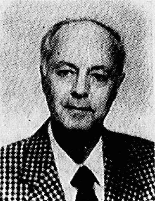
Ehsan Tabari

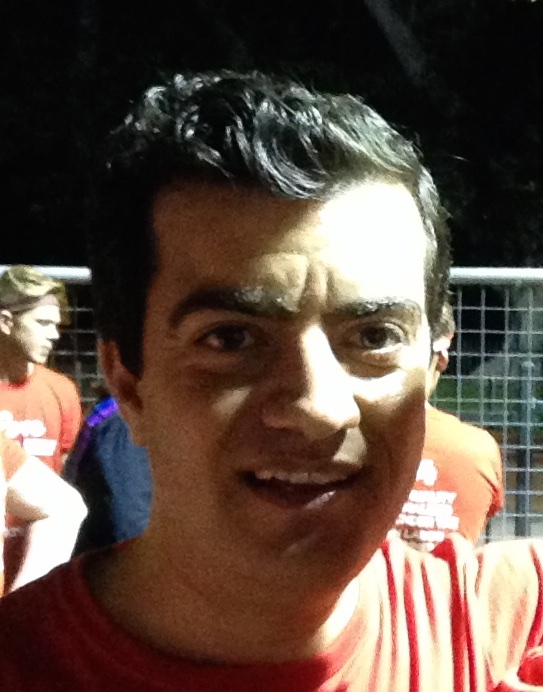
Sam Dastyari

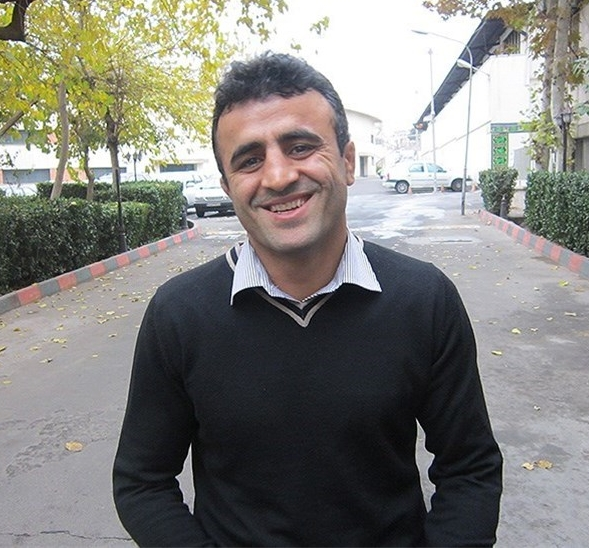
Morad Mohammadi

- Mohammad Salih al-Mazandarani (1086) - author
- Ibn Shahr Ashub - medieval jurist
- Farrukhan the Great - king
- Ali-Akbar Davar (1867-1937) - politician
- Ehsanollah Khan Dustdar (1884-1939) - politician
- Hossein Ghods-Nakhai (1911-1977) - diplomat
- Ehsan Tabari (1917-1989) - politician
- Al-Marzuban - author
- Javad Saeed (1924-1979) - politician
- Hassan Rahnavardi (1927–2023) - weightlifter and physician
- Khosrow Sinai (1940–2020) - film director
- Mohammad Donyavi (b. 1942) - singer and musician
- Mina Assadi (b. 1943) - poet
- Reza Allamehzadeh (b. 1943) - film director
- Elaheh Koulaei (b. 1956) - politician
- Hossein Mesgar Saravi (b. 1957) - football player
- Maryam Mojtahedzadeh (b. 1957) - nurse educator
- Ali Kordan (1958-2009) - politician
- Askari Mohammadian (b. 1963) - wrestler
- Farshid Moussavi (b. 1965) - architect
- Majid Torkan (b. 1965) - wrestler
- Abdolhossein Mokhtabad (b. 1966) - singer
- Zinat Pirzadeh (b. 1967) - actress, writer, comedian
- Ali Nazari Juybari (b. 1967) - football administrator
- Seyed Abolhassan Mokhtabad (1970–2023) - journalist
- Mohsen Emadi (b. 1976) - poet
- Ebrahim Taghipour (b. 1976) - football player
- Saba Kamali (b. 1976) - actor
- Pedram Roushan (b. 1978) - physicist
- Morad Mohammadi (b. 1980) - wrestler
- Mohammad Taghavi (b. 1980) - football coach
- Behdad Esfahbod (b. 1982) - software engineer
- Sam Dastyari (b. 1983) - Australian politician
- Hossein Rajabian (b. 1984) - Filmmaker- Photographer- Writer
- Rouhollah Arab (b. 1984) - football player
- Sheys Rezaei (b. 1984) - football player
- Mehdi Momeni (b. 1985) - football player
- Abbas Dabbaghi (b. 1987) - wrestler
- Mohammad Reza Barari (b. 1988) - weightlifter
- Hanieh Rostamian (b.1998) - sports shooter pistol
- Taha Mortazavi (b. 1988) - futsal player
- Mehdi Rajabian (b. 1989) - singer
- Anousha Nazari (b. 1990) - singer
- Mohammad Abbaszadeh (b. 1990) - football player
- Ramin Rezaeian (b. 1991) - football player
- Omid Alishah (b. 1992) - football player
- Mohammad Hossein Mohammadian (b. 1992) - wrestler
- Mohsen Karimi (b. 1994) - football player
- Mohammad Karimi (b.1996) - football player
- Saeid Sadeghi (b.1994)-football player
- Danial Esmaeilifar (b.1993) - football player
- Saman Fallah (b.2001) - football player

== Sister cities ==
- (Iraq) Najaf
- (Belarus) Gomel
- (Russia) Astrakhan
- (Italy) Ancona
- (Iran) Mezdeh
- (India) Navsari
- (Iran) Karaj
- (Tanzania) Dar es Salaam

== See also ==
- Nav Sari (New Sari), city in Gujarat, India, traditionally named so by Parsis

Media related to Sari, Iran at Wikimedia Commons
