= Pedram Roushan =

Iranian-american physicist

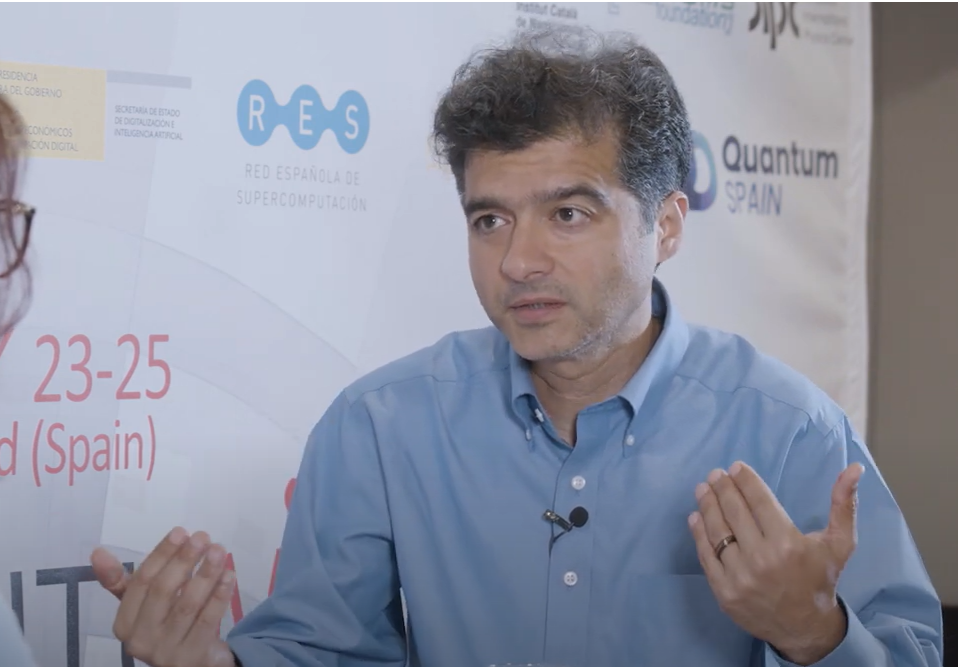
- Roushan in QUANTMatter 2023, Madrid
- Born: 1978 (age 47–48); Sari, Iran
- Education: University of Pittsburgh, Princeton University (Ph.D.)
- Scientific career
- Fields: Quantum physics, quantum information science
- Workplaces: Princeton University, University of California, Santa Barbara, Google AI
- Thesis: Visualizing Surface States of Topological Insulators with Scanning Tunneling Microscopy (2011)
- Doctoral advisor: Ali Yazdani
- Website: research.google/people/108435/

Pedram Roushan is a research scientist working at Google AI on quantum computing and quantum simulation.

== Biography ==
Pedram Roushan was born in Sari, Iran in 1978 and raised in Iran. His family belonged to the Baháʼí Faith and suffered prosecution and discrimination after the Islamic Revolution. Roushan's parents were laid-off from their jobs due to their beliefs, and his father had to spend several years in hiding. In 1984, to escape persecution, he and his family lived in a small village close to Gilan province, where Roushan attended elementary school. In 1996, Roushan was denied access to Iranian universities. He enrolled at the Baháʼí Institute for Higher Education, where he obtained a degree in civil engineering.

In 2001 and with the help of the Hebrew Immigration Aid Society (HIAS), he moved to the US as a religious refugee and attended the University of Pittsburgh, where he graduated summa cum laude in 2005. He completed his PhD in the group of Ali Yazdani at Princeton University in 2011, where he studies diluted magnetic semiconductors and also performed the first scanning tunneling microscopy on the surface of topological insulators. He then moved to the University of California, Santa Barbara as a postdoc, where he worked in John Martinis' group on building a quantum computer based on superconducting qubits. In 2014 he joined Google together with the Martinis team and was part of the group performing the first claimed quantum supremacy demonstration on Google's Sycamore processor.

Roushan is a Principal Research Scientist at Google Quantum AI and leads the experimental effort on noisy intermediate scale quantum (NISQ) algorithms, focusing on simulating quantum phenomena on NISQ processors. With his team and their collaborators, they have studied information scrambling in quantum circuits, non-equilibrium dynamics and universality classes in quantum spin models, phases of matter away from equilibrium, e.g. time crystals and measurement-induced entanglement phases, quantum statistics of abelian and non-abelian excitations of the Kitaev toric code model. At the 18th Capri Spring School in 2024, he coined the term "discoverino" to refer to small discoveries first made by NISQ devices, but could also be made in theory or by using substantial classical computing resources.

== Publications (selected) ==
- McEwen, M; Faoro, L; Arya, K; et al. (2022). "Resolving catastrophic error bursts from cosmic rays in large arrays of superconducting qubits". Nature Physics. 18 (1): 107–111. arXiv:2104.05219. Bibcode:2022NatPh..18..107M. doi:10.1038/s41567-021-01432-8.
- Mi, X; Ippoliti, M; Quintana, C; et al. (2021). "Time-crystalline eigenstate order on a quantum processor". Nature. 601 (7894): 531–536. arXiv:2107.13571. Bibcode:2022Natur.601..531M. doi:10.1038/s41586-021-04257-w. PMC 8791837. PMID 34847568.
- Mi, X; Roushan, P; Quintana, C; et al. (2021). "Information scrambling in quantum circuits". Science. 374 (6574): 1479–1483. arXiv:2101.08870. Bibcode:2021Sci...374.1479M. doi:10.1126/science.abg5029. PMID 34709938.
- Satzinger, K; Liu, Y.-J.; Smith, A; et al. (2021). "Realizing topologically ordered states on a quantum processor". Science. 374 (6572): 1237–1241. arXiv:2104.01180. Bibcode:2021Sci...374.1237S. doi:10.1126/science.abi8378. PMID 34855491.
- Arute, Frank; Arya, Kunal; Babbush, Ryan; et al. (2019). "Quantum supremacy using a programmable superconducting processor". Nature. 574 (7779): 505–510. arXiv:1910.11333. Bibcode:2019Natur.574..505A. doi:10.1038/s41586-019-1666-5. PMID 31645734.
- Roushan, P.; Neill, C.; Tangpanitanon, J.; et al. (2017). "Spectroscopic signatures of localization with interacting photons in superconducting qubits". Science. 358 (6367): 1175–1179. arXiv:1709.07108. Bibcode:2017Sci...358.1175R. doi:10.1126/science.aao1401. PMID 29191906.
- O'Malley, PJJ; Babbush, R; Kivlichan, ID; et al. (2016). "Scalable quantum simulation of molecular energies". Physical Review X. 6 (3) 031007. arXiv:1512.06860. Bibcode:2016PhRvX...6c1007O. doi:10.1103/PhysRevX.6.031007.
- Kelly, J; Barends, R; Fowler, A G; et al. (2015). "State preservation by repetitive error detection in a superconducting quantum circuit". Nature. 519 (7541): 66–69. arXiv:1411.7403. Bibcode:2015Natur.519...66K. doi:10.1038/nature14270. PMID 25739628.
- Barends, R; Kelly, J; Megrant, A; et al. (2014). "Superconducting quantum circuits at the surface code threshold for fault tolerance". Nature. 508 (7497): 500–503. arXiv:1402.4848. Bibcode:2014Natur.508..500B. doi:10.1038/nature13171. PMID 24759412.
- Hor, YS; Williams, AJ; Checkelsky, JG; et al. (2010). "Superconductivity in Cu_{x}Bi_{2}Se_{3} and its Implications for Pairing in the Undoped Topological Insulator". Physical Review Letters. 104 (5) 057001. arXiv:0909.2890. Bibcode:2010PhRvL.104e7001H. doi:10.1103/PhysRevLett.104.057001. PMID 20366785.
- Hor, Y S; Roushan, P; Beidenkopf, H; et al. (2010). "Development of ferromagnetism in the doped topological insulator Bi_{2−x}Mn_{x}Te_{3}". Physical Review B. 81 (19) 195203. arXiv:1001.4834. doi:10.1103/PhysRevB.81.195203. S2CID 11760202.
- Roushan, P; Seo, J; Parker, CV; et al. (2009). "Topological surface states protected from backscattering by chiral spin texture". Nature. 460 (7259): 1106–1109. arXiv:0908.1247. Bibcode:2009Natur.460.1106R. doi:10.1038/nature08308. PMID 19668187. S2CID 205217990.
- Hor, Y S; Richardella, A; Roushan, P; et al. (2009). "p-type Bi_{2}Se_{3} for topological insulator and low-temperature thermoelectric applications". Physical Review B. 79 (19) 195208. arXiv:0903.4406. Bibcode:2009PhRvB..79s5208H. doi:10.1103/PhysRevB.79.195208.
