= Abdolhossein Mokhtabad =

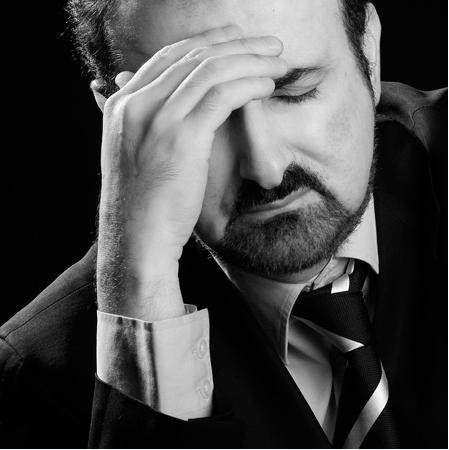

Background information
- Born: Seyed Abdolhossein Mokhtabad
- Origin: Iranian
- Education: Goldsmiths, University of London (PhD)
- Genre: Iranian classic
- Occupations: Singer, composer
- Years active: 1992–present
- Website: www.smokhtabad.com

Abdolhossein Mokhtabad (Persian: سید عبدالحسین مختاباد, born 21 March 1966) is an Iranian singer and composer of Persian traditional music. He is a Gold Medal Winner of Global Music Awards in 2020 and Silver Medal Winner in 2022.

== Career ==
Mokhtabad's works are in the classical Persian style of Radif. He is also a player of the santur, setar, tonbak, and piano. After performing several concerts in Iran, and in countries abroad such as Greece, France, Netherlands, Switzerland, the UK, Sweden, Italy, Spain, Austria, Malaysia, Algeria, Oman, Canada, and the United States, he produced a variety of albums. Mokhtabad left Iran in 1998 to study Western classical music. After two years of studying for his B.A. at the University Of Ottawa in Ottawa, Ontario, Canada, he later went on to pursue his M.A. and doctorate degrees at Goldsmiths, University of London. Mokhtabad completed his Ph.D. in Western Composition and Ethnomusicology under Stanley Glasser and John Baily at Goldsmiths, University of London in 2008.

Mokhtabad currently resides in Tehran.

== Education ==
- 2008: Ph.D. in Music, Goldsmiths, University of London
- 1984–89: Tehran University B.A, Sociology
- 1980–84: 29th of Aban High school, Sari, Iran Diploma, Economic
- 1984–93: Vocal training and mastery of the Iranian 12 Modal suites with Ostad Karim Saleh Azimi (Iranian Radio Music Department)
- 1988–91: Learn Setar at School of Music of the Art Organization for Islamic Culture
- 1984–86: Learn santur & Tombak
- Art Center of Organization for Islamic Culture

== Experience ==
- 1997-8 Member of the Music Council
- 2014 Dean of College of Art & Architecture of Islamic Azad University Central Tehran Branch
- 2013 Member of Tehran City Council (Elected by People of Tehran)
- 2007 Member of Board of Directors of Iranian Music Association
- 2006-8 The cultural and artistic adviser of President of Iranian Technical & Vocational Training Organization (TVTO)
- 2005-7 The Cultural and Music Adviser and Head of Regional music in IRIB
- 2005 Lecturer in Music Department of Iranian Radio and Television Organization
- 1998 Lecturer The College of Iranian Radio and Television Organization (On leave with fellowship to pursue graduate study)
- 1997-8 Member of the Music Council Iranian Radio and Television Organization
- 1996-7 Director, SarV Cultural Center, Municipality 6 of the Tehran Metropolis
- 1996–97 Member of Music Council of UNESCO in Iran

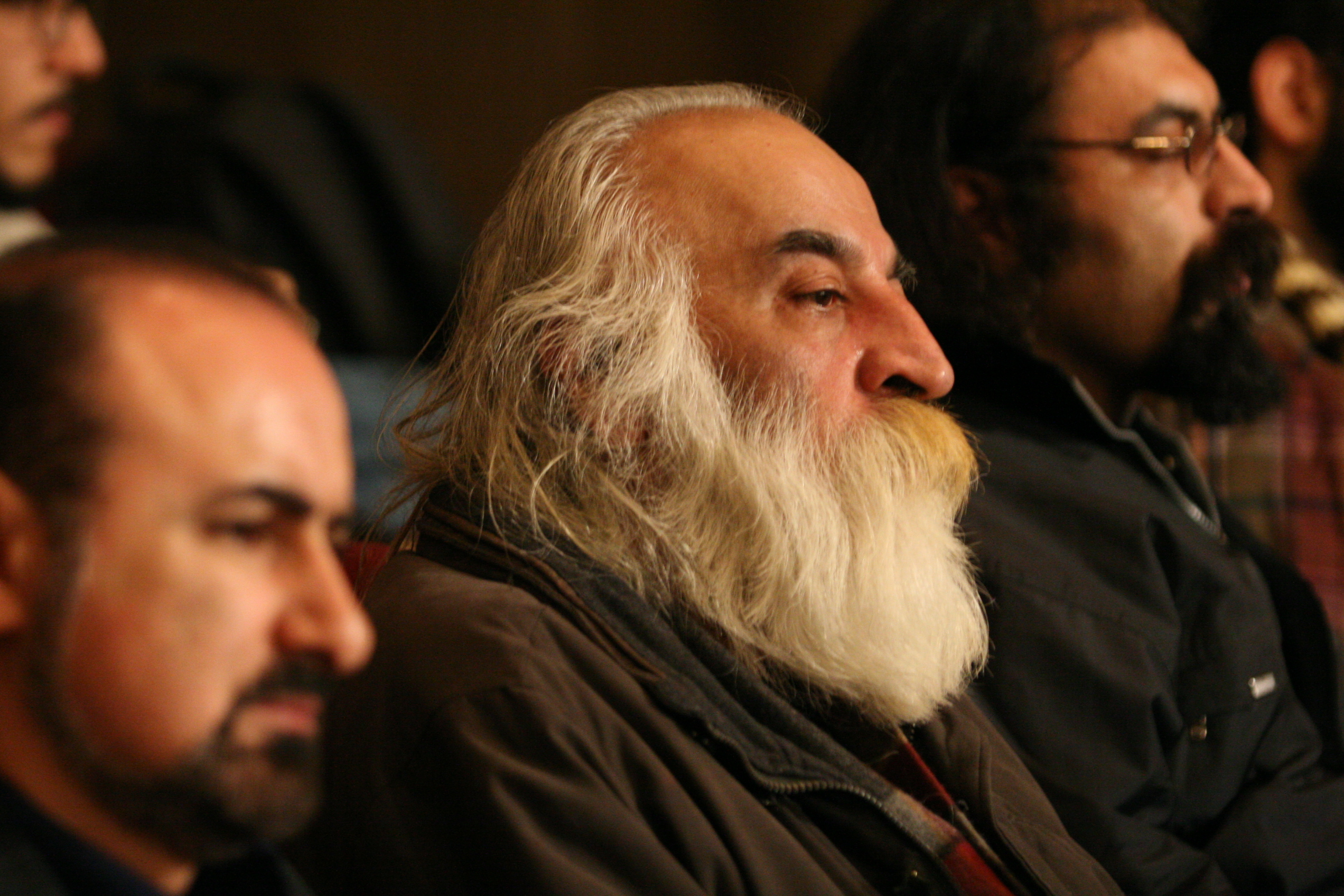
Abdolhossein Mokhtabad and Mohammad Reza Lotfi

== Professional Work ==
=== Tapes and CDs (albums and singles) ===
- "Tork e Khtaa" – Singer and Composer. Single, 2024.
- "That Moments" – Singer and Composer. Single, 2024.
- Siah Mashgh – Collection of Iranian traditional songs, 2016
- Sayeh Doost – Composition and vocal performance, CD & Cassette, 2012
- Mah e Majles – Composition and vocal performance, CD & Cassette, 2007
- Sepid o Siyahí – Collection of songs, vocal performance, CD & Cassette, 2006
- Behesht e Man – Composition and vocal performance, CD & Cassette
- Rangin Kaman e Eshgh – Vocal performance and song, CD & Cassette
- Ghasedak – Vocal performance and song, CD & Cassette, 2002
- Ghoghay-e Jan – Vocal performance and song, CD & Cassette, 1998
- Hamnava – Vocal performance and song, 1998
- Naz -o Niyaz – Composition and vocal performance 1998
- Zouragh-e Mahtab – Collection of songs, CD & Cassette, 1997
- Saqi-e Rezvan – Collection of songs, CD & Cassette, 1997
- Dagh-e Tanhaee – Vocal performance and song, Cassette, 1996
- Boy-e Gol – Composition, Vocal performance and song, 1995
- Shekveh – Composition, Vocal performance and song, CD & Cassette, 1995
- Safar-e Eshq – Vocal performance and song, CD & Cassette, 1994
- Tamana-ye Vesal – Composition, Vocal performance and song, CD & Cassette, 1993

=== Performances ===
- 2026 – Tehran; Vahadat Hull; "those moments" Two nights; 29-30 October; Iranian Philharmonic Orchestra; Conductor Master HOMAYOUN Rahimian
- 2025 – Sari City ; Donyay e Arezo Complex Hall; Big Concert; May 13.
- 2025 – Sari City; Badeleh Hotel; Nobang e Mehr Band; May 11.
- 2025 – Hamadan City; Boo Ali Complex; Nobang e Mehr Band; January 23.
- 2024 – Sari City; City Town Hall; Shoorangiz Band; November 12.
- 2024 – Babol City; City Hall; Shoorangiz Band; November 7th.
- 2024 – Tehran Vahdat Hall; Iranian National Orchestra; Conducted by Homayoun Rahimian; June 9-10.
- 2018 – Tehran Vahdat Hall, Nobang e Mehr big band, accompanied voice Saba Mokhtabad.
- 2017 – Sari Rasool Hosseini Stadium (Folklore Band).
- 2017 – Tehran Milaad, with Roodaki big band (2 nights).
- 2016 – Tehran Milaad Hall, with Roodaki big band (2 nights).
- 2015 – Tehran Milaad Hall, with Roodaki big band (3 nights).
- 2014 – Japan, Tokyo, for Nowrooz Celebration.
- 2014 – Russia, Moscow, Kazan (Tataristan).
- 2013 – Turkey, Konya City, Arus Celebration, on the Path of Mevlana.
- 2013 – France (Paris) and Italy (Rom), Rudaki Orchestra, for Nowruz Celebration.
- 2012 – Iran, Sari, Rudaki Orchestra, for Behshar City's Flooding Victims.
- 2012 – Kazakhstan (Astana, Symphonic Orchestra of Kazakhstan).
- 2011 – USA (Houston, Los Angelis).
- 2011 – Canada (Montreal, Ottawa, Toronto).
- 2010 – Malaysia (Kuala Lumpur & Johor Bahru).
- 2010 – US (LA, San-Francisco).
- 2010 – Canada (Toronto, Ottawa, Montreal).
- 2010 – Tehran (Milaad Hull).
- 2010 – Azerbaijan (Baku).
- 2010 – Italy (Rome, Milan).
- 2009 – Spain (Madrid), Austria (Vienna), and Iranian Symphonic Orchestra at Vahdat Hall.
- 2008 – Kuwait (Qurain Music Festival), Tehran Vahdat Hual.
- 2007 – Kuwait, Algeria, Tehran (Saad Abaad Palace and Fajr Music Festival).
- 2006 – Concert, London, Paris (in UNESCO), Turkey (Rumi Festival) and Moscow.
- 2005 – Concert, London.
- 2004 – Concert, Tehran (Fajr Festival).
- 2003 – Concert, London, Tehran, Isfahan.
- 2002 – Concert, Chelsea Town Hall, London.
- 2001 – Concert, Gothenburg.
- 2001 – Concert, Vienna.
- 2001 – Concert, Royal festival Hall London.
- 2000 – Concert and presentation, Durham University.England.
- 2000 – Concert, Manchester City Hull,England.
- 2000 – Concert, Iran, Rudaki Hall.
- 2000 – Concert, U.S.A. Texas.
- 1999 – Concert, Ottawa, and Toronto, Canada..
- 1998 – Concert, Amsterdam and The Hague, the Netherlands.
- 1998 – Concert, Paris for UNESCO, France.
- 1997 – Concert, Montreal, Ottawa and Toronto, Canada.
- 1997 – Concert, Leeds, London and Oxford, England.
- 1996 – Concert, Dubai, UAE.
- 1996 – Concert, Muscat, Oman.
- 1995 – Concert, Ashgabat, Turkmenistan.
- 1995 – Concert, Dushanbe, Tajikistan.
- 1994 – Concert, Vienna, Austria.
- 1994 – Concert, Kuala Lumpur, Malaysia
- 1993 – Concert, Thessalonica and Athens, Greece.
- 1992-00 – More than 30 concerts in Tehran and other Iranian cities.

== Essays and workshops ==
- 2000 Essay, "History of the Persian Popular Music" "Encyclopaedia of the Popular Music of the World" The Continuum International Publishing Group Ltd.
- 2020 Book, "Iranian Contemporary Art Music", Gooya Publication
- 2022 Book "Postmodern Music/ Postmodern Thought", Edited by Judy Luchhead & Joseph Auner, Translated into Persian by Abdolhossein Mokhtabad, Gooya Publication, Tehran, Iran.
