= Anousha Nazari =

Anousha Nazari آنوشا نظری
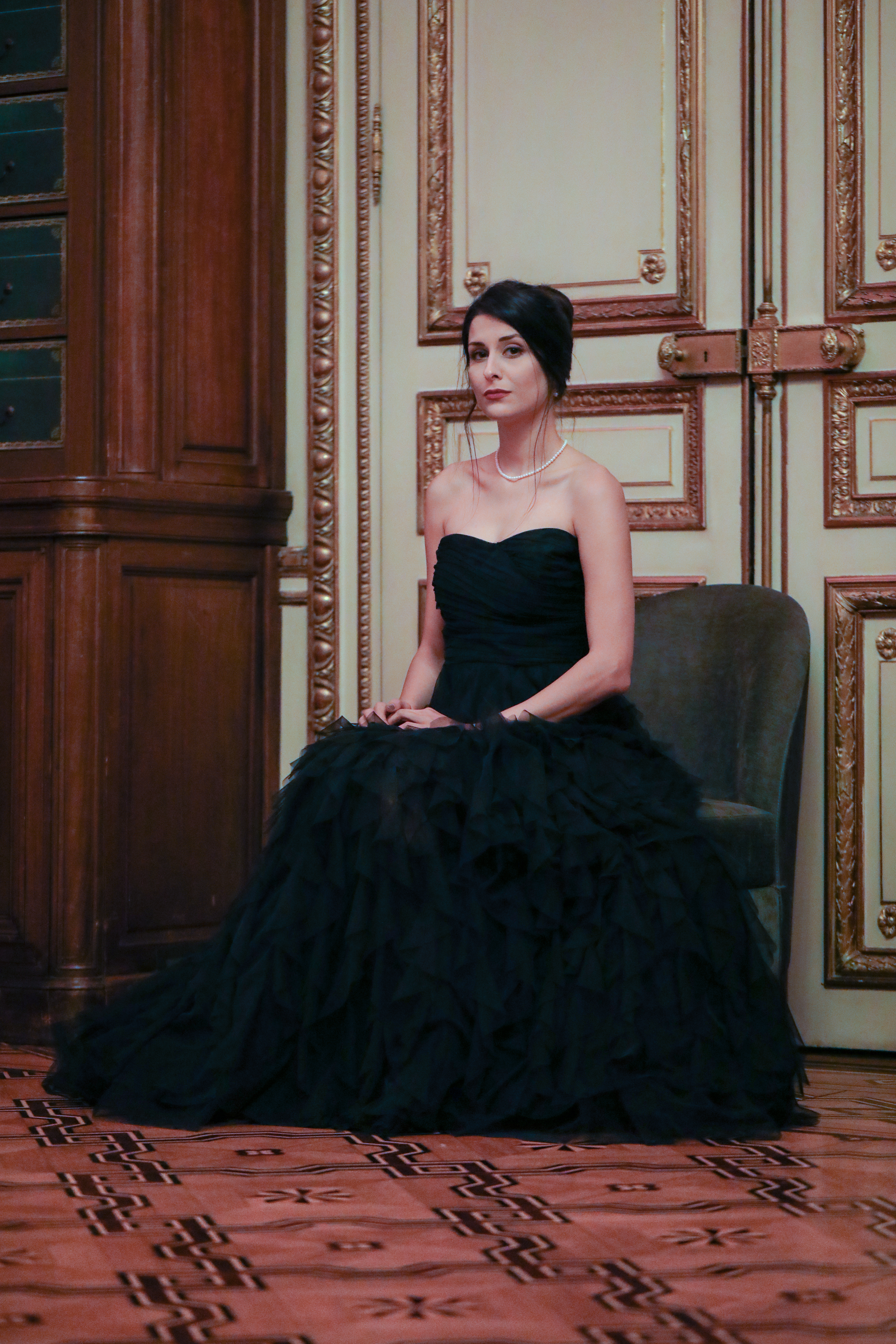

Background information
- Born: Sari, Iran
- Genres: Classical
- Occupation: Mezzo-soprano
- Website: www.anoushanazari.com

Anousha Nazari (Persian: آنوشا نظری) is an Iranian mezzo-soprano classical singer born on January 6 in Sari, Iran.

== Biography ==
Nazari began singing in local orchestras before joining the Sonata Philharmonic Orchestra & Choir Ensemble. She began her musical training at the conservatory while studying architecture at the university, from which she graduated in 2012. She won the International Prize at the Fajr International Music Festival (choir section) in 2013 and 2014, and participated in national and international festivals.

In 2014, she was selected by the Tehran Symphony Orchestra, then under the direction of Alexander Rahbari.

Based in France since 2016, she joined the lyrical singing section of the Conservatoire à rayonnement régional de Cergy-Pontoise, where she completed her education in music and singing.

After performing in concert halls across Iran ( Salle Vahdat, Arasbaran, Milad &...), she continues her career on Parisian and European stages ( Opéra national de Paris, Théâtre des Champs-Élysées, Salle Cortot, École des Beaux-Arts de Paris, Musée national des arts asiatiques Guimet, Hôtel de Lauzun, Musée français de la carte à jouer, Amphithéâtre Richelieu de la Sorbonne, Institut du monde arabe, Cité internationale universitaire de Paris), Philharmonie am Gasteig à Munich,Hermann-Levi-Saal in Gießen, Rathaus Laubach Friedrichstraße in Laubach where she collaborates with various artists and musicians such as Jean-Claude Carrière, Nahal Tajadod, Leili Anvar, Julie Gayet, Sonia Wieder-Atherton, Shani Diluka.

Her international career has also led her to perform in China, France, Germany, England, Cyprus, Thailand and Switzerland, contributing to her visibility on the international artistic scene.

On the occasion of the 30th anniversary of the creation of the editorial staff and the International Day of Nowrouz, at the request of the RFI, she presented Fire Temple.

His debut album Sounds of Ancestors was produced and released in March 2021 by the Samuel Jordan Center for Persian Studies & Culture at the University of California. In this music album, she has performed pieces by Iranian composers such as André Hossein, Morteza Hannaneh, Samin Baghtcheban & M. S. Sharifian.

In April 2021, she participated with 20 artists from around the world in the musical project 20 Chansons et Berceuses du monde produced and published by Joyvox Éditions and Sony music.

Anousha Nazari's second album, titled In Vino Veritas. Hommage à Khayam, was produced and published in 2024 by Gondishapour in partnership with the Société Nationale des Beaux Arts . This album, composed for lyrical vocals, clarinet and piano, brings together compositions by four Iranian composers—Rouzbeh Rafie, Aso Kohzadi, Basir Faghih Nasiri, and Mehdi Panahi—of the new generation in homage to Omar Khayyam, the 11th century poet. The album explores themes such as wine, love and the quest for the present moment, which are central to Khayyam 's work.

She is the co-founder of the French Association Gondishapour.

On March 26, 2022, Anousha Nazari and Sepand Dadbeh, bring to life a legendary Persian love story during a musical performance in the National Museum of Asian Arts - Guimet in Paris. This lyrical creation, dedicated to the Persian loves of Princess Shirin and King Khosrow, is inspired by the poems of Nizami, dating from the 12th century.

On March 8, 2023, on the occasion of International Women's Rights Day, Anousha Nazari presents You're the One I Desire at the Théâtre des Champs-Élysées in Paris.

Anousha Nazari, in collaboration with pianist Shani Diluka and cellist Sonia Wieder-Atherton, as well as actress Julie Gayet, participated in an artistic project Mèches de feu . This project took place on May 22, 2023 at the Cité de la Musique-Philharmonie de Paris . It consisted of a concert accompanied by a reading of poems, organized in five acts. The performances combined classical music with the poetry of Garous Abdolmalekian.

Anousha Nazari was a jury member for several institutions, including the 160th edition of the Société Nationale des Beaux-Arts and the Global Encounters Festival of the Aga Khan Development Network.

== Discography ==
- 2021 : Sounds of Ancestors
- 2021 : 20 Chansons et Berceuses du monde
- 2024 : In Vino Veritas. Hommage à Khayam

== Videography ==
- 2022 : Fire Temple (Khosrow & Shirin)
- 2022 : Torrents d'amour
- 2022 : L'Eraclito amoroso
- 2023 : You're the One I Desire
- 2023 : Krunk
- 2023 : Omaggio a Saadi
- 2023 : Mèches de feu
- 2023 : Freedom
- 2023 : The Candle of dawn
- 2023 : Bé Sahra
- 2024 : Flow My Tears
- 2024 : Mélodies Persanes Op. 26: La brise
- 2025 : Lascia ch’io pianga
- 2025 : Tâ Bé Kéy Âzâr
- 2025 : In Darkness Let Me Dwell

== Singles ==
- 2022 : Fire Temple (Khosrow & Shirin)
- 2022 : L'Eraclito amoroso
- 2023 : Woman, Life, Freedom
- 2023 : Chera
- 2023 : Freedom
- 2023 : Bé Sahra
- 2024 : Flow My Tears
- 2024 : Mélodies Persanes Op. 26: La brise
- 2025 : Lascia ch’io pianga
- 2025 : Tâ Bé Kéy Âzâr
