= Kolbadi House =

Kolbadi House (Farsi; خانه کلبادی) It is a historic house dating back to the Qajar era, located in Sari, Iran.

== History ==
The mansion was commissioned by Sardar Jalil, a military commander of the time, and was later inherited by his son, Manouchehr Khan Kolbadi.

== Museum ==
The building currently functions as an ethnographic museum, where visitors can explore aspects of the cultural heritage and history of the surrounding region in Mazandaran province.

== Structure ==
The structure is characterised by a rectangular layout divided into two principal sections: an inner (andaruni) and an outer (biruni) area. It has two storeys and the outer section contains a courtyard. It features architectural elements such as carved wooden ornamentation and clay-tiled roofing.
