= Zinat Pirzadeh =

Swedish comedian

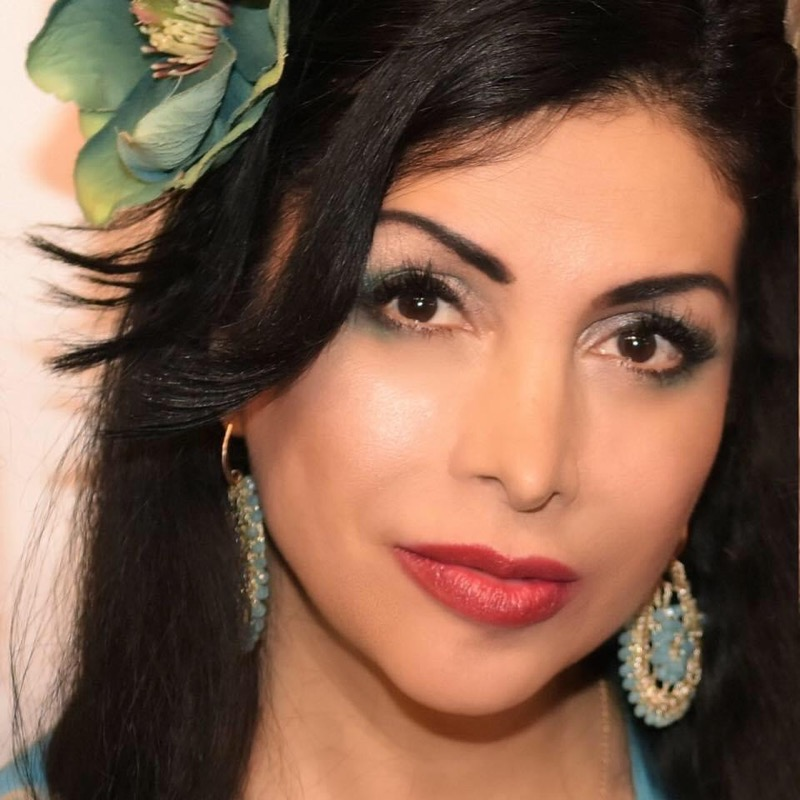
- Born: Zinat Pirzadeh; 22 February 1967 (age 59); Sari, Iran
- Occupations: Actress; writer; poet; comedian; human rights activist
- Years active: 2003–present

Zinat Pirzadeh (born 22 February 1967), is an Iranian-Swedish female comedian, actress and writer. She has been called the "funniest female immigrant in Sweden." Her butterfly novel trilogy starting with Fjäril i koppel (Butterfly on a leash) (2011) has been translated into Polish and Norwegian. The second installment Vinterfjäril (Winter's Butterfly) was released in 2020.
