= John Baily (ethnomusicologist) =

British ethnomusicologist

- Born: 1943 (age 82–83); Glastonbury, Somerset
- Education: University of Oxford, Queen's University of Belfast (Ph.D. in social anthropology), University of Sussex (D.Phil. in experimental psychology)
- Spouse: Veronica Doubleday
- Scientific career
- Institutions: Goldsmiths, University of London

John Baily (born 1943) is a British ethnomusicologist and emeritus Professor of Ethnomusicology at Goldsmiths, University of London. He is known for his work on the music of Afghanistan and has taught at the Queen’s University of Belfast, Columbia University and Goldsmiths.

== Works ==
- War, Exile and the Music of Afghanistan The Ethnographer’s Tale, Routledge 2015
- Music of Afghanistan: Professional Musicians in the City of Herat. Cambridge University Press 1988
- Afghanistan: The Rubâb of Herat. Mohammad Rahim Khushnawaz, rubâb. Recordings and commentary by John Baily. Archives internationales de musique populaire AIMP XXV. Disques VDE-Gallo CD-699. One compact disc with 27-page booklet in French and English, 1993.
