= Ehsan Tabari =

Iranian politician (1917–1989)

- احسان طبری
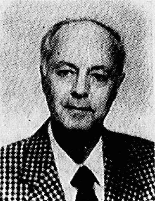
- Tabari in 1979
- Born: 8 February 1917; Sari, Sublime State of Iran
- Died: 29 April 1989 (aged 72); Tehran, Iran
- Political party: Tudeh Party

Ehsan Tabari (Persian: احسان طبری; 8 February 1917 – 29 April 1989) was an Iranian philosopher, poet, and literary figure who contributed to the modernization of literature and cultural debates in twentieth-century Iran. He also promoted the study of Marxist philosophy in the country. A founding member and theoretician of the Tudeh Party of Iran, he participated actively in its political activities, which advocated social reform and economic equality.

== Biography ==
Tabari was born on 8 February 1917 in Sari, Qajar Iran. He was fluent in 7 languages and known for his work in writing and translating poetry, as well as conducting research in linguistics.

He joined the Tudeh Party when it was formed in 1941 and fled to the Soviet Union when it was declared illegal a few years later, working as an announcer for Radio Moscow. He later moved to East Germany, got a doctorate in philosophy in Berlin, and taught at German universities.

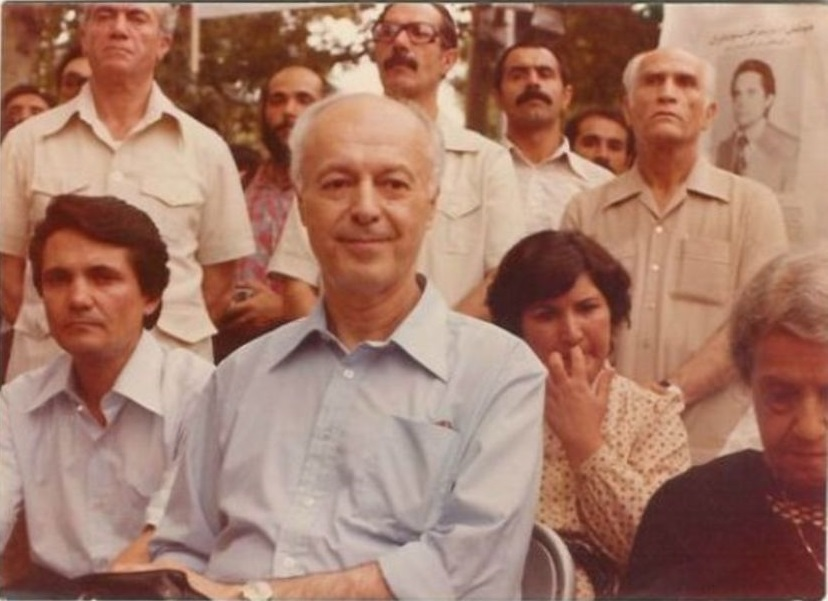
Ehsan Tabari (center) among fellow members of the Tudeh Party, circa late 1970s

He returned to Iran in 1979 after the Iranian Revolution overthrew Mohammad Reza Shah. In 1983, he was arrested along with other leaders of the Tudeh Party of Iran. In May 1983, after being subjected to severe physical and psychological torture in prison without access to legal representation—including months of solitary confinement—the Islamic Republic of Iran presented him to the public, claiming that Tabari had converted to Islam.

Doubt about the sincerity of Tabari’s conversion persisted. After giving a confessional speech to other political prisoners at Evin Prison, he was asked by the prison warden “to deny outright the rumor that he had cast himself into the role of a Galileo.” Tabari gave a “long, convoluted response” instead of a clear denial, and after his “confession,” he remained “not only incarcerated but also in total isolation – even from his own family.”

Tabari died on 29 April 1989 of kidney and heart failure while under house arrest in Tehran.
